= ZOEgirl discography =

- Studio albums: 4
- Compilation albums: 5
- Singles: 17
- Video albums: 2
- Music videos: 3
- Remix albums: 1

This is a listing of discography from the group ZOEgirl.

== Discography ==
=== Studio albums ===
List of albums, with selected chart positions, sales and certifications
Title	Details	Peak positions	
Title	Details	US	US Christ.
ZOEgirl	Release date: August 15, 2000; Label: Sparrow; Formats: CD, digital download	173	11
Life	Release date: November 20, 2001; Label: Sparrow; Formats: CD, digital download	111	9
Different Kind of Free	Release date: September 16, 2003; Label: Sparrow; Formats: CD, digital download	149	9
Room to Breathe	Release date: March 15, 2005; Label: Sparrow; Formats: CD, digital download	108	5

=== Remix albums ===
List of albums, with selected chart positions, sales and certifications
Title	Details	Peak positions	
Title	Details	US Christ.	US Dance.
Mix of Life	Release date: September 24, 2002; Label: Sparrow; Formats: CD, digital download	23	2

=== Compilation albums ===
List of albums, with selected chart positions, sales and certifications
Title	Details	Peak positions
Title	Details	US Christ
With All of My Heart – The Greatest Hits	Release date: December 27, 2005; Label: Sparrow; Formats: CD, digital download	42
The Early Years	Release date: August 15, 2006; Label: Sparrow; Formats: CD, digital download	—
Top 5 Hits	Release date: December 19, 2006; Label: Sparrow; Formats: CD, digital download	—
Greatest Hits	Release date: October 28, 2008; Label: Sparrow; Formats: CD, digital download	—

=== Karaoke albums ===
- Open Mic Karaoke, Volume 1, 2003 (Sparrow / EMD)
- Open Mic Karaoke, Volume 2, 2004 (Sparrow / EMD)

=== Singles ===
List of singles, with selected chart positions, showing year released and album name
Year	Title	Peak positions			Album
Year	Title	US Christ.	US Christ. AC	AU	Album
2000	"I Believe"	—	4	—	ZOEgirl
2000	"Anything Is Possible"	8	—	17	ZOEgirl
2000	"Living For You"	—	4	—	ZOEgirl
2001	"No You"	—	—	—	ZOEgirl
2001	"With All Of My Heart"	1	3	2	Life
2002	"Here and Now"	—	—	13	Life
2002	"Even If"	8	—	—	Life
2002	"Plain"	—	23	—	Life
2003	"Dismissed"	—	—	2	Life
2003	"You Get Me"	2	2	13	Different Kind of Free
2003	"Feel Alright"	—	—	—	Different Kind of Free
2004	"Beautiful Name"	10	9	12	Different Kind of Free
2005	"About You"	5	5	2	Room to Breathe
2005	"Scream"	—	40	5	Room to Breathe
2006	"Unchangeable"	21	20	8	With All of My Heart - The Greatest Hits
2026	"I Still Believe"	—	—	—	Non-album single

== Non-album songs and contributions ==
- "I'll Try" (Recorded for Life)
- "Faith Enough" (w/ Carman)... Heart of a Champion (2001)
- "Angels We Have Heard On High"... WOW Christmas: Red (2002)
- "Testify to Love (New Birth Mix)" (w/ Avalon)... O2: Avalon Remixed (2002)
- "Higher" (Duet w/ The Katinas)... It Takes Two (2003)
- "Jesus, Lover of My Soul"... WOW Worship: Red (2004)
- "What Child Is This?"... WOW Christmas: Green (2005)
- "Last Real Love" (Recorded for Room to Breathe) - Available on iTunes
- "Wanna Be Like You" (Recorded for Room to Breathe)

== In popular media ==
=== Video games ===
ZOEgirl has a total of nine songs which appear in rhythm games. Seven of them can be found in Digital Praise titles: six in the Dance Praise series, and one in Guitar Praise Expansion Pack 1:

Title	Album	Game/Expansion pack
"I Believe"	ZOEgirl	Original Dance Praise
"Suddenly"	ZOEgirl	Original Dance Praise
"Dismissed"	Life	Original Dance Praise
"Plain"	Life	Guitar Praise Expansion Pack 1
"Even If"	Life	Modern Worship
"Beautiful Name"	Different Kind of Free	Modern Worship
"You Get Me"	Different Kind of Free	Pop & Rock Hits
"About You"	Room to Breathe	Dance Praise 2: The ReMix

ZOEgirl songs were also used in Heavenly Harmony Gold and JAMband. The former is a karaoke game, while the latter adds support for band-like gameplay using guitar, bass and drum instrument controllers. "I Believe", "Beautiful Name", "You Get Me", "Safe" and "Scream" are some of the songs used in the games.
