= List of songs recorded by ZOEgirl =

The following is a list of songs by Christian pop rock band ZOEgirl.

Title	Year	Album	Length	Notes
"About You"	2005	Room to Breathe	3:24	First single of Room to Breathe.
"Anything Is Possible"	2000	ZOEgirl	3:17	Top 5 single released for the Adult Contemporary market.
"Beautiful Name"	2003	Different Kind of Free	4:47	Second single of Different Kind of Free
"Constantly"	2000	ZOEgirl	4:26	
"Contagious"	2003	Different Kind of Free	5:35	2 Corinthians 2:14
"Dead Serious"	2005	Room to Breathe	3:00	
"Different Kind of Free"	2003	Different Kind of Free	4:33	John 8:32, Romans 10:13
"Dismissed"	2001	Life	5:35	Single of the Life album. Music video available.
"Even If"	2001	Life	4:24	Top 10 single of the Life album. Released to radio in Fall 2002.
"Feel Alright"	2003	Different Kind of Free	3:10	Hebrews 12:1. Released to Radio Disney. Featured in Confessions of a Teenage Drama Queen.
"Forever 17"	2001	Life	4:22	
"Forevermore"	2005	Room to Breathe	3:31	
"Give Me One Reason"	2000	ZOEgirl	4:53	
"Good Girl"	2005	Room to Breathe	3:02	
"Here and Now"	2001	Life	4:27	Single released for the Life album.
"I Believe"	2000	ZOEgirl	4:06	Top 5 single released for the Contemporary Hit Radio (CHR) market. Music video available.
"I'll Try"	Unknown	N/A	Unknown	Recorded for the Life album, but did not make the final cut.
"It's Hard to Be a Girl"	2001	ZOEgirl: Limited Edition Single	4:06	Recorded for the Life album, but did not make the final cut. Available on the ZOEgirl: Limited Edition Single.
"Inside Out"	2003	Different Kind of Free	3:16	1 Peter 3:3-4
"Last Real Love"	2005	N/A	3:15	Recorded for Room to Breathe, but did not make the final cut. Released exclusively as a digital download on April 6, 2005.
"Let It Out"	2005	Room to Breathe	2:39	
"Life to Me"	2003	Different Kind of Free	5:50	Psalm 89:5-6
"Little Did I Know"	2000	ZOEgirl	3:26	
"Live Life"	2000	ZOEgirl	4:03	
"Living for You"	2000	ZOEgirl	3:45	Top 5 single released for the Adult Contemporary market.
"Love Me for Me"	2003	Different Kind of Free	3:32	Romans 15:7
"Nick of Time"	2001	Life	4:00	
"Not the One"	2005	Room to Breathe	3:24	
"No You"	2000	ZOEgirl	4:44	Top 5 single released for the radio.
"One Day"	2005	With All of My Heart – The Greatest Hits	4:03	
"Ordinary Day"	2001	Life	4:01	
"Plain"	2001	Life	4:44	Single released to Adult Contemporary market. Featured in Guitar Praise.
"Reason to Live"	2005	Room to Breathe	3:48	
"R U Sure About That?"	2001	Life	4:59	
"Safe"	2005	Room to Breathe	4:07	
"Save Myself"	2001	ZOEgirl: Limited Edition Single	4:06	Recorded for the Life album, but did not make the final cut. Available on the ZOEgirl: Limited Edition Single and Mix of Life.
"Scream"	2005	Room to Breathe	4:15	
"She"	2003	Different Kind of Free	4:49	John 8:7
"Skin Deep"	2005	Room to Breathe	4:41	
"Stop Right There"	2000	ZOEgirl	3:31	
"Suddenly"	2000	ZOEgirl	4:27	Featured in Dance Praise
"The Way You Love Me"	2005	Room to Breathe	4:25	
"The Truth"	2001	Life	7:17	
"Unbroken"	2003	Different Kind of Free	4:59	Psalm 34:18
"Unchangeable"	2005	With All of My Heart – The Greatest Hits	4:07	Single for the Adult Contemporary market.
"Upside Down"	2000	ZOEgirl	3:59	
"Wait"	2003	Different Kind of Free	4:34	Psalm 38:15 and 142:6
"Waiting"	2001	Life	4:34	
"Wanna Be Like You"	Unknown	N/A	Unknown	Originally set to be released on Room to Breathe, but did not make the final cut.
"With All of My Heart"	2001	Life	5:05	First single from the Life. No. 1 hit on CHR.
"You Get Me"	2003	Different Kind of Free	3:48	
