= With All of My Heart – The Greatest Hits =

Greatest hits album by ZOEgirl
- Released: December 27, 2005
- Studio: Bridge Street Studios (Franklin, Tennessee); Blue42 (Nashville, Tennessee)
- Length: 1:01:51
- Label: Sparrow
- Producer: Tedd T; Shaun Shankel; Joey P; Mark Heimmerman; Robert "Aurel M" Marvin

ZOEgirl chronology
Room to Breathe (2005)	With All of My Heart – The Greatest Hits (2005)

Singles from With All of My Heart – The Greatest Hits
- 1. "Unchangeable"

Greatest Hits
- Greatest Hits features cover art based on the Room to Breathe photo shoot

Professional ratings
Review scores
Source	Rating
Christianity Today	2.5/5 stars
Cross Rhythms	8/10
Jesus Freak Hideout	3/5 stars

With All of My Heart – The Greatest Hits is the first compilation album by ZOEgirl. It was released on December 27, 2005, and is named after their first No. 1 radio single, "With All of My Heart". The album was reissued as Greatest Hits on October 28, 2008. Notable changes include the album art, adapted from the Room to Breathe photo shoot, and the omission of three songs. Sparrow released two additional compilation albums: The Early Years (2006) and the two-disc The Ultimate Collection (2009) that gathered songs from the group's first five albums.

== Composition ==
Two new tracks were added to With All of My heart: "Unchangeable", released as a single, and "One Day". All other tracks were previously recorded on another album: two are from their self-tiled album, four are from Life, four are from Different Kind of Free, and three are from Room to Breathe. Most of these are the same as their original version, with a few exceptions:

- On the Life album, "With All of My Heart" includes a 48-second introduction to the album. On this compilation album, this was removed.
- "I Believe", from ZOEgirl's self-titled album, has been extended by 10 seconds at the very end, although there are no vocals in the extra seconds.
- "Beautiful Name", originally appearing on Different Kind of Free, is extended by five seconds. Similarly to "I Believe", no vocals can be heard during this extension.
- "Give Me One Reason" is 25 seconds longer than the original, because the chorus has been repeated once more towards the end.
- The version of "Plain" recorded on the Life album had a 27-second segue at the end. The track on this compilation album, however, cuts this segue, making the song fade out sooner much like the radio single version.
- "Dead Serious" on Room to Breathe and Greatest Hits ends at 3:01 and only features the song itself. On this compilation album, the track is placed before "Different Kind of Free", the title track of the album with the same name. "Contagious", a song from the FREE album, featured a 52-second segue from Mat Kearney that was played before the title track. Since "Contagious" is excluded from this compilation album, the segue has been placed at the end of "Dead Serious" instead, this was also included in the two-disc Ultimate Collection album.

== Track listing ==
No.	Title	Writer(s)	Originally from	Length
1.	"With All of My Heart"		Life	4:16
2.	"I Believe"		ZOEgirl	4:15
3.	"One Day"	Alisa Childers	Previously unreleased	4:03
4.	"You Get Me"		Different Kind of Free	3:51
5.	"About You"		Room to Breathe	3:23
6.	"Unchangeable"	A. Childers	Previously unreleased	4:07
7.	"Dismissed"		Life	3:20
8.	"Beautiful Name"		Different Kind of Free	4:51
9.	"Give Me One Reason" (†)		ZOEgirl	5:17
10.	"Plain"		Life	4:16
11.	"Scream"		Room to Breathe	4:14
12.	"Even If"		Life	4:23
13.	"Feel Alright" (†)		Different Kind of Free	3:08
14.	"Dead Serious"		Room to Breathe	3:53
15.	"Different Kind of Free" (†)		Different Kind of Free	4:34
Total length:				60:01

- † indicates a song removed in the 2008 reissue, Greatest Hits, and "Dead Serious" ends at 3:01 on that release.

== Personnel ==
ZOEgirl

- Alisa Childers
- Chrissy Conway-Katina
- Kristin Swinford

Musicians on Tracks 3 & 6

- Tedd T – programming
- Rusty Varenkamp – programming (3)
- Brent Milligan – guitars, bass (6)
- Lynn Nichols – guitars
- James Katina – bass (3)
- Mike Childers – drums

=== Production ===
- Nate Yetton – executive producer
- Tedd T – producer (1–4, 6–10, 12, 13), recording (3, 6), editing (3, 6)
- Joey P – co-producer (1), producer (9)
- Shaun Shankel – producer (5)
- Mark Heimmerman – producer (11, 14)
- Robert Marvin – producer (15)
- Rusty Varenkamp – recording (3, 6), editing (3, 6)
- Nathan Watkins – editing (3, 6)
- F. Reid Shippen – mixing (3, 6)
- Lee Bridges – mix assistant (3, 6)
- Richard Dodd – mastering
- Jess Chambers – A&R administration
- Holly Meyers – A&R administration
- Jan Cook – creative director
- Alexis Goodman – art direction, package design
- Proper Management – management

== Chart performance ==
- No. 42 - Billboard Christian
