= WOW Hits 2003 =

Compilation album by various artists
- Released: October 1, 2002
- Genre: Contemporary Christian music
- Length: 132:13
- Label: Chordant
- Producer: Various

Various artists chronology
WOW Hits 2002 (2001)	WOW Hits 2003 (2002)	WOW Hits 2004 (2003)

Professional ratings
Review scores
Source	Rating
AllMusic	3/5 stars
Robert Christgau	E+

WOW Hits 2003 is a compilation album featuring the best in Contemporary Christian music from 2002. It included thirty songs plus three bonus tracks on two CDs. The album peaked at No. 34 on the Billboard 200 chart. It was certified as platinum in sales in 2003 by the Recording Industry Association of America (RIAA).

== Track listing ==
Disc one
No.	Title	Writer(s)	Artist (Album)	Length
1.	"Magnificent Obsession"	Steven Curtis Chapman	Steven Curtis Chapman (Declaration)	5:01
2.	"Above All" (studio version)	Lenny LeBlanc, Paul Baloche	Michael W. Smith (Worship)	4:34
3.	"Say a Prayer"	CeCe Winans, Dennis Matkosky, Madeline Bell	CeCe Winans (CeCe Winans)	4:16
4.	"You Will Never Walk Alone"	Lowell Alexander	Point of Grace (Free to Fly)	4:25
5.	"Talk About It"	Nicole Coleman-Mullen, Brooke Dozier	Nicole C. Mullen (Talk About It)	3:06
6.	"Open Up the Sky"	Jeromy Deibler, Brian Smith	FFH (Have I Ever Told You)	4:02
7.	"I Have Been There"	Mark Schultz, Reggie Hamm	Mark Schultz (Song Cinema)	4:05
8.	"Who You Are"	Joshua Moore	Caedmon's Call (In the Company of Angels)	3:02
9.	"It is Well With My Soul" / "The River's Gonna Keep on Rolling"	public domain, Vince Gill	Amy Grant (Legacy... Hymns and Faith)	4:53
10.	"Holy"	Nichole Nordeman, Mark Hammond	Nichole Nordeman (Woven & Spun)	3:19
11.	"I'm All Yours"	Rachael Lampa, Natalie LaRue, Phillip LaRue, Paige Lewis	Rachael Lampa (Kaleidoscope)	4:30
12.	"I Don't Want to Go"	Jess Cates, Yanci	Avalon (Oxygen)	5:26
13.	"Holy Is Your Name" (featuring Bebo Norman & Caedmon's Call)	Marc Byrd, Steve Hindalong	City on a Hill (City on a Hill: Sing Alleluia)	3:30
14.	"Wonderful, Merciful Saviour"	Dawn Rodgers, Eric Wyse	Selah (Press On)	4:10
15.	"Defining Moment"	Leonard Ahistrom, Eddie Carswell, Buck Moore	NewSong (Sheltering Tree)	4:31
16.	"Enough" (bonus track)	Chris Tomlin, Louie Giglio	Chris Tomlin (Not to Us)	4:23

Disc two
No.	Title	Writer(s)	Artist (Album)	Length
1.	"Come Together"	Mac Powell, Mark Lee, David Carr, Tai Anderson, Brad Avery	Third Day (Come Together)	4:33
2.	"With All of My Heart"	Chrissy Conway, Joe Priolo	ZOEgirl (Life)	4:18
3.	"It Is You"	Peter Furler	Newsboys (Thrive)	4:22
4.	"All I Can Do"	Billy Chapin, Linda Elias, Chris Omartian	Jump5 (All the Time in the World)	3:13
5.	"Camouflage"	Nathan Walters, Jess Cates, Pete Kipley	Plus One (Obvious)	2:33
6.	"Irene"	Toby McKeehan, Randall Crawford, Pete Stewart	TobyMac (Momentum)	4:13
7.	"I Need You"	Dan Haseltine, Charlie Lowell, Matt Odmark	Jars of Clay (The Eleventh Hour)	3:39
8.	"Song of Love"	Rebecca St. James, Jeremy Ash, Matt Bronleewe	Rebecca St. James (Worship God)	4:09
9.	"Surrender"	Rob Graves, Jason McArthur	Joy Williams (By Surprise)	3:48
10.	"Breathing Life"	Cindy Morgan, Chris Rodriguez	Salvador (Into Motion)	3:35
11.	"Security"	Stacie Orrico, Tedd T, Britt Huston	Stacie Orrico (Stacie Orrico)	3:27
12.	"Say Won't You Say"	Jennifer Knapp	Jennifer Knapp (The Way I Am)	3:59
13.	"Ocean Floor"	Tyler Burkum, Ben Cissell, Bob Herdman, Will McGinniss, Mark Stuart	Audio Adrenaline (Lift)	4:08
14.	"You Are the Way"	Marc Byrd, Steve Hindalong	True Vibe (True Vibe)	3:32
15.	"Day Like Today"	Lisa Kimmey, Donnie Scantz, Jamie Portee	Out of Eden (This Is Your Life)	3:15
16.	"Turn" (bonus track)	Paul Colman, Phil Gaudion, Grant Norsworthy	Paul Colman Trio (New Map of the World)	3:41
17.	"All Around the World" (bonus track)	Joshua Washington, Jakob Washington, Rachael Washington, Chris Rodriguez	Souljahz (The Fault Is History)	4:35

== Certifications ==
Region	Certification	Certified units/sales
United States (RIAA)	Platinum	1,000,000^{^}
^{^} Shipments figures based on certification alone.

== See also ==
- WOW Hits
