= Power (Raze album) =

Studio album by Raze
- Released: July 13, 1999
- Recorded: 1998, 1999
- Studios: Earful Sound (Brentwood, TN), Perfect Music Studios (Manchester, England)
- Genres: Christian pop, Dance-pop, Europop, Hi-NRG, R&B
- Length: 1:06:26
- Label: ForeFront
- Producers: Michael Scott Quinlan, Tedd T, Zarc Porter

Raze chronology
That's the Way (EP) (1998)	Power (1999)	The Plan (2000)

Singles from Power
- 1. "Place In My Heart" Released: 1999; 2. "All Around the World" Released: 2000

Power is the second studio album from American Christian pop group Raze. It was released on July 13, 1999, through ForeFront Records as the group's first studio album in the United States. The album was produced by Michael Scott Quinlan, Tedd T. and Zarc Porter. It was recorded and produced in both the US and United Kingdom and sees the group expanding their signature europop sound with added dance and R&B textures. Upon release, critics responded enthusiastically to the album's dance-pop appeal and the band's vocal performance, several noting UK's Worldwide Message Tribe's influence through Zarc Porter's production and songwriting.

Power produced two singles, "Place In My Heart" and "All Around the World", both of which achieved success on Christian airplay. "Place In My Heart" peaked at number 3 both on the United States Billboard Christian Airplay chart, and in the United Kingdom's Cross Rhythms Christian Airplay Weekly Top 10 chart; "All Around the World" also placed in single-digits, reaching number 6 on the former and number 3 on the latter. The album also included three songs that originally appeared on the group's UK-exclusive 1997 self-titled debut album, Raze. The US and worldwide release of these tracks featured small reworks; "Listen" was given the title "Can You Hear Me Now" while "Brighter Day" and "Shouldn't It Be Me" were released with updated production.

== Critical reception ==
Professional ratings
Review scores
Source	Rating
AllMusic	3/5 stars
Jesus Freak Hideout	3/5 stars
Cross Rhythms	9/10 squares

Upon release, Power received a generally favorable reaction, with critics highlighting the album's sleek production and the group's performance capabilities. AllMusic's John Bush described Power as "an intriguing collection of surprisingly well-done pop music reminiscent of hi-NRG Euro-pop and the more mainstream side of dance music." Cross Rhythms praised the group's growth and genre-flexibility remarking "Raze now have a clear identity of their own, standing stylistically somewhere in-between TLC, Another Level and Basement Jaxx. This, their second full-length album, features a good variety of styles, grooves and tempos, all with strong arrangements, funky R&B/Dance programming and brilliant vocals and raps. This is everything you need from a Christian album" Jesus Freak Hideout's John DiBiase noted "traces of Out of Eden, World Wide Message Tribe, old dc Talk, and sometimes I'm unfortunately reminded of the Backstreet Boys." ultimately calling the album "not...among the best of the year, Power is one of the best of the summer."

== Accolades ==
Power received the award for Rap/Hip-hop/Dance Album of the Year at the 31st GMA Dove Awards on April 20, 2000. The following year, Power's second single, "All Around the World" was awarded the Rap/Hip-hop/Dance Recorded Song of the Year at the 32nd GMA Dove Awards on April 5, 2001.

== Track listing ==
No.	Title	Writer(s)	Length
1.	"All Around the World"	Ja'Marc Davis, Mark Pennells, Zarc Porter	04:24
2.	"Lead Me"	Ja'Marc, Julian Kindred, Tasia Tjornhom, Tedd T.	04:28
3.	"Place In My Heart"	Ja'Marc, Tedd. T	04:38
4.	"Say the Word"	Ja'Marc	03:36
5.	"Shoulder Shake"	Ja'Marc, Tedd T.	05:15
6.	"My Everything"	Ja'Marc	05:15
7.	"In the Name"	Ja'Marc, Pennells, Porter	03:55
8.	"Can You Hear Me Now"	Ja'Marc, Pennells, Porter	03:18
9.	"Change"	Ja'Marc	04:30
10.	"Shouldn't It Be Me"	Cameron Dante, Pennells, Porter	03:46
11.	"UBU"	Ja'Marc, Tedd T.	03:33
12.	"Always & Forever (BFF)"	Ja'Marc	15:37
Total length:			01:06:26

== Production and personnel ==
- C. Taylor Crothers – photography
- Cameron Dante – composer
- Carl Marsh – orchestra
- Damon Riley – digital editing
- Dan Brock – executive producer
- Eddie DeGarmo – executive producer
- Ja'Marc Davis – composer, guitar, programming
- Julian Kindred – composer, engineer
- Lynn Nichols – guitar
- Mark Pennells – composer
- Michael Scott Quinlan – producer
- Salvo – mixing
- Tasia Tjornhom – composer, vocals
- Tedd T. – composer, engineer, producer
- Zarc Porter – composer, engineer, producer, programming

== Charts ==
Chart performance for Power
Chart (2000)	Peak position
US Top Christian Albums (Billboard)	11
US Top Heatseekers (Billboard)	15

== Notes ==
- "Always & Forever (BFF)" originally appeared on Raze's 1998 That's the Way (EP). The Power album version includes a seven-minute-long hidden song featuring a dance backing-track and spoken-word segment performed by the group.
