= Hottie =

Hottie may refer to:

- A slang term for a physically attractive person
- A hot water bottle used to provide warmth
- Hottie, nickname of Holly Holm, top-ranked female welterweight boxer
- "Hottie", a 2000 song by Take 5 on their album Against All Odds
- "Hottie", a 2001 song by Ashley Ballard
- "Hottie", a 2017 song by Brockhampton on their album Saturation III
- "Hottie", a 2025 song from the Venus Vacation Prism: Dead or Alive Xtreme soundtrack
