= Even If =

Even If may refer to:

- "Even If" (Andy Abraham song), by Andy Abraham from the album Even If
- "Even If" (Ken Hirai song), by Ken Hirai from the album Gaining Through Losing
- "Even If", by Kutless from the album Believer
- "Even If" (MercyMe song), by MercyMe from Lifer
- "Even If" (ZOEgirl song), by ZOEgirl from Life
