= WOW Worship: Red =

Compilation album by Various artists
- Released: March 9, 2004
- Genres: CCM, CWM
- Length: 73:46 (Disc 1); 74:56 (Disc 2)
- Label: Word

WOW Worship compilation albums chronology
WOW Worship: Yellow (2003)	WOW Worship: Red (2004)	WOW Worship: Aqua (2006)

Professional ratings
Review scores
Source	Rating
Allmusic	link

WOW Worship: Red is the fifth installment in the WOW Worship series. It contains 34 praise and worship songs performed by top Christian artists. Twelve of the songs were newly recorded specifically for this release on Word Records. The album reached #62 on the Billboard 200 chart.

== Track listing ==
=== Disc 1 ===
1. Chris Tomlin - Famous One – 4:16
2. Third Day - Sweet Sweet Song (You Are So Good To Me) – 4:01
3. Bebo Norman - Amazing Love – 3:53 **
4. Mark Schultz - Give Us Clean Hands – 4:43 **
5. Darlene Zschech - The Potter – 4:55
6. Michael W. Smith - Above All – 4:33
7. Jaci Velasquez - Sanctuary – 3:40 **
8. Matt Redman and Tim Hughes - Once Again – 3:33
9. Rebecca St. James - The Power of Your Love – 4:33 **
10. ZOEgirl - Jesus, Lover of My Soul – 4:42 **
11. Joy Williams - How Deep The Father's Love For Us – 3:53 **
12. Michael Frye and Kathryn Scott - Be the Centre – 5:35
13. Steven Curtis Chapman with Chris Tomlin - We Fall Down – 4:24 **
14. Amy Grant - What A Friend We Have In Jesus/Old Rugged Cross/How Great Thou Art – 3:30
15. Twila Paris - We Will Glorify – 3:13
16. Casting Crowns - Beautiful Savior (Bonus Track) – 5:19 **
17. Planetshakers - All I Want Is You (Bonus Track) – 4:54

=== Disc 2 ===
1. Jeremy Camp - Enough – 3:53
2. Delirious? - Did You Feel the Mountains Tremble – 6:29
3. Jeff Deyo (of SONICFLOOd) - Lord I Lift Your Name on High – 4:27
4. Brenton Brown - Hallelujah (Your Love Is Amazing) – 4:09
5. Salvador - As The Deer – 3:57
6. Nicole C. Mullen - Hail Jesus! You're My Kin (Victory Chant) – 5:18
7. Plus One - Here I Am To Worship – 4:39
8. Paul Colman Trio - I Love You Lord – 3:31
9. Phillips, Craig and Dean - Let My Words Be Few – 4:18
10. Big Daddy Weave - Word of God Speak – 4:17 **
11. Randy Travis - Open the Eyes of My Heart – 3:55
12. FFH - Spirit of The Living God – 4:46 **
13. Keith Green - There Is A Redeemer – 3:10
14. Caedmon's Call - I Exalt Thee – 3:40 **
15. Jars of Clay - I'll Fly Away – 4:43 **
16. Tim Hughes - May The Words of My Mouth (Bonus Track) – 4:12
17. Jeremy Riddle - More Than A Friend (Bonus Track) – 5:31

=== Notes ===
** These twelve songs were newly recorded specifically for this release.

- This version of "Beautiful Savior" by Casting Crowns is the studio version and only available on this release. The live version is available on the audio disc Live from Atlanta.
- This version of "I'll Fly Away" by Jars of Clay is a different version than on Redemption Songs.
