= More Than a Dream =

More Than a Dream may refer to:

- "More Than a Dream", a book by the Entrepreneur and ImpactMaker David Togni with the help of Elias Brasser morethanadream.ch
- "More Than a Dream", a song by the Christian pop group Raze
- More than a Dream: How One School's Vision Is Changing the World, a 2008 book about Cristo Rey Jesuit High School
- "More Than a Dream", a song by the Pet Shop Boys on their album Yes
- More Than a Dream, an album by Harrison Craig and its title track
- "More Than a Dream", a song by Bill Wurtz
