= You Get Me =

You Get Me may refer to:

- "You Get Me" (song)
- You Get Me (film)
