= WOW Hits 2004 =

Compilation album by various artists
- Released: October 7, 2003
- Genre: Contemporary Christian music
- Length: 132:28
- Label: EMI Christian Music Group
- Producer: Various

Various artists chronology
WOW Hits 2003 (2002)	WOW Hits 2004 (2003)	WOW Hits 2005 (2004)

Professional ratings
Review scores
Source	Rating
AllMusic	4/5 stars
Christian Music Today	4/5 stars
Jesus Freak Hideout	4/5 stars

WOW Hits 2004 is a two-disc compilation album of songs that have been dubbed to showcase the best in contemporary Christian music. It was released on October 7, 2003. The album included thirty songs plus three bonus cuts on two CDs. It peaked at No. 51 on the Billboard 200. The album was certified as platinum in the US in 2004 by the Recording Industry Association of America (RIAA).

== Track listing ==
=== Disc one (Green Disc) ===
1. "He Reigns" – Newsboys
2. "Spoken For" – MercyMe
3. "Simple Things" – Amy Grant
4. "All About Love" – Steven Curtis Chapman
5. "Great Light of the World" – Bebo Norman
6. "Lord Have Mercy" (Live) – Michael W. Smith featuring Sarah MacIntosh
7. "Day By Day" – Point of Grace
8. "You Found Me" – FFH
9. "Everything to Me" – Avalon
10. "Legacy" – Nichole Nordeman
11. "You're My God" – Jaci Velasquez
12. "Sing Alleluia" – Jennifer Knapp & Mac Powell (of Third Day)
13. "Only Hope" – Caedmon's Call
14. "You Are a Child of Mine" – Mark Schultz
15. "The Other Side of the Radio" – Chris Rice
16. "My Heart Goes Out" – Warren Barfield **
17. "Masquerade" – Across the Sky **

=== Disc two (Gold Disc) ===
1. "Nothing Compares" (live) – Third Day
2. "You Get Me" – ZOEgirl
3. "Getting Into You" – Relient K
4. "Stuck" – Stacie Orrico
5. "Phenomenon" – tobyMac
6. "Breathe Your Name" – Sixpence None the Richer
7. "The Valley Song (Sing of Your Mercy)" – Jars of Clay
8. "I Thank You" – Rebecca St. James
9. "Love, Peace & Happiness" – Out of Eden
10. "The Way I Feel" – 12 Stones
11. "I Still Believe" – Jeremy Camp
12. "Run" – Kutless
13. "Why Do I Do" – Jump5
14. "Pierced" – Audio Adrenaline
15. "By Surprise" – Joy Williams
16. "All My People" – Lil iROCC Williams **

** Denotes Bonus Track

== Charts ==
=== Weekly charts ===
Chart (2003)	Peak position
US Billboard 200	51

=== Year-end charts ===
Chart (2004)	Position
US Billboard 200	176

== Certifications ==
Region	Certification	Certified units/sales
United States (RIAA)	Platinum	1,000,000^{^}
^{^} Shipments figures based on certification alone.

== See also ==
- WOW Hits
