= The Plan (Raze album) =

Studio album by Raze
- Released: November 7, 2000
- Recorded: 2000
- Studios: Antenna Studio (Franklin, TN), Groovewerks (Minnepolis, MN), Love Shack, ORU Audio, Sound Kitchen
- Genres: Christian pop, dance-pop, hip-hop, R&B, techno
- Length: 56:55
- Label: ForeFront
- Producers: Michael-Anthony Taylor, Tedd Tjornhorm, Peter Kipley

Raze chronology
Power (1999)	The Plan (2000)

Singles from The Plan
- 1. "The Plan" Released: 2000; 2. "More Than a Dream" Released: 2000

The Plan is the third and final studio album from American Christian pop group Raze. It was released on November 7, 2000, via ForeFront Records. It was produced by Michael-Anthony Taylor, Tedd T. and Peter Kipley and is Raze's first record produced fully in the United States; it marks a shift away from the europop influence featured on the group's previous releases, focusing instead on a slower sound with stronger hip-hop and R&B elements.

The Plan was supported with the release of two preceding singles, "The Plan" and the number 1 Christian contemporary radio hit "More Than a Dream".

== Critical reception ==
Professional ratings
Review scores
Source	Rating
AllMusic	2.5/5 stars
Jesus Freak Hideout	2.5/5 stars
Cross Rhythms	9/10 squares

Upon release The Plan received a somewhat mediocre critical response with the album being considered a less high-energy output in contrast to Power. Jesus Freak Hideout's John DiBiase noted the album's stylistic shift "The Plan doesn't seem to carry quite the 'power' that their debut album possessed. With a little more emphasis on beats and a little heavier hip-hop influence", concluding that the album is "a decent follow-up to Power, but nothing really extraordinary." AllMusic's Steve Losey also gave The Plan a mixed rating but commended the group's performance, "This unit shifts gears flawlessly, interchanging rhythms and styles on par with bands like Backstreet Boys, En Vogue, and Destiny's Child." Cross Rhythms offered The Plan the most praise, naming Raze, "America's premier pop dance team" and describing the album's production as, "a splendiferous selection of strong, radio friendly hooks, techno-tinged beats and lots of edgy R&B-styled harmonies".

== Accolades ==
The Plan received the award for Rap/Hip-hop/Dance Album of the Year at the 32nd GMA Dove Awards on April 5, 2001. The album’s second single, "More Than a Dream" received a nomination for Rap/Hip-hop/Dance Recorded Song of the Year, which went to the group’s song "All Around the World", the second single from their 1999 album, Power.

== Track listing ==
No.	Title	Writer(s)	Length
1.	"Intro"		0:09
2.	"Get with It" (Interlude)		0:25
3.	"The Plan"	Michael-Anthony Taylor	3:34
4.	"Amazing"	Taylor, Scott Faircloff, Dan Needham	3:34
5.	"Celebration"	Robert "Kool" Bell, Ronald Bell, George "Funky" Brown, Eumir Deodato, Robert "Spike" Mickens, Claydes Smith, James "J.T" Taylor, Dennis "D.T." Thomas, Earl Toon	4:09
6.	"L & G (Interlude)"		0:10
7.	"Follow Your Dreams"	Tommy Simms	3:16
8.	"If You Go"	Taylor	4:14
9.	"Laying Down My Will"	Taylor	4:37
10.	"10-4" (Interlude)		0:12
11.	"Oh How I Need You"	Christopher Heille	4:18
12.	"Forgive Me"	Taylor	3:53
13.	"I Wish"	Taylor	3:45
14.	"More Than a Dream"	Tedd Tjornhom	4:44
15.	"Did You Feel the Mountains Tremble?"	Martin Smith	13:31
Total length:			56:55

== Production and personnel ==
- Alan Umstead – strings
- Alvin Speights – mixing
- Bernie Grundman – mastering
- Bob Horn – assistant
- Bob Mason – cello
- Brian Gardner – mastering
- Carl Gorodetzky – strings
- Chad Brown – assistant
- Christopher Heille – arrangement preparation, engineer, guitar, programming
- Damon Riley – arrangement preparation, assistant, engineer, programming
- David Bach – executive producer
- Dennis "D.T." Thomas – composer
- Grant Green – assistant
- JaMarc Davis – guitar
- Jamie Davis – drums
- Jamie Rowe – background vocals
- Jill Greenberg – photography
- John Catchings – violin
- Julian Kindred – mixing
- Marcelo Pennell – engineer
- Micah Wilshire – guitar
- Michael-Anthony Taylor – producer
- Mooki – drum programming, keyboards, vocals
- Pam Sisten – strings
- Pete Kipley – producer
- Randy LeRoy – digital editing
- Richard Gaspart – assistant
- Scott McDaniel – creative director
- Shawn Andrews – digital editing
- Steve Hartly – executive producer
- Susannah Parrish – art direction
- Ted Tjornhom – composer, engineer, producer, programming
- Tiffany Palmer – background vocals
- Tim Akers – string arrangements
- Tom Perkins – assistant
- William "Willy Gunz" Morris – book direction

== Charts ==
Chart performance for The Plan
Chart (2000)	Peak position
US Top Christian Albums (Billboard)	31
US Top Heatseekers (Billboard)	25

== Notes ==
- “Did You Feel the Mountains Tremble?” is an electronic cover of Christian rock and worship band Delirious?’s song of the same name that originally appeared on the band’s 1995 EP, Cutting Edge 3 (Red Tape). Raze’s version includes an extended eight-minute-long hidden-song featuring a slowed dance beat and spoken-word passages performed by the group.
- The song "This Is" can be found on the special advance release edition of The Plan but was not included in the final tracklist.
