= Malaysian Tourist Guides Council =

The Malaysian Tourist Guides Council (MTGC) is a professional guild of Malaysian tour guides.

MTGSC is responsible for the education, licensing, coordination and welfare of tourist guides in Malaysia. It was officially registered on 28 June 1976.

== History ==
Tourist guiding in Malaysia started in the early 1960s. The first official tourist guides certification training course was organised in Kuala Lumpur in 1964, under the initiative of S.S. Virik, then Chairman of the Kuala Lumpur Tourist Guides’ Association (KLTGA). At that time, the lecturers and examiners involved were drawn from the various heads of governmental departments related to the tourism industry. A total of 64 participants attended the course and 40 participants being successfully awarded the certificate in tourist guiding.

In 1967, the Kuala Lumpur Tourist Guides Association (KLTGA) was formed. With Malaysia hosting the PATA Conference in 1972, and with more tourists visiting Malaysia, the Penang Tourist Guides Association (PTGA) and the Johor Tourist Guides Association (JTGA) were also formed.

MTGC was officially registered on the 28 June 1976 under the founder, Kon Fah Pen. He served until 1988 and was followed by Raymond Chan (PTGA) until 2000. The current president is Jimmy Leong Wie Kong (JTGA) .

== Objectives ==
MTGC holds regular quarterly meetings throughout Malaysia to discuss tourism related activities of state and national events and policies that affect both the tourism industry, and tourist guiding areas.

MTGC formulated the NOSS (National Occupational Skill Standards) for tourist guides, coordinating and organising of tourist guides upgrading programmes known as Continuing Tourism Related education (CTRE) for licensed tourist guides, supporting and participation in governmental and non-governmental tourism events and the constant and regular liaison role played between the tourist guiding profession and the government. In other sectors, MTGC played a major role in cooperating with other tourism related organisations, such as the National Tourism Council of Malaysia (NTCM).

== Restructuring ==
A call for MTGC to restructure was made known on the 23 July 2002 during the 1st. National Tourist Guides Conference. This was in response to an official nationwide survey conducted by MTGC in 2000. The survey results were released in 2001. MTGC proposed a Constitution in tandem with its restructuring plan to be implemented within the composition of the organization, and its Affiliates.

The new Constitution was approved by the Registrar of Societies on the 2 April 2008. It addressed the following concerns

- Promoting a Shared Vision and Value System
- Centralization and Standardization of All Tourist Guiding Policies
- Implementation of the MTGC's Code of Ethics;
- Addressing Individual Tourist Guide's Welfare
- Maximizing the Consistency Level within MTGC and its Affiliates
- Implementation of Successful Communication Effectiveness
- Proper Fund Management
- Initiating Systematic Project Implementation
- Self Administration of MTGC

== Affiliations ==
MTGC has a total of 12 affiliates representing about 5,000 tourist guides throughout Malaysia:

- Johor Tourist Guides Association (JTGA)
- Kedah Tourist Guides Association (KTGA)
- Kuala Lumpur Tourist Guides Association (KLTGA)
- Penang Tourist Guides Association (PTGA)
- Malacca Historical City Tourist Guides Association (MHCTGA)
- Pahang Tourist Guides Association (PHTGA)
- Mutiara Tourist Guides Association (PPPM)- Penang affiliated member
- Perak Tourist Guides Association (PKTGA)
- Sabah Tourist Guides Association (STGA)
- Sarawak Tourist Guides Association (SKTGA)
- Selangor Tour Guides Association (SGTGA)
- Terengganu Tourist Guides Association (TTGA)

History of MTGC

== Sources ==
- Mathew, David Dinesh (July 26, 2000). "Tourist Guides Gather For Talks". New Straits Times. Archived from the original on May 6, 2016 – via HighBeam Research.
- Malaysian Trade & Industry. Malaysian Enterprises. Volume 6. Pages 122 and 199. Google Books
