= Alisa Childers (album) =

Studio album by Alisa Childers
- Released: December 1, 2007 (US)
- Recorded: 2007
- Genre: CCM
- Label: Vintage Street Music
- Producers: Mike Childers and Alisa Childers

Alisa Childers is the self-titled debut album by former ZOEgirl member Alisa Childers. The album was released on December 1, 2007, and is also available online for download. It is the only solo album released by Alisa.

== Track listing ==
All songs written by Alisa Childers except where noted.

1. "The Truth Is..." - 4:09
2. "Take It From Me" - 4:20
3. "Skeletons" - 4:19
4. "I Say" - 3:48
5. "Bar On 59th" - 4:24
6. "Pretty Prison" - 3:24
7. "Bridges" - 3:32
8. "Glory" - 3:50
9. "Wake Me Up" - 2:50
10. "Baptize Me" - 6:12
11. "The Times They Are A-Changin'" (Bob Dylan) - 3:31

== Personnel ==
- Alisa Childers – vocals, acoustic piano (1, 3–11), backing vocals (2–10), Rhodes piano (2, 9, 10), acoustic guitar (2, 4, 6, 7, 9, 10), keyboards (5, 6, 11)
- Greg Hagan – electric guitar (1, 4, 5), guitars (6)
- Shane Hill – acoustic guitar (1)
- David Cleveland – electric guitar (2, 3, 4, 7), guitars (9)
- Jackie Street – bass (1, 7)
- Mark Childers – bass (2–6, 9, 11)
- Mike Childers – drums (1–7, 9, 10, 11)
- Matt Butler – cello (3, 8, 10)
- Chuck Girard – backing vocals (10)
