= Code of Ethics (band) =

American contemporary Christian music band

- Band members Rick, Barry and Skippy (L to R).

Background information
- Genres: Christian pop; electronic; new wave; pop; rock
- Years active: 1991–2001, 2007–2014
- Labels: R.E.X., ForeFront, Word
- Past members: Jeff Anderson; Barry Blaze; Rick Brainer; Scott "Skippy" Chapman; Steve Dale; Charles Garrett; Scott Kifer; Jerry Mowery; Eric Switzer
- Website: thisiscodeofethics.com

Code of Ethics was a contemporary Christian music band formed in Jacksonville, Florida. Their musical blended synth-pop, electronic, new wave, and rock. Founded by Barry Blaze and signed to ForeFront/EMI, the group included longtime members Rick Brainer and Skippy, and collaborated with writers like Gerald Josef, J Booth, and Ian Eskelin. They found success in the 1990s and early 2000s with three No. 1 singles on The CCM Update, two music award nominations, and one music award win.

== History ==
=== Creation and indie years: 1988–1992 ===
Code of Ethics was started in 1988 by Barry Blaze while living in Jacksonville, Florida. He was joined by Eric Switzer and Mark Tanner, with the trio releasing a self-titled, self-published cassette of Code of Ethics in 1990. The band's music was considered unique in that they were one of the few Christian music artists performing a Europop style, and were often compared to Depeche Mode and New Order. It is because of this release which made independent record label R.E.X. sign the band.

Visual Paradox became the first release by Code of Ethics in 1991 on R.E.X. Staying true to the style that got the band recognized in the first place, the freshman album was completely synth and beat driven. In an industry that wasn't accustomed to the Europop style, and due to the limited resources of R.E.X., the album had a tough time breaking into radio. In 1992, shortly before the band released their Visual Paradox remix EP simply called Mix, Switzer left the band. Blazs' ended up replacing him with friend Ian Eskelin temporarily as keyboardist. Mix contained remixes of "Visual Paradox", "I Need Your Love", and also contained a bonus track of "Follow On", which would be a teaser for what would appear on the follow-up second album. The song "Visual Paradox (Club Mix)" was eventually released in 1993 on the Motion Factory album which would also feature the song "Electricity" by Moby.

=== Forefront Records and success: 1993–1998 ===
During the writing and recording of the second album in Jacksonville, Code of Ethics asked to be released from R.E.X. Records due to a default payment from the label. As a result, former band manager Don Wrenn and attorney Sam Chappell negotiated a multiple-album deal with ForeFront Records. Additionally, Forefront purchased the masters to Visual Paradox and re-released under their own label in early 1993. The band then went back into the studio in Nashville and Memphis to finish the new self-titled album under the direction of John Jaszcz. During the recording, members Rick Brainer, and Scot Kifer joined the band, and Forefront brought future world renowned photographer Norman Jean Roy to shoot the band's album images. While the self-titled album was being mixed, Kifer met Scott "Skippy" Chapman. Several weeks later, he introduced him to Blazs, who then in-turn asked Chapman to join the band. The foursome would then go on to play their first concert together at Creation Festival in Mount Union, Pennsylvania a week before the new record Code of Ethics would be released.

The self-titled Code of Ethics record was officially released to stores on July 6, 1993. The first single "Something Real", which had been serviced to radio a month in advance of the record's release, became the band's first No. 1 single on Contemporary Hit Radio (CHR) in August for three weeks that year. The follow-up singles "True Love" reached No. 3, while "Follow On" would crest at No. 21.

The band gained more exposure by touring the record as the middle act for Newsboys on their Not Ashamed tour of 1993 to 94, with artist Tony Vincent as the show opener. The buzz generated from the success of the tour, along with their radio singles, led to the band being included in the first joint promotion with American Airlines and a record company called "The ExtrAA Mile Promotion".

Keeping inline with releasing a remix EP following a full-length album, Forefront released Extended Play Remixes in 1994, featuring the songs, "Without Reason", "Follow On", and "Satellite Babies". After the self-titled remixes, and in conjunction with licensing the song "Satellite Babies" to Warren Miller's ski videos, the band went to Chicago to film a video for "Satellite Babies". However, the video was never released by ForeFront because it was deemed "too dark" for Christian audiences. At the end of touring the self-titled record, Kifer ended up leaving the road, and the band, for personal reasons soon followed by Brainer. With Blazs and Chapman remaining in the band, they then turned to its next album.

On the heels of the self-titled record's success, Blazs and Chapman focused on the next record, which would prove to the band's most successful record yet. They again worked with Jacksonville songwriters Gerald Josef Gardiner and James "Jay" Booth. It is this foursome that are seen on the album Arms Around the World, which was shot by photographer Jeff Frazier on October 31, 1994. The cover was shot on the roof of the historic Marathon Motor Works building at Marathon Village. The album went on to win "Album Design of the Year" from the now defunct Academy of Christian Music.

With producer Tedd T at the helm, the group quickly got to work writing and recording. The record label wanted to capitalize off the previous record's success, so they brought in their own writers in an effort to further their careers. This collaboration at times created stylistic swings between some of the songs. The album was recorded over a period of nine months in the Nashville suburb Franklin where Tedd T and Dez Dickerson shared an office and studio. What would evolve from those sessions would go on to be named Arms Around the World and was subsequently released on April 25, 1995. Blazs would also professionally change his last name to Blaze at this time due to how everyone kept mispronouncing his last name.

While working in the studio, Code of Ethics was still contracted for several concerts and festivals. As a result, Gardiner and Booth toured with Blazs and Chapman to complete these shows. When recording was over, Gardiner and Booth went back to Jacksonville to resume working on their musical projects. The group then asked their friend, bassist Jeff Anderson to join. Brainer also came back to the band.

The album would garner more success for the band with two more No. 1 singles. "Sticks and Stones" would be the first single released hitting No. 1 on both the AC and CHR charts in July 1995. "Voice of Reason" would be the second No. 1 from Arms Around the World on the AC charts, and reached No. 2 on the CHR charts. Of the five singles released from the album, all broke the top 20, with three entering the top 5. Additionally, the band received its first Dove Award nomination due to the band's contribution to Forefront's collective collaboration, One Way: The Songs of Larry Norman, which was nominated in the "Special Event Album of the Year" category.

In touring for support of the record, the band hired an additional guitar player, Rob Policastro, to add more depth to the live show. In mid-1995 they toured the U.S. West Coast, a region of the country that had not really been explored by the band. In August 1995, they joined Christian rock legends Petra, who had just won their third Grammy earlier that year, for their No Doubt tour with Three Crosses as the opener. The tour would go through the end of November before the winter break. After the break, in 1996, management at the time thought the band should headline their own tour, which was known as "Know the Code", a play on words. The tour started in Winter Park, Colorado and continue West before to further establish new territory they broke the year before.

In the last half of 1996, the band came off the road for various reasons ranging from family concerns to health problems. Blazs needed replacement musicians and ended up recruiting Charles Garrett, Jerry Mowery, and Steve Dale. The trio finished whatever shows were left, and then helped Blazs record the next album. With Forefront viewing the modern musical landscape and the sales success of label mates Audio Adrenaline's 1996 release Bloom and DC Talk's 1995 Jesus Freak receiving RIAA certified Gold or Platinum (Jesus Freak being certified gold in just 30 days of release), the label pressured Blazs to record songs that were more rock and less electronic. To quote Blazs, "I was on a small label with great bands and friends during the early '90s, dc Talk, Audio Adrenaline, etc. Several bands put out their CDs before I made 'Soulbait' and they had moved into a more heavy guitar style. . .so the label came to me and said this is the sound we want and this is the style or direction we would like you to go (cut the keyboards way back please)".

Soulbait was released on February 11, 1997, to lackluster reviews. The style had veered too far away from its core sound, and the new set of writers failed to capture the sonic essence of the band. The two singles shopped to radio stations failed to chart above No. 23. Disappointed and discouraged, the new members left for other opportunities leaving Blazs again needing help. He reached out to Brainer and Chapman to see if they would join him again. They returned, and the three finished the remaining shows from the Soulbait tour. Additionally, Forefront Records did not renew an option for a fourth record after extremely disappointing sales.

=== Word Records: 1999–2001 ===
With the "classic" band pretty much back together, Code of Ethics steered itself back to the more electronic sound people knew. They secured a deal with Word Records and recorded Blaze with new producer; Sal Salvador. The music would be more dance-club-oriented than the band's typical Europop leanings. However, the lyrics would be more overtly Christian as contemporary worship music had become very popular at the end of the 1990s. Blaze was released on April 20, 1999. Although the album didn't have any singles to chart, the band was nominated for its second Dove Award when "Hallelujah 2000" was nominated for the "Rap/Hip-Hop/Dance Recorded Song" category for the year 2000.

=== Hiatus and near-fatal accident: 2001–2008 ===
Feeling the need to disconnect from what Code of Ethics had become, the members went their separate ways. Brainer started working with country acts in Detroit. Chapman went to university for recording industry business and to study film score and incidental music. Meanwhile, Blazs moved back to Jacksonville in 2001 and has been leading worship in a church there. After a near-fatal motorcycle accident in 2004, Blazs lost extensive amount of his hearing and vision. He went through a lengthy recovery period to restore partial hearing and vision.

=== Band reboot: 2009–2012 ===
Blazs recorded Lost In Egypt, which was released digitally on September 9, 2008, and on CD on February 10, 2009, via his label Razzbarry Records. While still leading worship, Blazs selectively toured with his wife Cynthia (DJ Chi) and occasionally other musicians such as Brainer, and Blaze's sister Julie Rodenhizer.

== Singles ==
List of singles, with chart positions
Title	Year	Peak chart positions		Album
Title	Year	US Christ AC	US Christ CHR	Album
"Something Real"	1993	2	1	Code of Ethics
"True Love"	1993	—	3	Code of Ethics
"Follow On"	1993	—	21	Code of Ethics
"Sticks and Stones"	1995	1	1	Arms Around the World
"Well Done"	1995	3	2	Arms Around the World
"Voice of Reason"	1995	1	2	Arms Around the World
"Take Control"	1996	—	15	Arms Around the World
"Pleasant Valley Sunday"	1996	18	5	Arms Around the World
"Soulbait"	1997	—	23	Soulbait
"Good Things"	1997	—	25	Soulbait
"Hallelujah 2000"	1999	—	—	Blaze
"Exalted"	1999	—	—	Blaze
"—" denotes releases that did not chart

== Awards and nominations ==
Year	Nominee / work	Award	Result
1996	"Nothing Really Matters"/One Way: The Songs of Larry Norman	Dove Award for Special Event Album of the Year	Nominated
2000	"Hallelujah 2000"	Dove Award for Rap/Hip Hop/Dance Recorded Song of the Year	Nominated

== General references ==
- Powell, Mark Allan (March 2003). The Encyclopedia of Contemporary Christian Music. Hendrickson Publishers. p. 186. ISBN 1-56563-679-1. "Christian radio hits:"
- Brothers, Jeffery Lee (2003). Hot Hits: Adult Contemporary Charts 1978-2001. CCM Magazine p. 287. ISBN 1-4107-3294-0.
