= The Promise (Plus One album) =

Studio album by Plus One
- Released: May 23, 2000
- Recorded: 1999–2000
- Genre: Teen pop; CCM
- Length: 44:25
- Label: Atlantic
- Producer: David Foster; Eric Foster White; Rodney "Darkchild" Jerkins; Harvey Mason Jr.

Plus One chronology
The Promise (2000)	Obvious (2002)

Alternative cover

Singles from The Promise
- 1. "Written on My Heart" Released: 2000; 2. "God Is in This Place" Released: 2000; 3. "Last Flight Out" Released: 2000; 4. "Here in My Heart" Released: 2000; 5. "Run to You" Released: 2000; 6. "Soul Tattoo" Released: 2001

The Promise is the debut album from Christian boy band Plus One. The album features the singles "Written on My Heart", "God Is in This Place", "Last Flight Out" and "Here in My Heart". The album was certified Gold in the United States during 2001.

== Track listing ==
No.	Title	Writer(s)	Length
1.	"Written on My Heart"	Lewis, McKnight, White	3:48
2.	"God Is in This Place"	Lewis, Sillas	3:42
3.	"The Promise"	Lewis, Sillas	3:45
4.	"My Life"	Brown, Parker	3:33
5.	"Soul Tattoo"	Lacy, Palmer	3:08
6.	"I Will Rescue You"	Kotecha	3:57
7.	"When Your Spirit Gets Weak"	Kember, Powers, Vertelney	4:07
8.	"Last Flight Out"	Alexandra, Raymel Menefee	3:56
9.	"Run to You"	Cates, Muckala	3:20
10.	"Be"	Cole, Combs, Lacey, Norfleet, Spalter, Walters	3:52
11.	"Here in My Heart"	Derlatka, Leven	3:00
12.	"My Friend"	Lewis, Sillas	4:17
Total length:			44:25

Asian Edition
No.	Title	Writer(s)	Length
1.	"Last Flight Out"	Alexandra	3:56
2.	"Here in My Heart"	Derlatka, Leven	3:00
3.	"I Will Rescue You"	Kotecha	3:57
4.	"Written on My Heart"	Lewis, McKnight, White	3:48
5.	"Soul Tattoo"	Lacy, Palmer	3:08
6.	"When Your Spirit Gets Weak"	Kember, Powers, Vertelney, Stacie Orrico, Rachael Lampa	4:07
7.	"Run to You"	Cates, Muckala	3:20
8.	"My Life"	Brown, Parker	3:33
9.	"Be"	Cole, Combs, Lacey, Norfleet, Spalter, Walters	3:52
10.	"My Friend"	Lewis, Sillas	4:17
11.	"God Is in This Place"	Lewis, Sillas	3:42
12.	"The Promise"	Lewis, Sillas	3:45
Total length:			44:59

== Home video ==
A VHS release titled Plus One: The Home Video was released in 2001 to promote the Promise album.

=== Backstage Exclusive book ===
A book, titled Backstage Exclusive, was released in 2001, featuring full-colour photos and facts from Plus One.

== Personnel ==
- Nate Cole – vocals
- Jason Perry - vocals
- Jeremy Mhire - vocals
- Nathan Walters – vocals
- Gabe Combs – vocals
- Michael Hanson - engineering
