= WOW Christmas: Green =

Compilation album by Various artists
- Released: October 4, 2005
- Genre: CCM, Christmas
- Length: 117:45
- Label: Word

WOW Christmas compilation albums chronology
WOW Christmas: Red (2002)	WOW Christmas: Green (2005)	WOW Christmas (2011)

Professional ratings
Review scores
Source	Rating
AllMusic	2.5/5 stars

WOW Christmas: Green is the second release in the WOW Christmas series. It is the follow-up to the platinum-selling WOW Christmas: Red album. The double-disc album features 15 new tracks that were (to date) exclusive to the release. The album peaked at No. 54 on the Billboard 200 chart in 2005, and at No. 2 on the Top Christian Albums chart. WOW Christmas: Green was certified gold in 2006 by the Recording Industry Association of America (RIAA).

== Track listing ==
=== Disc 1 ===
1. Amy Grant – "A Christmas to Remember" – 4:20
2. Natalie Grant – "Joy to the World" – 4:30
3. Rebecca St. James – "Hark the Herald Angels Sing" – 4:22
4. Steven Curtis Chapman – "O Little Town of Bethlehem" – 4:57
5. tobyMac – "O Come All Ye Faithful" – 3:08
6. ZOEgirl – "What Child Is This?" – 4:46
7. NewSong – "The Christmas Shoes" – 4:51
8. Jaci Velasquez – "I'll Be Home for Christmas" – 4:07
9. Chris Tomlin – "Angels We Have Heard on High" – 4:10
10. Jars of Clay – "Little Drummer Boy" – 4:20
11. Casting Crowns – "Away in a Manger" – 3:36
12. Third Day – "O Come, O Come Emmanuel" – 4:45
13. BarlowGirl – "O Holy Night" – 4:33
14. Avalon – "Don't Save It All for Christmas Day" – 4:45
15. CeCe Winans – "We Wish You a Merry Christmas" – 4:26

=== Disc 2 ===
1. Joy Williams – "Have Yourself a Merry Little Christmas" – 3:18
2. Bethany Dillon – "God Rest Ye Merry Gentlemen" – 3:33
3. Michael W. Smith – "Welcome to Our World" – 3:28
4. Matthew West – "Let It Snow, Let It Snow, Let It Snow" – 2:19
5. Clay Aiken – "Mary Did You Know?" – 3:18
6. Point of Grace – "Jingle Bell Rock" – 3:06
7. Building 429 – "We Three Kings" – 4:52
8. Kutless – "It Came Upon a Midnight Clear" – 3:36
9. Relient K – "Deck the Halls" – 1:20
10. Big Daddy Weave – "Go Tell It on the Mountain" – 3:52
11. Selah – "Silent Night" – 4:20
12. David Crowder Band – "Feliz Navidad" – 2:36
13. Mark Schultz – "The First Noel" – 4:54
14. FFH – "Do You Hear What I Hear?" – 4:09
15. Jump5 – "Sleigh Ride" – 3:12

== Certifications ==
Region	Certification	Certified units/sales
United States (RIAA)	Gold	500,000^{^}
^{^} Shipments figures based on certification alone.

== Notes ==
- The Relient K song "Deck the Halls", although listed as "exclusive" is in fact not. It was available on the Deck the Halls, Bruise Your Hand EP that came packaged with Two Lefts Don't Make a Right...but Three Do and is also available on Let It Snow, Baby... Let It Reindeer and also available separately on digital download services.
- Digital singles of the songs by Bethany, Big Daddy Weave, Building 429, Chris Tomlin, David Crowder Band, Rebecca St. James, and ZOEgirl were released after the release of this album, prior to Christmas 2005.

== Awards ==
In 2006, the album was nominated for a Dove Award for Special Event Album of the Year at the 37th GMA Dove Awards.
