= Across the Sky =

American Christian band

Across The Sky
- Origin: Nashville, TN
- Genres: CCM; Worship; Pop
- Years active: 2000–2005
- Labels: Word/Curb/Warner Bros. Records
- Past members: Ben Kolarcik, Justin Unger

Across the Sky was a Dove Award-nominated Christian band formed in Nashville, Tennessee, during 2001 by singer-songwriters Ben Kolarcik and Justin Unger, with a music style combining light rock, pop, and folk. Their self-titled debut was released in 2003, spawning a top ten song and three wide release singles. The group toured and recorded for two years under the Word Records Label before disbanding in 2005 and deciding to follow separate career paths.

== Early life ==
Ben Kolarcik's earliest performances were in his home church of Southeast Christian Church, in Louisville. These experiences led him to decide to be a full time independent artist. After high school, he married Melissa Strandell. Opportunities came about to perform consistently, nationally and internationally, including such places as Australia, Costa Rica, New Zealand, and Poland. A self-taught guitarist, he also learned to play piano and lap dulcimer. Kolarcik references his influences as being The Beatles, The Police and Jeff Buckley to Keith Green, Rick James, Jimi Hendrix and Rich Mullins.

Justin Unger had similar experiences. Raised on Christian music, Unger began playing piano at age 10 and trumpet in the school band, and began writing music at 17 for his grandfather, who was a pastor. He also started a Christian band called "Emmaus," performing as lead vocalist on the songs that his grandfather and he had written.

== Musical career ==
Across the Sky was formed when solo artists Kolarcik and Unger, who were under consideration by Word Records, met and began collaborations in Nashville. Both artists had a history of performance and music ministry in their hometowns and in regional tours. After deciding on becoming a duo act, the pair sat down to work on music together. After composing 50 or so titles, they settled on 12 for their first album. The pair was assisted along the way by such notable Contemporary Christian musicians and writers as Cindy Morgan, Scott Krippayne, Matthew Gerrard, Jeff Borders, Kyle Matthews and Tony Wood.

Their self-titled album was released in 2003. Much of the music on this project is artist-composed. During their run they toured extensively around the US and internationally. They toured with major established artists such as Michael W. Smith, Mark Schultz, Avalon, and MercyMe. Their debut album and tours garnered the duo a GMA Dove Award nomination for New Artist of the Year in 2004. Also in 2004 their song "Masquerade" was included on the Platinum Album WOW Hits 2004, an annual compilation CD of top artists of the previous year.

While still together they received radio play throughout North America, Latin America, Europe, and Australia. During this period, their single "Found By You" peaked at number 5 on the AC Christian Charts in the United States. Across the Sky disbanded in 2005.

The songs "Broken World" and "Give it all Away" were released as singles and received airplay in the US and radio stations in Australia, Canada, South America, and Europe. Their song "Everywhere She Goes" was featured in the first season of "One Tree Hill" on the WB network.

== Personal lives ==
After the duo disbanded in 2005, Unger moved to Prescott, AZ with his wife and children where he is a music minister at an alternative style megachurch called The Heights. Unger continues song-writing and composition. He released a solo CD titled "Disengage" on October 30, 2007, followed by 4 other albums in 2009, 2012, and 2016.

Ben Kolarcik resides in Phoenix, Arizona with his wife and children where he has pursued a career as a writer and composer. He also tours and still performs nationally with occasional bookings in other countries.

== Discography ==
- Across The Sky (2003)
1. Found By You
2. Give It All Away
3. Everywhere She Goes
4. When I Open My Eyes
5. Broken World
6. Shooting Star
7. Exciting Times
8. Masquerade
9. Persistence
10. First Love Song
11. Do You Dream Of Me?
12. Not So You Will Love Me
- CCM Top 100 Greatest Songs in Christian Music "When God Ran (Tribute Recording)" (2004)
- Found By You (Studio Series Performance Track) (2005)
- Broken World (Studio Series Performance Track) (2005)

== Compilation contributions ==
- WOW Hits 2004 "Masquerade" (2004)
