= Even If (ZOEgirl song) =

Single by ZOEgirl

from the album Life
- Genre: Christian pop
- Label: Sparrow
- Songwriter(s): Chrissy Conway-Katina, Alisa Childers, Lynn Nichols, Kristin Swinford-Schweain, Tedd T

ZOEgirl singles chronology
"Here and Now"	"Even If"	"Plain"

"Even If" is a single that was released by Christian pop trio ZOEgirl to radio stations on September 27, 2002. It reached number 8 on the R&R Christian CHR National Airplay chart.

== Track listing ==
1. Even If
2. Even If (Prefab Mix)
3. Anything Is Possible

== Versions ==
=== Smash-up ===
The song "Even If" was also released as a mash-up on the Smash-Ups CD, as the tenth and last track. The music from "Even If" is combined with the vocals from Carman's "Who's In The House", transforming the rap into a modern upbeat dance track. Christian Music Today criticized the new creation, and encourages listeners to "...end the listening experience with track 9..." or even "...intentionally scratch out the track with a pen-knife."

== Charts ==
On November 29, 2002, the song peaked at #8 on the R&R Christian CHR National Airplay chart.

== In popular media ==
The song "Even If" was featured on WWE Tough Enough.
