= WOW Christmas: Red =

Compilation album by Various artists
- Released: October 1, 2002
- Genres: CCM, Christmas
- Length: 126:21
- Label: Word

WOW Christmas compilation albums chronology
WOW Christmas: Red (2002)	WOW Christmas: Green (2005)

Professional ratings
Review scores
Source	Rating
AllMusic	3.5/5 stars

WOW Christmas: Red is the first release in the WOW Christmas series. The double CD contains 31 Christmas songs performed by top contemporary Christian music artists. It peaked at No. 45 on the Billboard 200 and in first place on Billboard's Top Contemporary Christian album chart in 2002. The album was certified platinum in 2006 by the Recording Industry Association of America (RIAA).

== Track listing ==
=== Disc 1 ===
1. Avalon – "Winter Wonderland" – 2:41
2. Michael W. Smith – "Emmanuel" – 5:26
3. Point of Grace – "O Holy Night" – 5:30
4. Steven Curtis Chapman – "Christmas Is All in the Heart" – 5:16
5. Yolanda Adams – "Have Yourself a Merry Little Christmas" – 3:35
6. Jaci Velasquez – "Let It Snow! Let It Snow! Let It Snow!" – 2:36
7. CeCe Winans – "Away in a Manger" – 4:24
8. Soulful Celebration – "Hallelujah!" – 5:53
9. 4Him – "A Strange Way to Save the World" – 4:32
10. Amy Grant – "Breath of Heaven (Mary's Song)" – 5:30
11. Nicole C. Mullen – "O Come, O Come, Emmanuel" – 4:17
12. Mark Schultz and Nichole Nordeman – "Silent Night" – 3:18
13. Kirk Franklin – "The Night That Christ Was Born" – 4:33
14. Kathy Mattea – "Mary, Did You Know?" – 3:14
15. Donnie McClurkin – "Hark! The Herald Angels Sing" – 5:23
16. Rachael Lampa – "Ave Maria" – 4:54

=== Disc 2 ===
1. Third Day – "Do You Hear What I Hear?" – 3:58
2. Jennifer Knapp – "Sing Mary Sing" – 4:05
3. ZOEgirl – "Angels We Have Heard on High" – 3:46
4. MercyMe – "What Child Is This?" – 3:49
5. tobyMac – "This Christmas (Joy to the World)" – 3:15
6. Sixpence None the Richer – "Christmas Time Is Here" – 3:03
7. Jars of Clay – "God Rest Ye Merry Gentlemen" – 3:03
8. Caedmon's Call – "It Came Upon a Midnight Clear" – 2:48
9. Plus One – "A Prayer For Every Year" – 4:21
10. Rebecca St. James – "Sweet Little Jesus Boy" – 3:35
11. FFH – "The First Noel" – 4:48
12. Out of Eden – "O Little Town of Bethlehem" – 3:34
13. Fred Hammond – "Go Tell It on the Mountain" – 3:52
14. Stacie Orrico – "O Come, All Ye Faithful" – 3:58
15. Audio Adrenaline – "Little Drummer Boy" – 3:07

== Certifications ==
Region	Certification	Certified units/sales
United States (RIAA)	Platinum	1,000,000^{^}
^{^} Shipments figures based on certification alone.
