= Mix of Life =

Remix album by ZOEgirl
- Released: September 24, 2002
- Label: Sparrow

ZOEgirl chronology
Life (2001)	Mix of Life (2002)	Different Kind of Free (2003)

Professional ratings
Review scores
Source	Rating
Christianity Today	3/5 stars
Cross Rhythms	9/10 squares
The Phantom Tollbooth	(favorable)

Mix of Life is a remix album, the fourth album released by ZOEgirl, featuring songs from Life, as well as their self-titled album.

== Track listing ==
No.	Title	Originally from	Length
1.	"Dismissed (Omega 8 Mix) (featuring Shonlock)"	Life	3:44
2.	"Even If (Prefab Mix)"	Life	7:02
3.	"I Believe (Trip Rock Mix)"	ZOEgirl	5:53
4.	"Waiting (Nova Mix)"	Life	7:00
5.	"With All of My Heart (Beatmart Mix) (featuring Soul Purpose)"	Life	4:38
6.	"Save Myself (You Like That? Mix) (featuring MC Flipper)"	Previously unreleased	3:54
7.	"Ordinary Day (Blue Mix)"	Life	6:07
8.	"Plain (Beautiful Chill Mix)"	Life	7:50
9.	"Nick of Time (H2O Mix)"	Life	3:07
10.	"No You (H2O Mix)"	ZOEgirl	3:11
11.	"Anything Is Possible (Madame Lapulse Mix)"	ZOEgirl	5:16
12.	"Living for You (The Ghost Mix) (featuring GRITS)"	ZOEgirl	4:04
13.	"Here and Now (Turbo Radio Mix)"	Life	3:57
Total length:			65:42

== Chart performance ==
- No. 2 - Billboard Electronic
- No. 15 - Billboard Heatseekers
- No. 23 - Billboard Contemporary Christian
