= ZOEgirl (album) =

Studio album by ZOEgirl
- Released: August 15, 2000
- Recorded: 2000
- Genres: Pop; CCM
- Label: Sparrow
- Producers: Joey P; Michael Quinlan; Tedd T

ZOEgirl chronology
ZOEgirl (2000)	Life (2001)

Singles from ZOEgirl
- 1. "I Believe" Released: July 10, 2000; 2. "Anything Is Possible" Released: October 13, 2000; 3. "Living For You" Released: December 11, 2000; 4. "No You" Released: April 8, 2001

Professional ratings
Review scores
Source	Rating
AllMusic	4/5 stars
American Culture Scope	1/5 stars
Cross Rhythms	8/10 squares
Jesus Freak Hideout	3.5/5 stars
The Phantom Tollbooth	3.5/5 stars

ZOEgirl is the debut studio album by the American Christian pop girl group ZOEgirl. It was released on August 15, 2000 through Sparrow Records. "I Believe", "Anything Is Possible", "No You" and "Living For You" were released as radio singles.

== Background ==
After the ZOEgirl group was formed, they immediately began to work on their self-titled album at a fast pace. They temporarily separated during the Christmas holidays of 1999 to pray about the album and the message they should record on it. After this, they realized that they wanted to talk about their relationships with God and the romantic relationships that people may face in life. Producers remarked that paper, drafting the debut album's content, was scattered all around the studio.

When the album's musical content was finished, ZOEgirl traveled to New York City to meet with a stylist for fashion suggestions regarding a photo shoot. After they agreed on what to wear, they traveled to Los Angeles, California for an entire photo shoot day. It is unknown whether the music video was also recorded in this city, but the similarities between the album art and the music video seem to suggest this to be true.

== Release ==
ZOEgirl was released to retail stores on August 15, 2000. It included a link to ZOEgirlOnline.com which served as the group's website. The music video for "I Believe" was released around that time and could be streamed online via this site. A higher quality version of the video was also released on the VHS cassette of WOW Hits 2001.

The album peaked at No. 173 on the Billboard 200, No. 11 on the Billboard Contemporary Christian Charts and No. 8 on the Billboard Heatseeker's Chart. As of October 2003, over 350,000 copies of the debut record were sold.

=== Reception ===
ZOEgirl got mixed reviews. Jesus Freak Hideout noted that those who "like to dance but really don't like the secular junk (Britney Spears) [...] will want to check ZOEgirl out." Meanwhile, Christian Music Today pointed out that the album "still didn't seem to measure up to mainstream quality songwriting and production." This was echoed by American Culture Scope, stating that the "sweet and sour" album was "tasteless" and that "groups such as SHeDAISY [&] Dixie Chicks [are] much better."

Nearly a decade after its release, ZOEgirl admits that their debut album was "bashed" by critics. The album remained on the Nielsen SoundScan Top 40 Christian Album chart for nearly a year after its release.

== Track listing ==
All the songs from ZOEgirl's debut album were written by at least one band member. Some songs were written with the help of non-members.

#	Title	Writers	Time
1.	"I Believe"	Alisa Childers	4:06
2.	"Anything Is Possible"	Kristin Schweain, Childers, Conway-Katina, Joe Priolo	3:17
3.	"Suddenly"	Schweain, Childers, Conway-Katina, Tedd T, Lynn Nichols	4:27
4.	"Give Me One Reason"	Schweain, Childers, Conway-Katina	4:53
5.	"Living For You"	Schweain, Childers, Conway-Katina, Priolo, Shauna Bolton	3:45
6.	"No You"	Conway-Katina, Priolo, Bolton, Errol Johnson	4:44
7.	"Little Did I Know"	Schweain, Childers, Conway-Katina, Tedd T, Steve Hartley, Nichols	3:26
8.	"Stop Right There"	Schweain, Childers, Conway-Katina, Priolo, Johnson	3:31
9.	"Upside Down"	Schweain, Childers, Conway-Katina, Michael Quinlan	3:59
10.	"Live Life"	Schweain, Childers, Conway-Katina, Quinlan	4:03
11.	"Constantly"	Schweain, Quinlan	4:26

== Related products ==
Several products related to this album were released.

=== Book ===
A book, titled Backstage Exclusive, was released in 2001, featuring full-colour photos and facts from ZOEgirl.

=== Other music ===
The following remixes can be found on Mix of Life:

- "I Believe" [Trip Rock Remix]
- "No You" [H2O Mix]
- "Anything Is Possible" [Madame Lapulse Mix]
- "Living For You" [The Ghost Mix]

Additionally, the following remixes can be found on Life's limited edition single.

- "I Believe" (Riverside Mix)
- "Anything Is Possible" (Riverside Mix)

Karaoke tracks were also released. Volume one of ZOEgirl's Open Mic Karaoke disc series features "I Believe" and "Anything Is Possible".

=== Video games ===
Original Dance Praise, released in 2005, featured two songs from ZOEgirl's debut album: "I Believe" and "Suddenly".
