= Room to Breathe (ZOEgirl album) =

Studio album by ZOEgirl
- Released: March 15, 2005
- Studios: Sweetbriar Studios, The Loft, Pentavarit, Fireside Studios, Sound Stage Studios and The Lealand House (Nashville, Tennessee); Bridge Street Studios, Dark Horse Studios, Sound Kitchen, Fun Attic Studios and The Bennett House (Franklin, Tennessee)
- Genres: Pop rock; CCM
- Length: 40:16
- Label: Sparrow
- Producers: Doubledutch (Josiah Bell & Robert Marvin); Tedd T; Mark Heimmerman; Shaun Shankel

ZOEgirl chronology
Different Kind of Free (2003)	Room to Breathe (2005)	With All of My Heart – The Greatest Hits (2005)

Singles from Room to Breathe
- 1. "About You" Released: February 7, 2005; 2. "Scream" Released: July 10, 2005; 3. "Dead Serious"

Alternative cover
- Candidate for the album cover voting contest.

Alternative cover
- Candidate for the album cover voting contest.

Professional ratings
Review scores
Source	Rating
About.com	5/5 stars
AllMusic	4/5 stars
Christianity Today	3/5 stars
Christian Music Central	81%
Cross Rhythms	8/10 squares
Jesus Freak Hideout	4/5 stars

Room to Breathe is the fourth and final studio album by the American Christian pop girl group ZOEgirl.

== Track listing ==
No.	Title	Writer(s)	Length
1.	"Reason to Live"	Lynn Nichols, Alisa Childers, Kristin Schweain, Josiah Bell, Robert Marvin	3:48
2.	"Dead Serious"	Mark Heimermann, Chrissy Katina, Childers, Schweain	3:00
3.	"About You"	Pete Kipley, Shaun Shankel, F. Reid Shippen, Katina, Childers, Schweain	3:24
4.	"Scream"	Childers	4:15
5.	"Forevermore"	Nichols, Bell, Katina, Childers, Marvin, Schweain	3:31
6.	"The Way You Love Me"	Katina, Nichols, Bell, Marvin	4:25
7.	"Let It Out"	Katina, Childers, Nichols, Schweain, Brandon Harris	2:39
8.	"Good Girl"	Katina, Childers, Schweain	3:02
9.	"Not the One"	Katina, Nichols, Marvin, Childers, Bell	3:24
10.	"Skin Deep"	Schweain	4:41
11.	"Safe"	Katina, Childers, Schweain	4:07
Total length:			40:16

== Personnel ==
ZOEgirl

- Alisa Childers – vocals, acoustic guitar (8)
- Chrissy Conway-Katina – vocals
- Kristin Schweain – vocals, acoustic piano (10)

Musicians

- Josiah Bell – programming (1, 5, 6, 9, 11)
- Robert Marvin – programming (1, 5, 6, 9, 11), acoustic piano (11)
- Mark Heimmerman – programming (2, 4), keyboards (2, 4), acoustic piano (4)
- Shaun Shankel – keyboards (3), arrangements (3)
- Tedd T – programming (7, 8, 10)
- Brandon Harris – programming (7), additional guitars (7)
- Damon Riley – programming (8)
- Lynn Nichols – guitars (1, 5, 6, 9, 11), electric guitars (7, 8, 10)
- George Cocchini – guitars (2, 4)
- Pete Kipley – guitars (3)
- Brent Milligan – additional guitars (7, 8)
- Chris Rodriguez – acoustic guitar (10)
- James Katina – bass (1, 5–11)
- Jackie Street – bass (2, 4)
- Mike Childers – drums (1, 5–11)
- Dan Needham – drums (2, 4)
- Chris McHugh – drums (3)
- David Davidson – viola (4), violin (4)
- Claire Indie – cello (6, 11)
- Christa Black – violin (11)
- Andy Selby – string arrangements (11)

=== Production ===
- Brent Milligan – executive producer
- Josiah Bell – producer (1, 5, 6, 9, 11), editing (1, 5, 6, 9, 11), recording (6)
- Robert Marvin – producer (1, 5, 6, 9, 11), editing (1, 5, 6, 9, 11), recording (1, 5, 6, 9, 11)
- Lynn Nichols – additional production (1, 5–11)
- Mark Heimmerman – producer (2, 4)
- Shaun Shankel – producer (3), recording (3), digital editing (3)
- Tedd T – producer (7, 8, 10), overdub recording (7, 8, 10), editing (7, 8, 10)
- Joe Baldridge – bass and drum recording (1, 5, 6, 9, 11), track recording (7, 8, 10), mixing (7, 10)
- Nathan Watkins – bass and drum editing (1, 5, 6, 9, 11), tracking assistant (7, 8, 10)
- Andy Selby – vocal editing (1, 5, 6, 9, 11), cello recording (6), recording (11)
- Shane D. Wilson – mixing (1, 5, 6, 9)
- Todd Robbins – recording (2, 4), mixing (2, 4)
- Pete Kipley – recording (3)
- F. Reid Shippen – recording (3), mixing (3, 11)
- Bill Whittington – digital editing (3)
- Skye McCaskey – overdub recording (7, 8, 10), recording (9, 11)
- Rusty Varenkamp – overdub recording (7, 8, 10), editing (7, 8, 10)
- Allen Salmon – editing (7, 8, 10)
- Tony Palacios – mixing (11)
- Dave Salley – assistant engineer (2, 4)
- Josh Vegors – assistant engineer (2, 4)
- Chris Yoakum – assistant engineer (2, 4)
- Lee Bridges – recording assistant (3), digital editing (3)
- Mike "X" O'Connor – recording assistant (3), digital editing (3)
- Kenzi Butler – mix assistant (11)
- Ted Jensen – mastering
- Leon Zervos – mastering
- Sterling Sound (New York, NY) – mastering location
- PJ Heimmerman – production manager (2, 4)
- Jan Cook – creative director
- Alexis Goodman – art direction, design
- Dana Tynan – photography
- David Cox – hair stylist
- David Kaufman – wardrobe styling
- Sarah Sullivan – make-up
- Proper Management – management

== Reception ==
Room to Breathe received generally favourable reviews. JesusfreakHideout gave it 4 stars and said "Room to Breathe is as relevant and bold as ever". CCM also gave it high ratings saying "Room to Breathe is a solid, wisely produced collection".

== Chart performance ==
Room to Breathe peaked at No. 108 on the Billboard 200. It peaked at No. 5 on Billboard's Top Christian Albums and reached the No. 1 spot on Billboard's Heetseekers chart.
