= Ashley Ballard =

American R&B singer

- Born: Ashley Monique Ballard; June 9, 1985 (age 41); Mission Viejo, California, U.S.
- Occupations: Singer-songwriter, record producer
- Years active: 1999–present
- Labels: Atlantic, Weja Media/XLP

Ashley Ballard (born June 9, 1985) is an American R&B singer who was signed to Atlantic Records in the 2000s (decade). Her debut single "Hottie" was released in the United States on January 30, 2001 to Rhythmic contemporary radio and was released on February 6, 2001 to Contemporary hit radio, and received airplay, charting on the US Billboard charts peaking at number twenty-five. Her debut album Get in the Booth followed on May 15, 2001, though it was never commercially released on physical CD format (except for a run of "Advance Release" CD's for promotional purposes). The single "Hottie" from the album sold over 100,000 copies worldwide.

In the 2000s, Ballard made television appearances including a concert part of the "Teensation" concert series, performing live with both James Brown and Josh Groban; toured the country with The Radio Disney Tour, and appeared on the cover of several publications, including Billboard magazine; and appeared and performed on The Jenny Jones Show.

Her music was featured on an Atlantic Records compilation called Rock N Sole which shipped over 60,000 units to Sam Goody stores.

She also appeared on the Pokémon: The First Movie soundtrack and the Center Stage soundtrack.

== Get in the Booth track listing ==
1. "Hypnotized"
2. "Hottie"
3. "All I Ever..."
4. "Forever"
5. "Hi Low"
6. "Girls Like Me"
7. "No Matter What"
8. "Second Thoughts" (featuring PlusONE)
9. "5 x 5"
10. "Love Is Real"
11. "Why?"
12. "It Was You" (featuring So Plush)
13. "No More Miss Nice"
14. "I'll Be Waiting"
