= Life (ZOEgirl album) =

Studio album by ZOEgirl
- Released: November 20, 2001
- Genres: Pop; CCM
- Label: Sparrow
- Producers: Tedd T; Joe P; Aurel M

ZOEgirl chronology
ZOEgirl (2000)	Life (2001)	Mix of Life (2002)

Singles from ZOEgirl
- 1. "With All of My Heart" Released: October 8, 2001; 2. "Dismissed" Released: February 18, 2002; 3. "Here and Now" Released: March 4, 2002; 4. "Even If" Released: September 27, 2002; 5. "Plain" Released: November 11, 2002

Professional ratings
Review scores
Source	Rating
Answers.com	2.5/5 stars
Allmusic	3/5 stars
CCM Magazine	3.5/5 stars
Cross Rhythms	8/10 squares
Crosswalk.com	A
Jesus Freak Hideout	4.5/5 stars
The Phantom Tollbooth	3.5/5 stars

Life, released in 2001, is the second album by the American Christian pop girl group ZOEgirl. "With All of My Heart", "Here and Now", "Even If", "Dismissed" and "Plain" were released as singles.

== Background ==
A pre-release disc known as "Highlights From Life" was released for promotional purposes. It featured "With All of My Heart", "Dismissed", "Waiting", "Nick of Time" and "Even If".

== Track listing ==
All the songs from Life were either written or co-written by at least one ZOEgirl member.

#	Title	Writers	Time
1.	"With All of My Heart"	Chrissy Conway, Joe Priolo	5:04
2.	"Even If"	Alisa Childers, Conway, Kristin Schweain, Lynn Nichols, Tedd T.	4:24
3.	"Dismissed"	Childers, Conway, Schweain, Nichols, Tasia Tjornhom, Tedd T.	3:20
4.	"Waiting"	Childers, Conway, Schweain, Jesse Katina, Robert Marvin	4:03
5.	"R U Sure About That?"	Childers, Conway, Schweain, Nichols, Tedd T.	4:59
6.	"Ordinary Day"	Childers, Conway, Schweain, Nichols, Tedd T.	4:01
7.	"Plain"	Schweain	4:44
8.	"Nick of Time"	Schweain, Nichols, Tedd T.	4:00
9.	"Forever 17"	Schweain	4:22
10.	"Here and Now"	Childers, Conway, Schweain, Priolo	4:27
11.	"The Truth"	Childers	7:17

== Song by song ==
"With All of My Heart" starts the album with a pumped up pop-worship song. It obtained the #1 position for 3 weeks on the CHR Charts, and featured in the top 5 on AC radio charts. It was covered by X.ado.

"Even If" is a euro-style dance track.

"Dismissed" is a dance pop/R&B song. The bold lyrics encourage young ladies to end ("dismiss") unhealthy relationships while also, ZOEgirl sings about not giving in to Satan.

"Waiting" is a slow song, and talks about the God waiting for individuals to come to Him.

"R U Sure About That?" consists of a mix of electronic pop and Spanish guitar; Beethoven's "Für Elise" is plucked out. The song talks about guys, girls, and the truth about life. At the end of the song, a Baroque-styled bridge includes a short "radio talk" and a transition to the next track.

"Ordinary Day" is yet another upbeat song.

"Plain", written solely by Kristin Swinford to address "her own intense struggles with self-esteem" is a slow, soft pop song. The lyrics are similar to Christina Aguilera's "Beautiful", as it reminds the listener that they are a precious treasure, no matter what others say. However, while ZOEgirl's song features references to God, Christina's does not. Later, on their final album (Room to Breathe), Kristin writes "Skin Deep" to once again address self-esteem struggles.

"Nick of Time" is an R&B song.

"Forever 17" is a tender song with piano and strings. The lyrics reflect on the fragility of life, recounting the story of a teenage girl killed by a drunk driver.

"Here and Now" is a pop rock track with electric guitars and drum loops. The lyrics encourage Christians to stand together and live for Jesus with all they have. This music genre becomes more common in ZOEgirl's later works, including Different Kind of FREE and Room to Breathe.

"The Truth", the final track, is written by Alisa Girard. It is a slowed-down song, reminiscent of "Constantly" from ZOEgirl's debut album. The final section of the song ends at 6:10. After 18 seconds of silence, the hidden track of "ABCs to Salvation" begins at the 6:28 mark, which can be heard.

== Personnel ==
ZOEgirl

- Chrissy Conway – vocals
- Alisa Girard – vocals, keyboards (11)
- Kristin Swinford – vocals, Fender Rhodes (7)

Additional musicians

- Tedd T – programming (1–3, 5–8, 10, 11), arrangements (1–3, 5–8, 10, 11)
- Joe P – additional programming (1, 10)
- Damon Riley – additional programming (2, 3, 5–8, 11)
- Kene "Ghost" Bell – additional programming (2, 3, 5–8, 11), additional vocal arrangements (9), additional guitars (11)
- Robert "Aurel M" Marvin – all other instruments (4, 9), acoustic piano (4, 9)
- Byron Hagan – acoustic piano (4, 9)
- Lynn Nichols – guitars (1–3, 5–8, 10, 11)
- Greg Hagan – guitars (4, 9)
- Aaron Featherstone – additional guitars (11)
- The Love Sponge Strings – strings
- Andy Selby – string arrangements (9)
- ZOEgirl – vocal arrangements (9)
- Honor Tjornhom – guest vocal (3)

Production

- Lynn Nichols – executive producer
- Tedd T – producer (1–3, 5–8, 10, 11), recording (1–3, 5–8, 10, 11), mixing (2, 5)
- Joe P – co-producer (1, 10)
- Aurel M – producer (4, 9), recording (4, 9)
- Jacquire King – additional production (11), mixing (11)
- Chrissy Conway – additional recording (1–3, 5–8, 10, 11)
- Salvo – mixing (1, 3, 4, 6–10)
- Kene Bell – editing (2, 3, 5–8, 11)
- Damon Riley – editing (2, 3, 5–8, 11)
- Richard Dodd – mastering
- Christiév Carothers – creative direction
- Jan Cook – art direction
- BENTO – design
- Mike Ruiz – photography
- Daniel Caudill – stylist
- Robert Ramos – hair stylist
- Sarah Sullivan – make-up
- Proper Management – management

== Reception ==
Life received generally favourable reviews. JesusfreakHideout said "From funky dance-pop to heart-wrenching songs, it can't really get much better than this". CCM Magazine called the album "a winner". Life peaked at No. 111 on the Billboard 200, No. 9 on the Billboard Contemporary Christian Charts and No. 2 on the Billboard Heatseeker's Chart. Christianity Today says "Life may well be the best Christian teen pop album released to date."

In Australia, Life was a great success for radio airplay. Three songs from Life appeared on The Rock Across Australia's Top 100 Songs of 2002 year-end chart. "With All of My Heart" received the No. 26 position, "Dismissed" received the No. 39 position, and "Here and Now" received the No. 88 position. The album also allowed ZOEgirl to secure the No. 18 position for The Rock's Top 50 Artists of 2002 chart.

== Related products ==
There are many products related to the Life album:

- The Real Life video was released on VHS and DVD. It featured the music video for "Dismissed", as well as video montages for the songs "I Believe" and "With All of My Heart". There are also interviews with ZOEgirl.
- The remix album Mix of Life was released in 2002, featuring remixes from all songs in Life (except "R U Sure About That", "Forever 17" and "The Truth"). It also featured four remixes from songs on the self-titled album
- The single for "Dismissed" was released to retail in 2002.
- The original Dance Praise game, released in 2005, featured "Dismissed". Also, the expansion pack featured "Even If".
