= 32nd GMA Dove Awards =

2001 US music awards ceremony

- Date: April 5, 2001
- Location: Grand Ole Opry House, Nashville, Tennessee
- Hosted by: Michael W. Smith

The 32nd Annual GMA Dove Awards were held on April 5, 2001 recognizing accomplishments of musicians for the year 2000.

The show was held at the Grand Ole Opry House in Nashville, Tennessee, and was hosted by Michael W. Smith.

== Award recipients ==
Song of the Year

- "Redeemer" by Nicole C. Mullen; Seat of the Pants Music (ASCAP), Wordspring Music, Inc., Lil' Jas' Music (SESAC)

Songwriter of the Year

- Nicole C. Mullen

Male Vocalist of the Year

- Steven Curtis Chapman

Female Vocalist of the Year

- Nichole Nordeman

Group of the Year

- Third Day

Artist of the Year

- Third Day

New Artist of the Year

- Plus One

Producer of the Year

- Brown Bannister

Southern Gospel Album of the Year

- I Do Believe by Gaither Vocal Band; Bill Gaither, Guy Penrod, Michael Sykes; Spring Hill Music Group

Southern Gospel Recorded Song of the Year

- "God Is Good All The Time" from God Is Good by Gaither Vocal Band; Tina Sadler; Spring Hill Music Group

Inspirational Album of the Year

- Home by Fernando Ortega; John Andrew Schreiner; Myrrh Records

Inspirational Recorded Song of the Year

- "Blessed" from Live For You by Rachael Lampa; Ginny Owens, Cindy Morgan; Word Records

Pop/Contemporary Album of the Year

- This Is Your Time by Michael W. Smith; Bryan Lenox; Reunion Records

Pop/Contemporary Recorded Song of the Year

- "Redeemer" by Nicole C. Mullen; Nicole C. Mullen; Word Records

Contemporary Gospel Album of the Year (Formerly Contemporary Black Gospel)

- Purpose By Design by Fred Hammond & Radical For Christ; Fred Hammond; Verity Records

Contemporary Gospel Recorded Song of the Year (Formerly Contemporary Black Gospel)

- "Alabaster Box" from Alabaster Box by Cece Winans; Janice Sjostran; Wellspring Gospel, Sparrow Records

Traditional Gospel Album of the Year(Formerly Traditional Black Gospel)

- You Can Make It by Shirley Caesar; Bubba Smith, Shirley Caesar, Michael Mathis; Myrrh Records, Black Music Division

Traditional Gospel Recorded Song of the Year (Formerly Traditional Black Gospel)

- "We Fall Down" from Live In London & More by Donnie McClurkin; Kyle Matthews; Verity Records

Urban Recorded Song of the Year

- "Shackles (Praise You)" from Thankful by Mary Mary; Warryn Campbell, Erica Atkins, Trecina Atkins; Columbia Records

Country Album of the Year

- (insufficient number of eligible entries)

Country Recorded Song of the Year

- "Baptism" from Inspirational Journey by Randy Travis; Mickey Cates; Atlantic Records

Rock Album of the Year

- Tree63 by Tree63; Andrew Philip, Eh Holden; Inpop Records

Rock Recorded Song of the Year

- "Sky Falls Down" from Time by Third Day; Mac Powell, Mark Lee, Tai Andersoon, Brad Avery, David Carr; Essential Records

Hard Music Album of the Year

- Above by Pillar; Travis Wyrick; Flickerrecords.Com

Hard Music Recorded Song of the Year

- "Point #1" from Point #1 by Chevelle; Pete Loefller, Sam Loeffler, Joe Loeffler; Squint Entertainment

Rap/Hip Hop Album of the Year

- The Plan by Raze; Michael-Anthony Taylor, Tedd Tjornhom; Forefront Records

Rap/Hip Hop Recorded Song of the Year

- "All Around The World" from Power by Raze; Ja'marc Davis, Zarc Porter, Mark Pennells; Forefront Records

Modern Rock Album of the Year

- Jordan's Sister by Kendall Payne; Ron Aniello, Glen Ballard; Sparrow Records

Modern Rock Recorded Song of the Year

- "Dive" from Supernatural by DC Talk; Toby McKeehan, Michael Tait, Kevin Max, Mark Heimermann; Forefront Records

Instrumental Album of the Year

- Lights Of Madrid by Phil Keaggy; Phil Keaggy; Word Artisan Records

Praise And Worship Album of the Year

- Offerings: A Worship Album by Third Day; Monroe Jones, Mac Powell, Mark Lee, Tai Anderson, Brad Avery, David Carr, Joey Canaday; Essential Records

Children's Music Album of the Year

- A Queen, a King, and a Very Blue Berry - Veggietunes; Kurt Heinecke, Mike Nawrocki; Big Idea Productions

Musical of the Year

- Tie: 2,000 Decembers Ago; Joel Lindsey, Russell Mauldin; Brentwood-Benson Music Publishing
- Tie: Redeemer; Claire Cloninger; Dave Williamson; Word Music

Youth/Children's Musical of the Year

- Friends 4ever; Karla Worley, Steven V. Tayloy, Seth Worley, Peter Kipley, Michael W. Smith; Word Music

Choral Collection Album of the Year

- God Is Working; Carol Cymbala; Brooklyn Tabernacle Music

Special Event Album of the Year

- City on a Hill: Songs of Worship and Praise by Jars of Clay, Sixpence None the Richer, Third Day, Caedmon's Call, The Choir, Gene Eugene, Sonicflood, Peter Furler, FFH; Steve Hindalong; Essential Records

Short Form Music Video of the Year

- Rock The Party (Off The Hook) by P.O.D.; Angela Jones; Marcos Siega; Atlantic Records

Long Form Music Video of the Year

- A Farewell Celebration by The Cathedrals; Bryan Bateman, Bill Gaither, Dennis Glore; Spring House Music Group

Recorded Music Packaging of the Year

- Roaring Lambs; Buddy Jackson, Karinne Caulkins/Jackson; Karinne Caulkins/Jackson; Ben Pearson; Squint Entertainment

Bluegrass Recorded Song of the Year

- "Are You Afraid To Die" from Soldier of the Cross by Ricky Skaggs and Kentucky Thunder; Ira Louvin, Charlie Louvin, Eddie Hill; Skaggs Family Records

Spanish Language Album of the Year

- Solo El Amor by Miguel Angel Guerra; Hal S. Batt; Word Latin

Enhanced CD of the Year

- (insufficient number of eligible entries)

Urban Album of the Year

- Thankful by Mary Mary; Warryn "Baby Dubb" Campbell; Columbia Records

Bluegrass Album of the Year

- Inspirational Journey by Randy Travis; Kyle Lehning; Atlantic Records
