= Exodus (Plus One album) =

Studio album by Plus One
- Released: November 18, 2003
- Recorded: 2003
- Genre: Pop rock, CCM
- Length: 38:15
- Label: Inpop
- Producer: Plus One, Peter Furler, Jeff Frankenstein

Plus One chronology
Christmas (2002)	Exodus (2003)

Alternative cover

Singles from Exodus
- 1. "Be Love"; 2. "Circle"

Exodus is the fourth and final studio album released by Plus One. This is the first time releasing an album without their former members Jeremy Mhire and Jason Perry. This is also their first album that was not released under Atlantic Records but instead released by Inpop.

The Rocky Mount Telegram praised the band's transformation from a five person to a three man band, saying that Exodus showed they had successfully completed this transition with the quality of music presented.

== Track listing ==
No.	Title	Writer(s)	Length
1.	"Outlaw"	Cole, Combs	3:07
2.	"Tonight"	Cole, Combs, Walters	4:01
3.	"Be Love"	Cole, Combs, Walters	3:53
4.	"Sea of Angels"	Cole, Combs, Walters	4:22
5.	"Poor Man"	Cole, Combs, Walters	3:25
6.	"Quest of Many Trails"	Cole, Combs	2:52
7.	"Exodus"	Cole, Combs	4:16
8.	"Circle"	Cole, Combs, Walters	3:26
9.	"Here I Am to Worship"	Tim Hughes	4:40
10.	"Like a Kite"	Cole, Combs	4:13
Total length:			38:15

== Personnel ==
Plus One

- Nate Cole – lead vocals
- Gabe Combs – keyboards, guitars, bass, backing vocals
- Nathan Walters – keyboards, acoustic piano, backing vocals

Additional musicians

- Jeff Frankenstein – keyboards, programming
- Dan Brigham – bass
- Wade Jaynes – bass (8)
- Jamie Davis – drums

== Production ==
- Plus One – producers
- Peter Furler – producer
- Jeff Frankenstein – producer
- Dan Rudin – engineer, mixing (6)
- Joe Costa – additional engineer
- Tony Palacios – mixing (1, 5, 8, 9)
- F. Reid Shippen – mixing (2, 4, 7)
- J.R. McNeely – mixing (3, 10)
- Kenzie Butler – mix assistant (1, 5, 8, 9)
- Kevin Pickle – mix assistant (1, 5, 8, 9)
- Lee Bridges – mix assistant (2, 4, 7)
- Richard Dodd – mastering
- Ben Frank Design – art direction, design, travel photography
- Kelly Kerr – band photography

Studios

- Recorded at Bridge Street Studios (Franklin, Tennessee).
- Mixed at Bridge Street Studios and The Sound Kitchen (Franklin, Tennessee); Sound Stage Studios and Emerald Sound Studios (Nashville, Tennessee).
- Mastered at Vital Recordings (Nashville, Tennessee).
