= Different Kind of Free =

Studio album by ZOEgirl
- Released: September 16, 2003
- Recorded: 2002–2003
- Studios: Antenna Studios, The Loft and Sound Stage Studios (Nashville, Tennessee).
- Genres: Pop rock; CCM
- Length: 48:53
- Label: Sparrow
- Producers: Tedd T; Lynn Nichols; Aurel M

ZOEgirl chronology
Mix of Life (2002)	Different Kind of Free (2003)	Room to Breathe (2005)

Singles from this album
- 1. "You Get Me" Released: June 22, 2003; 2. "Feel Alright"; 3. "Beautiful Name" Released: February 15, 2004

Professional ratings
Review scores
Source	Rating
AllMusic	4/5 stars
CCM Magazine	B
CCMmagazine.com	B+
Chicago Tribune	C+
Cross Rhythms	9/10 squares
Christianity Today (Herman)	A-
Christianity Today (Farias)	3.5/5 stars
Jesus Freak Hideout	4/5 stars
USA Today	C

Different Kind of Free is the third studio album by the American Christian pop girl group ZOEgirl. It was released on September 16, 2003, through Sparrow Records and was produced by Lynn Nichols, Robert "Aurel M" Marvin, Damon Riley and Tedd T. "You Get Me", "Beautiful Name" and "Feel Alright" were released as radio singles. Different Kind of Free marks the band's departure from the bubblegum pop music of their two previous albums, in favor of a pop rock sound.

== Background ==
ZOEgirl's Mix of Life was released on September 24, 2002. This remix album's Trip Rock Mix of "I Believe" foreshadowed the girl group's transition from bubblegum pop music to pop rock music.

During the autumn of 2002, Chrissy Conway-Katina started working on a draft for the lead single "You Get Me" with her future husband James Katina. Its chorus remained the same in the finished version of the song.

On February 2, 2003, an animated banner appeared on ZOEgirl's official website, encouraging visitors to "listen to the [Trip Rock] remix" of ZOEgirl's hit single "I Believe". Those who participated in this activity were instructed to listen to the original, pop version of "I Believe". Afterwards, they listened to the Trip Rock remix of "I Believe". Finally, they would comment on the remix, indicating whether or not they enjoyed it.

The album's official release date was announced on May 22, 2003, via the group's official website. "You Get Me" was released to radio stations on June 22, 2003. On July 15, 2003, ZOEgirl announced the album's title: Different Kind of Free. The lead single "You Get Me" was released to retail stores on July 24, 2003.

== Release ==
Different Kind of Free peaked on the Billboard 200 at No. 149. It reached No. 9 on Billboard's Christian Albums chart, and No. 4 on the Billboard Top Heatseekers Chart.

=== Reception ===
Despite the girl group's musical transition, the album received generally favorable reviews among Christian music critics. Jesus Freak Hideout stated in their review: "ZOEgirl strips away the electronic sugar and spice to offer up the smoothest transition from pop to pop/rock since Rebecca St. James made the same move in the mid-nineties." CCM Magazine said that "No. offers plenty of good advice on ways to be different and, in this case, godly kinds of girls."

== Track listing ==
No.	Title	Writer(s)	Theme verse	Length
1.	"Beautiful Name"	Alisa Childers, Chrissy Conway, Kristin Swinford, Lynn Nichols, Tedd T	Acts 4:12	4:47
2.	"You Get Me"	Conway, James Katina	Psalm 139:1–3	3:48
3.	"Inside Out"	Childers, Conway, Swinford, Nichols, James Katina	1 Peter 3:3–4	3:16
4.	"Love Me For Me"	Swinford, Nichols, Tjornhom, Jarod McBride	Romans 15:7	3:32
5.	"Unbroken"	Childers, Conway, Swinford, Nichols, Tjornhom, Marc Byrd	Psalm 34:18	4:59
6.	"Wait"	Childers, Conway, Swinford, Tjornhom	Psalm 142:6	4:34
7.	"Feel Alright"	Childers, Conway, Swinford, Nichols, Tjornhom	Hebrews 12:1	3:10
8.	"She"	Childers, Conway, Swinford, Nichols, Tjornhom	John 8:7	4:49
9.	"Contagious"	Childers, Conway, Swinford, Nichols	2 Corinthians 2:14	5:35
10.	"Different Kind of Free"	Childers, Conway, Swinford, Nichols, Mat Kearney, Robert Marvin	John 8:32	4:33
11.	"Life To Me"	Childers, Conway, Swinford, Nichols, Tjornhom	Psalm 89:5–6	5:50
Total length:				48:53

== Personnel ==
ZOEgirl

- Alisa Childers – vocals, additional guitars (5, 8), BGV arrangements
- Chrissy Conway – vocals, additional percussion (5), BGV arrangements
- Kristin Swinford – vocals, additional guitars (5), BGV arrangements

Additional musicians

- Tedd T – programming (1–9, 11), bass guitar (1, 3–7, 9, 11), additional BGV arrangements
- Damon Riley – programming (1–9, 11)
- Rusty Varenkamp – additional programming (1–9, 11), additional vocal arrangements
- Robert "Aurel M" Marvin – all instruments except electric guitar (10)
- Lynn Nichols – electric guitars, acoustic guitars (1–9, 11), additional vocal arrangements
- David May – additional guitars (2)
- James Katina – bass guitar (2), additional backing vocals (2)
- Brent Milligan – bass guitar (4, 8)
- Dan Needham – drums (1–9, 11)
- Antonio Neal – additional backing vocals (2)
- Mat Kearney – rap (10)

Production

- Lynn Nichols – executive producer, producer (5)
- Tedd T – producer (1–9, 11), recording, editing, mixing (1–9, 11)
- Damon Riley – additional production (1–9, 11), additional recording
- Aurel M – producer (10)
- James Baird – additional recording, drum recording, mixing (1–4, 7)
- Rusty Varenkamp – additional recording, editing
- Allen Salmon – drum recording assistant, editing
- F. Reid Shippen – mixing (10)
- Lee Bridges – mix assistant (10)
- Richard Dodd – mastering
- Jan Cook – art direction
- Beth Lee – photographic direction
- Alexis Goodman – graphic design
- Kristin Barlowe – photography
- Brian Smoot – make-up
- Giovanni Guliano – hair stylist
- Christiév Carothers – stylist
