= 31st GMA Dove Awards =

2000 US music awards ceremony

- Date: April 20, 2000
- Location: Grand Ole Opry House, Nashville, Tennessee
- Hosted by: Kathie Lee Gifford

The 31st Annual GMA Dove Awards were held on April 20, 2000, recognizing accomplishments of musicians for the year 1999. The show was held at the Grand Ole Opry House in Nashville, Tennessee, and was hosted by Kathie Lee Gifford.

== Award recipients ==
Song

- "This Is Your Time" by Michael W. Smith & Wes King

Songwriter

- Michael W. Smith

Male Vocalist

- Steven Curtis Chapman

Female Vocalist

- Jaci Velasquez

Group

- Sixpence None the Richer

Artist

- Steven Curtis Chapman

New Artist

- Ginny Owens

Producer

- Brown Bannister

Southern Gospel Album

- God Is Good by The Gaither Vocal Band

Southern Gospel Recorded Song

- "Healing" from Faithful by The Cathedrals

Inspirational Album

- Be Still My Soul by Selah (Jason Kyle, Todd Smith, Allan Hall)

Inspirational Recorded Song

- "I Will Follow Christ" from Clay Crosse by Clay Crosse, Steve Siler

Pop/Contemporary Album

- Speechless by Steven Curtis Chapman

Pop/Contemporary Recorded Song

- "Dive" from Speechless by Steven Curtis Chapman

Contemporary Gospel Album (Formerly Contemporary Black Gospel)

- Anointed by Anointed (Keith Crouch, Tony Rich, Chris Harris, Mark Heimermann, Wayne Tester, Kern Brantley)

Contemporary Gospel Recorded Song (Formerly Contemporary Black Gospel)

- "Power" from The Prince of Egypt-Inspirational by Fred Hammond and Radical for Christ

Traditional Gospel Album (Formerly Traditional Black Gospel)

- Healing—Live In Detroit by Richard Smallwood with Vision

Traditional Gospel Recorded Song (Formerly Traditional Black Gospel)

- "God Can" from God Can & God Will by Dottie Peoples

Urban Recorded Song

- "Anything Is Possible" from Anointed by Anointed (Nee-C Walls-Allen, Steve Crawford, Da'dra Crawford Greathouse, Keith Crouch, John Smith, Sherree Ford Payne)

Country Album

- A Glen Campbell Christmas by Glen Campbell

Country Recorded Song

- "Angel Band" from Vestal and Friends by Vestal Goodman, George Jones

Rock Album

- Time by Third Day

Rock Recorded Song

- "Get Down" from Underdog by Audio Adrenaline (Mark Stuart, Bob Herdman, Will McGinniss, Ben Cissell, Tyler Burkum)

Hard Music Album

- Point #1 by Chevelle

Hard Music Recorded Song

- "Mia" from Point #1 by Chevelle (Pete Loeffler, Joe Loeffler, Sam Loeffler)

Rap/Hip Hop Album

- Power by Raze

Rap/Hip Hop Recorded Song

- "They All Fall Down” from Grammatical Revolution by Grits (T Carter, S Jones, R Robbins, O Price)

Modern Rock Album

- Candycoatedwaterdrops by Plumb

Modern Rock Recorded Song

- "Unforgetful You" from If I Left the Zoo by Jars of Clay (Dan Haseltine, Matt Odmark, Steve Mason, Charlie Lowell)

Instrumental Album

- Majesty And Wonder by Phil Keaggy

Praise And Worship Album

- Sonicflood by SONICFLOOd (Bryan Lenox, Jeff Deyo, Jason Halbert, Dwayne Larring, Aaron Blanton)

Children's Music Album

- Larry-Boy: The Soundtrack by Veggie Tales (Kurt Heinecke, Mike Nawrocki, Masaki, David Mullen)

Musical

- A Christmas To Remember by Claire Cloninger, Gary Rhodes

Youth/Children's Musical

- Lord, I Lift Your Name On High by Karla Worley, Steven V. Taylor

Choral Collection

- High & Lifted Up by Carol Cymbala

Special Event Album

- Streams by Cindy Morgan, Maire Brennan, Michael McDonald, Sixpence None the Richer, Chris Rodriguez, Michelle Tumes, 4HIM, Delirious?, Amy Grant, Jaci Velasquez, Burlap to Cashmere, Point of Grace

Short Form Music Video

- This Is Your Time by Michael W. Smith (Amy Marsh)

Long Form Music Video

- The Supernatural Experience by dc Talk (Eric Welch, Dan Pitts)

Recorded Music Packaging

- Streams by Various (Loren Balman, Chuck Hargett)

Bluegrass Recorded Song

- "So Fine" from So Fine by Lewis Family

Spanish Language Album

- Llegar A Ti by Jaci Velasquez

Enhanced CD

- Without Condition by Ginny Owens

Urban Album

- (insufficient number of eligible entries)

Bluegrass Album

- Kentucky Bluegrass by The Bishops
