= Raze (Christian pop group) =

US musical group

- Origin: Tulsa, Oklahoma
- Genre: CCM
- Years active: 1997–2001
- Label: ForeFront
- Past members: Donnie Lewis; Ja'Marc Davis; J.D. Webb; Mizzie Logan; Todd Hanebrink

Raze was a Tulsa, Oklahoma-based Christian pop group formed by vocalists Donnie Lewis, Ja'Marc Davis, J.D. Webb, and Mizzie Logan. Throughout their career group scored two No. 1 singles on the Christian contemporary hit radio (CHR) charts: "Always and Forever (BFF)" and "More Than a Dream".

== History ==
=== 1997-1998: Inception and Raze ===
Raze was formed in 1997. During that year, they obtained a record deal with Movation Productions in the United Kingdom. "I Need Your Love" was released as a radio single in the United States and "Shine" played on Cross Rhythms radio stations in the UK. The group released their first, self-titled studio album on August 1, 1997. Raze signed to Forefront Records in January 1998.

=== 1999: That's The Way EP, Davis temporarily leaves group and Power ===
The group released "That's The Way" as a radio single in the United States on January 11, 1999. This track was also featured on an EP of the same name following a record deal with Forefront Records, making it their first disc to be released in the USA. Shortly thereafter, their second single "Always & Forever" entered the Christian CHR charts on March 22, 1999 at the No. 20 position. It peaked at No. 1 on May 24, 1999. In June 1999, Ja'Marc Davis temporarily left Raze after privately discussing with the rest of the group about a situation not yet known to the public. During the following month on July 13, 1999, Raze released Power as their first studio album in the United States. It featured three tracks from the group's debut studio album with some minor changes. For example, "Listen" was renamed to "Can You Hear Me Now" for this release, and "Shouldn't It Be Me" has different background music.

=== 2000: Davis returns and The Plan ===
After a year of counseling, Ja'Marc Davis returned to Raze. J.D. Webb left the group and was replaced by Hanebrink

=== 2001: "More Than a Dream", scandal and disbanding ===
Raze scored their second No. 1 and last radio single, "More Than a Dream", on January 22, 2001. The group began a tour on March 1, 2001 to promote The Plan. On that same day, Ja'Marc Davis was arrested and charged for eleven counts related with child sexual abuse. Although the group initially planned to continue the tour despite this, they cancelled it a week later and only made a few rescheduled stops without Davis. Shortly thereafter, Raze slowly disappeared from the Christian music scene. Later on November 1, 2001, Davis pleaded guilty to the charges. Raze officially disbanded on November 12, 2001.

=== 2002–present: Aftermath ===
Lewis toured with the rock opera "!Hero" and released a solo album called My Story in 2006. She also sang backup vocals in the KJ-52 song "I Can Call on You" for his 2005 album Behind the Musik (A Boy Named Jonah).

In 2003, Webb produced, sang, and wrote songs for the album Oasis Praise: Bring It On. Webb's music has been featured on numerous television shows and he is a resident songwriter and vocalist for Days of Our Lives. His 2008 Christmas Single "Everything I Need This Christmas" was well received by radio, and his debut solo CD "The Introduction" was released in Spring of 2009.

== Controversy ==
=== Sexual abuse charges ===
I want to formally release an apology to Raze fans around the world who followed our music and believed in what we were doing on our mission. I committed a heinous offense in my violation of trust, respect and honor of the individuals involved in my sins. I was young, self centered and immature, not taking full account of the lives that would forever be impacted by my shameful acts.

— Ja'Marc Davis.

In the middle of 1999, Ja'Marc Davis confessed to the other members of Raze and the band manager that he was having an inappropriate sexual relationship with a thirteen-year-old backup dancer from the group. On March 1, 2001, Ja'Marc Davis was arrested and charged with five counts of lewd molestation, three counts of rape by instrumentation, and three counts of forcible sodomy. The victim was a thirteen-year-old female backup dancer when she was abused from 1998 to 1999. Shortly thereafter, numerous Christian radio stations ceased to play Raze's music and Christian retailers such as Berean Christian Stores discontinued sales of Raze music. The Parable Group also cancelled the publication of a promotional article for Raze. The WOW series re-release of two DVDs in 2002 omitted Raze's music videos, which were previously sold in the series on VHS.

Eight months later, Davis pleaded guilty to those charges on November 1, 2001. The band formally disbanded on November 12, 2001. Davis was sentenced to five years in minimum security prison on December 17, 2001.

On October 10, 2012, Ja'Marc Davis formally apologized to the girl involved in the sexual scandal as well as all Raze fans.

== Discography ==
=== Albums ===
Year	Album	Chart positions	
Year	Album	Billboard Top Contemporary Christian	Billboard Heatseekers
1998	That's the Way (EP)	-	-
1999	Power	11	15
2000	The Plan	31	25

=== Singles ===
Year	Single	US Christian CHR	UK Cross	Album
1999	"That's The Way"	4	-	That's the Way EP
1999	"Always and Forever (BFF)"	1	1	That's the Way EP
1999	"Place In My Heart"	3	3	Power
2000	"All Around the World"	6	3	Power
2000	"The Plan"	8	4	The Plan
2001	"More Than a Dream"	1	-	The Plan

=== Music videos ===
List of music videos, showing year released and director(s)
Title	Year	Producer	Director	Ref.
"Always and Forever (BFF)"	1999	?		^{[note 1]}
"Place In My Heart"	1999	?		^{[note 1]}
"The Plan"	?	?		^{[note 2]}

== Awards and nominations ==
=== GMA Dove Awards ===
Year	Category	Nominee	Result
2000	New Artist of the Year	Raze	Nominated
2000	Rap/Hip-hop/Dance Album of the Year	Power	Won
2001	Rap/Hip-hop/Dance Album of the Year	The Plan	Won
2001	Rap/Hip-hop/Dance Recorded Song of the Year	"All Around the World"	Won
2001	Rap/Hip-hop/Dance Recorded Song of the Year	"More Than A Dream"	Nominated

== Notes ==
- ^1 "Always and Forever (BFF)" was released on March 13, 1999, while "Place In My Heart" was released on November 27, 1999. These music videos were available on VHS volumes WOW 2000 and WOW Hits 2001, respectively. After the arrest of Ja'Marc Davis on March 1, 2001, the WOW series banned both music videos, leaving them unavailable in the 2002 DVD re-releases, despite the back cover on the WOW Hits 2001 DVD claiming that "Place In My Heart" was included.
- ^2 "The Plan" did not receive a public release. The video was leaked on April 11, 2007.
