= You Get Me (song) =

Single by ZOEgirl
- B-side: "I Believe" (Trip Rock mix)
- Released: June 22, 2003
- Genre: Rock
- Length: 3:48
- Label: Sparrow
- Songwriters: Chrissy Conway-Katina, James Katina

ZOEgirl singles chronology
"Dismissed"	"You Get Me"	"Feel Alright"

Audio sample
- You Get Me: file; help

"You Get Me" is the first single from ZOEgirl's third studio album, Different Kind of Free. It was written by Chrissy Conway-Katina and her husband James Katina.

Like "With All of My Heart", it was a No. 1 hit on the R&R Christian Adult Contemporary chart and received over 50,000 spins on the radio. There was also a retail CD single released. A music video was created to promote this song.

== Background ==
Chrissy Conway-Katina's inspiration for this song came from comparing her pre-Christian past to the Christian life and ministry she had at the time of writing. She "was always looking for somewhere to fit in" during the early years of her life. After she started following Jesus, her perspective of life took a drastic change. She then became "less concerned with fitting in with the world and more concerned with belonging to God."

The intimate relationship she shares with Christ is what fuels this song: "God is truly the only one who knows my thoughts before I think them. He's the only one who knew every day of my life before I even took my first breath. No one else but God could ever love me and accept me for who I am the way that He can. He's the only one who gets me.”

== Composition ==
The song's intro and two verses are "gentle, minor-chorded introductory guitar part[s]". The chorus, on the other hand, is full "of electric walls of sound and pounding drums." The harmonious vocals are comparable to those found in Point of Grace. The lyrics are inspired by Psalm 139, describing how the God of Christianity is the only one who truly and intimately knows and understands the life of an individual. The song exists to encourage those who are struggling, especially Christians.

== Chart performance ==
"You Get Me" charted on the Billboard Christian Songs starting June 30, 2003. It peaked at No. 2 for 4 consecutive weeks, from September 14 to October 11. This coincided with Different Kind of Free's release date of September 16, 2003. It was still in the Top 20 for a little over six and a half months following its release, on the week of January 17, 2004.

On the R&R Adult Contemporary chart, the song was a No. 1 hit.

== Music video ==
=== Development and release ===
The music video for "You Get Me" shows a lone blonde, struggling with her self-image, in the Mojave Desert

The music video for "You Get Me" was filmed in August 2003 the El Mirage Lake of the Mojave Desert. The day of the shoot was very warm at 108 °F (42 °C) and very windy. Portions of the music video were also twilight horizon shots. It was directed by Stan Morse and produced by Bob Sexton of Noisivision Studios. The video was presented in the 1.33̅:1 aspect ratio, which was common for home video at that time. There were initially plans to release a DVD single for "You Get Me" in November 2003, similarly to ZOEgirl's Real Life video featuring the "Dismissed" music video. However, those plans were scrapped. The only retail video featuring the music video for "You Get Me" is the WOW Hits 2004 DVD.

=== Synopsis ===
Towards the end of the "You Get Me" music video, ZOEgirl stands near a graffiti wall proclaiming "I'm OK"

The scenery for this music video consists mostly of the girl group singing in the daytime desert. This can be seen for the first few seconds of the video, filmed in black and white. Colour first appears once the scene changes to a lone blonde in the blue sky desert. She appears to be in a bathroom scene, as she sits near a bathtub, a toilet sink and a floating mirror. A similar scene can be found starting at the second verse, where a lone brunette enters what appears to be a bedroom scene. After the song's bridge, they sing in the twilight desert.

=== Reception ===
This video was nominated for the Dove Awards of 2004 but lost to Stacie Orrico's "(There's Gotta Be) More to Life".

In Canada, the music video peaked at the No. 1 spot on YourMusicZoneTV, a Top 10 countdown similar to Total Request Live that airs on CTS and Vision TV.

== Track listing ==
- Retail CD single
1. "You Get Me"
2. "You Get Me" (radio mix)
3. "I Believe" (trip rock mix)

== Charts ==
=== Weekly charts ===
Chart (2003–2004)	Peak position
R&R Christian adult contemporary	1
R&R Christian CHR	2
The Rock Across Australia	13

=== Year-end charts ===
Chart	Position
Australia (TRAA) 2003	58
Australia (TRAA) 2004	31

== Release history ==
Release format	Release date
United States radio airplay	June 22, 2003
CD single	July 24, 2003
Premiere Performance Plus	July 28, 2003
Music video	October 7, 2003
Australia radio airplay	November 3, 2003
