= With All of My Heart =

Single by ZOEgirl

from the album Life
- Released: October 8, 2001
- Recorded: 2001
- Genre: Pop
- Length: 4:16
- Label: Sparrow
- Songwriter(s): Joe Priolo, Chrissy Conway-Katina
- Producer(s): Tedd T, Joe Priolo

ZOEgirl singles chronology
""No You""	"With All of My Heart"	""Here and Now""

"With All of My Heart" is the first single from ZOEgirl's second studio album, Life. It was written by Joe Priolo and Chrissy Conway-Katina. It was ZOEgirl's first No. 1 radio hit, and their only song to reach No. 1 on the Christian contemporary hit radio chart.

== Background ==
The song is based on the Great Commandment.

== Composition ==
"With All of My Heart" is a pumped-up worship song.

== Charts ==
=== Peak position ===
Chart (2001–2002)	Peak position
R&R Christian adult contemporary	3
R&R Christian CHR	1
The Rock Across Australia	2
