= Plus One (band) =

American Christian pop boy band

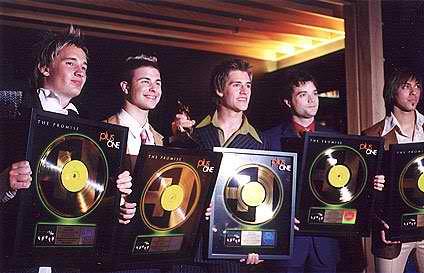
- Plus One (from left to right: Combs, Cole, Perry, Walters, Mhire)

Background information
- Origin: Tennessee, U.S.
- Genres: Christian pop
- Years active: 1999–2004, 2014
- Labels: Warner/Atlantic, Inpop
- Past members: Nate Cole; Jason Perry; Jeremy Mhire; Nathan Walters; Gabe Combs

Plus One was an American Christian pop boy band which formed in 1999, disbanded in 2004, and briefly reunited in 2014. The group's line-up consisted of Nate Cole, Jason Perry, Jeremy Mhire, Nathan Walters and Gabe Combs. The group enjoyed their greatest success with the release of their debut album, The Promise (2000). The group then released Obvious (2002). Jason Perry and Jeremy Mhire left the band in 2003, and the remaining three members signed a deal with Inpop Records. A year later they released Exodus; their first album as a trio. After the album's supporting tour, they disbanded in 2004 to pursue other interests. Walters, Combs, and Perry briefly reunited in 2014, releasing "My All".

== History ==
=== Formation and early years: 1999–2000 ===
Plus One began to take shape as early as 1999 and formed by a manager named Mitchell Solarek, when 18-year-old Sacramento, California-boy Nate Cole was joined by 20-year-old Gabe Combs of Pittsburg, California, 21-year-old Nathan Walters of Lakeland, Florida and the 19-year-old Jeremy Mhire of Springfield, Missouri, who had been engrossed in vocal studies as a junior on full scholarship to Southwest Missouri State University. Cole and Combs had known each other from mutual music circles while growing up in Northern California and Walters had initially heard about the new group through an acquaintance of Cole's. The group came to complete fruition with the arrival of 17-year old Jason Perry of Madison, Indiana, who up to that moment had been focusing on his role as starting fullback and defensive end for his high school football team. Perry is the youngest member of the group. The name Plus One refers to the members of the group, plus God. Atlantic Records pursued the formation of a boy band motivated by the success of such secular bands as 'N Sync and Backstreet Boys. Auditions were held, and these five young men, who were all raised in the Assembly of God Church, three of them being pastors' sons, came together and melded as a group, all firmly believing that the Lord had brought them together to be in Christian ministry, to do great things for the Gospel. Plus One got together as a quintet.

=== The Promise and "Remarkable Success": 2000-2001 ===
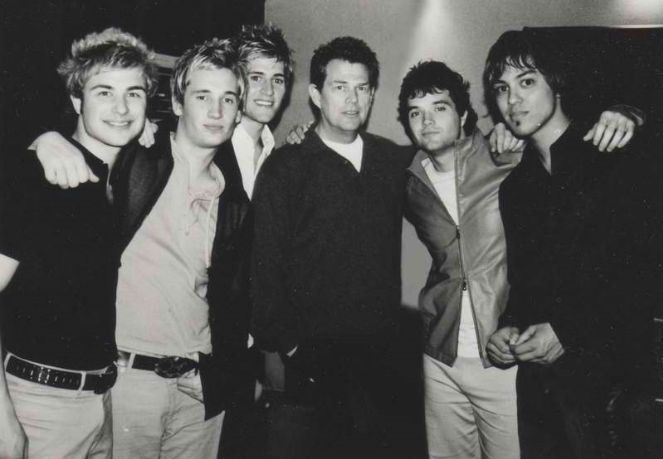
Plus One with David Foster in 2001

Their successful debut album, The Promise, was released in May 2000, and enjoyed great success in the Christian pop scene. The Promise went gold with more than 500,000 album sales. Producer David Foster was one of the producers on Plus One's albums. They had two No. 1 Christian radio hits, "Written on My Heart", which was No. 1 on the charts for two months, and "God Is in This Place" followed by "Last Flight Out", "Here in My Heart", and the other radio singles "Run to You" and "Soul Tattoo". They found themselves touring with such Christian artists as Jaci Velasquez, Rachael Lampa, and Stacie Orrico. In 2000, they appeared in an episode of hit soap opera Days of Our Lives to perform on the show. They performed "Grown-Up Christmas List" with Monica on ABC's Christmas Eve special, "'Twas the Night Before Christmas". In addition, Plus One was featured as one of the new artists of 2000 on TNN's annual television special, "Class of 2000". They gave performances at the 2000 Democratic National Convention, and several major league sporting events including games with the Los Angeles Lakers, Chicago Bulls, and Atlanta Hawks. The band was featured on Teen Magazine Online and performed at Atlanta Fest and the Raggedy Ann Festival in Arcola, IL, as part of their tour schedule. The following year in 2001, they appeared as juvenile kids who form a group while in jail on the TV series Touched by an Angel and they were nominated for a Dove Award as New Artist of the Year. The group recorded a soundtrack called "With All Your Heart" and it was included on the soundtrack of the Warner Brothers film, Pokémon: The Movie 2000 followed by "I Need a Miracle" from the Christian Bible-based film Left Behind: The Movie released in 2000. They also appear on Natalie Grant's album Stronger with the song "Whenever You Need Somebody" in 2001. They also covered the American patriotic song "America the Beautiful" and they performed in Luis Palau Festival in 2001.

=== Obvious and Christmas: 2001-2002 ===
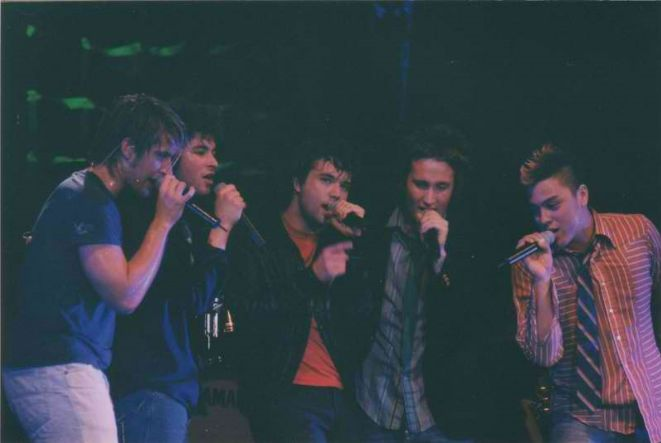
Plus One performing their Obvious Tour in 2002

Returning from the Promise tour, Plus One went back into the studio to record songs for a new album, this time including some of their own material, tracks like "Use Me", a ballad called "You", "Under the Influence", "Kick Me", and "Going Crazy". A strong beat and guitar riffs defined these new tracks, distinguishing them from the lighter sound of the group's first recording. Obvious was released in February 2002, and sold twice as many copies in its first week of release as Promise had. It hit the number-one spot on the Christian charts immediately. Three of the album's tracks, "Camouflage", "I Don't Care" and "Let Me Be the One", became hit singles on the top-ten Christian radio charts. In the fall of 2002 during their Obvious Tour, Plus One released Christmas, a collection of Christmas music. In addition their own renditions of "Silent Night", "O Little Town of Bethlehem", "What Child Is This?", "O Holy Night", "It's The Most Wonderful Time of the Year" and other Christmas standards, the album included some original compositions as well, including the opening track, "This Is Christmas", and "I Won't Forget This Christmas" and a song titled "Our Christmas Prayer" and "A Prayer for Every Year" which was released on WOW Christmas: Red in 2002.

=== Departure of Perry and Mhire, and Exodus: 2002-2003 ===
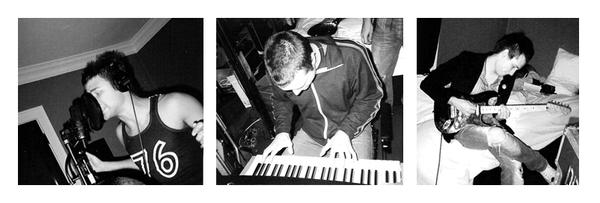
The New Plus One recording their new sound in 2003

In 2002, after completing touring for their Obvious tour and promoting their Christmas album, two members of Plus One were called to other ministries and obligations, Jason Perry left the group in 2003 followed by Jeremy Mhire leaving the remaining three members to carry on Plus One's music ministry. In 2003, the band was dropped from their label. Seeking to revamp their image, they signed a deal with Inpop Records and released their third album, the first time releasing an album without their two former members. Exodus. As a result, the band became a trio. Co-produced by former Newsboys frontman Peter Furler and keyboardist Jeff Frankenstein, Exodus marked a departure from the boy band image, leaving the all-out "pop" style for a more mature sound featuring keyboards, guitars and the band performing their own materials. Peter Furler said that "it's some of the best music I've ever been part of" and that he can feel justifiably proud of turning out this album. "Be Love" is the hit single on this album, and was followed by "Circle". The album contains all original songs, with the exception of a rendition of the Tim Hughes hit "Here I Am to Worship".

=== Break-up and Hiatus: 2004-2016 ===
In 2004, after completing the Exodus 04 tour, Plus One quietly parted ways with Inpop and with each other. On September 23, 2004, Nate Cole announced that Plus One would most likely be breaking up. Nate Cole and Gabe Combs went on to form Indie rock band Castledoor with their wives Liska Cole and Coury Combs and released 5 EP's and one album. In 2008, Nathan Walters went on to pursue a solo career, releasing one album called Escape in Nashville, TN. After Castledoor, Nate Cole and his wife Liska Cole started a duo band called Doom & Gloom and released home recordings. In 2011 Gabe Combs and Nathan Walters started a music production called Multitone Musik to merge their production and songwriting skills. In December 2016, Nate Cole released his first solo album Bad Beat.

=== Reunion: 2014 ===
On April 14, 2014, Plus One announced that they had reunited with three original members: Nathan Walters, Gabe Combs, and Jason Perry, who previously had quit the group in 2003. They also announced the release of their latest single, "My All", available on their official website and their Facebook page.

== Members ==
- Nate Cole (1999–2004) – vocals
- Jason Perry (1999–2003, 2014) – vocals
- Jeremy Mhire (1999–2003) – vocals
- Nathan Walters (1999–2004, 2014) – vocals, keyboards (2003–2004)
- Gabe Combs (1999–2004, 2014) – vocals, guitars (2003–2004)

=== Nate Cole ===
Nate Cole is a musician known for his continued dedication to music and his steadfast personal values. Throughout his career, he has remained actively engaged in pursuing his artistic work while balancing a full family life. Nate is married and a devoted father, often citing his family as a central source of inspiration and grounding. Faith has consistently played a significant role in both his personal and professional life, shaping his outlook and guiding his decisions.

=== Jason Perry ===
Jason Perry is a private individual known for his discreet personal life, having maintained a low profile since his early days in the public eye. Although he was not heavily involved in the music industry, he remains a faithful companion to his family and friends. His current occupation is unknown, but he was last reported to reside near Covington, Kentucky. The most recent sighting of Perry reported occurred in Indianapolis, Indiana, September 2024 where he frequently visited his younger girlfriend. The status of their relationship is unknown. Since 2024, he has not been seen by fans or the public, further contributing to his enigmatic presence. The last photo of him appears to be ‘Jason’ spending quality time with his family. Further proving his focus has been on family and not pursuing his music career.

== Discography ==
| Title | Details | Peak chart positions | | | |
| Title | Details | US | US Christian | US CCM | |
|---|---|---|---|---|---|
| The Promise | Released: May 24, 2000; Label: Atlantic Records; Formats: CD, music download | 76 | — | 1 | US: Gold |
| Obvious | Released: February 26, 2002; Label: Atlantic Records; Formats: CD, music download | 29 | 3 | 3 | |
| Christmas | Released: October 15, 2002; Label: Atlantic Records; Formats: CD, music download | — | — | 25 | |
| Exodus | Released: November 18, 2003; Label: Inpop Records; Formats: CD, music download | — | 17 | — | |
"—" denotes releases that did not chart or were not released in that country.

=== Compilation contributions ===
| Title | Album Details |
|---|---|
| Left Behind: The Movie Soundtrack | Song Title: "I Need a Miracle"; Year Released: October 3, 2000; Label: Reunion Records; Formats: CD, digital download |
| Pokémon: The Movie 2000 | Song Title: "With All Your Heart"; Year Released: July 18, 2000; Label: Atlantic Records; Formats: CD, digital download |
| WOW Hits 2001 | Song Title: "Written On My Heart"; Year Released: October 24, 2001; Label: Sparrow Records; Formats: CD, digital download |
| Radio Disney Jams, Vol. 4 | Song Title: "Last Flight Out"; Year Released: September 25, 2001; Label: Walt Disney Records; Formats: CD, digital download |
| WOW Hits 2002 | Song Title: "God Is in This Place"; Year Released: October 23, 2001; Label: Sparrow Records; Formats: CD, digital download |
| WOW Christmas: Red | Song Title: "A Prayer For Every Year"; Year Released: October 1, 2002; Label: Word Records; Formats: CD, digital download |
| WOW Hits 2003 | Song Title: "Camouflage"; Year Released: October 1, 2002; Label: Chordant; Formats: CD, digital download |
| WOW Worship: Red | Song Title: "Here I Am to Worship"; Year Released: March 9, 2004; Label: Word Records; Formats: CD, digital download |
| X 2004 | Song Title: "Poor Man"; Year Released: March 9, 2004; Label: Tooth & Nail Records; Formats: CD, digital download |

=== Singles ===
| Year | Title | Chart positions | Album |
| Year | Title | CCM | Album |
|---|---|---|---|
| 2000 | "Written on My Heart" | 1 | The Promise |
| 2000 | "God Is in This Place" | 1 | The Promise |
| 2000 | "Last Flight Out" | | The Promise |
| 2001 | "Here in My Heart" | | The Promise |
| 2001 | "My Life / The Promise" | | The Promise |
| 2001 | "Soul Tattoo" | | The Promise |
| 2002 | "Camouflage / Forever" | | Obvious |
| 2002 | "I Don't Care" | | Obvious |
| 2002 | "Let Me Be The One" ⟨‡⟩ | | Obvious |
| 2003 | "Be Love" | | Exodus |
| 2003 | "Circle" | | Exodus |
| 2014 | "My All" | | non-album single |

- ⟨‡⟩ "Let Me Be The One" was re-recorded by Jesse McCartney on his debut album Beautiful Soul, titled "Come to Me".

=== As a featured artist ===
| Year | Title | Chart positions | Album |
| Year | Title | CCM | Album |
|---|---|---|---|
| 2000 | "Grown-Up Christmas List" (Monica featuring Plus One) | — | Platinum Christmas |
| 2001 | "Second Thoughts" (Ashley Ballard featuring Plus One) | — | Get in the Booth |
| 2001 | "Whenever You Need Somebody" (Natalie Grant featuring Plus One) | — | Stronger |
"—" denotes releases that did not chart or were not released in that country.

=== On television ===
| 2001 | Touched by an Angel Season 7 episode 20 "Band of Angels" |

== Videography ==
| Title | Video details |
|---|---|
| Plus One: The Home Video | Released: 2001; Label: Atlantic Records |
| Plus One: Making of the Album | Released: 2002; Label: Atlantic Records |
