= Tedd T. =

Tedd T., born Tedd Andrew Tjornhom, is a music producer, songwriter, arranger, programmer, and engineer. He launched the independent record label Teleprompt Records in 2003 as a joint venture with Word/Warner Music Group. His interest in the music industry began when he was in his teens and growing up in Minneapolis, Minnesota. His early work with Dez Dickerson (an early member of Prince's band "The Revolution") served as an introduction to the influential Minneapolis scene and later led him to move to Nashville.

== Credits ==
Band	Album	Released	Role(s)
Versus	Stuff That Matters	1993	executive producer, programming, engineer, arranger, lyrics, keyboards
Al Denson	Do You Know This Man?	1995	arranger, keyboards, drums, and bass programming
Code of Ethics	Arms Around the World	1995	arranger, drums, keyboards, hammond organ, programming, producer, engineer, bass
Rebecca St. James	God	1996	arranger, programming, producer, engineer, fender rhodes, bass, harmonica, percussion, piano
Code of Ethics	Soulbait	1997	hammond organ, programming, producer, engineer, mellotron, clapping, wurlitzer, moog bass, synthesizer, piano
Geoff Moore	Threads	1997	producer
Rebecca St. James	Christmas	1997	arranger, guitar, keyboards, programming, producer, engineer, translation, loop, guitar
Bleach	Static (expanded edition)	1998	executive producer
Carman	Mission 3:16	1998	programming, remix programmer
Margaret Becker	Falling Forward	1998	programming, producer, bass
Rebecca St. James	Pray	1998	arranger, programming, producer, guitar
Delirious?	Mezzamorphis	1999	programming
Raze	The Plan	2000	producer, programming, engineer
Rebecca St. James	Transform	2000	producer, programming
Delirious?	Deeper: The D:Finitive Worship Experience	2001	producer, engineer
Jewel	This Way	2001	programming
Jump5	Jump5	2001	producer
Natalie Grant	Stronger	2001	producer, arranger, engineer, guitar
SHeDAISY	The Whole SHeBANG: All Mixed Up	2001	producer, programming
Stacie Orrico	Christmas Wish	2001	producer, arranger, engineer
ZOEgirl	Life	2001	producer, arranger, programming, engineer, mixing
Andy Hunter	Exodus	2002	arranger, producer, engineer, orchestration, mixing
Delirious?	Touch	2002	producer
Faith Hill	Cry	2002	programming
Newsboys	Newsboys Remixed	2002	programming, remixing
Plus One	Christmas	2002	programming, producer, engineer, mixing
Rachael Lampa	Blur	2002	programming, engineer, mixing, remix producer, bass
Rebecca St. James	Worship God	2002	performer
ZOEgirl	Mix of Life	2002	producer, programming, remixing, engineer, mixing
Jump5	Accelerate	2003	producer, engineer, editing, mixing, bass
Stacie Orrico	Stacie Orrico	2003	arranger, bass guitar, programming, producer, engineer, mixing
ZOEgirl	Different Kind of Free	2003	bass guitar, programming, producer, engineer, vocal arrangement, editing, mixing
ZOEgirl	Dismissed/Anything Is Possible	2003	producer
ZOEgirl	You Get Me	2003	producer, remixing
Avalon	The Creed	2004	guitar, programming, producer, engineer, editing, mixing
Jump5	Mix It Up	2004	programming, remixing, mixing, vocal producer
Mutemath	Reset (EP)	2004	producer, engineer, executive producer, editing, mixing
Rebecca St. James	Live Worship: Blessed Be...	2004	programming, producer, engineer, editing, mixing
Sanctus Real	Fight the Tide	2004	producer, mixing, overdub engineer
TobyMac	Welcome to Diverse City	2004	programming, engineer, editing, remixing, mixing
Andy Hunter	Life	2005	programming, producer, engineer, editing, mixing
David Crowder Band	A Collision	2005	co-producer
KJ-52	Behind the Musik (A Boy Named Jonah)	2005	producer
Rebecca St. James	If I Had One Chance to Tell You Something	2005	producer, engineer
Tobymac	Renovating Diverse City	2005	production / remixing
Mutemath	Mutemath	2006	producer
newsboys	Go	2006	producer
Britt Nicole	Say It	2007	producer
Mutemath	Transformers Motion Picture Soundtrack	2007	producer, engineer, mixer
Newsboys	GO Remixed	2007	producer, re-mixer
Robbie Seay Band	Give Yourself Away	2007	producer
Newsboys	Houston We Are GO	2008	co-producer
Article One	Colors and Sounds	May 27, 2008	producer
Grey Holiday	Glorious	2009	songwriter.
Mutemath	Armistice	2009	producer, engineer, mixer
Robbie Seay Band	Miracle	2010	songwriter, producer, engineer
KJ-52	Dangerous	2012	songwriter, producer, engineer, mixer
Stanfour	October Sky	2012	producer, engineer, re-mixer
For King & Country	Run Wild. Live Free. Love Strong.	2014	songwriter, producer, engineer
For King & Country	Priceless	2015	songwriter, producer, engineer
We Are Messengers	Honest	2019	songwriter, producer, engineer
