= Alisa Childers =

American singer (born 1975)

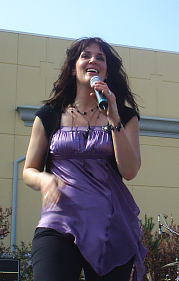
- Childers performing as part of ZOEgirl in 2005

Background information
- Born: Alisa Noelle Girard; April 17, 1975 (age 51)
- Origin: Pacoima, California, U.S.
- Genres: Rock, indie, pop, CCM
- Occupations: Singer, songwriter, worship leader
- Years active: 1999–present
- Formerly of: ZOEgirl
- Website: alisachilders.com

Alisa Childers (born Alisa Noelle Girard; April 17, 1975) is an American author, podcaster and singer. She was a member of the all-female Christian music group ZOEgirl.

== Early life ==
Born Alisa Noelle Girard to Karen and Christian music pioneer, Chuck Girard of Love Song, Childers grew up in San Fernando Valley, California. She studied gymnastics and piano at a young age. At the age of 21, she moved to New York and ran a youth center in southeast Manhattan.

== Music career ==
Childers left New York and moved back to California, where she was contacted by a family friend about starting a group upon return. Childers agreed to pursue the idea and was introduced to Kristin Swinford-Schweain and the two began composing songs. A few months later, Chrissy Conway-Katina joined the group. In 1999, ZOEgirl was signed to Sparrow Records. While with ZOEgirl, Childers wrote the singles "I Believe", "One Day", "Unchangeable", and "Scream".

ZOEgirl stayed together for seven years. Their split was amicable. At the end of 2006, Childers started a solo career.

== Writing ==
Childers has authored three books. Her first, Another Gospel (Tyndale, 2020, ISBN 978-1-49644173-7) recounts her experience with progressive Christianity and deconstruction. In it she describes having attended what was portrayed as a Bible study, her conclusion that it was an attempt to destroy her faith, and her journey back to that faith. Her second, Live Your Truth and Other Lies (Tyndale, 2022, ISBN 978-1-49645566-6) continues in the same vein as her prior book, countering common phrases heard in the secular world.

In January 2024, Childers released her third book, co-authored with Stand to Reason apologist Tim Barnett: The Deconstruction of Christianity (Tyndale, 2024, ISBN 978-1-4964-7497-1). In this book they look at the recent increase of the deconstruction movement in the Church.

In speeches and on her podcast, Childers has been vocally pro-life and has condemned "transgenderism."

== Personal life ==
Childers is married to Mike Childers, who played drums for ZOEgirl. In 2008, the couple had their first child together, a daughter. Childers gave birth to a second child, a son, in 2011. She also has two stepchildren.
