= ZOEgirl =

American pop band

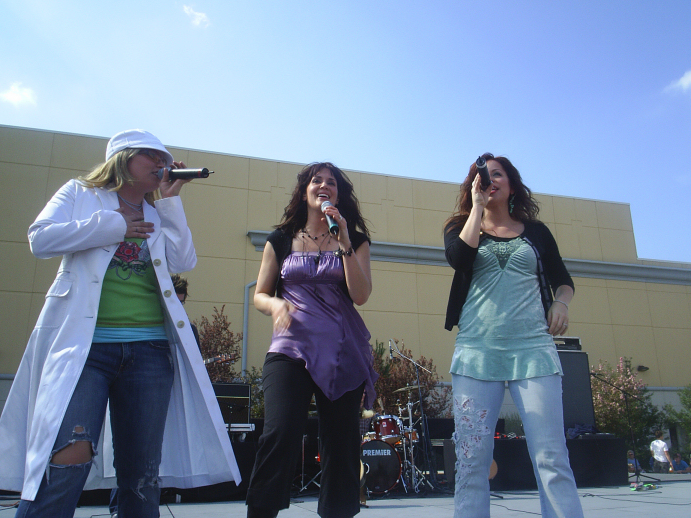
- ZOEgirl at the Jump5 tour in 2005. From left to right: Chrissy, Alisa, and Kristin.

Background information
- Origin: Brentwood, Tennessee, U.S.
- Genres: CCM; teen pop; pop rock; R&B; Gospel
- Years active: 1999–2006; 2011 (reunion); 2026–present
- Label: Sparrow
- Past members: Chrissy Conway-Katina; Alisa Childers; Kristin Swinford-Schweain

ZOEgirl is an American Christian pop girl group formed in 1999. The group comprised Chrissy Conway-Katina, Alisa Childers and Kristin Swinford-Schweain. They were signed to Sparrow Records from 1999 to 2006 and released their debut single "I Believe" in 2000. This song and their self-titled debut album ZOEgirl helped them become Sparrow's fastest selling artist of all time. With All of My Heart, the lead single for Life, was the group's only No. 1 Christian contemporary hit radio (CHR) single and led to the group receiving a GMA Dove Award for New Artist of the Year in 2002. By the end of 2003, over one million albums from ZOEgirl were sold.

As a response to the musical trends of the time, ZOEgirl changed their format from teen pop to pop rock with the release of "You Get Me" in 2003. Released as the lead single for their third album, Different Kind of Free, this was their only No. 1 Christian adult contemporary (AC) single. It also peaked at No. 2 on CHR, making it the second-highest ZOEgirl song on that chart. The group's musical change and the growing digital piracy at the time led to slower sales of ZOEgirl's music. Their highly anticipated fourth and final studio album Room to Breathe earned the No. 1 spot on Billboard's Top Heatseekers Album charts. It was ZOEgirl's least successful album in terms of US Christian radio airplay, with only "About You" and "Scream" released as singles and the latter being unsuccessful.

In 2006, ZOEgirl disbanded, and Kristin and Chrissy formed the group Colman Blue with Kelly Trontell, which split up in January 2010.

In 2011, the group reunited for a two-hour interview on The Brian Mason Show, suggesting that they may release a lullaby album in the future. On May 24, 2013, Chrissy registered the ZOEgirlMusic.com domain name with Go Daddy. The group confirmed that they have reunited to create the lullaby album, though nothing has materialized.

== History ==
=== 1999: Making the group ===
Norman Miller, an artist manager for groups such as Avalon, said one day: "I see a need for a girls pop group." He knew Alisa Childers since 1977, when she was two years old, and "decided to build the [girl] group around her." Together with Lynn Nichols, a writer and executive producer, they approached Kristin (Swinford) Schweain, who was then part of a jazz group. Nichols said: "She [Alisa] had a real writing sensitivity. Then we heard Kristin sing and play the piano. She had a pure pop voice, and it was a really interesting mix with Alisa's more gritty style. Then we said, 'Let's just see what unfolds.'" Schweain felt that it was a difficult decision for her to choose between her jazz group and this new opportunity in a girl group: "I felt like I was betraying them [her previous group], but at the same time I felt a pull to ZOEgirl and felt led to meet Alisa." She ultimately decided to join the group.

They wanted a third member, so Kristin remembered that her friend had "a friend in Atlanta who was playing in a band and working with some musicians." Nichols recalls: "It sounded kind of flaky, but I told Kristin to give her a call." This girl from Atlanta was Chrissy (Conway) Katina, who was recently rejected by LaFace Records. Katina said: "My lawyer thought I was crazy for wanting to join a Christian group. He told me I'd never make any money." Regardless, she chose to become the third member of the group, which has yet to be named.

=== 2000–2002: Pop years and "With All of My Heart" ===
This graphic, found on early versions of ZOEgirl's website, explains the band name's meaning.

The girl group signed to Sparrow Records but needed a name. Their original name was simply "ZOE", all in capital letters, their favourite from a list of possible names they have made. However, there was already a trademark for this name, so they added the suffix "girl" in minuscule letters to form the name "ZOEgirl." The name ZOEgirl comes from the Greek word zoe, which, in Greek, means life. Through their music, ZOEgirl talks about life in Christ.

ZOEgirl's first, self-titled release was released on August 15, 2000. Most of the songs talk about their relationship with God, although two of them are about fleeing a sinful lifestyle and were not released as singles. "I Believe" and "Living For You" both obtained the No. 4 position on the Adult Contemporary (AC) chart, while "Anything Is Possible" obtained the No. 8 position on the contemporary hit radio (CHR) chart. The album itself peaked at position No. 8 on Billboard's Top Heatseekers chart and sold over 350 000 copies by the end of 2003.

The single "With All of My Heart" was released on October 8, 2001, to promote the group's album, Life. The song obtained the No. 1 position for 3 weeks on the CHR Charts, and the No. 3 position on the AC radio charts. Life was released on November 20, 2001, with better critical acclaim and sales compared to their debut album. Over 120 000 copies of this album were sold during the first six weeks of its release, and nearly 370 000 copies were sold by the end of 2003.

=== 2003–2005: Transition to pop rock and "You Get Me" ===
After a drastic musical change from bubblegum pop to pop rock, Different Kind of FREE was released. This is the most critically acclaimed album from ZOEgirl, mainly due to its lead single "You Get Me" and the Radio Disney single "Feel Alright". Another factor leading to this album's success is the music video filmed for "You Get Me". The girls then embarked on the FREE Experience Tour to promote the album with artists Superchick and Joy Williams.

ZOEgirl released their final album with Sparrow, Room to Breathe, on March 15, 2005. The album peaked at position 108 on the Billboard 200, and at position No. 1 on the Billboard Heatseekers chart, making this the highest charting ZOEgirl album to date. However, its two singles were not as successful as the group's past hits. "About You" peaked at position No. 5 on the CHR charts and at No. 4 on the AC chart. "Scream" peaked at No. 40 on the AC charts and at No. 14 on the CHR charts.

The group's first greatest hits album, With All of My Heart – The Greatest Hits, was released on December 26, 2005. Two new songs were added to the album: "Unchangeable" and "One Day". "Unchangeable" was released as the album's lead single, peaking at No. 20 on CHR and No. 27 on AC. "One Day" was not released as a single.

=== 2006 - present ===
In September 2006, by means of their now-defunct ZOEgirl fan club site, the group announced that they would quit writing and recording music as a group so that members could tend to their personal objectives.

- Chrissy Conway-Katina laid down tracks for the solo album, Beautiful Redemption, which was never released. In 2008, she formed the group, COLMANblue, with Kelli Trontel and Kristin Swinford-Schweain. They recorded and released the song "Hey (Not Worth the Worry)" in 2009.
- Alisa Childers released a self-titled album on December 1, 2007. She was also in the Christian group named Girard Girls with her sisters and nieces. Formed in late 2009, they released a self-titled album independently under Calvary Chapel Music on April 20, 2011. In 2020, she was featured in the film American Gospel: Christ Crucified and detailed her journey from the Contemporary Christian Music movement to Christian Apologetics and a distinction between progressive and conservative Christianity.
- Kristin Swinford-Schweain recorded the album Days of Eden in 2008.

The members of ZOEgirl reunited on February 27, 2011 for an interview on The Brian Mason Show on which the group stated they had no specific plans to create additional music together.

In 2025, to celebrate the group's 25th anniversary, they teased via Facebook that "something special" would be coming. On November 3, 2026, they released the single "I Still Believe".

== Member timeline ==
Note: ZOEgirl disbanded in September 2006. September 2008 to March 2010 represents spin-off group COLMANblue.

== Discography ==
- ZOEgirl (2000)
- Life (2001)
- Different Kind of Free (2003)
- Room to Breathe (2005)

Awards
Preceded by Plus One	GMA's New Artist of the Year; 2002	Succeeded by Paul Colman Trio
