= Rebecca St. James discography =

- Studio albums: 10
- Extended plays: 5
- Live albums: 2
- Compilation albums: 9
- Singles: 62
- Video albums: 4
- Music videos: 14

The discography of Rebecca St. James, a contemporary Christian musician, consists of ten studio albums, two live albums, five extended plays, and nine compilation albums.

== Studio albums ==
Year	Album details	Peak chart positions				Certifications
Year	Album details	US	US Christ.	US Heat.	US Holiday	Certifications
1991	Refresh My Heart: Released: 1991; Label: DTS Music	—	—	—	—	
1994	Rebecca St. James: Released: January 24, 1994; Label: ForeFront Records	—	33	—	—	
1996	God: Released: June 25, 1996; Label: ForeFront Records	200	6	10	—	RIAA: Gold
1997	Christmas: Released: October 7, 1997; Label: ForeFront Records	—	14	12	30	
1998	Pray: Released: October 20, 1998; Label: ForeFront Records	168	5	5	—	RIAA: Gold
2000	Transform: Released: October 24, 2000; Label: ForeFront Records	166	14	7	—	
2002	Worship God: Released: February 26, 2002; Label: ForeFront Records	94	5	—	—	
2005	If I Had One Chance to Tell You Something: Released: November 22, 2005; Label: ForeFront Records	—	14	—	—	
2011	I Will Praise You: Released: April 5, 2011; Label: Beach Street Records/Reunion Records/Essential Records	153	9	—	—	
2022	Kingdom Come: Released: March 25, 2022; Label: Heritage Music Group	—	—	—	—	
"—" denotes a recording that did not chart.

== Live albums ==
Year	Album details	Peak chart positions		
Year	Album details	US	US Christ.	US Heat.
2004	Live Worship: Blessed Be Your Name: Released: February 24, 2004; Label: ForeFront Records	187	12	—
2007	aLIVE in Florida: Released: March 20, 2007; Label: ForeFront Records	—	43	—

== Extended plays ==
Year	Album details	Peak chart positions		
Year	Album details	US	US Christ.	US Heat.
1995	Extended Play Remixes: Released: July 20, 1995; Label: ForeFront Records	—	—	—
2006	America - The EP: Released: May 2, 2006; Label: ForeFront Records	—	—	—
2006	Top 5 Hits: Released: December 5, 2006; Label: ForeFront Records	—	—	—
2007	Holiday Trio: Released: November 20, 2007; Label: ForeFront Records	—	—	—
2020	Dawn: Released: July 24, 2020; Label: Heritage Music Group	—	—	—

== Compilation albums ==
Year	Album details	Peak chart positions		
Year	Album details	US	Billboard Christian Albums	Heat.
2003	Wait for Me: The Best from Rebecca St. James: Released: March 25, 2003; Label: ForeFront Records	—	16	—
2004	The Best of Rebecca St. James: Released: August 10, 2004; Label: ForeFront Records	—	—	—
2004	8 Great Hits: Released: November 16, 2004; Label: ForeFront Records	—	—	—
2004	Gold: Released: December 2004; Label: ForeFront Records	—	—	—
2006	The Early Years: Released: August 15, 2006; Label: ForeFront Records	—	—	—
2008	The Ultimate Collection: Released: March 11, 2008; Label: ForeFront Records	—	—	—
2008	Greatest Hits: Released: October 28, 2008; Label: ForeFront Records	—	—	—
2011	Back 2 Back Hits: Released: April 26, 2011; Label: ForeFront Records	—	—	—
2014	Icon (also known as Best of Rebecca St. James): Released: January 7, 2014; Label: ForeFront Records	—	—	—

== DVDs & Videos ==
Year	Video	VHS/DVD
1999	No Secrets	VHS
2002	Worship God	DVD
2005	If I Had One Chance to Tell You Something Special Edition DVD	DVD
2007	aLIVE in Florida	DVD

== Singles ==
=== Billboard singles ===
Year	Title	Chart positions				Album
Year	Title	US Christ. Songs	US Christ. Airplay	US Christ. AC	US Christ. Digital	Album
2002	"God of Wonders"	21		19	—	Worship God
2002	"Let My Words Be Few"	37		35	—	Worship God
2003	"I Thank You"	2		2	—	Wait for Me: The Best from Rebecca St. James
2003	"Expressions of Your Love" (with Chris Tomlin)	32		32	—	Wait for Me: The Best from Rebecca St. James
2004	"The Power of Your Love"	27		28	—	Live Worship: Blessed Be Your Name
2005	"Alive"	13		17	—	If I Had One Chance to Tell You Something
2005	"Hark the Herald Angels Sing"	—		40	—	WOW Christmas: Green
2011	"Shine Your Glory Down"	—		30	—	I Will Praise You
2020	"Battle Is the Lord's" (featuring Brandon Lake)	48	34	—	24	Dawn and Kingdom Come
2021	"Kingdom Come" (featuring for KING & COUNTRY)	34	26	20	8	Kingdom Come

=== Radio and Digital singles ===
Year	Song	Album
1994	"Here I Am"	Rebecca St. James
1994	"Everything I Do"	Rebecca St. James
1994	"Side by Side"	Rebecca St. James
1994	"We Don't Need It"	Rebecca St. James
1996	"God"	God
1996	"Go And Sin No More"	God
1996	"Abba (Father)"	God
1996	"You're the Voice"	God
1996	"Me Without You"	God
1997	"Speak to Me"	God
1997	"O Holy Night"	Christmas
1997	"What Child Is This?"	Christmas
1997	"O Come All Ye Faithful"	Christmas
1997	"O Come Emmanuel"	Christmas
1997	"Silent Night"	Christmas
1997	"Sweet Little Jesus Boy"	Christmas
1998	"Carry Me High"	God
1998	"Omega"	Pray
1998	"Pray"	Pray
1998	"Mirror"	Pray
1998	"Peace"	Pray
1998	"Come Quickly Lord"	Pray
1998	"Love to Love You"	Pray
1998	"I'll Carry You"	Pray
1999	"Yes, I Believe in God"	Non-album single
2000	"Wait For Me"	Transform
2000	"Reborn"	Transform
2000	"Don't Worry"	Transform
2001	"For the Love of God"	Transform
2001	"In Me"	Transform
2001	"All Around Me"	Transform
2002	"Breathe"	Worship God
2002	"Let My Words Be Few"	Worship God
2002	"God of Wonders"	Worship God
2002	"Above All"	Worship God
2003	"Quiet You With My Love"	Worship God
2003	"Song of Love"	Worship God
2003	"It Is Well"	Worship God
2003	"I Thank You"	Wait for Me: The Best from Rebecca St. James
2003	"Expressions of Your Love"	Wait for Me: The Best from Rebecca St. James
2005	"The Power of Your Love"	Live Worship: Blessed Be Your Name
2005	"Alive"	If I Had One Chance to Tell You Something
2005	"Hark the Herald Angels Sing"	Non-album single
2005	"You Are Loved"	If I Had One Chance to Tell You Something
2006	"God Help Me"	If I Had One Chance to Tell You Something
2006	"Take All of Me"	If I Had One Chance to Tell You Something
2006	"I Need You"	If I Had One Chance to Tell You Something
2006	"Forgive Me"	If I Had One Chance to Tell You Something
2006	"I Can Trust You"	If I Had One Chance to Tell You Something
2006	"Lest I Forget"	If I Had One Chance to Tell You Something
2006	"Love Being Loved by You"	If I Had One Chance to Tell You Something
2006	"America"	America - The EP
2007	"Our Great God" (duet with Todd Agnew)	Better Questions
2011	"Shine Your Glory Down"	I Will Praise You
2011	"I Will Praise You"	I Will Praise You
2011	"Little One"	Non-album single
2020	"Battle Is the Lord's" (featuring Brandon Lake)	Dawn and Kingdom Come
2020	"Together (Acoustic Version)" (featuring for KING & COUNTRY and Cory Asbury)	Non-album single
2021	"Kingdom Come" (featuring for KING & COUNTRY)	Kingdom Come
2022	"Praise"	Kingdom Come
2024	"Crazy" (with for KING & COUNTRY)	Unsung Hero (The Inspired By Soundtrack)
2025	"You Make Everything Beautiful" (featuring Gemma Fink and Imogen Fink)	I Will Praise You

== Music videos ==
- "Side By Side" (1994)
- "God" (1996)
- "You're the Voice" (1996)
- "O Come All Ye Faithful" (1997)
- "Pray" (1998)
- "Reborn" (2000)
- "Wait For Me" (2001)
- "Song of Love" (2002)
- "I Thank You" (2003)
- "Expressions of Your Love" (2003)
- "Yes, I Believe In God" (2005)
- "God Help Me" (2007)
- "Forgive Me" (2007)
- "Kingdom Come" (2021)
