= The Ultimate Collection (Rebecca St. James album) =

Compilation album by Rebecca St. James
- Released: March 11, 2008
- Genre: Religious
- Length: 100:27
- Label: ForeFront

Rebecca St. James chronology
If I Had One Chance to Tell You Something (2005)	The Ultimate Collection (2008)	I Will Praise You (2011)

Professional ratings
Review scores
Source	Rating
AllMusic	4.5/5 stars
Jesus Freak Hideout	3.5/5 stars
Cross Rhythms	8/10 squares
The Phantom Toolbooth	4/5

The Ultimate Collection is the fifth compilation album by Rebecca St. James. It was released by ForeFront Records on March 11, 2008. This album is a 2-CD collection of 25 of her most popular songs.

== Critical reception ==
Jared Johnson begins his AllMusic review by saying, "Ultimate in every conceivable meaning of the word, this double-disc collection is generous in length and prolific in its impact."

Laura Sproull of Jesus Freak Hideout gives the album 3½ out of a possible 5 stars and writes, "Both of these discs demonstrate the stages of Rebecca's musical talent and vocal ability and how she has matured since the start of her journey as a young teen. The overall quality of this project is good, but may not be good enough for the dedicated fans who already own the majority of Rebecca's music. There are a few rare gems that make it into this mix, however, including "Lion" from the Narnia soundtrack"

Tony Cummings of Cross Rhythms gives the album an 8 out of a possible 10 and writes, "Rebecca's voice stands out in quality above others and it verges on spectacular. The album shows her as an inventive crafter of music and lyrics and provides some excellent arrangements of other artists' songs."

Michael Dalton of The Phantom Toolbooth gives the album 4 out of a possible 5 and writes, "Rebecca St. James has the heart of a disciple. It's reflected in God-centered lyrics and modern music with an edge. It's this combination of passion for God and artistic integrity that make her a continual favorite with fans. This 2-CD set provides a comprehensive collection of her best material."

== Track listing ==
Disc 1
No.	Title	Writer(s)	Original album	Length
1.	"God Help Me"	Rebecca St. James	If I Had One Chance to Tell You Something (2005)	3:09
2.	"Reborn"	Rebecca St. James; Matt Bronleewe	Transform (2000)	3:57
3.	"God"	Rebecca St. James; Tedd Tjornhom	God (1996)	4:07
4.	"Lion"	Rebecca St. James; Jamie Moore; Cary Barlowe; Shaun Shankel	Music Inspired by The Chronicles of Narnia: The Lion, the Witch and the Wardrobe (2005)	3:45
5.	"Yes, I Believe In God"	Rebecca St. James; Janet Folger	non-album single	3:35
6.	"Go And Sin No More"	Rebecca St. James; Tedd Tjornhom; Michael Anderson	God	4:30
7.	"I Thank You"	Rebecca St. James; Linda Elias; Steve Hindalong; Marc Byrd	Wait for Me: The Best from Rebecca St. James	3:44
8.	"Better Is One Day"	Matt Redman	Worship God (2002)	4:21
9.	"Wait For Me"	Rebecca St. James	Transform	4:38
10.	"Hark! The Herald Angels Sing"	Traditional	Unexpected Gifts (2006)	4:18
11.	"A Cradle Prayer"	Rebecca St. James; Charles Garrett	Christmas (1997)	3:24
12.	"God Of Wonders"	Steve Hindalong; Marc Byrd	Worship God	4:11
13.	"Abba Father"	Rebecca St. James; Tedd Tjornhom; Otto Price	God	5:19
Total length:				52:58

Disc 2
No.	Title	Writer(s)	Original album	Length
1.	"You Are Loved"	Rebecca St. James	If I Had One Chance to Tell You Something	4:36
2.	"Alive"	Rebecca St. James; Matt Bronleewe	If I Had One Chance to Tell You Something	3:18
3.	"Psalm 139"	Rebecca St. James	God	3:21
4.	"Here I Am"	Rebecca St. James; Eric Champion; Bill Deaton	Rebecca St. James (1994)	3:46
5.	"Blessed Be Your Name"	Matt Redman; Beth Redman	aLIVE in Florida	4:31
6.	"Breathe"	Marie Barnett	Worship God	3:53
7.	"Mirror"	Rebecca St. James; Tedd Tjornhom	Pray (1998)	4:33
8.	"Pray"	Rebecca St. James; Tedd Tjornhom; Michael Quinlan	Pray	4:26
9.	"America"	Rebecca St. James; Phil Laeger; Tedd Tjornhom	non-album single	4:10
10.	"Expressions of Your Love" (duet with Chris Tomlin)	Rebecca St. James; Matt Bronleewe; Chris Tomlin; Jesse Reeves	Wait for Me: The Best from Rebecca St. James	4:00
11.	"Song of Love"	Rebecca St. James; Matt Bronleewe; Jeremy Ash	Worship God	4:05
12.	"Here I Am to Worship"	Tim Hughes	Live Worship: Blessed Be Your Name (2004)	2:50
Total length:				47:29

== Production ==
- Mastered by Vinnie Alibrandi
- Creative Design by Jan Cook
- Design by Andy Norris Design

Track information and credits verified from the album's liner notes.
