= Wait for Me =

Wait for Me may refer to:

== Albums ==
- Wait for Me (Moby album), 2009
- Wait for Me (The Pigeon Detectives album), 2007
- Wait for Me (Susan Tedeschi album), 2002
- Wait for Me: The Best from Rebecca St. James, a 2003 album

== Songs ==
- "Wait for Me" (Hall & Oates song), 1979
- "Wait for Me" (Kings of Leon song), 2013
- "Wait for Me" (Rebecca St. James song), 2000
  - "Wait for Me"/"Song of Love", a 2003 single by Rebecca St. James
- "Wait for Me" (Rise Against song), 2012
- "Wait for Me", a song by Anaïs Mitchell featured in the musical Hadestown
- "Wait for Me", a song by Big Sean from the 2011 album Finally Famous
- "Wait for Me", by Mutha's Day Out from My Soul Is Wet (1993)
- "Wait for Me", a song by Rhonda Franklin and The Teardops, 1964
- "Wait for Me", a song by Theory of a Deadman from the 2008 album Scars & Souvenirs
- "Wait for Me", a song from the official Blade Runner soundtrack

== Other ==
- Wait for Me (unproduced film), an unmade film project by Peter Bogdanovich
- Wait for Me (poem), a 1941 poem by Konstantin Simonov
- Wait for Me: Rediscovering the Joy of Purity in Romance, a 2002 book by Rebecca St. James
- Wait for Me!... Memoirs of the Youngest Mitford Sister, a 2010 autobiography of Deborah Cavendish
- Wait for Me (aka Espérame), a 1933 musical drama by director Louis J. Gasnier
- Wait for Me (1943 film), a Soviet war drama
- Wait for Me (2022 film), an Israeli drama film
- Wait for Me (2023 film), a United Kingdom-Irish co-production film
- Wait for Me (TV program), a Russian telecast
