= Free at Last: Extended Play Remixes =

Remix album by dc Talk
- Released: 1994
- Recorded: 1994
- Genre: Christian rock
- Length: 22:02
- Label: ForeFront
- Producer: Scott Blackwell (tracks 1–2), The Gotee Brothers (3), Toby McKeehan/Mark Heimermann (4)

Dc Talk chronology
Free at Last: Extended Play Remixes	Limited Edition EP (Freak Show Bonus Disc)

The Free at Last – Extended Play Remixes is a remix EP by Christian rap/rock/pop trio dc Talk. The EP was released in the summer of 1994 on the heels of the Grammy Award-winning and platinum-selling album Free at Last. The album's three main hits were remixed for this release. The "Extended Play Remixes" was a three-part series released by ForeFront Records in 1994 with the other two by Audio Adrenaline and Code of Ethics. The series extended into the next year with releases by Geoff Moore and the Distance and Rebecca St. James.

Professional ratings
Review scores
Source	Rating
Jesus Freak Hideout	2.5/5 stars

== Track listing ==
1. "Jesus Is Just Alright (Techno Mix)" – 5:28
2. "Jesus Is Just Alright (Retro Mix)" – 6:36
3. "Luv Is a Verb (Gotee Mix)" – 4:32
4. "The Hardway (Video Mix)" – 5:28

== Track by track notes ==
"Jesus Is Just Alright"

See the main article for Jesus Is Just Alright (Doobie Brothers version) and Jesus Is Just Alright (dc Talk version) The "Techno Mix" arranges the song to a techno beat as the title implies. The "Retro Mix" adds a disco flavor. Each of these versions was remixed by Scott Blackwell for this release.

"Luv Is a Verb"

"Luv Is a Verb" was remixed by The Gotee Brothers and was given a strong percussion-based treatment. The Gotee Brothers was composed of Toby McKeehan, Todd Collins, and Joey Elwood. This partnership eventually became Gotee Records, which represents major artists such as GRITS, Relient K, and Family Force 5.

"The Hardway"

For the music video, dc Talk opted to use a slightly different mix for "The Hardway" than the version originally featured on Free At Last. This was the first official release of the version used in the video. This version was also included on Intermission: the Greatest Hits in 2000.

== Chart position ==
Christian albums are tracked on Billboard's Top Contemporary Christian album chart. The Top 40 albums were tracked bi-weekly at the time of this release, although it now a weekly tracking. Free at Last: Extended Play Remixes opened at No. 36 on the chart tracking the two weeks of August 20, 1994. It left the Top 40 for the next two weeks, but returned to its peak position at No. 35 on September 17. After charting at No. 37 on October 1, it did not chart again.

== Album credits ==
- Executive producers – Dan R. Brock and Eddie DeGarmo
- Mastered by Ken Love at Mastermix in Nashville, TN
- Disc photography by John Falls
- Cover design and stills by Nucleus

== See also ==
- Extended Play Remixes, for other EPs in the series
