= Alive (Rebecca St. James song) =

Single by Rebecca St. James

from the album If I Had One Chance to Tell You Something
- Released: 4 October 2005
- Recorded: 2005
- Genre: CCM, pop rock
- Length: 3:24
- Label: ForeFront
- Songwriters: Rebecca St. James, Matt Bronleewe
- Producer: Matt Bronleewe

Rebecca St. James singles chronology
"Wait for Me/Song of Love" (2003)	"Alive" (2005)	"Hark the Herald Angels Sing" (2005)

"Alive" is a single from Christian pop and rock artist Rebecca St. James. A pop song with rock elements, "Alive" was released as the lead single from her album If I Had One Chance to Tell You Something on 4 October 2005.

== Background ==
The song was written by Rebecca St. James and Matt Bronleewe. The song is about letting go of selfish ways and coming alive in Christ. Rebecca commented on the song saying, "I love that this song is the first single from the album because it really represents where I am in my life right now. I feel over the last few years that God has really refreshed my soul."

== Critical reception ==
Jesus Freak Hideout favored the song saying it was "a plentiful solid moment on the album". Rob Theakston of the All Music Guide said, "The driving sound of "Alive"... brings to mind tonal qualities normally found in Linkin Park or Coheed & Cambria, but only if they were filtered through having tea with the Cranberries with lyrics emerging from a wholly Christian perspective."

== Live performances ==
Rebecca performed the song as the finale of her If I Had One Chance to Tell You Something Tour. A live version of the song with an accompanying video were featured on her live album aLIVE in Florida.

== Chart performance ==
For the week ending 10 December 2005, "Alive" peaked at No. 13 on Billboard's Hot Christian Songs chart. It stayed on the chart for 17 weeks.

== Other appearances ==
"Alive" has been featured on Rebecca St. James' 2008 compilation The Ultimate Collection. It was also included on WOW Hits 2007.
