= Transform (Rebecca St. James album) =

Studio album by Rebecca St. James
- Released: 24 October 2000
- Studios: Charlie Peacock Studios, Emerald Entertainment, Ivy Park and Ocean Way Nashville (Nashville, Tennessee); Antenna Studios, The Indigo Room and Bridgeway Studios (Franklin, Tennessee); AIR Studios and SpaceTime Studios (London, UK)
- Genre: CCM
- Length: 53:00
- Label: ForeFront
- Producers: Matt Bronleewe; Tedd T; Dann Huff; Pete Kipley

Rebecca St. James chronology
Pray (1998)	Transform (2000)	Worship God (2002)

Singles from Transform
- 1. "Reborn" Released: 2000; 2. "Wait For Me" Released: 2000

Transform is the sixth studio album by Christian pop and rock singer Rebecca St. James. It was released on 24 October 2000 and debuted at No. 166 on the Billboard 200. The album spawned two singles, "Wait for Me" and "Reborn".

== Background ==
=== Writing and development ===
Like her previous albums, Rebecca co-wrote the majority of the album, with the exception of "One" and "In Me". "For the Love of God" was written after Rebecca attended a missions trip to Romania, while the song "Reborn" was written about a friend coming to know Christ. Rebecca stated that "To see the joy and excitement in her new 'reborn' life is beautiful." Rebecca commented on the meaning of "Don't Worry" by saying "I am really quite a dramatic person and this song is a drama, a story, that challenges me to truly give things to God and not 'take them back' by worrying." "Merciful" was inspired by a book titled The Mitford Years, while "Universe" was penned after she took a walk by a creek next to her house, in which she was inspired of God's love.

The song "Wait for Me", a track about sexual purity, was solely written by St. James. It has become one of her staple songs, being featured on every compilation album released by the singer to date. Rebecca talked about the song, saying "The idea for this song came from letters that I have written to my future husband, that I will one day give to him. I sing it not just to him but on behalf of young women today, encouraging the future husbands of our generation to stay sexually pure, to wait for us." "Stand" was written in the Pontiac Silverdome, and "Lean On" was penned with the band Earthsuit. Rebecca described "My Hope" as "a worship song that points to Jesus as the Hope for us all."

The album was chiefly produced by Matt Bronleewe, who produced eight out of the thirteen tracks, including "Reborn", "Don't Worry", and "For the Love of God". Frequent Rebecca St. James collaborator Tedd T. produced the songs "Wait for Me" and "Universe". Other producers who worked on the album were Dann Huff and Pete Kipley. The album's strings were performed by The London Session Orchestra and The Love Sponge String Quartet. Rebecca described the process by saying, "Recording the strings with the London Session Orchestra... was a moving experience that I will never forget." A song called "Vision" that was featured on a pre-release of the album was taken off for unknown reasons. It is a very rare song and extremely hard to find.

=== Music structure and lyrics ===
Transform has a more electronic drive to the album. Songs such as "For the Love of God" and "Merciful" are rock-driven songs backed by string arrangements, while "Reborn" is a dance-groove track. "One", "Wait for Me", and "All Around Me" all offer different outlooks on the album as well, with funk, pop, and rock respectively. Lyrical content includes topics on salvation, worrying, unity, hope, and sexual purity.

== Release and reception ==
=== Critical reception ===
Professional ratings
Review scores
Source	Rating
Jesus Freak Hideout	3.5/5 stars
AllMusic	4.5/5 stars

Transform received generally positive reviews from critics. Jesus Freak Hideout gave the album 3.5 out of 5 stars, saying the album "marks yet another step and progression for Rebecca", while Christianity Today said "This is easily Rebecca's biggest, most dramatic, and most mature production to date." AllMusic also enjoyed the album saying "Transform has textured production, Top 40 resonance and inspiring lyrics".

=== Chart performance ===
Transform debuted and peaked at No. 166 on the Billboard 200 in October 2000. It also made appearances on the Christian Albums and Heatseekers charts at No. 14 and No. 7 respectively.

== Singles and popular songs ==
- Although never released as a physical single, "Reborn" was released to Christian radio in 2000. It was successful enough that it made an appearance on WOW Hits 2001, Christian music's biggest year-end compilation album.
- "Wait for Me" was released to Christian radio in 2001. It made an appearance on WOW Hits 2002. The song was released as a double A-side physical single with "Song of Love" (from Worship God) on 8 April 2003.
- "Don't Worry" was released as a Christian radio single in the UK and Australia. It charted on the Australia 2001 year-end charts at No. 17, the Australasian 2001 year-end chart at No. 5, and on the UK 2001 year-end charts at No. 36.
- "In Me" was released to Christian radio in Australia as well. It peaked at No. 27 on the year-end 2001 charts, and No. 9 on the year-end 2001 Australasian singles chart.
- "For the Love of God", and "All Around Me" were all released as singles to Christian radio in the UK and made the 2001 year-end list at No. 31, and No. 59 respectively.
- "Stand" was featured on Rebecca's first greatest hits compilation, Wait for Me: The Best from Rebecca St. James.

== Promotion ==
Rebecca embarked on a Transform Tour in 2001. "Reborn", "Don't Worry", "One", "Wait for Me", "Universe", "For the Love of God", and "Intro" were all featured in the set list. Songs such as "Wait for Me" and "Reborn" have also been performed in the Worship God Tour, the Adoration Tour, and the If I Had One Chance To Tell You Something Tour. Live versions of both songs can be found on Rebecca's 2007 live album, ALive in Florida.

== Track listing ==
1. "Intro" (Instrumental) – 0:52
2. "For the Love of God" (Matt Bronleewe, Rebecca St. James) – 4:37
3. "Reborn" (Bronleewe, St. James) – 3:59
4. "Don't Worry" (Bronleewe, St. James) – 3:37
5. "Merciful" (Bronleewe, St. James, Jeremy Bose, Paul Field) – 5:00
6. "One" (Regie Hamm, Dan Muckala) – 4:37
7. "Universe" (St. James, Joel Smallbone, Michael-Anthony Tyler) – 5:00
8. "Wait For Me" (St. James) – 4:40
9. "In Me" (Jess Cates, Chad Cates, Ricky Jackson, Randy Jackson) – 4:14
10. "Lean On" (St. James, Earthsuit) – 3:38
11. "All Around Me" (St. James, Paul Stewart, Brad Duncan) – 3:41
12. "Stand" (St. James, Hamm) – 4:36
13. "My Hope" (St. James, Field) – 4:29

== Personnel ==
- Rebecca St. James – vocals, backing vocals
- Matt Bronleewe – programming (1–5, 10–12), additional guitars (2, 4, 12)
- Tedd T – programming (6–9), arrangements (7, 8)
- Damon Riley – programming assistant (6, 9), additional programming (7, 8), arrangements (7, 8)
- Tim Akers – keyboards (6, 9)
- Pete Kipley – programming (13), guitars (13)
- Oran Thornton – guitars (2, 4, 5, 12), additional guitars (11)
- Gary Burnette – guitars (3)
- Dann Huff – guitars (6, 9)
- Jerry McPherson – guitars (6, 9)
- Bob Halligan – acoustic guitar (7, 8)
- Brent Milligan – electric guitars (7, 8), bass (7, 8), additional cello (7)
- Pete Stewart – guitars (11)
- Dave Larring – guitars (13)
- Otto Price – bass (2, 4, 5)
- Jackie Street – bass (6, 9)
- James Gregory – bass (11, 12)
- Dan Needham – drums (2, 4)
- Dale Baker – drums (5)
- Chris McHugh – drums (6, 9)
- Joe Porter – drums (11, 12)
- Dennis Holt – drums (13)
- Jeremy Bose – string arrangements (2, 5, 12), additional keyboards (7)
- The London Session Orchestra – strings (2, 5, 12)
- John Catchings – cello (3, 10), string arrangements (7, 8)
- The Love Sponge Strings – strings (7, 8)
- Jacob Lawson – strings (13)
- Tasia Tjornhom – backing vocals (7, 8)

== Production ==
- David Bach – executive producer
- Eddie DeGarmo – executive producer
- Steve Hartley – executive producer
- Matt Bronleewe – producer (1–5, 10–12)
- Dann Huff – producer (6, 9)
- Tedd T – producer (7, 8), mixing (7, 8)
- Pete Kipley – producer (13), recording (13)
- Skye McCaskey – recording (1–5, 10–12)
- Jeff Balding – recording (6, 9), mixing (6, 9)
- Jason Scherer – recording assistant (1–5, 10–12)
- Eric Bickel – recording assistant (6, 9), mix assistant (6, 9)
- Shane D. Wilson – mixing (2, 3, 5, 10, 11)
- J.R. McNeely – mixing (4, 12)
- Jeff Balding – mixing (6, 9)
- Paul "Salvo" Salveson – mixing (7, 8)
- Tom Laune – mixing (13)
- Chad Brown – mix assistant (4, 12)
- Shawn Simpson – digital editing (6, 9)
- Stephen Marcussen – mastering at Marcussen Mastering (Hollywood, California)
- Keyboard sample on "One" courtesy of Spectrasonics Distorted Reality 2
- Mike "Frog" Griffith – production coordinator (6, 9)
- Scott McDaniel – creative director
- Susannah Parrish – art direction
- Kristin Barlowe – photography
- Smallbone Management – management

== Charts ==
Chart performance for Transform
Chart (1998)	Peak position
US Billboard 200	166
US Top Christian Albums (Billboard)	14

Chart (2000)	Peak position
US Heatseekers Albums (Billboard)	7
