= Wait on Me (disambiguation) =

"Wait on Me" is a 2014 song by British band Rixton.

Wait on Me may also refer to:

- Wait on Me (EP), by Kai, and its title track
- "Wait on Me", song by Lil Twist with Khalil (singer)
- "Wait on Me", song by Raheem DeVaughn from Guru's Jazzmatazz, Vol. 4: The Hip Hop Jazz Messenger: Back to the Future

== See also ==
- Wait for Me (disambiguation)
