= Worship God =

Studio album by Rebecca St. James
- Released: 26 February 2002
- Studios: Pentavarit (Nashville, Tennessee)
- Genres: Gospel, CCM, worship
- Length: 44:42
- Label: ForeFront
- Producers: Matt Bronleewe; Tedd T

Rebecca St. James chronology
Transform (2000)	Worship God (2002)	Wait for Me: The Best from Rebecca St. James (2003)

Singles from Worship God
- 1. "Song of Love" Released: 2002; 2. "Breathe" Released: 2002; 3. "God of Wonders" Released: 2002; 4. "Let My Words Be Few" Released: 2002

Worship God is the seventh studio album by Rebecca St. James, released on 26 February 2002. It is her highest-charting album to date, peaking at No. 94 on the Billboard 200. The album produced the hit singles "Song of Love" and "Breathe".

== Writing and development ==
Unlike her prior albums, St. James only co-wrote four out of the eleven songs. Because of its worship genre, the other seven songs are standard worship cover songs. These songs are Matt Redman's "Let My Words Be Few" and "Better Is One Day", Marie Barnett's "Breathe", City on a Hill's "God of Wonders", Lenny LeBlanc and Paul Baloche's "Above All", Jeremy Casella's "More Than the Watchmen", and the hymn "It Is Well".

St. James says "Song of Love" was partly inspired by the lorikeets outside her grandparents' home in Australia. "Lamb of God" was written and vocally recorded in just an hour and a half. St. James says of the track, "My favorite moments in songwriting are when God miraculously drops a verse, or a chorus, or even a whole song into my lap. It was definitely that way with this song." The song "You" was written while St. James was on vacation in Australia. "It Is Well" was recorded on 11 September 2001. The album also includes a bonus remix of her 1998 song, "Omega".

The album was solely produced by Matt Bronleewe, except for the "Omega Remix", which was produced by Tedd T. The string arrangements for this album were done by Jeremy Bose.

== Music structure and lyrics ==
St. James describes the entire album as "passionate, edgy pop/rock". Lyrical content is mainly worship songs about God's love.

== Track listing ==
No.	Title	Writer(s)	Length
1.	"Let My Words Be Few" (Matt Redman cover)	Matt Redman, Beth Redman	4:53
2.	"Song of Love"	Jeremy Ash, Matt Bronleewe, Rebecca St. James	4:08
3.	"Breathe" (Marie Barnett cover)	Marie Barnett	3:57
4.	"God of Wonders" (City on a Hill cover)	Marc Byrd, Steve Hindalong	4:12
5.	"Lamb of God"	Ash, Bronleewe, St. James	3:07
6.	"Above All" (Paul Baloche cover)	Paul Baloche, Lenny LeBlanc	4:07
7.	"Better Is One Day" (Matt Redman cover)	M. Redman	4:23
8.	"Quiet You with My Love"	Bronleewe, St. James	4:06
9.	"More Than The Watchmen" (Jeremy Casella cover)	Jeremy Casella	3:02
10.	"It Is Well"	Horatio Spafford	4:08
11.	"You"	St. James	3:56
12.	"Omega" (Remix)	St. James, Tedd T	4:53

== Personnel ==
- Rebecca St. James – all vocals
- Matt Bronleewe – keyboards (1, 3, 4, 6, 7, 11), guitars (1, 2, 4, 5, 11), bass (1), drum programming (1, 4, 11), additional guitars (7), acoustic piano (10), Minimoog (10)
- Randall Waller – guitars (2, 3, 6–10)
- Justin York – guitars (8, 10)
- James Gregory – bass (2–10)
- Aaron Redfield – drums (2, 3, 5–10)
- John Catchings – cello (8–10)
- Jeremy Bose – string arrangements (1, 2, 11)

== Production ==
- Greg Ham – executive producer
- Steve Hartley – executive producer, A&R
- Matt Bronleewe – producer (1–11), mixing
- Tedd T. – producer (12)
- Skye McCaskey – engineer, mixing
- Shawn Andrews – digital editing
- Ken Love – mastering at MasterMix (Nashville, Tennessee)
- Susannah Parrish – creative coordinator
- Scott McDaniel – art direction
- Neal Ashby – design
- Kristin Barlowe – photography
- Debi Briscoe – hair color
- Smallbone Management – management

== Release and reception ==
Professional ratings
Review scores
Source	Rating
AllMusic	4.5/5 stars
Jesus Freak Hideout	(CD)
Jesus Freak Hideout	(DVD)

=== Critical reception ===
Both Jesusfreakhideout (JFH) and AllMusic gave the album 4.5 out of 5 stars. JFH says, "Rebecca St. James has outdone herself on Worship God. She has set a new standard for modern worship here. Miss out on this project and you may miss out on an incredible worship experience", while AllMusic wrote "Worship God is not just another album latching onto the [worship] genre's popularity. It is a reflection of Rebecca St. James' lifestyle of worship and one that will not quickly leave CD players."

=== Chart performance ===
The album is St. James's most successful to date. It is her only album to peak inside the top 100 on the Billboard 200, at No. 94. It also peaked at No. 5 on Billboard's Hot Christian Albums chart.

== Singles and popular songs ==
- "Song of Love" was released to Christian radio in 2002, as well as a physical double-A side single with "Wait for Me" (from Transform) on 8 April 2003. The song proved to be extremely successful in her home country of Australia, where it charted at No. 3 on Australian Christian radio's 2002 Year-End Charts, and No. 1 on the Australasian 2002 Year-End Charts. The song has also been featured on every Rebecca St. James compilation to date (except The Early Years), and was included on WOW Hits 2003.
- "Breathe" was released as the first radio single in the United States. It was well received and was featured on WOW Worship: Yellow, Wait for Me: The Best from Rebecca St. James, The Ultimate Collection, and GreatestHits. The song also fared well in Australia where it charted at No. 22 on their 2002 Year-End chart, and No. 5 on the Australasian 2002 Year-End chart.
- "God of Wonders" and "Let My Words Be Few" peaked at No. 19 and No. 35 respectively on Billboard's Hot Christian Songs chart. The former was also included on The Ultimate Collection. The latter was released as a single in Australia, where it peaked at No. 41 on their 2003 Year-End chart. It also charted at No. 16 on the Australasian 2003 Year-End chart.
- "Quiet You with My Love" was released as a single in the UK where it peaked at No. 12 on their 2003 Year-End Charts.

== Promotion ==
St. James embarked on a Worship God Tour in 2003. The set list consisted mainly of songs from Worship God, but also featured some earlier songs.

- Set List:
1. "Reborn"
2. "I Thank You"
3. "Song of Love"
4. "Go and Sin No More"
5. "Wait for Me"
6. "You"
7. "Quiet You with My Love"
8. "Let My Words Be Few"
9. "Lamb of God"
10. "Breathe"
11. "Above All"
12. "Awesome God"
13. "Yes, I Believe in God"
14. "God"
15. "Awesome God" (reprise)

Songs from Worship God have also been performed on her Adoration Tour, the If I Had One Chance To Tell You Something Tour, and the Worship Revolution Tour. An entire taped concert from the If I Had One Chance... Tour can be found on her 2007 CD/DVD release ALive in Florida.

== Charts ==
Chart performance for Worship God
Chart (2002)	Peak position
US Billboard 200	94
US Top Christian Albums (Billboard)	5

== Compilation contributions ==
Songs from Worship God have been released on many compilations over the years. Here is a complete list of songs from the album featured on other releases.

- WOW Hits 2003... "Song of Love"
- Dove Hits 2003... "Song of Love"
- Wow Worship: Yellow... "Breathe"
- Wait For Me: The Best From Rebecca St. James... "Song of Love", "Breathe" and "Lamb of God"
- Worship Together: Here I Am to Worship... "God of Wonders"
- Worship Together: Be Glorified... "Song of Love"
- Left Behind Worship: God Is With Us... "God of Wonders"
- Left Behind Tribulation Force Soundtrack: Contemporary Christian... "God of Wonders"
- The Best Worship Songs... Ever!... "Above All"
- Worship Together Platinum... "Breathe"
- Worship: The Ultimate Collection... "Above All" and "God of Wonders"
- Rebecca St. James: Top 5 Hits... "Breathe" and "God of Wonders"
- WOW Hymns... "It Is Well"
- The Ultimate Collection... "Song of Love", "Breathe", "God of Wonders" and "Better Is One Day"
- Songs That Changed the Church: CCM... "God of Wonders"
- Greatest Hits... "Song of Love", "Better Is One Day" and "Breathe"
- Worship For the Family: 35 Top Worship Songs... "God of Wonders"

== DVD ==
Also in 2002, St. James released her first DVD, Worship God. It featured music videos of "Wait For Me", "Song of Love", "Reborn", eight audio clips from Worship God, an interview, photos, a "My Australia" featurette and more.
