= WOW Hits 2002 =

Compilation album by various artists
- Released: October 23, 2001
- Genre: Contemporary Christian music
- Label: Sparrow
- Producer: Various

WOW Hits chronology
WOW Hits 2001 (2000)	WOW Hits 2002 (2001)	WOW Hits 2003 (2002)

Professional ratings
Review scores
Source	Rating
Christian Music Today	(?)
Jesus Freak Hideout	3/5 stars

WOW Hits 2002 is a compilation album of 30 contemporary Christian music hits plus three bonus cuts from the year 2001. It peaked at No. 52 on the Billboard 200 chart in 2001 and 2002 and also climbed to number two on the Top Contemporary Christian chart in both years. The album was certified as platinum in 2002 by the Recording Industry Association of America (RIAA).

== Track listing ==
Red disc
No.	Title	Writer(s)	Artist (Album)	Length
1.	"Joy"	Peter Furler, Steve Taylor	Newsboys (Shine: The Hits)	4:11
2.	"40 Days"	Mac Powell, Tai Anderson, Brad Avery, David Carr, Mark Lee	Third Day (Come Together)	3:03
3.	"Beautiful"	Tyler Burkum, Ben Cissell, Bob Herdman, Will McGinniss, Mark Stuart	Audio Adrenaline (Lift)	3:53
4.	"Dismissed"	Chrissy Conway, Alisa Girard, Lynn Nichols, Lynn Nichols, Kristin Schweain, Tedd T.	ZOEgirl (Life)	3:26
5.	"Somebody's Watching"	Toby McKeehan, Rockwell Michael-Anthony Taylor	tobyMac (Momentum)	3:36
6.	"Breathe on Me"	Jennifer Knapp	Jennifer Knapp (The Way I Am)	3:30
7.	"Genuine"	Stacie Orrico, Tedd T., B. Huston	Stacie Orrico (Genuine)	5:00
8.	"Different Now"	Lisa Kimmey, Lee Jerkins	Out of Eden (This Is Your Life)	3:30
9.	"Existence"	Kevin Max, Mark Townsend	Kevin Max (Stereotype Be)	4:14
10.	"Witness"	Nicole C. Mullen, David Cox, Linda Kowatch	Nicole C. Mullen (Talk About It)	3:34
11.	"Spinnin' Around"	Mark Hammond, Grant Cunningham, Stephanie Lewis	Jump5 (Jump5)	3:39
12.	"All You Got"	Michael Tait, Chad Chapin, Toby McKeehan	Tait (Empty)	4:38
13.	"Jump, Jump, Jump"	Joe Priolo, Errol Johnson	True Vibe (True Vibe)	3:03
14.	"Serious"	Chuck Butler, Sue C. Smith, Dan Muckala	Joy Williams (Joy Williams)	3:53
15.	"With Every Breath" (featuring Dan Haseltine of Jars of Clay & Leigh Nash of Sixpence None the Richer)	Marc Byrd	City on a Hill (City on a Hill: Songs of Worship and Praise)	5:03
16.	"Hey, Hey" (Bonus track)	Owen Thomas, Brent Milligan	The Elms (The Big Surprise)	3:08

Gold disc
No.	Title	Writer(s)	Artist (Album)	Length
1.	"Begin With Me"	Steve Siler, David Tyson	Point of Grace (Free to Fly)	3:16
2.	"This Day"	Steven Curtis Chapman	Steven Curtis Chapman (Declaration)	4:37
3.	"Wonder Why"	Grant Cunningham, Matt Huesmann	Avalon (Oxygen)	4:00
4.	"Back In His Arms Again"	Mark Schultz	Mark Schultz (Song Cinema)	4:23
5.	"God Is In This Place"	Phil Sillas, Stephanie Lewis	Plus One (The Promise)	3:41
6.	"Breathe" (Live)	Marie Barnett	Michael W. Smith (Worship)	5:45
7.	"Wait For Me"	Rebecca St. James	Rebecca St. James (Transform)	4:30
8.	"Watching Over Me"	Jeromy Deibler	FFH (Have I Ever Told You)	3:05
9.	"You Lift Me Up"	Chris Eaton, Cindy Morgan	Rachael Lampa (Live for You)	3:38
10.	"You'll Never Thirst"	Da'dra Crawford-Greathouse, Nicole C. Mullen, Brad O'Donnell, Roger Ryan	Anointed (If We Pray)	4:32
11.	"Adore"	Brent Bourgeois, Chris Eaton	Jaci Velasquez (Crystal Clear)	4:12
12.	"We Delight"	Joshua Moore	Caedmon's Call (In the Company of Angels)	3:25
13.	"Psalm 112"	Mark Harris, Tony Wood	4Him (Walk On)	4:49
14.	"Welcome Home"	Shaun Groves	Shaun Groves (Invitation to Eavesdrop)	4:06
15.	"Cover Me"	Bebo Norman	Bebo Norman (Big Blue Sky)	4:39
16.	"Isn't It Love" (Bonus track)	Andrew Peterson	Andrew Peterson (Clear to Venus)	3:19
17.	"Protest to Praise" (Bonus track)	Jason Germain, Marc Martel	Downhere (Downhere)	5:06

== Certifications ==
Region	Certification	Certified units/sales
United States (RIAA)	Platinum	1,000,000^{^}
^{^} Shipments figures based on certification alone.
