= The Word In Praise =

American Christian music radio format

The Word In Praise is a radio format programmed and produced in the US by Salem Radio Networks. It targets the 35- to 54-year-old Christian listener demographic. This radio format has a blend of soft Christian contemporary music from artists such as Amy Grant, Steven Curtis Chapman, MercyMe, Michael W. Smith and Rebecca St. James. The Word In Praise has become a main staple of churches, mainly for worship anthems.

It is also used on teaching and talk radio stations.
