= Wait for Me: The Best from Rebecca St. James =

Greatest hits album by Rebecca St. James
- Released: 25 March 2003
- Genre: CCM
- Length: 73:18
- Label: ForeFront
- Producers: Matt Bronleewe; Tedd T; Bill Deaton; John Hartley

Rebecca St. James chronology
Worship God (2002)	Wait for Me: The Best from Rebecca St. James (2003)	If I Had One Chance to Tell You Something (2005)

Professional ratings
Review scores
Source	Rating
AllMusic	3/5 stars
Jesus Freak Hideout	3.5/5 stars

Wait for Me: The Best from Rebecca St. James is the first compilation album by Christian pop and rock artist Rebecca St. James.

== Track listing ==
No.	Title	Writer(s)	Original album	Length
1.	"Expressions of Your Love" (duet with Chris Tomlin)	Rebecca St. James; Matt Bronleewe; Chris Tomlin; Jesse Reeves	New song	4:02
2.	"Wait for Me"	Rebecca St. James	Transform (2000)	4:40
3.	"I Thank You"	Rebecca St. James; Linda Elias; Steve Hindalong; Marc Byrd	New song	3:45
4.	"God"	Rebecca St. James; Tedd Andrew Tjornhom	God (1996)	4:08
5.	"Lamb of God"	Rebecca St. James; Matt Bronleewe; Jeremy Ash	Worship God (2002)	3:09
6.	"Go and Sin No More"	Rebecca St. James; Tedd Andrew Tjornhom; Michael Anderson	God	4:33
7.	"A Cradle Prayer"	Rebecca St. James; Charles Garrett	Christmas (1997)	3:27
8.	"Pray"	Rebecca St. James; Tedd Andrew Tjornhom; Michael Quinlan	Pray (1998)	4:29
9.	"Mirror"	Rebecca St. James; Tedd Andrew Tjornhom	Pray	4:36
10.	"Yes, I Believe in God"	Rebecca St. James; Janet Folger	Radio Single (1999)	3:39
11.	"Here I Am"	Rebecca St. James; Bill Deaton; Eric Champion	Rebecca St. James (1994)	3:50
12.	"Stand"	Rebecca St. James; Regie Hamm	Transform	4:36
13.	"Reborn"	Rebecca St. James; Matt Bronleewe	Transform	3:58
14.	"Speak to Me"	Rebecca St. James; Josh Deaton; Tedd Andrew Tjornhom	God	4:48
15.	"Breathe"	Marie Barnett	Worship God	3:57
16.	"Song of Love"	Rebecca St. James; Matt Bronleewe; Jeremy Bose	Worship God	4:10
17.	"Until Your Love Broke Through"	Keith Green; Randy Stonehill; Todd Fishkind	Your Love Broke Through: The Worship Songs of Keith Green (2002)	4:06
18.	"Psalm 139"	Rebecca St. James	God	3:25
Total length:				73:18

== Personnel ==
Tracks 1 & 3

- Rebecca St. James – vocals (1), all vocals (3)
- Matt Bronleewe – programming, all other instruments
- Jackie Street – bass guitar
- Chris Tomlin – vocals (1)

Track 17

- Rebecca St. James – lead vocals
- Jamie Kenney – keyboards
- Charlie Peacock – keyboards
- Phil Madeira – Hammond B3 organ
- John Mark Painter – toy piano, brass
- Pete Kipley – programming
- Gary Burnette – guitars
- Derri Daugherty – guitars
- Phil Keaggy – guitars
- Chris Donahue – bass
- Dennis Holt – drums
- Ken Lewis – percussion
- Jim Hoke – harmonica
- Christine Byrd – backing vocals
- Lisa Cochran – backing vocals
- Fleming McWilliams – backing vocals
- Chris Rodriguez – backing vocals
- Felicia Sorensen – backing vocals

== Production ==
- Greg Ham – executive producer
- Steve Hartley – executive producer, A&R
- Matt Bronleewe – producer (1, 3, 5, 10, 12, 13, 15, 16)
- Tedd T – producer (2, 4, 6–9, 14, 18)
- Bill Deaton – producer (11)
- John Hartley – producer (17)
- Skye McCaskey – engineer (1, 3, 17)
- Derri Daugherty – engineer (17)
- Jordan Richter – engineer (17)
- F. Reid Shippen – mixing (1, 3)
- Dan Shike – mix assistant (1, 3)
- Shane D. Wilson – mixing (17)
- Ken Love – mastering at MasterMix (Nashville, Tennessee)
- Amy Guenthner – A&R coordinator
- Susannah Parrish – creative coordinator
- Scott McDaniel – art direction
- Mike Rapp – art direction
- Kevin Tucker – packaging design
- Kristin Barlowe – photography
- Sheila Davis – make-up
- Brady Warlaw – make-up

== Reception ==
Allmusic gave the album 3 of 5 stars. John DeBiase at JesusFreak gave it 3.5 of 5 stars, naming the new track "I Thank You" as a "hit to be", but stating that "Expressions of your Love" would have benefited from less Tomlin and more St. James. He recommend the disc to new listeners of St. James as a "perfect introduction" to the singer. The album charted for 6 weeks among Billboard Magazine's Christian Albums rankings, peaking at No. 16.

The album's two singles, "Expressions of Your Love" and "I Thank You" both got major radio play in the US with the latter hitting No. 1. In the UK the songs, failed to chart on the Top 100 songs of 2004, but in Australia "Expressions of Your Love" hit No. 17 and "I Thank You" hit No. 20 on the Top 100 Songs of 2003.

For the year 2003, The Rock Across Australia (provider of weekly Australian Christian music charts) ranked "I Thank You" and "Expressions of Your Love" at No. 8 and No. 16 among Most Played Songs, No. 3 and No. 6 among most played songs by Australasian Artists, and No. 1 and No. 1 during 2 months and 1 month, respectively.
