= DeGarmo and Key =

American Christian rock band

DeGarmo & Key
- DeGarmo & Key – Destined to Win: The Classic Rock Collection (1992)

Background information
- Origin: Memphis, Tennessee
- Genre: Christian rock
- Years active: 1978–2010
- Labels: Lamb & Lion; Power Discs; ForeFront; Benson; Sparrow
- Past members: Eddie DeGarmo; Dana Key; Tommy Cathey; Greg Morrow; Kevin Rodell; Tony Pilcher; Mark Pogue

DeGarmo & Key was a Christian rock band/duo formed in 1977 by Eddie DeGarmo and Dana Key.

The group is notable for having the first Christian rock album nominated for a Grammy award and the first American Christian group to have a video entered into MTVs rotation. They are also noted as being among the first groups to raise the level of technical excellence to match general market releases of the time.

While the group played blues based rock with a minor British progressive rock influence, they migrated to a more pop and rock style as time went on.

Some of their more notable hits include: "Destined to Win", "Let the Whole World Sing", "Six, Six, Six", "Boycott Hell", "Every Moment" and "Casual Christian". The group is also noted for their albums Streetlight (1986), D&K (1987), and The Pledge (1989). The group was nominated for seven Grammy Awards and five Dove Awards.

DeGarmo and Key disbanded in 1995.

== Members ==
DeGarmo played keyboards and sang background vocals (and occasionally lead), while Key played lead guitar and did the majority of the lead vocals. The other musicians at the time of formation in the late '70s were John Hamptone, David Spain, Max Richardson and Terry Moxley (drums) along with Joe Hardy and Ken Porter (bass). Later members included Tommy Cathey on bass (1982), Greg Morrow on drums as well as Tony Pilcher on rhythm and second lead guitar. Other musicians who have recorded or toured with DeGarmo & Key include Kenny Porter (bass), Kevin Rodell (drums), Chuck Reynolds (drums), Steve Taylor (guitar) (not related to another Steve Taylor, who is also a contemporary Christian artist) and Mark Pogue (guitar).

== History ==
Eddie DeGarmo and Dana Key grew up in Whitehaven, Tennessee; a large neighborhood in South Memphis which is also home to Graceland. Key indicated in an interview that Elvis Presley was one of his earliest musical influences. Key and DeGarmo met in first grade at Graves Elementary. There is disagreement among sources as to when the pair formed their first band, Globe. It may have been during their fifth- sixth- or seventh- grade year at Graves or Hillcrest. While at Hillcrest High School, Globe had signed with Hi Records which was owned by Willie Mitchell at that time.

In 1972, DeGarmo - responding to an altar call from David Wilkerson at a Dallas Holm concert -and Key - witnessed to by DeGarmo in a janitor's closet - became Christians while seniors at Hillcrest High. They approached the other members in Globe wanting to change the direction of the band to Christian music. After much discussion, Key and DeGarmo parted with their bandmates as friends, leaving Globe at some point in 1972. The two put music on hold for a time and chose to do ministry work for Youth for Christ, along with opening a storefront coffeehouse. Influenced by Larry Norman's 1972 album, Only Visiting This Planet, they saw in Norman's work what they believed God could do through Contemporary Christian music. A decision was made to put together a trio which they called The Christian Band before changing their name to The DeGarmo and Key Band before their first commercial release. Youth for Christ loaned the band money to record a demo tape which contributed to them securing a contract with Lion & Lamb and releasing their debut album, This Time Thru, in 1977. The Straight On album, which showed a prog rock influence, followed in 1979, later making the critic's poll of the 100 best albums list published by CCM in 2001. The group's third album, This Ain't Hollywood released in 1980, became the first Christian rock album to be nominated for a Grammy for best Gospel performance, contemporary or inspirational. The album included a duet with Amy Grant, "Nobody Loves Me Like You Do".

This association lead to Grant touring with D&K as an opening act with D&K as her musical support/backup band in 1981. This was Grant's first big tour and was a boost for both artists. Dan Brock, D&K's manager/booking agent, explained, "She was the darling of the gospel industry at that time and they (D&K) were the outcasts. We (D&K) got a lot of bad press from the gospel establishment people who said they were ruining Amy's music by playing it too loud, but at the time she was drawing a couple thousand people and we were only drawing about 400 or 500, so it gave us a lot of exposure." This pairing did close to 40 dates and improved Grant's act along with giving her a harder rock sound. Some of the dates were recorded resulting in Grant's two releases, Amy Grant: In Concert and In Concert Vol. 2.

With the release of their sixth album, Communication, DeGarmo & Key became the first American Christian group to have a music video appear on MTV. The video production of "Six, Six, Six", one of the songs included on Communication, became the first song from a religious record label to be placed in MTV's regular rotation. The original video for the song was one of a number of videos that MTV pulled from rotation due to violent content. The removal was prompted by a public reaction to the U.S. Senate hearings on sex and violence in music. MTV had misinterpreted the song "Six, Six, Six" as an anti-Christian statement. According to industry news reports at the time, MTV executive Sandra Sparrow was unaware that DeGarmo & Key were a Christian band when she included the video in a list of videos to be excised. MTV allowed DeGarmo & Key to submit a re-edited version which was placed back into light rotation. Removed from the re-edited video was a short scene of a man representing the Antichrist being set on fire. Another notable inclusion on the album was a cover of Pacific Gas & Electric's (which was founded by Glenn Schwartz of the All Saved Freak Band) "Are You Ready".

The first 100,000 copies of D&K, the group's ninth album, was packaged with a free second copy with identical content so the buyer could give the copy to an "unsaved friend". Promotion for their eleventh album, The Pledge released in 1989, used the tag line "Take the Pledge - Read the Word" and was made in concert with the publisher of the New International Version of the bible. For the 1991 album release, Go to the Top, the duo developed and published a bible study curriculum to go with the album. During their time together both Key and DeGarmo recorded two solo albums apiece.

In 1994 they released their final album together, "To Extremes". This album had a much edgier, more modern rock-based sound than their previous albums. Key was also experimenting with different tunings, some songs tuned down as low as Drop B.

== Awards ==
During early 2007 Key and DeGarmo received the ASCAP Vision Award at the 29th Annual ASCAP Christian Music Awards. The duo were 2010 inductees into the Gospel Music Association's Hall of Fame in January 2011.

== Reunions ==
Key and DeGarmo reunited to do a concert on October 21, 2007, at TLC Church in Cordova, Tennessee. They also performed at the 2008 Cornerstone Festival in Bushnell, Illinois.

== Personal notes ==
DeGarmo is a descendant of Davy Crockett. In 1987 DeGarmo, along with Key, Dan R. Brock and Ron W. Griffin, co-founded ForeFront Records for which DeGarmo worked until leaving the label in 1999. Season 3 American Idol finalist Diana DeGarmo is his niece.

Key was a descendant of Francis Scott Key. He was an executive with Ardent Records and authored two books: Don't Stop the Music Zondervan (1989) and By Divine Design B & H Pub Group (1995). Key died on June 6, 2010, from complications associated with a blood clot. Although he had had previous health problems, his death was unexpected.

== Discography ==
This Time Thru

- Released: 1978
- Format: LP
- Label: Lamb & Lion Records
- Producer: Joseph Hardy, Dana Key, and Eddie DeGarmo
- Tracks: "Emmanuel", "Addey", "Only the Meek Survive", "Too Far Too Long", "Alleyways of Strife", "Sleeper", "Wayfaring Stranger", "In the Days of Thy Youth", "Chase the Wind", "This Time Thru"

Straight On

- Released: 1979
- Format: LP
- Label: Lamb & Lion Records
- Producer: Joseph Hardy, Dana Key, and Eddie DeGarmo
- Tracks: "Jericho", "Livin' on the Edge of Dyin'", "Go Tell Them", "Bad Livin'", "Enchiridion", "Long Distance Runner", "Let Him Help You Today", "I Never Knew You", "Mary"

This Ain't Hollywood

- Released: 1980
- Format: LP
- Label: Lamb & Lion Records
- Producer: Ron Capone
- Tracks: "Stella, This Ain't Hollywood", "When He Comes Back", "You Gave Me All", "Never Be the Same", "All Night", "Love Is All You Need", "Nobody Loves Me", "Light of the World", "Over and Over", "One Step Closer"

No Turning Back: Live

- Released: 1982
- Format: Double LP
- Label: Lamb & Lion Records
- Tracks: "Light of the World", "Go Tell Them", "Stella, This Ain't Hollywood", "When He Comes Back", "Jericho", "Alleyways of Strife", "Mary", "Wayfaring Stranger", "Bass Solo", "Enchiridion", "Long Distance Runner", "Matter of Time", "Emmanuel", "Oklahoma Blues", "Preacher (I'll Need a Friend)", "Over and Over", "Let Him Help You Today", "Love One Another", "I Have Decided"

Mission of Mercy

- Released: 1983
- Format: LP
- Label: Power Discs
- Producer: Eddie DeGarmo and Dana Key
- Tracks: "Ready or Not", "Special Kind of Love", "When It's Over", "All the Losers Win", "The Gift", "Fill Me Lord", "Let the Whole World SIng", "In His Love", "Everlasting Love", "You Can't Run from Thunder", "That's the Way God Planned It"

Communication

- Released: 1984
- Format: LP
- Label: Power Discs
- Producer: Eddie DeGarmo and Dana Key
- Tracks: "Are You Ready", "Rejoice", "It's a Shame", "Alleluia, Christ Is Coming", "Everyday a Celebration", "Blessed Messiah", "Perfect Reflection", "He Has Risen", "Six, Six, Six", "Man of His Word", "Dear Friend"

Commander Sozo and the Charge of the Light Brigade

- Released: 1985
- Format: LP
- Label: Power Discs
- Producer: Eddie DeGarmo and Dana Key
- Tracks: "Activate", "Competition", "Temporary Things", "Apathy Alert", "Charge of the Light Brigade", "Destined to Win", "No More Goodbye", "Jesus Is Coming", "Rise Up", "Casual Christian"

Streetlight

- Released: 1986
- Format: CD
- Label: Power Discs
- Producer: DeGarmo & Key and John Hampton
- Tracks: "Every Moment", "War Zone", "Addey", "Soldier of Fortune", "Don't Stop the Music", "Don't Throw Your Love Away", "Video Action", "She Believes", "Holy Hustle", "Up on a Cross", "Inside Out"

Degarmo And Key

- Released: 1987
- Format: CD
- Label: Power Discs
- Producer: DeGarmo & Key and John Hampton
- Tracks: "Out of the Danger Zone", "Under the Son", "Rock Solid", "Teenage Suicide", "Strength of Love", "Brother Against Brother (It's Not Right)", "War with the World", "Stand", "Radical", "When the Son Begins to Reign"

Rock Solid: Absolutely Live

- Released: 1988
- Format: CD
- Label: Power Discs/ForeFront Records
- Producer: DeGarmo & Key
- Tracks: "Casual Christian (Chorus)", "Rock Solid", "Ready or Not", "Soldier of Fortune", "Six, Six, Six", "Don't Stop the Music", "Holy Hustle", "When the Son Begins to Reign", "Are You Ready", "Addey", "Let the Whole World Sing", "Alleluia, Christ Is Coming", "Destined to Win", "Rock Solid (Reprise)"

Feels Good to Be Forgiven (Eddie DeGarmo solo album)

- Released: 1988
- Format: CD
- Label: ForeFront Records
- Producer: Ron W. Griffin
- Tracks: "Heaven's 9*1*1", "Stayin' on the High Road", "Feels Good to Be Forgiven", "Pickin' Up the Pieces", "Turn on Heaven's Power", "Goodbye Mr. Heartache", "Thank You", "I Believe", "Faith Like a Rock", "I Ain't Gonna Lose", "I Wanna Praise You", "Yes Indeed"

The Pledge

- Released: 1989
- Format: CD
- Label: Benson Records
- Producer: Ron W. Griffin
- Tracks: "Boycott Hell", "Aliens and Strangers", "I'm Accepted", "Hand in Hand", "The Pledge", "Life in the New Age", "Let's Get Upset", "Who Will", "Right on Track", "If God Is for Us (Who Can Be Against Us)"

Phase II (Eddie DeGarmo solo album)

- Released: 1990
- Format: CD
- Label: Power Discs
- Tracks: "Fragile Heart", "Can't Stand Still", "My Way Home", "Phase II", "There's Something About That Name", "Prayed for a Woman Like You", "Make it Count", "Profession of Faith", "Shoreline", "Forgive Me for Doubting You", "Beyond the Tears"

Go to the Top

- Released: 1991
- Format: CD
- Label: Benson Records
- Producer: Ron W. Griffin
- Tracks: "I Believe", "Go to the Top", "At the Top (reprise)", "Against the Night", "Ultimate Ruler", "Soul Mender", "Family Reunion", "Still at Work", "Stand, Fight, Win", "Victory (March on Prelude)", "March On", "The Rest of My Life"

Destined to Win: The Classic Rock Collection

- Released: 1992
- Format: CD
- Label: ForeFront Records
- Tracks: "Color Me Gone", "Boycott Hell", "Rock Solid", "Every Moment", "Addey", "I'm Accepted", "Six, Six, Six", "I'll Come Out Fighting for You", "Destined to Win", "Ready or Not", "Long Distance Runner", "Hand in Hand", "Casual Christian", "Let the Whole World Sing"

Heat It Up

- Released: 1993
- Format: CD
- Label: Benson Records
- Producer: John Hampton, Eddie DeGarmo, and Dana Key
- Tracks: "Voices", "God Good/Devil Bad", "Selective Amnesia", "Never Look Back", "Heat. It. Up.", "It's My Business", "Dare 2B Different", "Talk to Me", "Armed and Dangerous", "I Use the J Word", "Soldiers of the Cross", "Divine Embrace", "Fight Back"

To Extremes

- Released: 1994
- Format: CD
- Label: Benson Records
- Producer: John Hampton, Eddie DeGarmo, and Dana Key
- Tracks: "Stressed", "Hangin' By a Scarlet Thread", "Rebel for God", "Judgment Day", "Hyper-Faith", "To Extremes", "Carry the Cross", "Dangerous Place", "Reclaim America"

Greatest Hits

- Released: 1994
- Format: CD
- Label: ForeFront Records
- Tracks: "Every Moment", "Out of the Danger Zone", "Boycott Hell", "All the Losers Win", "Jericho", "Are You Ready", "Destined to Win", "Acoustic Medley: Long Distance Runner/Rock Solid/Six, Six, Six", "Ultimate Ruler", "Let's Get Upset", "Competition", "I Believe", "Emmanuel", "Mary", "If God Is for Us (Who Can Be Against Us)"

History Makers: 15 Of The Band's Greatest Recordings

- Released: 2003
- Format: CD
- Label: Sparrow Records
- Tracks: "Addey", "Wayfaring Stranger", "Emmanuel", "Too Far, Too Long", "Jericho", "Long Distance Runner", "All the Losers Win", "Let the Whole World Sing", "Six, Six, Six", "Destined to Win", "Every Moment", "I'm Accepted", "Hand in Hand", "Boycott Hell", "Rebel for God"

Very Best of DeGarmo & Key

- Released: 2006
- Format: CD
- Label: ForeFront Records
- Tracks: "Out of the Danger Zone", "Every Moment", "I'm Accepted", "Six, Six, Six", "Long Distance Runner", "Casual Christian", "Destined to Win", "Competition", "All the Losers Win", "Boycott Hell", "If God Is for Us (Who Can Be Against Us)", "Rock Solid"

== Videography ==
- Visions of the Light Brigade, 1985: featuring music videos for: "Competition," "Six, Six, Six" (edited version for MTV), "Six, Six, Six" (original un-edited version), "Destined to Win" (with Jessie Dixon), and "Alleluia Christ is Coming".
- The Air Care Project: Rock 'n' Roll Outreach to Africa, 1987: featuring music videos for: "Activate", "Up On a Cross", "Casual Christian", and "Every Moment".
- Rock Solid... The Rock-U-Mentary!", 1988: Live concert, featuring the line-up of songs from the album "Rock Solid: Absolutely Live". Also on the video is a brief history of DeGarmo & Key, comically reported by a "news reporter" (played by Jim J. Bullock) while trying to interview DeGarmo & Key.
- Take the Pledge, 1989: featuring music videos for: "Hand in Hand", "Rock Solid", "The Pledge", "Feels Good to Be Forgiven" (Eddie DeGarmo), and also "Heavenbound" by DC Talk. Also on the video is an interview with Eddie DeGarmo and Dana Key by 1989 CCM Magazine editor, John W. Styll.
- Go to the Top, 1991: featuring music videos "shot on location in Memphis, Tennessee": "I Believe", "Ultimate Ruler", "Go to the Top", "Against the Night", "Family Reunion", "The Rest of My Life". Also featured on the video are highlights of Memphis, Tennessee, "shot on location".

== Links ==
- The Unofficial DeGarmo & Key Homepage
