= Rebecca St. James: Extended Play Remixes =

Extended Play Remixes

Remix album by Rebecca St. James
- Released: 20 July 1995
- Genre: Christian rock, Christian pop
- Label: ForeFront

Rebecca St. James chronology
Rebecca St. James (1994)	Extended Play Remixes (1995)	God (1996)

Extended Play Remixes is an EP by then-teenage Christian pop and rock singer/songwriter Rebecca St. James. It was released on 20 July 1995, and contains remixes of three of her songs from the album Rebecca St. James.

The EP was released on Forefront Records (catalog 5126). Upon its release in the UK in 1996, Cross Rhythms Magazine reviewer Dave Drodge wrote that the first three tracks were "good, if ... sugary", with a "successful trance feel" on two of them. He found "Everything I Do" highly danceable while retaining the lyrics: "very good." Drodge subtracted a point for the EP's price being higher than the import version, giving a total score of six "boxes" out of ten.

== Track listing ==
1. "Side By Side" (Brothers Keeper Extended Remix) – 6:54
2. "Side By Side" (Trance Phonix Mix) – 5:38
3. "Side By Side" (Youtherial Mix) – 3:58
4. "We Don't Need It" (9070 Classic Mix) – 4:50
5. "Everything I Do" (Down Under Dub) – 5:50

== See also ==
- Extended Play Remixes, for other EPs of the series
