= The Frontier Boys =

2011 film

- Directed by: John Grooters
- Screenplay by: John Grooters; Jeff Barker
- Produced by: John Grooters; Judy Grooters; Holly McClure
- Starring: Rebecca St. James; Big Kenny; Earthquake Kelley; Timothy Lofing; Jedidiah Grooters; Jake Boyce; Taylor DeRoo; Gregory Myhre; Rodney Wiseman
- Cinematography: Bryan Papierski
- Edited by: Vincent Boileau; John Grooters
- Music by: Eric Schrotenboer
- Production company: Frontier Boys
- Distributed by: Ferocious Films
- Release date: February 18, 2011
- Country: United States
- Language: English

The Frontier Boys is a 2011 independent action drama film written and directed by John Grooters, with appearances by Contemporary Christian music artist Rebecca St. James and country music singer Big Kenny.

== Plot ==
Four high-school friends in the small town of Charlevoix, Michigan find their basketball season disrupted when a drug dealer moves to town. Brent Fencett (Timothy Lofing) becomes a witness to the drive-by shooting of T.J. Lewis (Taylor DeRoo), the high school's basketball star. As witness, Brent must decide whether or not to give up his own brother to the police or protect him from the consequences. Meanwhile, Brent's good friend Jed Bracken (Jedidiah Grooters) attempts to uncover the truth behind the shooting - not realizing that his best friend has all the answers.

== Partial cast ==
- Rebecca St. James as Judy Bracken
- Big Kenny Alphin as Kevin Bracken
- Earthquake Kelley as Reverend Lewis
- Timothy Lofing as Brent Fencett
- Jedidiah Grooters as Jed Bracken
- Jake Boyce as Jackson Carlson
- Taylor DeRoo as T.J. Lewis
- Gregory Myhre as Mike Fencett
- Rodney Wiseman as Sean O'Sullivan
- Alex Lutz as Elk Rapids Basketball Player
- Marguerite Bolt as Charlevoix Cheerleader

== Production ==
The film was based upon a novel written by John Grooters and post-production was done entirely in Holland, Michigan, by his Michigan-based company Grooters Productions. Filming began in February 2010 with the use of local talent, and many scenes were shot in the producer's home town of Charlevoix, Michigan, with one historic home specifically razed by fire for an action sequence in the film. The film premiered on February 18, 2011, in Grand Rapids at "Celebration! Cinema North".

== Soundtrack ==
The soundtrack contains music from popular musicians Switchfoot, Rebecca St. James, Big Kenny, and Superchick.

== Distribution ==
The film debuted at the Michigan Film Festival in November 2010 and began limited theater release in February 2011. The film is being distributed by Ferocious Films as their first feature film release.

== Reception ==
In a review of the film, The Dove Foundation in describing the temptations available to high school students, called it a "powerful drama" and a "compelling story".

The Frontier Boys won the People's Choice Award at the Sabaoth International Film Festival in March 2011.
