= Pray (Rebecca St. James album) =

Studio album by Rebecca St. James
- Released: October 20, 1998
- Studios: Antenna Studios (Franklin, Tennessee); Sunset Boulevard Studios (Brentwood, Tennessee)
- Genres: CCM, pop rock
- Length: 60:04
- Label: ForeFront
- Producer: Tedd T

Rebecca St. James chronology
Christmas (1997)	Pray (1998)	Transform (2000)

Singles from Pray
- 1. "Pray" Released: 1998; 2. "Omega" Released: 1999; 3. "I'll Carry You" Released: 1999; 4. "Peace" Released: 1999; 5. "Give Myself Away" Released: 1999; 6. "OK" Released: 1999; 7. "Come Quickly Lord" Released: 2000

Professional ratings
Review scores
Source	Rating
Allmusic	2.5/5 stars
Jesus Freak Hideout	3.5/5 stars

Pray is the fifth studio album from Christian pop and rock artist Rebecca St. James. It was released on October 20, 1998, by ForeFront Records and was certified Gold by the RIAA in September 2006. The album won a Grammy Award for Rock Gospel Album of the Year, St. James's only Grammy so far. The album was produced by Tedd T.

== Track listing ==
No.	Title	Writer(s)	Length
1.	"Pray"	Rebecca St. James, Quinlan, Tedd T.	4:28
2.	"OK"	St. James, Becca Boucher, Butterfly Boucher, Joshua Thompson	4:37
3.	"Give Myself Away"	St. James, Paul A. Claegnes, Peter Morgan	3:48
4.	"Hold Me Jesus" (Rich Mullins cover)	Rich Mullins	5:04
5.	"I'll Carry You"	St. James, T.	4:41
6.	"Come Quickly Lord"	St. James, Daniel Smallbone	4:29
7.	"Peace"	St. James, T.	5:50
8.	"Mirror"	St. James, T.	4:35
9.	"Lord You're Beautiful" (Keith Green cover)	Keith Green	6:07
10.	"Love To Love You"	St. James, Quinlan, T.	5:01
11.	"Omega" (with hidden track "Be Thou My Vision")	St. James, T.	11:19

== Personnel ==
- Rebecca St. James – lead vocals, backing vocals (1–3, 5–7, 9, 10)
- Michael Quinlan – programming (1, 8, 11), guitars (4, 6, 10)
- Tedd T – programming (2, 3, 5–11), guitars (2, 4, 8)
- Byron Hagen – keyboards (6, 9, 10)
- Julian Kindred – keyboards (10)
- Charles Garrett – guitars
- George Cocchini – guitars (1, 3, 6, 7, 9, 10)
- Vince Emmett – guitars (1, 4, 6, 9)
- Andrew Ramsey – guitars (2)
- Lynn Nichols – guitars (6)
- Brent Milligan – bass (1, 5, 6, 8), guitars (8)
- James Gregory – bass (3, 7, 9, 10)
- Kevin Vonderhoffen – bass (4)
- Raymond Boyd – drums (1, 3, 6, 7, 9, 10)
- Scott Williamson – drums (2, 5)
- Derek Wyatt – drums (4), drum loops (10)
- Dan Needham – drums (8)
- Carl Marsh – strings (1)
- Eric Hauck – cello (4)
- John Catchings – strings (7, 9)
- David Davidson – strings (7, 9)
- Kristin Wilkinson – strings (7, 9)
- Daniel Smallbone – backing vocals (1, 6, 7)
- Tasia Tjornhom – backing vocals (1, 2, 5, 7, 9, 10)
- Holly Burt – backing vocals (6)
- Luke Smallbone – backing vocals (6)
- Josh Smallbone – backing vocals (6)
- Matthew White – backing vocals (6)

Choir on "Omega"

- Pearl Barrett, Byron Hagen, Michael Jones, Michael Quinlan, Mark Sizemore, Luke Smallbone, Ben Smallbone, Daniel Smallbone, Joel Smallbone, Josh Smallbone, Evan Smith, Kay Dekalb Smith, Jeanette Sullivan, Tasia Tjornhom, Luke Williams and Rock Williams

== Production ==
- Dan R. Brock – executive producer
- Eddie DeGarmo – executive producer
- Tedd T – producer
- Michael Quinlan – additional production
- Julian Kindred – additional production, recording, mixing (1–3, 6, 8, 9)
- Paul "Salvo" Salveson – mixing (4, 5, 7, 10)
- Marcelo Pennell – mixing (11)
- Shane D. Wilson – mixing ("Be Thou My Vision")
- Jim McCaslin – mix assistant
- Jim Adams – additional mix assistant
- Joseph Castroita – additional mix assistant
- David Das – additional mix assistant
- Jon Jewett – additional mix assistant
- Kevin B. Hipp – editing
- Stephen Marcussen – mastering at Precision Mastering (Hollywood, California)
- Tasia Tjornhom – project administrator
- Cindy Simmons – art direction
- Kerosene Halo – design
- Mark Tucker – photography
- David Smallbone – management

== Charts ==
Album - Billboard (North America)

Chart performance for Pray
Chart (1998)	Peak position
US Heatseekers Albums (Billboard)	5
US Billboard 200	168
US Christian Albums (Billboard)	5

Singles - CCM Magazine (North America)

Year	Single	Chart	Position
1998	"Mirror"	Christian Radio–Adult Contemporary	24
1998	"Pray"	Christian Radio–Adult Contemporary	2
1999	"Peace"	Christian Radio–Adult Contemporary	3

=== Radio success ===
In the United States the lead single "Pray" did well on the Christian Charts, while "Omega (Radio Remix)" also got good radio airplay. The song "Peace" did extremely well and is still heard on Christian Radio, ten years later in 2008. In the UK, "Pray", "I'll Carry You" and "Peace" all landed in the Top 100 Songs of 1999, while in Australia "Peace", "Give Myself Away", "Pray" and "OK" all made the Top 100 Songs of 1999. In 2000 "Omega" and "Come Quickly Lord" both landed in the Top 100 Songs of 2000 in Australia. Though never released as a single the song "Mirror" has become a major fan favorite.

== Compilation contributions ==
- WOW 1999... "Pray (Radio Edit)"
- WOW 2000... "Omega (Radio Remix)"
- People Get Ready: A Musical Collection Inspired by the Left Behind Series... "Come Quickly Lord"
- Power Jams... "I'll Carry You (Remix)"
- Listen:Louder... "Omega (Remix)"
- Wait for Me: The Best from Rebecca St. James... "Pray" and "Mirror"
- Rebecca St. James: The Ultimate Collection... "Pray" and "Mirror"
- Rebecca St. James: The Greatest Hits... "Pray" and "Mirror"

== No Secrets VHS/"Yes, I Believe In God" Single ==
In 1999, Rebecca released a VHS to go with the Pray album. It was entitled No Secrets and it featured interviews with herself, her family and some of her friends and fellow recording artists, plus the "Pray" Music Video. For a limited time the VHS came with a Yes, I Believe In God Single with 3 tracks:

1. Yes, I Believe in God
2. Omega Radio Remix
3. Pray Remix
