= Extended Play Remixes =

Extended Play Remixes can refer to the following Christian music remix EPs:

- Don't Censor Me: Extended Play Remixes by Audio Adrenaline
- Code of Ethics: Extended Play Remixes by Code of Ethics
- Free at Last: Extended Play Remixes by dc Talk
- Evolution: Extended Play Remixes by Geoff Moore and the Distance
- Rebecca St. James: Extended Play Remixes by Rebecca St. James
