= Wait for Me: Rediscovering the Joy of Purity in Romance =

Wait For Me: Rediscovering the Joy of Purity in Romance
- Author: Rebecca St. James
- Genre: Christian non-fiction
- Publisher: Nelson Books
- Publication date: July 2, 2002
- Publication place: United States
- Media type: Print (hardcover)
- Pages: 176
- ISBN: 978-0-7852-7127-7
- Dewey Decimal: 241/.66 21
- LC Class: BV4647.C5 S7 2002
- Followed by: Wait for Me Journal

Wait For Me: Rediscovering the Joy of Purity in Romance is a 2002 book written by Christian pop and rock singer-songwriter Rebecca St. James. It was inspired by her popular song, "Wait for Me", which was also the title of her 2000 46-city concert tour. The book, like the song, is about the values of remaining a virgin until marriage. The title also carried through to her 2003 compilation album, Wait For Me: The Best From Rebecca St. James. The book reached No. 1 on the Christian Booksellers Association Best Seller List for Young Adults.

In 2003, Rebecca released a personal journal for the book entitled Wait For Me Journal: Thoughts For My Future Husband. In 2005 she released a study guide for the book entitled Wait For Me Study Guide: Discover the Power of Purity.
