= God (Rebecca St. James song) =

Single by Rebecca St. James

from the album God
- Released: 1996
- Genre: Christian pop-rock
- Length: 4:08
- Label: ForeFront
- Songwriter(s): Rebecca St. James, Tedd T

Rebecca St. James singles chronology
"Here I Am" (1994)	"God" (1996)	"Abba (Father)" (1996)

"God" is a 1996 single by Christian pop-rock singer Rebecca St. James. The song is from the album of the same name.

== Track listing ==
1. "God" – 4:08
2. "God" (Remix) – 4:21
3. "Sweet, Sweet Song of Salvation" – 3:53
4. "Side By Side Remix" – 6:53
5. "He Is Exalted" – 3:31

The song "He Is Exalted" came from the album Prayers and Worship and Michelle Ray sang it. St.James did a spoken word performance in the beginning.

KJ-52 in 2005 did a remix of this song with St. James singing the chorus. The song is on the album Behind the Musik (A Boy Named Jonah).

== Music video ==
A music video for the song was released containing footage of the artist singing intermingled with clips of the sun and other nature scenes.
