= WOW Hits 2001 =

Compilation album by various artists
- Released: October 24, 2000
- Genre: Contemporary Christian music
- Labels: Sparrow Records / EMI Christian Music Group
- Producer: Various

WOW Hits chronology
| WOW 2000 (1999) | WOW Hits 2001 (2000) | WOW Hits 2002 (2001) |

Professional ratings
Review scores
| Source | Rating |
|---|---|
| Allmusic | 4/5 stars |

WOW Hits 2001 is a compilation album of thirty Contemporary Christian music hits and three bonus tracks that was released on October 24, 2000. It included some music video content accessible with a CD-ROM drive. The album reached No. 36 on the Billboard 200 chart, and No. 1 on the Top Contemporary Christian album chart. Album sales were certified as double platinum in 2002 by the Recording Industry Association of America (RIAA).

== Track listing ==
=== Silver disc ===
1. "Dive" – Steven Curtis Chapman
2. "Live for You" – Rachael Lampa
3. "Written On My Heart" – Plus One
4. "This Is Your Time" – Michael W. Smith
5. "Alabaster Box" – CeCe Winans
6. "Gather at the River (Remix)" - Point of Grace
7. ”Always Have, Always Will” - Avalon
8. "Crystal Clear" – Jaci Velasquez
9. "Every Season" – Nichole Nordeman
10. "I Am The Way" – Mark Schultz
11. "Free" – Ginny Owens
12. "More Than You'll Ever Know" – Watermark
13. "When I Praise" – FFH
14. "This Good Day" – Fernando Ortega
15. "Redeemer" – Nicole C. Mullen
16. "Lord, I Come Before You" – Salvador **

=== Blue disc ===
1. "Set Your Eyes to Zion" – P.O.D.
2. "Shackles (Praise You)" – Mary Mary
3. "King of Glory" – Third Day
4. "Beautiful Sound" – Newsboys
5. "Into You" – Jennifer Knapp
6. "Red Letters" – dc Talk
7. "Unforgetful You" – Jars of Clay
8. "The Only One" – Caedmon's Call
9. "Reborn" – Rebecca St. James
10. "God You Are My God" – Delirious?
11. "Follow Your Dreams" – Raze
12. "Don't Look at Me" – Stacie Orrico
13. "God of Wonders" – Third Day & Caedmon's Call
14. "America" – Passion
15. "Hands and Feet" – Audio Adrenaline
16. "Whitehorse" – Earthsuit **
17. "Where I Wanna Be" – V*Enna **

** Denotes Bonus Track

== Charts ==
=== Weekly charts ===
| Chart (2000) | Peak position |
|---|---|
| US Billboard 200 | 36 |
| US Top Christian Albums (Billboard) | 1 |

=== Year-end charts ===
| Chart (2001) | Position |
|---|---|
| US Billboard 200 | 128 |

== Certifications ==
| Region | Certification | Certified units/sales |
|---|---|---|
| United States (RIAA) | 2× Platinum | 2,000,000^{^} |
^{^} Shipments figures based on certification alone.
