= I Will Praise You =

Studio album by Rebecca St. James
- Released: 5 April 2011
- Recorded: 2010
- Studio: Zoo Studios (Franklin, Tennessee)
- Genre: Praise & worship, CCM
- Length: 44:42
- Label: Reunion/Beach Street/Essential
- Producer: Mark Miller

Rebecca St. James chronology
| aLIVE in Florida (2007) | I Will Praise You (2011) | Dawn (2020) |

Singles from I Will Praise You
- 1. "Shine Your Glory Down" Released: 11 February 2011; 2. "I Will Praise You" Released: 18 June 2011

I Will Praise You is the ninth studio album by Christian pop singer Rebecca St. James. The album was released on 5 April 2011 on Reunion/Beach Street/Essential Records. It was announced on 3 January 2011 via St. James' official Facebook page. The album was met with positive critical reception and commercial success. It peaked at number nine on Billboard's Hot Christian Albums chart and number one-hundred fifty-three on the Billboard 200, her highest charting album after 2002's Worship God. Two singles were spawned from the album: "Shine Your Glory Down" and the title track.

== Background and development ==
On 22 July 2010, after almost five years of musical inactivity, St. James announced that she was writing and recording for a new album due for release in 2011. On 18 September she announced that she had recorded vocals for three songs off the album. In November, she tweeted that she had sung a new song titled "Everything" from her upcoming album at church. Later that month, it was announced in an official press release that St. James had parted ways with her label ForeFront Records after seventeen years. She joined the Provident Label Group, which harbours Reunion Records, Beach Street Records, and Essential Records. It was also mentioned that the album was produced by Casting Crowns producer Mark Miller. On 5 February, the official track list was revealed on Hearitfirst.com with music clips of each song.

== Writing and composition ==
In November 2010, St. James mentioned in a press release that she would retreat from the rock sound of If I Had One Chance to Tell You Something and release a worship album. Eight of the songs are original recordings, while St. James co-wrote five of them. First single, "Shine Your Glory Down", is a pop/rock song with lyrics about worshipping God and encountering his light. She further commented on the development of the song saying, "...in the middle of Hollywood, about 600 young people gather to worship, seeking God passionately, and every week our pastor is encouraging us to be that light in the darkness. So the song also represents what I encounter every week at my church." On 17 February she released an update about two of the new songs, "You Never Let Go" and "I Will Praise You". The former, a cover of the Matt Redman song, was picked because it inspired St. James not to worry. The title track was inspired by the music of Delirious?. Lyrically, St. James says, "...the song is about praising God no matter what the circumstances and in the midst of whatever season we are in. All seasons of our lives can be seasons of praise. In the darkest of times when you are sobbing your eyes out, God's hope is there in the middle of the pain." On 25 February St. James revealed the meaning behind track four, "You Still Amaze Me". She said, "When we began working on it, I could just feel it was meant for me. It's one of the songs on the album that represents the essence of Christianity. All the major elements of what we believe are here in the lyric. Theologically, it's very rich, but it's also very worshipful." "In a Moment" and "The Kindness of Our God" were both co-written by St. James' brother Joel Smallbone. The former is about anticipating the coming of Jesus, while the latter was inspired by St. James' mother. "When the Stars Burn Down" is about the day that someone meets Jesus Christ and realizes He is their Lord. St. James said of the song, "This song has that sense, that ultimate romantic moment with the lover of your soul, the moment you’ve anticipated your whole life, when you are the bride and He is the groom... That moment of knowing is the most beautiful thing ever. Insanely beautiful." St. James explained that "Almighty God" speaks of trusting God; "We all need that reminder to trust, to not rely on our own strength, but to live knowing that God is strong to save." "You Hold Me Now" was originally recorded by Christian music group Hillsong. Rebecca has stated that "You Make Everything Beautiful" is her favorite song. She commented on the meaning saying, "We added 'You Make Everything Beautiful' to the record at the last possible minute, but I couldn't leave it behind. The song is about that place of surrender where we let God beautify us, let him show us the truly unique person He has called us to be."

== Reception ==
=== Critical reception ===
Professional ratings
Review scores
| Source | Rating |
|---|---|
| AllMusic | 4/5 stars |
| Jesus Freak Hideout | 4/5 stars |
| Christianity Today | 3/5 stars |
| Cross Rhythms | 8/10 stars |

Critical reception for the album has been positive. Critics mainly commented on the maturity of St. James' new adult contemporary sound. Jesus Freak Hideout certified it "pre-order worthy" in its preview of the album. They felt it was a good musical platform for St. James saying, "For fans of Rebecca or modern worship that doesn't entirely adhere to the usual formula, I Will Praise You is looking to be a worthy reintroduction of St. James to the music world... and a worship project to stand out from the pack..." In their official review, they gave the album four out of five stars saying, "Though her sound and voice sound very little like her past work, her abilities have developed suitably and the difference is an advantage more than anything else. It may not be exactly what her fans expected, but I Will Praise You is a glorious return to music for Rebecca St. James." Dave Wood of Louder Than Music gave the album five out of five stars saying, "With this album, Rebecca would hold her own against any of the strong solo female artists of the modern era. There are touches of a young Madonna, and more modern influences from Dido, GaGa and Rihanna. At times you have to pinch yourself to realise you're listening to a worship album - sure the lyrics make it clear what message is being delivered - but musically it's as mainstream-friendly and relevant as any album you're likely to hear this year. A world-class album from Rebecca St. James." He went on to name "In a Moment", "You Never Let Go", and the title track as the album standouts. John Bowen of The Fish radio station praised St. James' musical choices and felt that she has found the perfect genre for her music. Kim Jones of About.com gave the album four of five stars and called it "reassuring". She later named "The Kindness of Our God" the best track. Robert Ham of Christianity Today gave the album three out of five stars saying, "...when the production and performance lock up like puzzle pieces, as it does on her cover of Matt Redman's "You Never Let Go" and the fantastic "The Kindness Of Our God", I Will Praise You is without peer." He also called the two mentioned songs and "You Still Amaze" me the top tracks. Laura Chambers of Christian Music Review gave the album a B+ stating, "A veteran of the Christian media scene, Rebecca St. James delivers with I Will Praise You. The album is laced with hope for the future all the way through. There is no question where Rebecca stands or where she is pointing to; the arms of an unfailing God." Jared Johnson of the AllMusic Guide awarded the album four out of five stars and said, "Though [I Will] Praise [You] may not be her most daring effort, it's another solid album from one of gospel music's most well-known artists." Ewan Jones of Cross Rhythms radio awarded the album eight out of ten stars, saying "In all this is a great collection of songs, well produced, immaculately performed and lyrically a great encouragement. Great to see the talented singer back in the CD racks after a wait of over five years."

== Chart performance ==
The album debuted at No. 18 on Billboard's Hot Christian Albums chart, four places lower than 2005's If I Had One Chance to Tell You Something. It later peaked at No. 9, which is her highest charting effort since 2002's Worship God. The album also peaked at No. 153 on the Billboard 200, which is her first appearance on the chart since 2004's Live Worship: Blessed Be Your Name peaked at No. 187. It's also her second highest charting effort overall after Worship God, which peaked at No. 94.

== Release and promotion ==
The album's title was unveiled by Rebecca St. James on 3 January 2011 via Twitter, Facebook, MySpace, and her official website. The official album cover was released on 2 February 2011 via Provident Label Group's official website. Two more songs from the album, the title track and "You Never Let Go", were premiered on 17 February. Track four, "You Still Amaze Me", was premiered on 25 February." Tracks five and six, "In a Moment" and "The Kindness of Our God", were premiered on 4 March. "When the Stars Burn Down" and "Almighty God" were premiered on 11 March. The final songs, "You Hold Me Now" and "You Make Everything Beautiful", were premiered on 18 March. On 15 March RSJames.com offered "Shine Your Glory Down" as a free download. The following day it premiered the album listening party if fans tweeted or Facebooked information about the album.

=== Singles ===
"Shine Your Glory Down" will serve as the lead single from the album. It premiered on 11 January 2011 via St. James's official website. It was released to radio on 11 February and to digital retailers on 15 February. So far it has charted only in Australia at No. 9 on the TRAA Contemporary Top 30. A month after the song was solicited to radios, it finally received two adds in America according to Radio and Records' Christian AC monitor. It later peaked at No. 30. The song was the 60th most-played song on Australian Christian radio in 2011.

"I Will Praise You" was released as the second single on 18 June in Australia. It has so far peaked at No. 30 on the TRAA Contemporary Top 30 chart.

== Track listing ==
| No. | Title | Writer(s) | Length |
|---|---|---|---|
| 1. | "I Will Praise You" | Jonathan Lee, Rebecca St. James, Fred Williams | 4:20 |
| 2. | "You Never Let Go" (Matt Redman cover) | Beth Redman, Matt Redman | 4:16 |
| 3. | "Shine Your Glory Down" | St. James, Jason Ingram | 3:34 |
| 4. | "You Still Amaze Me" | St. James, Mia Fieldes | 3:47 |
| 5. | "In a Moment" | Michael Neale, Joel Smallbone | 4:42 |
| 6. | "The Kindness of Our God" | J. Smallbone, St. James, Williams | 4:22 |
| 7. | "When the Stars Burn Down (Blessing and Honor)" | Lee, Jennie Lee Riddle | 4:16 |
| 8. | "Almighty God" | Ingram, Stu Garrard, Paul Mabury, Jon Thatcher | 4:58 |
| 9. | "You Hold Me Now" (Hillsong cover) | Matt Crocker, Reuben Morgan | 5:22 |
| 10. | "You Make Everything Beautiful" | St. James, Williams, Luke Smallbone | 3:05 |

== Personnel ==
- Rebecca St. James – vocals, backing vocals
- Blair Masters – keyboards, programming (1, 3, 10), acoustic piano (10)
- Fred Williams – programming, keyboards (10)
- Stu G – electric guitars (1–3, 5, 6, 8, 9)
- Mike Payne – electric guitars (1–7, 9)
- Dale Oliver – electric guitars (4–6)
- Shayne Hill – electric guitars (7, 8)
- John Mark Painter – bass (1–9), string arrangements (4, 5, 7, 9)
- Bobby Huff – drums (1–9)
- John Catchings – cello (4, 5, 7, 9)
- Kristin Wilkinson – viola (4, 5, 7, 9)
- David Angell – violin (4, 5, 7, 9)
- David Davidson – violin (4, 5, 7, 9)
- Mary Kathryn Vanosdale – violin (4, 5, 7, 9)
- Joel Smallbone – backing vocals (1–9)

Group vocals (Tracks 5, 7–9)

- Shawn Carnes, Lisa Goe, François Goodreault Jr., Jeffrey James, Holley Maher, Liz Poston and Jordyn Shellhart

== Production ==
- Terry Hemmings – executive producer
- Jason MacArthur – A&R
- Mark A. Miller – producer
- Joel Smallbone – additional vocal production, additional engineer, digital editing
- Sam Hewitt – recording, mixing
- Michael Hewitt – additional engineer, digital editing
- John Mark Painter – string engineer
- Werner Carrasco – digital editing
- Ainslie Grosser – digital editing
- Richard Dodd – mastering
- Michelle Box – A&R production
- Beth Lee – art direction
- Tim Parker – art direction, design
- Allister Ann – photography
- David K – stylist
- Megan Thompson – hair styling, make-up
- David Smallbone – management

== Charts ==
Chart performance for I Will Praise You
| Chart (2011) | Peak position |
|---|---|
| US Billboard 200 | 153 |
| US Top Christian Albums (Billboard) | 9 |

== Release history ==
| Region | Date | Format | Label |
|---|---|---|---|
| United States | 5 April 2011 | CD, digital download | Reunion Records, Beach Street Records, Essential Records |
