= God (Rebecca St. James album) =

Studio album by Rebecca St. James
- Released: 25 June 1996
- Recorded: 1996
- Genres: Christian rock, contemporary Christian music
- Length: 48:31
- Label: ForeFront
- Producer: Tedd T

Rebecca St. James chronology
Extended Play Remixes (1995)	God (1996)	Christmas (1997)

Singles from God
- 1. "God" Released: 1996; 2. "Abba (Father)" Released: 1996; 3. "You're the Voice" Released: 1996; 4. "Me Without You" Released: 1997; 5. "Go & Sin No More" Released: 1997

Professional ratings
Review scores
Source	Rating
AllMusic	4.5/5 stars
Jesus Freak Hideout	4/5 stars

God is the third studio album by then 18-year-old Christian pop and rock artist Rebecca St. James. It was released on 25 June 1996 by ForeFront Records, and peaked at No. 200 on the Billboard 200. The title song was featured on WOW#1s: 31 of the Greatest Christian Music Hits Ever, and WOW 1997. It was RIAA Certified Gold in 2005. This was the first of many Rebecca St. James albums produced by Tedd Tjornhom.

== Commercial performance ==
The song "God" was a hit in 1996, topping three Christian Rock Charts. The radio singles "You're the Voice", "Abba (Father)" and "Go & Sin No More" also did well, while the single "Me Without You" failed to gain major airplay. Though never released as singles "Psalm 139", "Speak to Me" and "You Then Me" have all become fan favorites.

== Track listing ==
No.	Title	Writer(s)	Length
1.	"God"	Rebecca St. James, Tedd T	4:08
2.	"You're the Voice" (John Farnham cover)	M. Ryder, K. Reed, A. Quinta, C. Thompson	5:00
3.	"You Then Me"	Bob Halligan, Jr., Graham Shaw	3:51
4.	"Speak to Me"	St. James, Josh Deaton, T.	4:44
5.	"Abba (Father)"	St. James, Otto Price, T.	5:20
6.	"Me Without You"	Martin Briley	4:14
7.	"That's What Matters"	St. James, T.	4:52
8.	"Carry Me High"	St. James, T.	4:40
9.	"A Cold Heart Turns"	St. James	2:54
10.	"Go and Sin No More" (with hidden track "Psalm 139")	St. James, Michael Anderson, T.	8:41

== Personnel ==
- Rebecca St. James – lead and backing vocals, arrangements
- Tedd T – arrangements, acoustic piano, Fender Rhodes, harmonica, programming, bass, percussion
- Carl Marsh – accordion, Mellotron, string arrangements
- David Cleveland – acoustic guitars
- Vince Emmett – electric guitar, steel guitar
- Brent Milligan – electric guitar, bass, percussion
- Otto Price – electric guitar, bass
- Chuck Zwicky – additional guitars (2)
- Dan Needham – drums, percussion
- Hunter Lee – Uilleann pipes, Irish flute, didjeridu
- Josh Smallbone – guest MC (8)
- Tina Keil – additional backing vocals (10)
- Paul Q-Pek – additional backing vocals (10)
- Lori Wilshire – additional backing vocals (10)
- Micah Wilshire – additional backing vocals (10)

== Production ==
- Dan R. Brock – executive producer
- Eddie DeGarmo – executive producer
- Tedd T – producer, recording
- Julian Kindred – recording, mix assistant (2–10)
- Tom Laune – recording
- Paul Salvo – recording
- Peter Briggs – recording assistant
- Greg Parker – recording assistant
- Shane D. Wilson – recording assistant
- John Hampton – mixing (1)
- Skidd Mills – mixing (1)
- Chuck Zwicky – mixing (2–10)
- Chuck Linder – mix assistant (2–10)
- Daryl Smith – mix assistant (2–10)
- Ken Love – mastering
- Tom Davis – art direction, design
- Jeff Frazier – photography
- Geenie Freeman – make-up
- David Smallbone – management

Studios

- Recorded at 9070 Studios (Brentwood, Tennessee).
- Track 1 mixed at Ardent Studios (Memphis, Tennessee).
- Tracks 2–10 mixed at 9070 Studios; Recording Arts Studio (Nashville, Tennessee); Gambit Studio (Gallatin, Tennessee); Secret Sound (Franklin, Tennessee).
- Mastered at MasterMix (Nashville, Tennessee).

== Charts ==
Chart performance for God
Chart (1996)	Peak position
US Heatseekers Albums (Billboard)	10
US Billboard 200	200
US Christian Albums (Billboard)	6

Singles - CCM Magazine (North America)

Year	Single	Chart	Position
1996	"God"	Christian Radio–Adult Contemporary	14
1996	"Go and Sin No More"	Christian Radio–Adult Contemporary	23
1997	"Abba (Father)"	Christian Radio–Adult Contemporary	15
1997	"Speak to Me"	Christian Radio–Adult Contemporary	31
1998	"Carry Me High"	Christian Radio–Adult Contemporary	36
