= Wait for Me (Rebecca St. James song) =

Single by Rebecca St. James

from the album Transform
- Released: 2000
- Genre: CCM, Christian rock
- Length: 4:40
- Label: ForeFront
- Songwriter: Rebecca St. James

Rebecca St. James singles chronology
"Omega" (1998)	"Wait for Me" (2000)	"Reborn" (2000)

"Wait for Me" is a song by contemporary Christian musician Rebecca St. James. It is one of St. James' most well-known songs, encouraging sexual abstinence until marriage. "Wait for Me" peaked in the top two on Radio & Records CHR Top 30 chart in September 2001. "Wait For Me" was nominated for Song of the Year at the 2002 Dove Awards. This song also appears on the WOW Hits 2002 compilation album.

== Music video ==
A music video for the song was made and shows Rebecca writing a letter to her future husband. It also shows scenes of St. James riding in a car.

== Books ==
In 2000, St. James anticipated using the song to promote Joshua Harris's book Boy Meets Girl: Say Hello to Courtship. In July 2002, St. James released a book inspired by the song entitled, Wait for Me: Rediscovering the Joy of Purity in Romance. More than 100,000 copies and have been sold, and a companion journal and study guide were also published.

== See also ==
- Purity rings
