= Christmas (Rebecca St. James album) =

Studio album by Rebecca St. James
- Released: 7 October 1997
- Genre: Christmas music, contemporary Christian music
- Length: 43:24
- Label: ForeFront
- Producer: Tedd T

Rebecca St. James chronology
God (1996)	Christmas (1997)	Pray (1998)

Professional ratings
Review scores
Source	Rating
AllMusic	3/5 stars

Christmas is the fourth studio album and first Christmas album from Christian pop rock singer Rebecca St. James. It was released on 7 October 1997 through ForeFront Records. The album was produced by Tedd T.

== Track listing ==
No.	Title	Writer(s)	Length
1.	"Sweet Little Jesus Boy"	Robert Mac Gimsey	3:59
2.	"Happy Christmas"	John Lennon, Yoko Ono	3:40
3.	"O Come, O Come, Emmanuel"	Traditional	5:20
4.	"One Small Child"	David Meece	3:25
5.	"Silent Night"	Franz Gruber, Joseph Mohr	5:51
6.	"O Holy Night"	Adolphe Adam, John Sullivan Dwight	4:56
7.	"What Child Is This"	William Chatterton Dix, Traditional	4:26
8.	"Jesu, Joy of Man's Desiring"	J.S. Bach	3:47
9.	"O Come, All Ye Faithful"	Frederick Oakeley, John Francis Wade	4:34
10.	"A Cradle Prayer"	Rebecca St. James, Charles Garrett	3:26

== Personnel ==
- Rebecca St. James – lead and backing vocals
- Tedd T – arrangements, programming, keyboards, loops, guitar, electric guitar
- Byron Hagen – Hammond organ, string arrangements
- David Cleveland – acoustic guitar
- Vince Emmett – mandolin
- Charles Garrett – acoustic guitar, electric guitar
- Carlos Pennell – guitar
- Micah Wilshire – acoustic guitar
- Chuck Zwicky – guitar
- Brent Milligan – guitar, bass
- Otto Price – bass
- Dan Needham – drums
- Andrew Payne – drums, djembe
- Carl Marsh – string arrangements
- John Catchings – cello
- Antoine Silverman – violin

Production

- Tedd T – producer, engineer
- Dan Brock – executive producer
- Eddie DeGarmo – executive producer
- Jullian Kindred – engineer, mixing
- Michael Quinlan – engineer
- Marcelo Pennell – mixing
- Chuck Zwicky – mixing
- Ken Love – mastering at Master Mix (Nashville, TN).
- Tom Davis – art direction, design
- Frank W. Ockenfels III – photography

== Charts ==
Album - Billboard (North America)

Year	Chart	Position
1997	Top Heatseekers	12
1997	Top Contemporary Christian	14

Singles - CCM Magazine (North America)

Year	Single	Chart	Position
1997	"Sweet Little Jesus Boy"	Christian Radio–Adult Contemporary	19

=== Singles ===
Although no official radio singles released off Christmas, a music video was made for "O Come All Ye Faithful".

== Note ==
The signature "war is over" chant in "Happy Christmas" (she spells out the whole word) and also the eponymous part of the song's title itself are intentionally omitted by the artist. In 2003, she read letters from United States soldiers to be aired on Fox News Channel during the Christmas season; furthermore, she and her record label, EMI Group plc, have released a music video of her song "I Thank You" (from Wait for Me) that saluted all troops (especially US, UK, Australia) in the successful conquest against Saddam Hussein in Iraq.
