= Rebecca St. James (album) =

Studio album by Rebecca St. James
- Released: 24 January 1994
- Studio: The Bennett House (Franklin, Tennessee); OmniSound Studios and Sixteenth Avenue Sound (Nashville, Tennessee); Audio Impact (London, UK)
- Genre: CCM, Gospel
- Length: 37:25
- Label: ForeFront
- Producer: Bill Deaton

Rebecca St. James chronology
Refresh My Heart (1991)	Rebecca St. James (1994)	Extended Play Remixes (1995)

Professional ratings
Review scores
Source	Rating
Allmusic	3/5 stars
Jesus Freak Hideout	4/5 stars

Rebecca St. James is the second album by then-teenage Christian pop rock artist Rebecca St. James. It was released on 24 January 1994 by ForeFront Records. This is the only album by St. James that was produced by Bill Deaton. KLOVE said that the album "featured hit singles 'Here I Am' and 'Side by Side'".

== Track listing ==
No.	Title	Writer(s)	Length
1.	"Here I Am"	Bill Deaton, Rebecca St. James, Eric Champion	3:52
2.	"Everything I Do"	St. James, Mike Demus, Connie Harrington	3:37
3.	"Little Bit of Love"	St. James, Deaton, Demus	3:18
4.	"Side By Side"	Eddie DeGarmo, Bob Farrell	3:55
5.	"True Love"	Johnny Christopher, Mike Douglas	3:38
6.	"Way Up Here"	DeGarmo, Farrell	3:38
7.	"Above All Things"	DeGarmo	4:20
8.	"I Thank You Lord"	Farrell, Greg Nelson	3:52
9.	"We Don't Need It"	St. James, Deaton, Blair Masters	4:11
10.	"Jesus Loves the Little Children"	Traditional; Additional lyrics: Bill Deaton, Blair Masters	3:09

== Personnel ==
- Rebecca St. James – vocals
- Blair Masters – keyboards, arrangements (10)
- Dann Huff – guitars
- Tommy Sims – bass
- Chester Thompson – drums
- Eric Darken – tambourine (5)
- Bill Deaton – arrangements (10)
- Bob Carlisle – backing vocals
- Lisa Cochran – backing vocals
- Chris Eaton – backing vocals
- Kim Fleming – backing vocals
- Amy Joy – backing vocals
- Juli Brazzell, Stephanie Brooks, Megan Dockery, Emily Estes, Rachel Howell and Jeanette Taylor – Children's choir (4)
- Norm Branstromm – vocal coach

Production

- Brown Bannister – executive producer
- Bill Deaton – producer, engineer, mixing
- Pete Martinez – assistant engineer
- Shawn McLean – assistant engineer
- Carry Summers – assistant engineer
- Doug Sax – mastering at The Mastering Lab (Hollywood, California)
- Sharon Anderson - art direction, design
- Susan DeGarmo – art direction, design
- Russ Harrington – photography
- Claudia McConnell-Fowler – stylist
- Carol Maxwell – make-up

== Chart performance ==
Billboard Contemporary Christian No. 33.
