= Refresh My Heart =

Studio album by Rebecca St. James
- Released: 1991
- Genre: Gospel, CCM
- Length: 54:43
- Label: DTS
- Producer: Beeb Birtles

Rebecca St. James chronology
Refresh My Heart (1991)	Rebecca St. James (1994)

Refresh My Heart is the debut album from then-teenage Christian pop rock artist Rebecca St. James. It was released under the name Rebecca Jean by DTS Music and distributed by Word Australia sometime within the first seven months and 25 days of 1991 when St. James was still 13 years old. It was later re-released without an associated label. According to her Facebook page, this album is composed entirely of Hillsong songs.

== Track listing ==
No.	Title	Length
1.	"I Am Your Child"	4:48
2.	"The Rock Medley"	7:15
3.	"Show Your Glory"	4:38
4.	"Blessing, Honour"	4:27
5.	"We Will Not Bow to the World"	3:49
6.	"Refresh My Heart"	3:25
7.	"The Soul Medley"	7:14
8.	"Children of the King"	4:01
9.	"I Will Lift My Voice"	6:40
10.	"And We Behold Him"	3:08
11.	"Who Is He"	5:01
12.	"Refresh My Heart" (Reprise)	0:22
