= Unsung Hero (film) =

2024 film by Richard Ramsey and Joel Smallbone

- Theatrical release poster
- Directed by: Richard Ramsey; Joel Smallbone
- Written by: Richard Ramsey; Joel Smallbone
- Produced by: Josh Walsh; Luke Smallbone; Justin Tolley; Joel Smallbone
- Starring: Daisy Betts; Joel Smallbone; Kirrilee Berger; Jonathan Jackson; Lucas Black; Candace Cameron Bure; Terry O'Quinn
- Cinematography: Johnny Derango
- Edited by: Parker Adams
- Music by: Brent McCorkle
- Production companies: Kingdom Story Company; Candy Rock Entertainment
- Distributed by: Lionsgate
- Release date: April 26, 2024 (United States)
- Running time: 113 minutes
- Country: United States
- Language: English
- Budget: $6 million
- Box office: $21.1 million

Unsung Hero is a 2024 American Christian drama film written and directed by Richard Ramsey and Joel Smallbone. It follows Rebecca, Joel, and Luke Smallbone of For King & Country and their life journey to become Christian recording artists.

Unsung Hero was released in North America on April 26, 2024. The film received mixed reviews from critics and grossed $21.1 million at the box office.

== Plot ==
In 1991, the Smallbone family moved from Sydney, Australia to Nashville, Tennessee, in pursuit of a new beginning. David and his wife, Helen, uproot their lives and six children Rebecca, Daniel, Ben, Joel, Luke, and Joshua seeking refuge in Nashville after the collapse of David's music company in Australia following a $500,000 loss from a concert tour which failed to sell enough tickets in a deteriorated economy.

As the family settles into their new home, they encounter numerous challenges, including financial struggles and the daunting task of starting over in a foreign country. Despite the uncertainty, Helen's unwavering faith and David's determination propel them forward, instilling hope and resilience in their children.

After being reluctant due to his disappointments in the music industry, David listens to his wife and tries to get a contract with a record label for his daughter Rebecca, whose vocal talents are recognized by friends.

Joel and Luke eventually form the duo For King & Country, while Rebecca embarks on a quite successful career as a Christian recording artist.

== Cast ==
- Daisy Betts as Helen Smallbone
- Joel Smallbone as David Smallbone, Helen's husband
- Kirrilee Berger as Rebecca Smallbone, Helen & David's daughter
- Jonathan Jackson as Eddie DeGarmo
- Lucas Black as Jed Albright
- Hillary Scott as Luanne Meece
- Candace Cameron Bure as Kay Albright, Jed's wife
- Terry O'Quinn as Grandpa James, Helen's father
- Diesel Cash La Torraca as Joel Smallbone, Helen & David's third son
- JJ Pantano as Luke Smallbone, Helen & David's fourth son
- Paul Luke Bonenfant as Daniel Smallbone, Helen & David's first son
- Tenz McCall as Ben Smallbone, Helen & David's second son
- Angus K. Caldwell as Joshua Smallbone, Helen & David's fifth son
- Beau Wirick as Matt
- Don Most as Pierce
- Lance E. Nichols as Art Meriweather
- Rachel Hendrix as Amy Grant
- Roslyn Gentle as "Nana" Jean Francis
- Rebecca St. James as a flight attendant
- Kevin Downes as a suit

== Production ==
On November 30, 2022, Joel and Luke Smallbone announced via social media that they had made a film with their brother Ben about their mother. The film was set for release on April 26, 2024 by Lionsgate and produced by Kingdom Story Company and Candy Rock Entertainment, a production company headed by Candace Cameron Bure who also acts in the movie.

The film was directed by Joel Smallbone, making his directorial debut and written by Joel and Richard Ramsey. The cast includes Jonathan Jackson, Bure, Kirrilee Berger, Lucas Black, Terry O'Quinn, and Hillary Scott, a singer. The producers are Justin Tolley, Josh Walsh, and Luke Smallbone.

== Release ==
The film was released in the United States on April 26, 2024. It was scheduled to be released in Australia on May 30, coinciding with For King & Country's "Homecoming" musical tour through Australia and New Zealand. In the lead up to the film, For King & Country released an updated version of "Place in this World," featuring Michael W. Smith, who originally released the song in 1991.

== Reception ==
=== Box office ===
As of 23 June 2024, Unsung Hero was still in wide release; in the United States and Canada, it grossed $21.1 million at the box office against a production budget of $6.0 million. For the first three weeks of its run it was in the Top 10 at the domestic box office, peaking at No. 2 in the first week.

=== Critical response ===
On the review aggregator website Rotten Tomatoes, 61% of 33 critics' reviews are positive with an average rating of 6.1/10. The website's consensus reads: Unsung Hero presents a heartwarming dramatization of its fact-based story that's just uplifting enough to make up for its tepid approach to real-life drama. Metacritic, which uses a weighted average, assigned the film a score of 46 out of 100, based on 5 critics, indicating "mixed or average" reviews. Audiences polled by CinemaScore gave the film an average grade of "A+" on an A+ to F scale, while those polled by PostTrak gave it a 96% overall positive score with 90% saying they would definitely recommend it.

== Awards and nominations ==
Award	Date of ceremony	Recipients	Result
Dove Awards	2024	Inspirational Film of the Year	Won
Movieguide Awards	March 6, 2025	Best Movie for Mature Audiences	Nominated
