= ALIVE in Florida =

aLIVE in Florida

Live album by Rebecca St. James
- Released: March 20, 2007
- Genres: Contemporary Christian music, Christian rock
- Length: 1:00:35
- Label: ForeFront
- Producer: Joel Smallbone

Rebecca St. James chronology
| If I Had One Chance to Tell You Something (2005) | aLIVE in Florida (2007) | I Will Praise You (2011) |

Professional ratings
Review scores
| Source | Rating |
|---|---|
| Jesus Freak Hideout | (not rated) |

aLIVE in Florida is the second live album by Rebecca St. James. It was released on March 20, 2007 as a CD/DVD combination, and features live versions of fan favorites.

== Track listing ==
1. "Intro" - 0:31
2. "God Help Me" - 3:17
3. "Lamb of God" - 5:06
4. "Wait For Me" - 3:08
5. "You Are Loved" (acoustic) - 4:31
6. "Beautiful Stranger" - 3:29
7. "Reborn" - 4:06
8. "Thank You" (with Joel) - 4:42
9. "Without Love" (performed by Joel & Luke) - 3:12
10. "Lion" - 3:53
11. "Take All of Me" - 7:45
12. "Blessed Be Your Name" - 4:30
13. "Forgive Me" - 4:02
14. "Alive" - 2:58
15. "You Are Loved (hisboyelroy's funk house mix)" bonus studio track - 5:34

== DVD ==
Track listing:

1. "Intro" - 0:53
2. "God Help Me" - 2:54
3. "Lamb of God" - 7:00
4. "Wait For Me" - 7:56
5. "You Are Loved (Acoustic)" - 4:32
6. "Beautiful Stranger" - 3:32
7. "Compassion International Talk" - 6:45
8. "Reborn" - 4:07
9. "Thank You" (with Joel) - 4:43
10. "Without Love" (performed by Joel & Luke) - 3:08
11. "Take All of Me" - 7:18
12. "Blessed Be Your Name" - 13:08
13. "Forgive Me" - 9:38
14. "Alive" - 3:09
15. "Blessed Be Your Name (Reprise)" - 2:56
16. "God Help Me Concept Video"
17. "Forgive Me Concept Video"
18. "Compassion International Video"

== Personnel ==
- Rebecca St. James – lead vocals
- Fred Williams – keyboards, acoustic piano
- Gregory Everett – guitars
- Scott Murray – guitars
- Dave Childress – bass
- Kevin Holvig – drums
- Joel Smallbone – backing vocals, lead vocals (8, 9)
- Luke Smallbone – backing vocals, lead vocals (9)
- Libby Smallbone – backing vocals

=== Production ===
- David Smallbone – executive producer
- Joel Smallbone – producer
- Ainslie Grosser – recording, mixing
- Richard Dodd – mastering
- Jess Chambers – A&R administration
- Jan Cook – creative director
- Tim Frank – art direction
- Bethany Newman – design
- Ben Beaden – photography
- Smallbone Management – management

DVD credits

- Eric Welch – film director
- Kristin Kierne – film producer
- Ben Smallbone – post production director, post production editing
- Joel Smallbone – post production producer, post production editing assistant
