= Rebecca St. James =

Australian singer (born 1977)

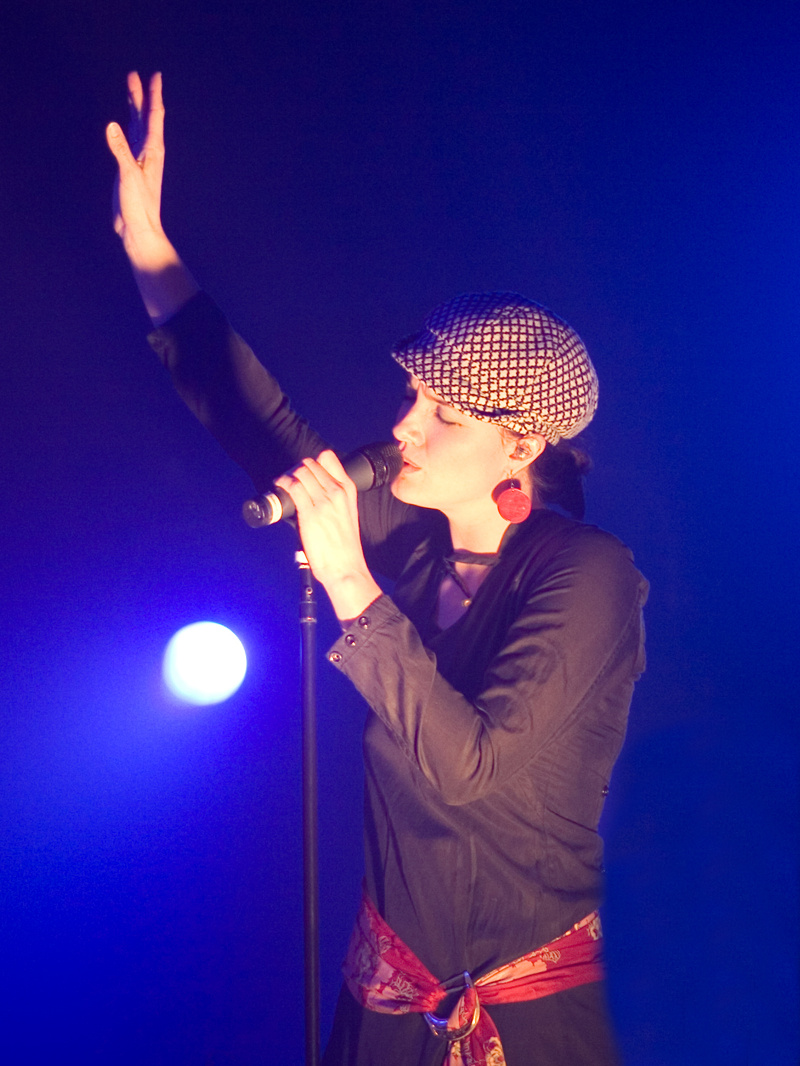
- St. James performing in Altus west of Lawton, Oklahoma in 2007

Background information
- Also known as: Rebecca Jean
- Born: Rebecca Jean Smallbone; 26 July 1977 (age 49); Sydney, Australia
- Genres: CCM; Christian rock
- Occupations: Singer; songwriter; author; actress
- Years active: 1987–present
- Labels: DTS; ForeFront; Beach Street/Reunion; Heritage
- Spouse: Jacob Fink (m. 2011)

Rebecca Jean Fink (née Smallbone; born 26 July 1977), known professionally as Rebecca Jean or Rebecca St. James, is an Australian contemporary Christian singer and actress. She began performing in Australia in the late 1980s and released her first full-length studio album in 1991. She was signed to ForeFront Records in 1993, releasing her major label debut the next year.

St. James rose to fame in the late 1990s with her RIAA certified Gold albums God and Pray, the latter of which won a Grammy Award in 1999 for Best Rock Gospel Album, and her holiday album Christmas. The albums spawned multiple singles, including "God", "Go and Sin No More", and "Pray". Since then she has established herself as one of the most prominent musical artists in Contemporary Christian music (CCM), with five additional full-length studio albums: Transform, Worship God, If I Had One Chance to Tell You Something, I Will Praise You, and Kingdom Come. Staple songs such as "Wait for Me", "Reborn", "Song of Love", "Alive", "Shine Your Glory Down", and "Battle Is the Lord's" have all been derived from these releases. She has earned nine No. 1 hits on Christian radio and has sold nearly two million albums since starting her career.

St. James has written over a dozen published books, narrated a documentary, and acted in nine films (including lead roles in Sarah's Choice and A Strange Brand of Happy), a musical stage show, and a VeggieTales episode ("An Easter Carol"). She is also an outspoken sexual abstinence and pro-life advocate, a spokesperson for Compassion International, the sister of Joel and Luke Smallbone who are the band For King & Country, and the wife of Foster the People's former bassist Jacob "Cubbie" Fink.

Her story is told in the film Unsung Hero released in 2024.

== Early life ==
Rebecca St. James was born Rebecca Jean Smallbone on 26 July 1977 in Wahroonga, Sydney to parents David and Helen Smallbone. In a 2004 interview she identified early Christian rock and metal acts such as Stryper, White Heart, and Petra as significant influences on her musical roots. She described herself as a "total rock chick at heart".

She moved to the United States in 1991 together with her family.

== Career ==
=== Musical beginnings (1990–1995) ===
In 1990, at age 12, St. James opened shows for fellow CCM artist Carman during his Australian tour. The next year she did an independent album, Refresh My Heart, in Australia under the stage name "Rebecca Jean". Soon after its release, her family moved to Nashville, Tennessee, United States, in 1991, where her father received a job offer. She and her family were in dire financial straits, but they were supported by neighbours who brought them food and their neighbourhood Baptist church which gave them furniture after learning they were sleeping on the floor. In 1993, after singing at First Baptist Church of Franklin in Franklin, Tennessee (now Church of the City), she signed with ForeFront Records and took her stage name at the label's request. In 1994 she released her major label debut: Rebecca St. James. She also released the Rebecca St. James: Extended Play Remixes EP in 1995.

=== God, Christmas, and Pray (1996–1999) ===
On 25 June 1996, St. James released her third studio album God, led by the title track. The album took her music in a new direction, focusing more on rock. It debuted to positive reviews and debuted at 200, and peaked at 168 on the Billboard 200. It also charted at No. 10 on the Billboard Heatseekers chart and No. 6 on Billboard's Contemporary Christian chart. In 1997, she was nominated for a Grammy Award for Best Rock Gospel Album for God and in 2005 the album was RIAA certified gold for selling over 500,000 copies. To promote the album, St. James released a devotion book, 40 Days with God: A Devotional Journey, in 1996.

In 1997, St. James released the sequel to her devotional book: You're the Voice: 40 More Days with God. On October 7 of the same year, she released her fourth studio album and first holiday album, Christmas. The album charted at No. 12 on Billboard's Top Heatseekers chart and No. 14 on the Top Contemporary Christian chart.

On 20 October 1998, St. James released her fifth studio album, Pray, which debuted to mixed reviews. The album managed to chart at No. 168 on the Billboard 200, and No. 5 on both the Heatseekers Chart and the Contemporary Christian Chart. The album won a Grammy in 1999 for Best Rock/Gospel Album, and, in 2006, it was RIAA-certified gold for selling over 500,000 copies. Also in 1998, St. James contributed to the CCM compilation album Surfonic Water Revival with the song "Gold Coast".

In 1999, St. James released "Yes, I Believe In God" to radio only, in memory of the lives lost at the Columbine shooting. The song was later released on the album Wait for Me: The Best from Rebecca St. James. Also in 1999, St. James released a video on VHS, No Secrets, featuring interviews of her and her family, behind-the-scenes footage and the music video for the song "Pray". In addition to her own projects, St. James took part in a CD release, Heaven & Earth: A Tapestry of Worship, which featured female Christian artists such as Nichole Nordeman and Jennifer Knapp. The album was released in November 1999 and features two songs by St. James; "As We Wait" and "River of Life". She also contributed a remix of her song "Omega" to the CCM compilation Listen:Louder.

=== Transform, Worship God and Live Worship: Blessed Be Your Name (2000–2004) ===
In June 2000, St. James released a cover of the song "Shout to the Lord" on the CCM compilation album Eterne: Never Be the Same. The song was later made available on St. James' live record, Live Worship: Blessed Be Your Name, as an embedded hidden track.

On 24 October 2000, St. James released her sixth studio album, Transform. The album charted at No. 166 on the Billboard 200, No. 7 on the Heatseekers Chart, and No. 14 on the Contemporary Christian Chart. The album garnered positive reviews and featured the songs "Wait for Me" and "Reborn". Also in 2000, St. James made a cameo in the film Left Behind: The Movie. A year later, the devotional book, 40 Days with God was re-released with a new layout and five new devotions. Also in 2001, St. James contributed to the CCM compilation album The Prayer of a Jabez with the song "Lead Me Away", which is a duet with Michael Tait.

In 2002, to promote the single "Wait For Me" from Transform, St. James released the book Wait for Me: Rediscovering the Joy of Purity in Romance, which went on to sell over 100,000 copies and spawn a journal and study guide. The song and book promotes sexual abstinence before marriage, and St. James has since become a major spokesperson for the subject.

On 12 February 2002, St. James released a cover of the Keith Green song "Your Love Broke Through" on the compilation album Your Love Broke Through: The Worship Songs Of Keith Green. The song is a duet with Phil Keaggy. Two weeks later, on 26 February 2002, St. James released her seventh studio album, Worship God. The album debuted to extremely positive reviews and charted at No. 94 on the Billboard 200, marking St. James' first Top 100 album, and No. 5 on the Contemporary Christian chart. She released a DVD to promote the album 19 November 2002, that featured music videos, interviews, etc.

On 25 March 2003, after 10 years with ForeFront Records, St. James released her first compilation project, Wait for Me: The Best from Rebecca St. James, which features 16 of her most popular songs and two new ones, including "I Thank You" which managed to peak at No. 2 on Billboard's Hot Christian Songs chart. The album failed to make the Billboard 200, but charted at No. 16 on the Contemporary Christian chart.

On 24 February 2004, St. James released her first live album, Live Worship: Blessed Be Your Name, which included seven live songs and two studio-recorded songs. The album peaked at No. 187 on the Billboard 200 and No. 12 on the Top Christian Albums chart. Later that year, St. James released a compilation album, The Best of Rebecca St. James, and her book SHE: Safe, Healthy, Empowered: The Woman You're Made to Be. Also in 2004, St. James starred in the stage musical !Hero as a modern day Mary Magdalene (as Maggie). St. James later lent her voice to the VeggieTales episode "An Easter Carol" as Hope the Music Box Angel. She also took part in a pop/rock VeggieTales album, Veggie Rocks! and covered "The VeggieTales Theme Song" for the album. The same year, St. James appeared as a guest vocalist on records by Dennis Jernigan and Newsboys. She co-performed the songs "Faithful Friend" and "Blessed Be Your Name", respectively.

=== If I Had One Chance to Tell You Something, film debut, and aLIVE in Florida (2005–2010) ===
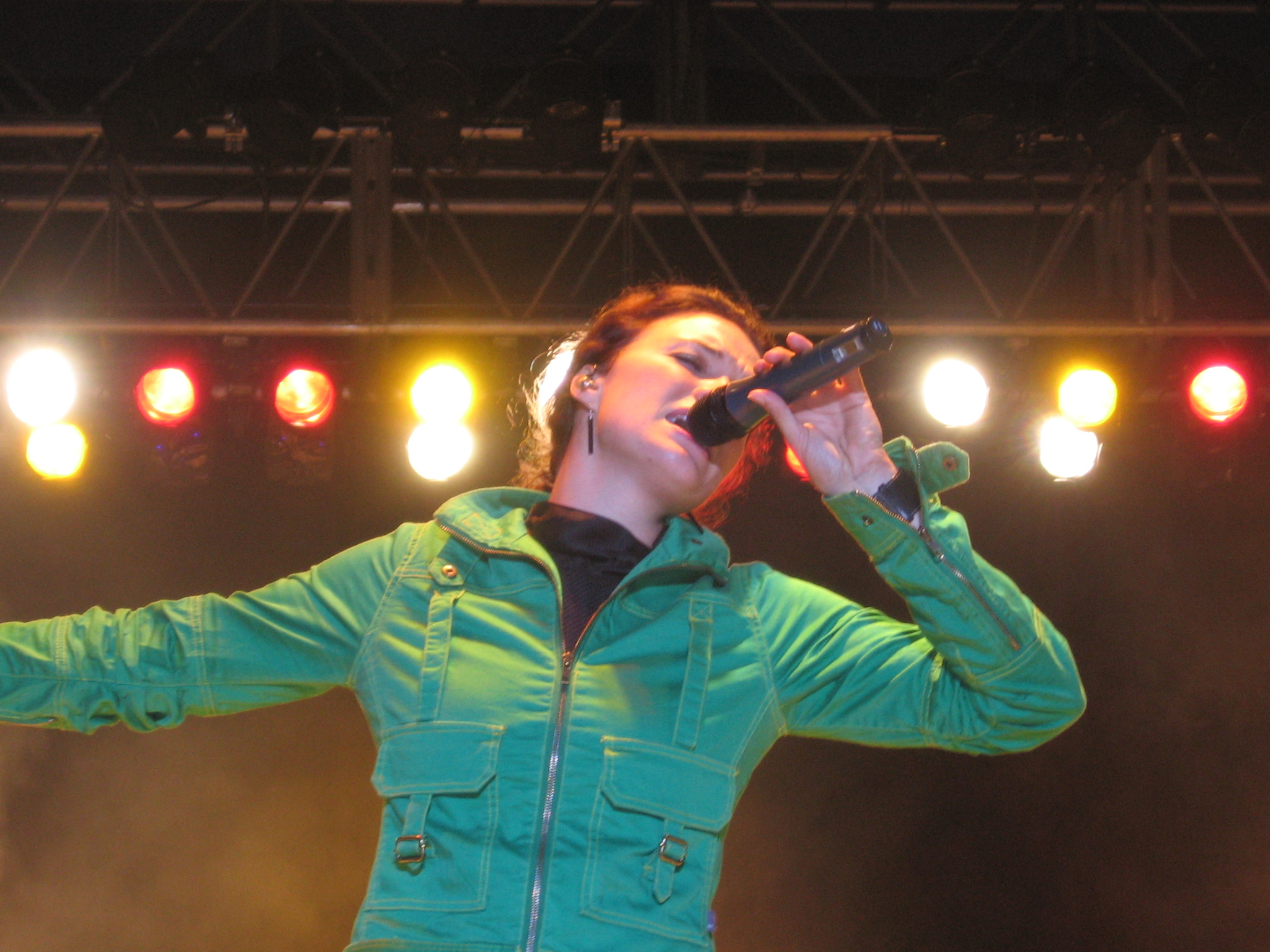
Rebecca St. James performing at the Higher Ground Music Festival in August 2005

After taking a hiatus from recording music, St. James returned to the studio in early 2005 to record new songs. On October 24, 2005, the first single from the album, "Alive", was released. The song managed to chart at No. 3 on R&R's CHR Chart and No. 13 on Billboards Hot Christian Songs Chart. Her eighth studio album, If I Had One Chance to Tell You Something, was released on 22 November 2005. The album debuted to fairly positive reviews. It charted at No. 14 on Billboard's Top Christian Albums Chart, but failed to make the Billboard 200.

On 1 July 2005, St. James released a Teen Edition of her book, SHE and on 1 October 2005, she released another book: Sister Freaks: Stories of Women Who Gave Up Everything For God. Also in 2005, St. James contributed a song, "Lion", to the album Music Inspired by The Chronicles of Narnia: The Lion, the Witch and the Wardrobe, and released a cover of the Christmas carol "Hark! The Herald Angels Sing".

In early 2006, St. James embarked on her If I Had One Chance To Tell You Something Tour with fellow Christian group BarlowGirl. She also recorded "America", the theme song for the National Day of Prayer, co-written by singer/songwriter Phil Laeger. It was released to iTunes on 2 May 2006. She also recorded a cover of Chris Tomlin's song "Forever" for the album WOW Worship: Aqua. In the same year, ForeFront Records put together a compilation album, The Early Years, that covered ten songs from her earliest releases: Rebecca St. James, GOD and Pray. Aside from music, St. James made her major character film debut in Unidentified as Colleen in 2006.

In 2007, ForeFront Records took live footage and recordings from the If I Had One Chance... Tour and released aLIVE in Florida, a CD/DVD collection on 20 March. The album features 14 live songs and an exclusive remix of "You Are Loved". The album charted at No. 43 on Billboard's Top Christian Albums Chart. At the time of the album's release, it was announced that St. James has sold over 1.8 million albums to date.

In the midst of a musical hiatus, ForeFront Records put together a two-disc compilation album, The Ultimate Collection, which was released 11 March 2008. Another compilation, Greatest Hits, was released later that year on 18 October 2008. On 3 September 2008, St. James released another book: Pure: A 90-Day Devotional for the Mind, Body, & Spirit. In late 2008, St. James announced she would star as the lead role in Sarah's Choice, a film that was released to DVD on 17 November 2009. It includes "Little One", a song by St. James. The song was released almost two years later on 2 September 2011. The film received good reviews from Christian movie critics.

Although on musical hiatus, on 16 April 2009, St. James released "You're Alive" to iTunes as an advance single for her Resurrection Worship: Songs of Hope album. Then, in June 2009, she released "Wish" to her MySpace page. Aside from these brief musical endeavours, St. James' book Loved: Stories of Forgiveness was released on 1 September 2009. On 19 August 2009, Christian Cinema reported that St. James had wrapped up filming a new film, Rising Stars, which was released on 22 October 2010. On 19 October 2010, St. James released her version of "O Little Town of Bethlehem" on the album The Essential Christmas Collection.

=== I Will Praise You, continued film career, and first novels (2011–2016) ===
On 18 November 2010, St. James announced that she had parted ways with ForeFront Records and would be releasing a new worship album in April 2011 via Beach Street/Reunion Records. Her ninth studio album, I Will Praise You, was released on 5 April 2011. It was preceded by the single "Shine Your Glory Down", which was released to Christian radio on 11 February. The album was met with positive reviews from Christian music critics and was highly successful, debuting at No. 18 on Billboard's Hot Christian Albums chart and later peaking at No. 9. It also peaked at No. 153 on the Billboard 200, her highest charting effort after Worship God. Her ninth book, What Is He Thinking?, hit shelves on 26 September 2011.

St. James continued her film career in 2011 with Suing the Devil. The Frontier Boys followed in 2012. St. James starred in A Strange Brand of Happy, a romantic comedy film that was released on 13 September 2013. The film revolves around Joyce, a single Christian life coach who falls for an agnostic client. It began filming on 15 August 2011 in Cincinnati, and was released on 13 September 2013.

On 12 March 2013, St. James announced via Facebook that she was publishing The Merciful Scar, her first Christian novel, co-authored with Nancy Rue. It was released on 10 September 2013. She also narrated the documentary Mother India: Life Through the Eyes of the Orphan, which was released on 23 April 2013. ForeFront Records released a compilation album on 7 January 2014. The CD was released as Icon, while the iTunes Store version was released as Best of Rebecca St. James. Her second novel, Sarah's Choice, an adaptation of the 2009 film of the same name in which St. James starred, was released on 27 May 2014, while her third novel, One Last Thing, was released on 10 March 2015. Both books were co-authored by Nancy Rue.

St. James' film career continued into 2015 with Faith of Our Fathers, which featured St. James portraying a car-stealing Australian hitchhiker. She also made a brief cameo in the 2016 film Priceless, which was written, produced, and edited by her brother Joel Smallbone, who starred in the film.

=== Return to touring, Dawn, and Kingdom Come (2017–present) ===
After several years of musical hiatus, St. James recorded and released a cover of "Amazing Grace", with her brothers Joel and Luke Smallbone of the band For King & Country. The song was released in October 2017. She also toured with for King & Country and Casting Crowns on a Christmas tour, and released a live duet with for King & Country of their song "The Proof of Your Love". St. James later joined the "Greatest Hits Live" tour from November 2018 and continued through May 2019 with Point of Grace, Avalon, Nicole C. Mullen, Bob Carlisle, and NewSong.

On 10 January 2019, St. James announced that she was writing music for a new album with frequent collaborator Tedd T. and that she had signed with Heritage Music Group, an imprint of Bethel Music. On 29 April 2020, St. James announced via Facebook live that her new album would be titled Dawn, although she later clarified in an Instagram post that Dawn would be an EP rather than a full-length record. The EP's first single, "Battle Is the Lord's", was released on 12 June 2020 and features guest artist Brandon Lake. Dawn was released on 24 July 2020. On 28 August 2020, St. James was featured on the acoustic version of For King & Country's single "Together", which also featured Cory Asbury.

On 22 October 2021, St. James released the single "Kingdom Come" featuring her brothers, For King & Country. The song is the lead single from her tenth studio album, Kingdom Come, which was released on 25 March 2022. The second single from the album, "Praise", was released on 18 February 2022.

Unsung Hero, a film based on the lives of St. James and her family, was released via Lionsgate in April 2024. St. James made a brief cameo in the film as a flight attendant. The film grossed $21.2 million at the global box office. She contributed two songs to the film’s soundtrack, both collaborations with For King & Country. On 4 February 2025, St. James released a new book titled Lasting Ever: Faith, Music, Family, and Being Found by True Love. The book is co-authored with her husband, Cubbie Fink. On 9 May 2025, St. James released a new version of her song "You Make Everything Beautiful" with featured vocals from her daughters Gemma and Imogen.

== Personal life ==
At age 19, she became a member of the City Church of Franklin (formerly known as the First Baptist Church of Franklin). Two of her brothers, Joel and Luke Smallbone, began the band For King & Country in 2007.

On 3 January 2011, she announced her engagement to Foster the People's former bassist Jacob "Cubbie" Fink, a Colorado native and a missionary to South Africa. Fink proposed on Christmas Day 2010 at St. James' family's farm in Franklin. They married on 23 April 2011, at the Junípero Serra Museum in San Diego, California. On 4 October 2013, St. James announced that they were expecting their first child and on 18 February 2014, she gave birth to their daughter Gemma Elena Fink. St. James and Fink's second daughter, Imogen Watson Fink, was born on 11 May 2018. St. James announced on 29 April 2020 that she was 21 weeks pregnant with her third child. In August 2020, St. James had a son, River Jack.

== Awards ==
- 2000: Grammy Award for Best Rock Gospel Album – Pray
- 2002: GMA Dove Award for Special Event Album of the Year – Prayer of Jabez
- 2004: GMA Dove Award for Special Event Album of the Year – !Hero
- 2006: GMA Dove Award for Special Event Album of the Year – Music Inspired by The Chronicles of Narnia: The Lion, the Witch and the Wardrobe

== Discography ==
- 1991: Refresh My Heart
- 1994: Rebecca St. James
- 1996: God
- 1997: Christmas
- 1998: Pray
- 2000: Transform
- 2002: Worship God
- 2005: If I Had One Chance to Tell You Something
- 2011: I Will Praise You
- 2022: Kingdom Come

== Bibliography ==
Year	Title	ISBN
1996/2001 (re-issue)	40 Days with God: A Devotional Journey	ISBN 0-7847-0569-0, ISBN 0-7847-1274-3
1997	You're the Voice: 40 More Days with God – The Devotional Journey Continues	ISBN 0-7852-7139-2
2002/2008 (re-issue)	Wait For Me: Rediscovering the Joy of Purity in Romance	ISBN 0-7852-7127-9
2003	Wait For Me Journal: Thoughts For My Future Husband	ISBN 0785263969
2004	SHE: Safe, Healthy, Empowered — The Woman You're Made To Be	ISBN 1-4143-0026-3
2005	SHE Teen: Safe, Healthy, Empowered, co-authored with Lynda Hunter Bjorklund	ISBN 1-4143-0028-X
2005	Wait For Me Study Guide: Discover the Power of Purity	ISBN 1418501956
2005	Sister Freaks: Stories of Women Who Gave Up Everything for God	ISBN 0-446-69560-2
2008	Pure: A 90-Day Devotional for the Mind, the Body & the Spirit	ISBN 0-446-50041-0
2009	Loved: Stories of Forgiveness	ISBN 978-0446558174
2011	What Is He Thinking?: What Guys Want Us to Know About Dating, Love, and Marriage	ISBN 0-446-57267-5
2013	The Merciful Scar, co-authored with Nancy Rue	ISBN 1401689221
2014	Sarah's Choice, co-authored with Nancy Rue	ISBN 1401689248
2015	One Last Thing, co-authored with Nancy Rue	ISBN 9781401689261
2025	Lasting Ever: Faith, Music, Family, and Being Found by True Love, co-authored with Cubbie Fink	ISBN 0830787852

== Filmography ==
Year	Title	Role
2000	Left Behind: The Movie	Camera Coordinator for GNN
2001	The First Easter	Mary Magdalene (voice)
2004	VeggieTales: "An Easter Carol"	Hope, the Music Box Angel (voice)
2004	!Hero	Maggie
2006	Unidentified	Colleen
2009	Sarah's Choice	Sarah Collins
2010	Rising Stars	Kari
2011	The Frontier Boys	Judy Bracken
2011	Suing the Devil	Jasmine Williams
2013	Mother India: Life Through the Eyes of the Orphan	Narrator
2013	A Strange Brand of Happy	Joyce Heller
2015	Faith of Our Fathers	Annie
2016	Priceless	Cameo
2024	Unsung Hero	Flight Attendant
