= ForeFront Records =

American Christian record label

- Parent company: Universal Music Group
- Founded: 1987
- Founder: Eddie DeGarmo, Dan R. Brock, Dana Key, Ron Griffin
- Distributor: Capitol Christian Music Group
- Genre: Contemporary Christian music, Christian rock
- Country of origin: United States
- Official website: forefrontrecords.com

ForeFront Records is a contemporary Christian music and Christian rock record label founded in 1987 by Dan R. Brock, Eddie DeGarmo, Dana Key, and Ron W. Griffin. It was purchased by EMI in 1996 from Dan R. Brock and Eddie DeGarmo, and is a division of Universal Music Group under Capitol Christian Music Group.

In 1998, ForeFront released Ten: The Birthday Album, a two-CD compilation to celebrate their 10th anniversary that featured songs from several of their artists at the time with several song remakes of older songs performed by new bands.

== Artists ==
=== Current ===
TobyMac (also with Sparrow Records and Capitol CMG)

=== Former ===
- Abandon (active, currently independent)
- Audio Adrenaline (also on Fair Trade Services) (disbanded)
- The Benjamin Gate (disbanded)
- Big Tent Revival (independent)
- Bleach (currently independent)
- Clear (disbanded)
- Code of Ethics (disbanded)
- Considering Lily (inactive)
- DeGarmo and Key (inactive)
- dc Talk (disbanded)
- Dizmas (hiatus)
- Eddie DeGarmo (inactive)
- End Time Warriors (E.T.W.) (inactive)
- Mark Farner (active)
- Grammatrain (inactive)
- Guardian (currently independent)
- Holy Soldier (inactive)
- Larry Howard
- Iona (active, on Open Sky Records)
- Karthi
- Kevin Max (active, currently independent)
- Dana Key (deceased)
- Lil iROCC (active, with Jus Rock Records)
- Geoff Moore (inactive, with Rocketown Records)
- The Normals (disbanded)
- PAX217 (disbanded)
- Philmont (disbanded)
- Raze (disbanded)
- Rebecca St. James (active, with Beach Street/Reunion Records)
- Satellite Soul (active, new single STATIC released in 2020)
- Serene and Pearl (changed name to Considering Lily, currently inactive)
- Seven Day Jesus (disbanded)
- Skillet (active, formerly on Ardent Records / formerly on Atlantic Records, independent)
- Smalltown Poets (active, currently independent)
- Pete Stewart (active)
- Stacie Orrico (hiatus, currently independent/ (Red Light Management)
- TAIT (hiatus)
- This Beautiful Republic (disbanded)

== See also ==
- List of Christian record labels
