= Audio Adrenaline discography =

- Studio albums: 10
- EPs: 1
- Live albums: 2
- Compilation albums: 5
- Singles: 53
- Video albums: 6
- Music videos: 16

The discography of American Christian rock band Audio Adrenaline consists of 2 A-180 tapes, 10 studio albums, 2 live albums, 1 EP, 6 long-form videos, 5 compilations, 53 singles and 16 music videos.

== Albums ==
=== Tapes (A-180) ===
Title	Details
You Turn	Released: 1989; Label: Landmark; Formats: Cassette
Reaper's Train	Released: 1990; Label: Landmark; Formats: cassette

=== Studio albums ===
Title	Details	Peak chart positions			Certifications	Sales
Title	Details	US	US Christ.	US Rock	Certifications	Sales
Audio Adrenaline	Released: April 17, 1992; Label: ForeFront; Formats: CD, cassette, digital download, streaming	—	—	—		US: 75,000
Don't Censor Me	Released; October 1, 1993; Label: ForeFront; Formats: CD, cassette, digital download, streaming	—	11	—		US: 250,000
Bloom	Released: February 20, 1996; Label: ForeFront; Formats: CD, LP, cassette, digital download, streaming	77	2	—	RIAA: Gold	
Some Kind of Zombie	Released: November 18, 1997; Label: ForeFront; Formats: CD, LP, cassette, digital download, streaming	99	5	—		
Underdog	Released: September 14, 1999; Label: ForeFront; Formats: CD, LP, cassette, digital download, streaming	76	1	—		
Lift	Released: November 20, 2001; Label: ForeFront; Formats: CD, cassette, digital download, streaming	169	12	—		
Worldwide	Released: February 25, 2003; Label: ForeFront; Formats: CD, digital download, streaming	116	4	—		
Until My Heart Caves In	Released: August 30, 2005; Label: ForeFront; Formats: CD, digital download, streaming	122	5	—		
Kings and Queens	Released: March 12, 2013; Label: Fair Trade; Formats: CD, LP, digital download, streaming	70	4	19		
Sound of the Saints	Released; May 5, 2015; Label: Fair Trade; Formats: CD, digital download, streaming	69	1	8		
"—" denotes a recording that did not chart or was not released in that territory.

=== Live albums ===
Title	Details
Live Bootleg	Released: October 10, 1995; Label: ForeFront; Formats: CD, cassette, digital download, streaming
Live from Hawaii: The Farewell Concert	Released: August 28, 2007; Label: ForeFront; Formats: CD, DVD, digital download, streaming

=== Compilations ===
Title	Details
Hit Parade	Released: March 13, 2001; Label: ForeFront; Formats: CD, digital download, streaming
Adios: The Greatest Hits	Released: August 1, 2006; Label: ForeFront; Formats: CD, digital download, streaming
Greatest Hits	Released: 2008; Label: ForeFront/EMD; Formats: CD, digital download, streaming
The Ultimate Collection	Released: 2009; Label: Chordant; Formats: CD, digital download, streaming
Big House to Ocean Floor	Released: 2013; Label: ForeFront; Formats: CD, digital download, streaming

=== Extended plays ===
Title	Details
Don't Censor Me: Extended Play Remixes	Released: 1994; Label: ForeFront; Formats: CD, digital download, streaming

== Videography ==
=== Video albums ===
Year	Album title	Record label
1995	Big House	ForeFront
2001	Audio Goes Video	ForeFront
2002	Lift DVD	ForeFront
2003	Alive DVD	ForeFront
2006	Adios: The Greatest Hits (Special Edition CD/DVD)	ForeFront
2007	Live From Hawaii: The Farewell Concert CD/DVD	ForeFront

=== Music videos ===
Year	Title	Album	Reference
1992	"PDA"	Audio Adrenaline	
1993	"AKA Public School"	Don't Censor Me	
1994	"Big House"	Don't Censor Me	
1994	"We're a Band"	Don't Censor Me	
1996	"Never Gonna Be As Big As Jesus"	Bloom	
1996	"Free Ride"	Bloom	
1997	"Some Kind of Zombie"	Some Kind of Zombie	
1998	"Blitz" (featuring The O.C. Supertones)	Some Kind of Zombie	
1999	"Get Down"	Underdog	
2000	"Hands and Feet"	Underdog	
2001	"Ocean Floor"	Lift	
2002	"Rejoice"	Lift	
2003	"Church Punks" (live)	Worldwide	
2003	"Leaving 99" (live)	Worldwide	
2012	"Kings & Queens"	Kings & Queens	
2013	"Believer"	Kings & Queens	

== Singles ==
Year	Single	Christian peak chart positions							Album
Year	Single	Christian	Airplay	Inspo	AC	CHR	Rock	Metal	Album
1991	"My God"	—	—	—	—	—	—	5	Audio Adrenaline
1992	"Who Do You Love?"	—	—	—	—	13	—	—	Audio Adrenaline
1992	"Audio World"	—	—	—	—	16	—	—	Audio Adrenaline
1994	"My World View" (featuring Kevin Max of dc Talk)	—	—	—	33	3	—	—	Don't Censor Me
1994	"We're a Band"	—	—	—	—	—	3	—	Don't Censor Me
1994	"Big House"	—	—	—	—	1	14	—	Don't Censor Me
1994	"Can't Take God Away	—	—	—	—	1	—	—	Don't Censor Me
1994	"Rest Easy"	—	—	—	—	10	—	—	Don't Censor Me
1994	"Don't Censor Me"	—	—	—	—	—	18	—	Don't Censor Me
1995	"A.K.A. Public School"	—	—	—	—	14	—	—	Don't Censor Me
1995	"Righteous Rocker #3"	—	—	—	—	—	1	—	One Way: The Songs of Larry Norman
1996	"Taste and See"	—	—	—	—	—	—	—	Never Say Dinosaur (Petra tribute album)
1996	"Never Gonna Be as Big as Jesus"	—	—	—	—	3	—	—	Bloom
1996	"Secret"	—	—	—	—	—	1	—	Bloom
1996	"Walk on Water"	—	—	—	38	1	—	—	Bloom
1996	"I'm Not the King"	—	—	—	—	—	1	—	Bloom
1996	"Good People"	—	—	—	—	3	—	—	Bloom
1997	"Free Ride"	—	—	—	—	9	2	—	Bloom
1997	"Man of God"	—	—	—	—	2	—	—	Bloom
1997	"Some Kind of Zombie"	—	—	—	—	—	1	—	Some Kind of Zombie
1997	"People Like Me"	—	—	—	—	1	4	—	Some Kind of Zombie
1998	"Blitz"	—	—	—	—	25	1	—	Some Kind of Zombie
1998	"Chevette"	—	—	—	—	5	1	—	Some Kind of Zombie
1998	"God-Shaped Hole"	—	—	—	—	17	—	—	Some Kind of Zombie
1999	"New Body"	—	—	—	—	11	2	—	Some Kind of Zombie
1999	"Get Down"	—	—	—	—	1	7	—	Underdog
1999	"Hands and Feet"	—	—	—	7	1	6	—	Underdog
2000	"Underdog"	—	—	—	—	—	5	—	Underdog
2000	"Good Life"	—	—	—	—	3	—	—	Underdog
2001	"Mighty Good Leader"	—	—	—	—	—	14	—	Underdog
2001	"One Like You"^{[A]}	—	—	—	—	2	—	—	Hit Parade
2001	"Will Not Fade"^{[A]}	—	—	—	—	—	2	—	Hit Parade
2001	"Beautiful"	—	—	—	—	1	—	—	Lift
2001	"Lonely Man"	—	—	—	—	—	1	—	Lift
2002	"Rejoice"	—	—	—	—	2	—	—	Lift
2003	"Dirty"/"Ocean Floor"	—	—	—	—	2	—	—	Worldwide
2003	"Pierced"	12	—	—	14	—	—	—	Worldwide
2003	"Church Punks"	—	—	—	—	—	9	—	Worldwide
2003	"Strong"	—	—	—	—	—	—	—	Worldwide
2003	"Worldwide"	—	—	—	—	—	30	—	Worldwide
2004	"Leaving 99"	5	—	—	3	1	—	—	Worldwide
2004	"Miracle"	—	—	—	—	9	—	—	Worldwide
2005	"Start a Fire"	—	—	—	—	—	—	—	Worldwide
2005	"King"	17	—	—	18	17	—	—	Until My Heart Caves In
2005	"Undefeated"	—	—	—	—	—	19	—	Until My Heart Caves In
2005	"Starting Over"	—	—	—	—	—	—	—	Until My Heart Caves In
2005	"Melody (Lost Inside the Wonder)"	—	—	—	—	—	—	—	Until My Heart Caves In
2006	"Goodbye"	—	—	—	—	29	—	—	Adios: The Greatest Hits
2012	"Kings & Queens"	4	—	11	7	4	—	—	Kings & Queens
2013	"Believer"	19	—	—	23	—	—	—	Kings & Queens
2013	"King of the Comebacks"	—	—	—	—	—	22	—	Kings & Queens
2014	"He Moves You Move"	—	49	—	—	22	—	—	Kings & Queens
2015	"Love Was Stronger"	—	33	—	—	—	—	—	Sound of the Saints
2015	"Move"	—	—	—	—	—	—	—	Sound of the Saints
"—" denotes singles that did not chart.

== Notes ==
- A "One Like You"/"Will Not Fade" was released as a double A-side single with "One Like You" geared towards CHR formats and "Will Not Fade" towards Rock formats.
