= Live from Hawaii: The Farewell Concert =

Live album by Audio Adrenaline
- Released: August 28, 2007
- Recorded: April 28, 2007
- Venue: Waikiki Shell, Honolulu, Hawaii
- Genre: Christian rock
- Length: 63:45
- Label: ForeFront
- Producer: Audio Adrenaline

Audio Adrenaline chronology
Adios: The Greatest Hits (2006)	Live from Hawaii: The Farewell Concert (2007)	Kings & Queens (2013)

Live from Hawaii: The Farewell Concert is the second and final live album from the Christian rock band Audio Adrenaline. The concert was recorded during the band's final presentation on April 28, 2007 at Waikiki Shell in Honolulu, Hawaii. It was released on August 28, 2007 by ForeFront Records.

The album includes many special moments during certain songs, one including Mark Stuart's father, and another including Logan Sekulow, of the Christian music talk show The Logan Show's, proposing to his girlfriend. Special features include behind-the-scenes looks and band interviews and stories. Guest appearance by MercyMe at the end.

== Reception ==
Professional ratings
Review scores
Source	Rating
Jesus Freak Hideout	4/5 stars

The album received favorable reviews from critics. John DiBiase, of Jesus Freak Hideout, gave it 4 stars out of 5. He criticized lead singer Mark Stuart's vocals qualifying them as "noticeably poor... due to Mark Stuart's vocal ailments. It's evident here as to why Stuart had to hang up the mic." However, DiBiase still praised the project overall calling it "a project that fans can embrace as the final 'hoorah' for one of Christian rock's finest."

== Accolades ==
The album received two nominations at the 39th GMA Dove Awards: Rock Album of the Year and Long Form Music Video of Year, winning the latter.

== Track listing ==
CD
No.	Title	Writer(s)	Original recording on	Length
1.	"Clap Your Hands"	Tyler Burkum, Ben Cissell, Bob Herdman, Will McGinniss, Mark Stuart	Until My Heart Caves In	1:59
2.	"Worldwide"	Burkum, Cissell, Herdman, McGinniss, Stuart	Worldwide	2:31
3.	"Mighty Good Leader"	Burkum, Cissell, Herdman, McGinniss, Stuart	Underdog	3:32
4.	"Big House"	Barry Blair, Derrick Bostrom, Herdman, Cris Kirkwood, Curt Kirkwood, McGinniss, Stuart	Don't Censor Me	6:00
5.	"Until My Heart Caves In"	Burkum, Cissell, Herdman, McGinniss, Stuart	Until My Heart Caves In	3:34
6.	"Mark's Powerful Last Hands and Feet Intro"		–	3:01
7.	"Hands and Feet"	Burkum, Herdman, McGinniss, Stuart	Underdog	4:39
8.	"Ocean Floor"	Burkum, Cissell, Herdman, McGinniss, Stuart	Lift	4:39
9.	"We're a Band" (featuring T-Bone)	Blair, Herdman, McGinniss, Stuart	Don't Censor Me	7:22
10.	"Beautiful"	Burkum, Cissell, Herdman, McGinniss, Stuart	Lift	6:10
11.	"Underdog"	Burkum, Cissell, Herdman, McGinniss, Stuart	Underdog	3:33
12.	"Get Down"	Burkum, Cissell, Herdman, McGinniss, Stuart	Underdog	4:12
13.	"King Intro"	Burkum, Cissell, Herdman, McGinniss, Stuart	-	2:07
14.	"King"	Burkum, Cissell, Herdman, McGinniss	Until My Heart Caves In	6:27
15.	"Goodbye"	Burkum, Cissell, Herdman, McGinniss	Adios	3:59
Total length:				63:45

=== DVD ===
1. "Clap Your Hands"
2. "Worldwide"
3. "Mighty Good Leader"
4. "Big House"
5. "Until My Heart Caves In"
6. "Hands and Feet"
7. "Ocean Floor"
8. "Leaving 99"
9. "We're A Band" (Featuring T-Bone)
10. "Beautiful"
11. "Underdog"
12. "Get Down"
13. "DC-10"
14. "King"
15. "Goodbye"

== Personnel ==
Audio Adrenaline

- Mark Stuart – lead vocals, percussion
- Tyler Burkum – keyboards, acoustic guitars, electric guitars, lead vocals
- Will McGinniss – bass
- Ben Cissell – drums, percussion

with:

- Brian Whitman – additional guitars, backing vocals
- T-Bone – guest rap on "We're a Band"

== Production ==
- Scott Brickell – executive producer
- Peter York – executive producer
- Audio Adrenaline – producers
- Mark McCallie – director (DVD)
- Dennis Starns – editing (DVD)
- Aaron Swihart – recording, mixing
- Dan Shike – CD mastering at Tone and Volume Mastering (Nashville, Tennessee)
- Jess Chambers – A&R administration
- Josh Byrd – production manager
- Lindsay Hammerbeck – photography
- Brian Whitman – photography
- Jan Cook – creative direction
- Annette Reischl – layout, design
- BrickHouse Entertainment – management
