= Bleach (disambiguation) =

Bleach is a chemical that removes color or whitens, generally a dilute solution of Sodium hypochlorite, referred to as "liquid bleach" or "chlorine bleach".

Bleach or Bleaching may also refer to:

== Music ==
- Bleach (American band), an American Christian rock group
  - Bleach (Bleach album), 1999
- Bleach (British band), a British shoegazing group active in the early 1990s
- Bleach (Japanese band), a Japanese all-girl punk group, known as Bleach03 in North America
- Bleach (Nirvana album), a 1989 album by Nirvana
- "Bleach" (song), by Brockhampton
- "Bleach", a song by Easyworld from This Is Where I Stand
- ”Bleach”, a song by Ellie Goulding from Brightest Blue
- “Bleach” a song by 5 Seconds Of Summer from 5SOS5
- "Bleach", by Suicideboys from Long Term Effects of Suffering, 2021
- Bleached, an American pop band
- Bleech, British alternative rock band founded 2009

== Processes or techniques ==
- Anal bleaching
- Rhodopsin bleaching, as part of the visual cycle
- Bleaching of wood pulp, whitening and lignin removal from wood pulp
- Coral bleaching, a pathological response of coral to environmental stresses
- Textile bleaching
- Skin whitening
- Hair bleaching
- Tooth bleaching
- Photobleaching

== Other ==
- Bleach (manga), a Japanese manga series
  - Bleach (TV series), the animated adaptation of the manga, released from 2004–2012
    - Bleach: Thousand-Year Blood War, the animated adaptation of the final arc of the manga, released from 2022–2026
  - Bleach (2018 film), a live-action film based on the manga
- Bleach (1998 film), a 1998 science-fiction short film
- Bleach, a 2002 film starring Adam Scott
