= Hit Parade (Audio Adrenaline album) =

Greatest hits album by Audio Adrenaline
- Released: March 13, 2001
- Recorded: Various
- Genre: Christian rock
- Length: 65:37
- Label: ForeFront

Audio Adrenaline chronology
| Underdog (1999) | Hit Parade (2001) | Lift (2001) |

Hit Parade is Audio Adrenaline's first greatest hits album. It features fifteen hits from the band's previous albums, plus two new songs: "Will Not Fade" and "One Like You".

== Reception ==
Professional ratings
Review scores
| Source | Rating |
|---|---|
| AllMusic | 3/5 stars |
| Jesus Freak Hideout | 4.5/5 stars |

The album received favorable reviews from critics with John DiBiase, of Jesus Freak Hideout, giving it 4.5 stars out of 5. DiBiase classified it as "one of the best and most solid collections" he has heard while calling the two new songs as "superb". Dacia Blodgett-Williams, of AllMusic, gave the album 3 stars out of 5, writing that "while no doubt original in many aspects, all of Audio Adrenaline's music on this particular album began to sound alike after several tracks." She also classified the song "Get Down" as "the best introduction to the group, and perhaps the most original in its sound."

== Track listing ==
| No. | Title | Writer(s) | Originally recorded on | Length |
|---|---|---|---|---|
| 1. | "Will Not Fade" | Tyler Burkum, Ben Cissell, Bob Herdman, Will McGinniss, Mark Stuart | - | 3:49 |
| 2. | "I'm Not the King" | Barry Blair, Herdman, McGinniss, Stuart | Bloom | 3:52 |
| 3. | "Mighty Good Leader" | Burkum, Cissell, Herdman, McGinniss, Stuart | Underdog | 3:13 |
| 4. | "Some Kind of Zombie" | Blair, Herdman, McGinniss, Stuart | Some Kind of Zombie | 4:44 |
| 5. | "Get Down" | Burkum, Cissell, Herdman, McGinniss, Stuart | Underdog | 3:15 |
| 6. | "Walk on Water" | Blair, Herdman, McGinniss, Stuart | Bloom | 3:50 |
| 7. | "Big House" | Blair, Derrick Bostrom, Herdman, Cris Kirkwood, Curt Kirkwood, McGinniss, Stuart | Don't Censor Me | 3:38 |
| 8. | "We're a Band" | Blair, Herdman, McGinniss, Stuart | Don't Censor Me | 3:59 |
| 9. | "Blitz" | Herdman, McGinniss, Stuart | Some Kind of Zombie | 4:13 |
| 10. | "Hands and Feet" | Burkum, Cissell, Herdman, McGinniss, Charlie Peacock, Stuart | Underdog | 4:07 |
| 11. | "Man of God" | Blair, Herdman, McGinniss, Stuart | Bloom | 4:18 |
| 12. | "Chevette" | Herdman, McGinniss, Mary Ann McSweeny, Stuart | Some Kind of Zombie | 4:17 |
| 13. | "Underdog" | Burkum, Herdman, McGinniss, Stuart | Underdog | 3:31 |
| 14. | "Never Gonna Be As Big As Jesus" | Blair, Herdman, McGinniss, Stuart | Bloom | 4:26 |
| 15. | "DC-10" | Blair, Herdman, McGinniss, Stuart | Underdog | 2:22 |
| 16. | "One Like You" | Burkum, Cissell, Herdman, McGinniss, Stuart | - | 3:20 |
| 17. | "Rest Easy" | Blair, Herdman, McGinniss, Stuart | Don't Censor Me | 4:44 |
| Total length: | | | | 65:27 |

== Personnel ==
Audio Adrenaline

- Mark Stuart – lead vocals
- Bob Herdman – keyboards guitars, vocals
- Tyler Burkum – guitars, vocals
- Will McGinniss – bass, vocals
- Ben Cissell – drums, percussion, vocals

== Production ==
- Greg Ham – executive producer
- Mark Nicholas – executive producer, A&R
- Audio Adrenaline – producers (1, 3, 5, 13, 15, 16)
- John Hampton – producer (2, 4, 6, 9, 11, 12, 14)
- Steve Griffith – producer (7, 8, 17)
- Charlie Peacock – producer (10)
- David Leonard – mixing (5, 10, 13)
- Shawn Andrews – digital editing
- Ted Jensen – mastering at Sterling Sound (New York, NY)
- Scott McDaniel – creative direction
- Kerri McKeehan-Stuart – photography
- Room 120 – art direction, design
- BrickHouse Entertainment – management
