= Know Hope Collective (album) =

Studio album by Know Hope Collective
- Released: March 1, 2011
- Genres: CCM; Christian rock; spoken word; worship
- Length: 41:04
- Label: Integrity/Provident
- Producers: Mark Stuart, Will McGinnis, Josh Heiner

Singles from Know Hope Collective
- 1. "Attention" Released: July 20, 2010; 2. "Build Us Back" Released: December 27, 2010

Know Hope Collective is the debut studio album by the Christian music project of the same name, fronted by former Audio Adrenaline members Mark Stuart and Will McGinniss. Initially scheduled for release on February 15, 2011, the album was delayed until March 1.

== Theme and musical style ==
The Know Hope Collective as a whole has been described by Stuart and McGinniss, as "an ever-changing group of musicians from a variety of backgrounds who come together to create worship music while sharing their unique experiences and testimonies." Stuart further elaborated it as being "driven from an emerging style of worship and a place of vulnerability. We go on a journey together through the good, bad and ugly to the redemptive side."

The album itself has been called "an intimate pairing of songs and spoken word that plumbs the depths of McGinniss and Stuart's chart-topping heyday and post-band revelations" in which "Stuart speaks far more now than he sings." Cross Rhythms has expressed the general theme as "part of a much wider presentation of story-telling and artistic expression, inspired by the vulnerability experienced in sharing an experience of life and of God's hand in it." According to Stuart, "This first project was birthed out of the failure I went through being a singer who lost his voice. But the next one might be on missional living, orphan care or clean water, whatever God is leading us to."

=== Style ===
The album's musical style has been labeled as a worship music, with the sound of the band in the classic and alternative rock mode, “somewhat reminiscent of U2 and Evanescence.”

== Reception ==
Professional ratings
Review scores
Source	Rating
Allmusic	3.5/5 stars
Christianity Today	3/5 stars
Cross Rhythms	8/10 stars
Jesus Freak Hideout	4/5 stars
New Release Tuesday	5/5 stars

Know Hope Collective received a good reception from critics. Allmusic gave the album three-and-a-half stars out of five, stating that "this may be the first album by Know Hope Collective, but it has been made by veterans in the CCM/Christian rock scene, and it sounds like it." Christianity Today gave the album three stars, noting that "[Know Hope Collective] explore themes of brokenness and restoration, but the music lacks lyrical vulnerability, and a more authentic sound would have lent better to the intended intimate atmosphere." Other reviewers were more generous, such as Cross Rhythms, which gave the album eight squares out of ten said that while “not all the songs are a stretch lyrically and could sometimes afford to go a little deeper… …they are honest and heartfelt.” Jesus Freak Hideout gave the album a four out of five, and online Christian music community New Release Tuesday gave the album a full five stars in its staff review.

In addition to the overall reception of the album, the album's second single to be released, “Build Us Back,” was originally recorded by Newsboys, and was featured as Gospel Music Channel’s online Download of the Week.

== Track listing ==
The album includes re-recorded versions of several hit Audio Adrenaline songs, "Ocean Floor," "Good Life," and "Hands and Feet," in addition to brand new tracks.

No.	Title	Writer(s)	Length
1.	"Attention"	McKendree Tucker, Mark Stuart, Jason Walker	4:05
2.	"Sanctuary"	Leslie Jordan, David Leonard, Walker	4:14
3.	"Build Us Back" (Newsboys cover)	Stuart, Walker	4:33
4.	"Hands and Feet"	Tyler Burkum, Bob Herdman, Will McGinniss, Charlie Peacock, Stuart	3:47
5.	"We Remember"	Stuart, Walker	3:30
6.	"Ocean Floor"	Burkum, Ben Cissell, Herdman, McGinniss, Stuart	4:02
7.	"Spirit Speaks"	Drew Cline, Jordan, Leonard	5:33
8.	"Jealous God"	Stuart, Walker	3:21
9.	"Good Life"	Herdman, McGinniss, Peacock, Stuart	3:46
10.	"Just to Be Here"	Stuart, Walker	4:02

== Lineup ==
- Mark Stuart
- Will McGinniss
- Julia Ross (vocalist for Everlife)
- David Leonard (of All Sons & Daughters, formerly of Jackson Waters and touring Needtobreathe guitarist)
- Leslie Jordan (of All Sons & Daughters)
- Jason Walker (2010 BMI Christian Music Award-winning Songwriter of the Year)
