= Adios: The Greatest Hits =

Greatest hits album by Audio Adrenaline
- Released: August 1, 2006
- Recorded: 1993–2006
- Studios: Tragedy/Tragedy and Sound Stage Studios (Nashville, Tennessee); Sound Kitchen (Franklin, Tennessee)
- Genre: Christian rock
- Length: 65:03
- Label: ForeFront
- Producer: Various

Audio Adrenaline chronology
Until My Heart Caves In (2005)	Adios: The Greatest Hits (2006)	Live From Hawaii: The Farewell Concert (2007)

Adios: The Greatest Hits was (at the time) the final album released by Christian rock band Audio Adrenaline, and their second Greatest Hits album.

== Overview ==
Adios was released seven months after the band had announced its disbanding due to lead singer Mark Stuart's ailing vocal cords. The album is a collection of their greatest hits, along with two newly recorded songs. The album also features a DVD with commentary from other Christian acts, such as tobyMac, Steven Curtis Chapman, MercyMe, Pillar, Kutless, Sanctus Real, and Relient K. The album was released on August 1, 2006.

== Reception ==
Professional ratings
Review scores
Source	Rating
AllMusic	4/5 stars
Jesus Freak Hideout	4.5/5 stars

The album received favorable reviews from critics. John DiBiase, of Jesus Freak Hideout, gave the album 4.5 stars out of 5, and called it "a worthy curtain call for Audio Adrenaline and an absolute must-have bookend for a fan's collection". James Christopher Monger, of AllMusic, gave the album 3 stars out of 5, while praising singer Mark Stuart's vocals on the new tracks. Russ Breimeier, of Christianity Today, gave a favorable review, but was disappointed that the compilation wasn't more apt for a farewell record. He wrote "Audio Adrenaline deserves a comprehensive double-CD anthology to do them justice. Adios feels more like a sampler and an overview for casual fans, not the snazzy farewell intended for the longtime faithful."

The song "Goodbye" was used in an episode of So You Think You Can Dance? as it aired in Australia in September 2007.

== Track listing ==
Adios: The Greatest Hits
No.	Title	Writer(s)	Originally recorded on	Length
1.	"Big House"	Barry Blair, Derrick Bostrom, Bob Herdman, Cris Kirkwood, Curt Kirkwood, Will McGinniss, Mark Stuart	Don't Censor Me	3:31
2.	"We're a Band"	Blair, Herdman, McGinniss, Stuart	Don't Censor Me	3:59
3.	"Never Gonna Be as Big as Jesus"	Blair, Herdman, McGinniss, Stuart	Bloom	4:26
4.	"Goodbye"	Tyler Burkum, Ben Cissell, Herdman, McGinniss	—	3:11
5.	"Chevette"	Herdman, McGinniss, Brian McSweeney, Stuart	Some Kind of Zombie	3:57
6.	"Some Kind of Zombie"	Blair, Herdman, McGinniss, Stuart	Some Kind of Zombie	4:47
7.	"Get Down"	Burkum, Cissell, Herdman, McGinniss, Stuart	Underdog	3:15
8.	"Hands and Feet"	Burkum, Herdman, McGinniss, Stuart	Underdog	4:05
9.	"Mighty Good Leader"	Burkum, Cissell, Herdman, McGinniss, Stuart	Underdog	3:14
10.	"Ocean Floor"	Burkum, Cissell, Herdman, McGinniss, Stuart	Lift	4:07
11.	"Beautiful"	Burkum, Cissell, Herdman, McGinniss, Stuart	Lift	3:48
12.	"Blaze of Glory"	Eddie Macdonald, Mike Peters, Dave Sharp	—	3:34
13.	"Leaving 99"	Burkum, Cissell, Herdman, McGinniss, Stuart	Worldwide	3:26
14.	"Pierced"	Burkum, Cissell, Herdman, McGinniss, Stuart	Worldwide	3:43
15.	"Miracle"	Burkum, Cissell, Herdman, McGinniss, Stuart	Worldwide	3:15
16.	"King"	Burkum, Cissell, Herdman, McGinniss, Stuart	Until My Heart Caves In	4:33
17.	"Starting Over"	Burkum, Cissell, Herdman, McGinniss, Stuart	Until My Heart Caves In	3:35
Total length:				64:55

Special Edition
No.	Title	Originally recorded on	Length
18.	"Down In the Lowlands"	—	4:13
19.	"Hands and Feet" (Live)	Underdog	4:35
20.	"Ocean Floor" (Live)	Lift	4:11

== Personnel ==
Audio Adrenaline

- Mark Stuart
- Tyler Burkum
- Will McGinniss
- Ben Cissell

Additional musician on "Goodbye" and "Blaze of Glory"

- Jay Joyce – keyboards, Hammond organ, acoustic guitars

== Production ==
- Brad O'Donnell – executive producer
- Steve Griffith – producer (1, 2)
- John Hampton – producer (3, 5, 6)
- Jay Joyce – producer (4, 12, 16, 17), recording (4, 12), mixing (12)
- Audio Adrenaline – producers (7, 9–11)
- Charlie Peacock – producer (8, 14)
- Jason Burkum – producer (13, 15), additional recording (12)
- Jason Hall – recording (4, 12)
- Nathan Dantzler – additional recording (12)
- F. Reid Shippen – mixing (4)
- Steve Lotz – mix assistant (4)
- Stephen Marcussen – mastering at Marcussen Mastering (Hollywood, California)
- Jess Chambers – A&R administration
- Holly Meyers – A&R administration
- Jan Cook – creative direction
- Louis Deluca – photography
- BOERHAUS Creative – packaging design
- BrickHouse Entertainment – management
