= Static (Bleach album) =

Bleach

Studio album by Bleach
- Released: June 30, 1998
- Studio: Antenna Studios (Brentwood, Tennessee); Fun Attic Studio and The Outfield (Franklin, Tennessee); On The Border (Nashville, Tennessee); The Church House
- Genre: Christian rock
- Length: 42:06
- Label: Forefront
- Producer: Barry Blair

Bleach chronology
Space (1996)	Bleach (1998)	Bleach (1999)

Professional ratings
Review scores
Source	Rating
Jesus Freak Hideout	4/5 stars
HM Magazine	(no rating)

Static is the second full-length album by the Christian rock band Bleach. It was released in 1998 under Forefront Records. The album peaked at 22 for 4 weeks on the Billboard Top Christian Albums chart during the summer of 1998, and is the only Bleach album to chart.

== Track listing ==
- All songs written by Bleach, except where noted.
1. "Static" - 3:17
2. "Super Good Feeling" - 3:18
3. "Rundown Town" - 4:53
4. "Land Of The Lost" - 3:16
5. "Hurricane" - 2:19
6. "Warp Factor Five" - 3:51
7. "Rock N Roll" (Bleach, Bob Herdman) - 3:47
8. "Code Of The Road" - 3:42
9. "Lonestar" - 3:59
10. "Drive" - 2:48
11. "Country Western Star" - 3:17
12. "Waving Goodbye" (Bleach, Shannon Ford) - 3:39

== Personnel ==
Bleach

- David Baysinger – vocals
- Sam Barnhart – guitars, guitar riffs, backing vocals
- Brad Ford – guitars, guitar riffs, guitar solos
- Todd Kirby – bass
- Matt Gingerich – drums, Rhodes electric piano (3), rhythm guitar (3), keyboards (6)

Additional musicians

- Hector Gomez – keyboards, backing vocals
- Otto Price – bass
- Jeanette Sullivan – vocals

=== Production ===
- Tedd T – executive producer
- Barry Blair – producer
- Marcelo Pennell – recording, mixing
- Jim McCaslin – assistant mix engineer
- Howie Weinberg – mastering at Masterdisk (New York, NY)
- Cindy Simmons – art direction
- Julee Brand – design
- Juan Pont Lezica – photography
- Lorrie Turk – hair, make-up
- Kristy Lord – wardrobe
- Lord & Michaels – management
