= Live Bootleg (Audio Adrenaline album) =

Live album by Audio Adrenaline
- Released: October 10, 1995
- Recorded: Fall 1994
- Venue: Various locations
- Genres: Christian rock, rap
- Length: 53:59
- Label: ForeFront
- Producer: Audio Adrenaline

Audio Adrenaline chronology
Don't Censor Me (1993)	Live Bootleg (1995)	Bloom (1996)

Live Bootleg is the first live album by American Christian rock band Audio Adrenaline, released on ForeFront Records on October 10, 1995. It contains live recordings of songs from the band's self-titled 1992 debut album and Don't Censor Me (1993), as well as an intro and a cover of "If You're Happy and You Know It". The album was recorded at concerts in Nevada, New Jersey, Oregon, Pennsylvania, and Washington in autumn 1994.

== Reception ==
Professional ratings
Review scores
Source	Rating
AllMusic	4/5 stars
Jesus Freak Hideout	2.5/5 stars

Live Bootleg received mixed reviews from critics. Most of them recommended it only to established fans of the band. David Denis, of Jesus Freak Hideout, gave the album 2.5 stars out of 5, writing that the album "does not hold up against their studio work. Most of the time, it feels underproduced, which in a way, constitutes the 'bootleg' feel of the album." John DiBiase, on the other hand, writes that the album "captures their live energy pretty well with its raw production and intimate presentation".

== Track listing ==
No.	Title	Writer(s)	Originally recorded on	Length
1.	"Intro"		–	1:01
2.	"We're a Band"	Barry Blair, Bob Herdman, Will McGinniss, Mark Stuart	Don't Censor Me (1993)	4:10
3.	"What You Need"	Blair, Herdman, Stuart	Audio Adrenaline (1992)	4:48
4.	"Can't Take God Away^{1}"	Blair, Todd Collins, Herdman, McGinniss, Toby McKeehan, Stuart	Don't Censor Me (1993)	4:56
5.	"Soulmate"	Blair, Herdman, McGinniss, Stuart	Don't Censor Me (1993)	3:55
6.	"Scum Sweetheart"	Blair, Herdman, McGinniss, Stuart	Don't Censor Me (1993)	4:40
7.	"Rest Easy"	Blair, Herdman, McGinniss, Stuart	Don't Censor Me (1993)	7:06
8.	"Don't Censor Me"	Blair, Herdman, McGinniss, Stuart	Don't Censor Me (1993)	4:06
9.	"Medley: My God/DC-10"	Blair, Herdman, Stuart	Audio Adrenaline (1992)	6:59
10.	"Big House^{2}"	Blair, Herdman, McGinniss, Stuart	Don't Censor Me (1993)	5:21
11.	"If You're Happy and You Know It^{3}"		–	6:52
Total length:				53:59

== Personnel ==
Audio Adrenaline

- Mark Stuart – lead vocals
- Bob Herdman – keyboards, guitars, vocals
- Barry Blair – lead guitars, vocals
- Will McGinniss – bass, vocals

Additional musician

- Brian Hayes – drums

Production

- Audio Adrenaline – producers
- Chris Michaelessi – engineer
- Louis Deluca – photography
- Chuck Hargett – art
- Kerri Stuart – art

== Notes ==
^{1.} Mistitled "Can't Take God" on the back of the CD insert.

^{2.} Mistitled "Bighouse" on the back of the CD insert.

^{3.} Titled "Happy and You Know It" on the back of the CD insert.
