= Bloom (Audio Adrenaline album) =

Studio album by Audio Adrenaline
- Released: February 20, 1996
- Recorded: 1995
- Studios: Ardent Recordings, Memphis, TN; The Salt Mine, Brentwood, TN; House of Insomnia, Franklin, TN
- Genre: Christian rock
- Length: 50:29
- Label: ForeFront
- Producers: John Hampton; The Gotee Brothers

Audio Adrenaline chronology
| Live Bootleg (1995) | Bloom (1996) | Some Kind of Zombie (1997) |

Alternate cover

Bloom is the third studio album released by Audio Adrenaline. In 1996, the album was certified Gold by RIAA.

== Concept ==
Bloom represented a departure from the band's previous efforts into a more straightforward rock with hints of grunge music. According to the band, both the title and the music reflects the way they've matured and "grown into a new phase of life".

== Recording ==
Bloom was recorded in 1995 at various studios in Tennessee: Ardent Recordings in Memphis, The Salt Mine in Brentwood, and House of Insomnia in Franklin. Producer, John Hampton, was in charge of the recording and mixing. The mastering was done by Ken Love at MasterMix, Nashville, Tennessee.

== Critical reception ==
Professional ratings
Review scores
| Source | Rating |
|---|---|
| AllMusic | 4.5/5 stars |
| Jesus Freak Hideout | 4.5/5 stars |

Bloom was well received by the audience becoming the first album of the band to be certified gold by RIAA. John DiBiase, of Jesus Freak Hideout, gave the album 4.5 stars out of 5, calling it "a brave and risky album for the band that only proved to be an ultimately wise stylistic change... it's among their best, and a dang good 90's rock album." Paul Portell, also of Jesus Freak Hideout, gave it 3.5 stars out of 5, and wrote that the album "showed Audio A's growth and potential... No 90's Christian rock fan should be without this monumental project." Sherwin Frias, of Jesus Freak Hideout too, praised the band's improved songwriting and called the album "fantastic" and "essential for any AudioA fan".

== Commercial performance ==
The album peaked at No. 77 on Billboard 200.

== Track listing ==
| No. | Title | Writer(s) | Length |
|---|---|---|---|
| 1. | "Secret" | Barry Blair, Bob Herdman, Will McGinniss, Mark Stuart | 3:43 |
| 2. | "Never Gonna Be as Big as Jesus^{[a]}^{[b]}" | Blair, Herdman, McGinniss, Stuart | 4:27 |
| 3. | "Good People" | Blair, Herdman, McGinniss, Stuart | 3:26 |
| 4. | "I'm Not the King^{[a]}" | Blair, Herdman, McGinniss, Stuart | 3:53 |
| 5. | "Walk on Water^{[a]}" | Blair, Herdman, McGinniss, Stuart | 3:52 |
| 6. | "See Through" | Blair, Herdman, McGinniss, Stuart | 4:58 |
| 7. | "Free Ride" | Dan Hartman | 3:23 |
| 8. | "Man of God" | Blair, Herdman, McGinniss, Stuart | 4:18 |
| 9. | "Gloryland" | Blair, Herdman, McGinniss, Stuart | 4:24 |
| 10. | "Jazz Odyssey" | Blair, Herdman, McGinniss, Stuart | 1:22 |
| 11. | "Bag Lady" | Blair, Herdman, McGinniss, Stuart | 4:11 |
| 12. | "I Hear Jesus Calling" | Blair, Herdman, McGinniss, Stuart | 3:22 |
| 13. | "Memoir" (The song "Memoir" ends at 4:06. After approximately 21 seconds of silence [4:06 - 4:27], an untitled hidden track begins: it is a brief studio out-take.) | Blair, Herdman, McGinniss, Stuart | 5:10 |
| Total length: | | | 50:37 |

^{a} appears on Hit Parade
^{b} appears on Adios: The Greatest Hits

== Personnel ==
Audio Adrenaline

- Mark Stuart – lead vocals, backing vocals
- Bob Herdman – keyboards, guitars, backing vocals
- Barry Blair – guitars, backing vocals
- Will McGinniss – bass, backing vocals

Additional musicians

- Eddie DeGarmo – keyboard arrangements
- Jason Halbert – Moog synthesizer (7)
- Greg Herrington – drums
- Todd Collins – percussion, backing vocals
- John Hampton – percussion
- Ben Cissell – percussion

Production

- Eddie DeGarmo – executive producer
- Dan R. Brock – executive producer
- John Hampton – producer (1–5, 8, 10–13), engineer (1–5, 8, 10–13), mixing
- The Gotee Brothers – producers (6, 7, 9)
- Erick Flettrich – engineer (1–5, 8, 10–13)
- John Mark Painter – engineer (6, 7, 9)
- Jef Curtiss – engineer (6, 7, 9)
- Todd Collins – additional engineer (6)
- Reid Waltz – additional engineer (6), production coordinator (6, 7, 9)
- Ken Love – mastering at MasterMix (Nashville, Tennessee)
- John Falls – photography
- Rusty Rust – aluminum photography
- Kerri McKeehan Stuart – art direction
- Brad Talbott – design
- True Artist Management – management
