= The Hands and Feet Project =

American nonprofit organization

The Hands & Feet Project is a 501(c)(3) non-profit organization which exists to "raise a generation of orphans who will grow into men and women who will have a relationship with Christ and be leaders in their communities." It began as a Children's Village located near Jacmel, Haiti. The Project has acquired land in Grand-Goâve and is in the early stages of building a second village, and is also renting a house in Port-au-Prince as a potential third location.

== Origins ==
The Hands and Feet Project was started by Christian rock band Audio Adrenaline in 2004. The name is based on the Audio Adrenaline song "Hands and Feet" (from the 1999 album Underdog). The idea for the Project was also inspired by the 2003 Audio Adrenaline album Worldwide, in which the band called for their listeners to "go and be" and get their hands "dirty". Frontman Mark Stuart stated: "We came to the point where we want to really step up and not just give a tip of the hat to missions and financially support them. We wanted to really embrace it and put our money where our mouth is. It is important for us to be hands and feet... We started the project to provide a place for orphaned children in Haiti to receive a roof over their heads and plenty of food as well as to come to a saving knowledge of Jesus Christ as their savior. It's also a place where people from the States can come and see what it is to serve and be the hands and feet of Jesus to the people of Haiti."

The Project is based on the Biblical teachings of James 1:27—"Religion that God our Father accepts as pure and faultless is this: to look after orphans and widows in their distress."

== Significant events ==
- Tropical Storm Noel hit the Cyvadier Project on October 29, 2007, flooding a path of destruction through the property. However, on August 25, 2008, the Project was devastated far worse by a series of four hurricanes—Gustav, Hanna, Ike, and Josephine—which left the entire property buried in six feet of mountain rock and caused more than $150,000 worth of damage at the site.
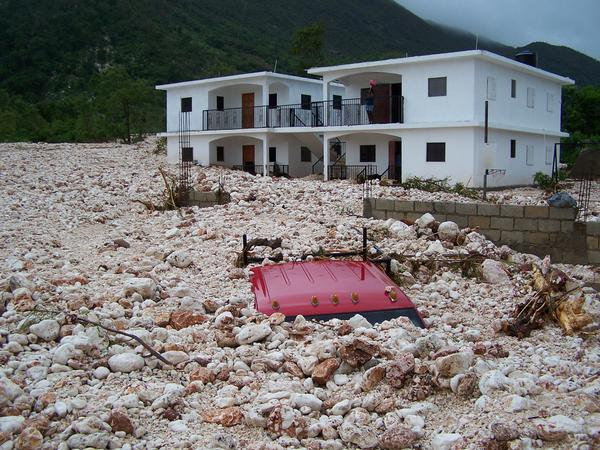
- Destruction at the H&FP after Hurricane Gustav
  On January 12, 2010, the Project sites in both Jacmel and Grand-Goâve were rocked by the 7.0 magnitude earthquake that struck just southwest of the Haitian capital of Port-au-Prince. Though none of the children or staff were injured, all but two of the buildings at the Grand-Goâve site were damaged beyond repair and the city of Jacmel was more than 80% destroyed. The Hands and Feet Project was the first organization—private or public—to arrange for relief to reach the city of Jacmel, making use of private planes whose service(s) were donated by their owners/pilots. Mark Stuart, who was at the Cyvadier Project with his wife when the earthquake struck, had this to say: "I’ve never been in a situation where you feel SO helpless, fearful, and small... I'm left wondering why this nation is so tied to tragedy."

== Book ==
Hands & Feet: Inspiring Stories and Firsthand Accounts of God Changing Lives is a travelogue-style journal released by Regal Books in September 2006. The book features entries from members of Audio Adrenaline, as well as Drex and Jo Stuart (co-founder, Mark Stuart's parents, who lead the project in Haiti), and students whose lives were inspired and changed upon visiting and serving the Lord in one of the poorest nations in the world.
