= Underdog (Audio Adrenaline album) =

Studio album by Audio Adrenaline
- Released: September 14, 1999
- Recorded: 1999
- Studio: Sound Stage Studios, Battery Studios, Sixteenth Avenue Sound, East Iris Studios and Masterfonics (Nashville, Tennessee); Dark Horse Recording Studio, The House of Insomnia, Tejas Recorders and The Castle (Franklin, Tennessee)
- Genre: Christian rock
- Length: 42:56
- Label: ForeFront
- Producer: Audio Adrenaline; Charlie Peacock; Todd Collins

Audio Adrenaline chronology
Some Kind of Zombie (1997)	Underdog (1999)	Hit Parade (2001)

Underdog is the fifth full-length album released by Audio Adrenaline. The album's lyrics are a slight departure from Some Kind of Zombie, as they focus more on missions and the word of God being spread, as shown in "Hands and Feet" and "Jesus Movement"; a theme that would reappear in Worldwide. Other songs, such as "Get Down" and "Good Life", reflect on God's influence in a Christian life.

The album also contains a more upbeat rerecording of "DC-10" (which had originally appeared on the band's debut album), a cover of "Let My Love Open the Door" by Pete Townshend, and a recording of "It Is Well With My Soul", the only recording of a traditional worship song on any of the band's albums.

== Concept and development ==
According to guitarist/songwriter Bob Herdman, the idea for the album was to "have more fun — not take this music so seriously — and just make songs that people like". The title of the album comes from the belief that Christians are usually seen as "underdogs" or "weak . . . but we're not. We're just the opposite. God's empowered us because we've become less for Him," says Herdman.

The album includes two covers and a re-recording. The song "Let My Love Open the Door" was written and recorded by Pete Townshend in 1980. The album also features the band's version of the popular hymn "It Is Well with My Soul", which features the guest vocals of Jennifer Knapp. The band also decided to record a new version of one of their first songs, "DC-10". The song, which was featured on the band's debut album, was a live staple of the band and is considered one of their most popular songs. According to Herdman, they "wanted to do something that kinda touched back with our roots, our very beginning. We were gonna do it like the Beastie Boys — more modern stuff … we were just goofin' around and the swing thing came around. Swing's such a big thing and we thought we would just make a joke of it. And do our song swing."

One of the songs, "The Houseplant Song", features guitarist/keyboardist Bob Herdman on the lead vocals. The lyrics were inspired by a story Herdman read on the Internet about the effects of music on plants. It features a number of pop culture references, including a line that says "the second one you play that Petra or that Megadeth", and the closing line which says "we listen to Audio Adrenaline, cranked to eleven", in reference to a line from the film This Is Spinal Tap.

== Recording ==
The album was recorded on several studios in Nashville, Tennessee: Tejas Studios, Dark Horse Studio, The Battery, 16 Ave Sound, and The House of Insomnia. Most of the recording was handled by Aaron Swihart at Tejas. However, recording at Dark Horse was handled by Shane D. Wilson and Richie Biggs, while recording at The House of Insomnia was handled by F. Reid Shippen and Todd Collins. Strings were also recorded by Swihart at Sound Stage Studio, in Nashville, and mixed at Castle Recordings.

Most of the mastering was done by Ted Jensen at Sterling Sound Studio, while digital edition was done by Paul Angelli. Mixing was done at East Iris Studio, Castle Recording Studios, and Masterphonics in Nashville. Shippen, Collins, and David Leonard where in charge of mixing.

== Promotion ==
Audio Adrenaline performed songs from Underdog during the Underdog Tour, the Diverse City Worldwide Tour, the Until My Heart Caves In Tour and the Kings & Queens Tours.

== Critical reception ==
Professional ratings
Review scores
Source	Rating
AllMusic	3/5 stars
HM Magazine	(favorable)
Jesus Freak Hideout	4.5/5 stars

Underdog was generally well received by critics. Steve Huey, of AllMusic, gave the album 3 stars out of 5, writing that overall, the album would please especially fans of the band. However, he writes that "the funk riffs still sometimes feel grafted onto the songs, which are melodic AOR at heart, and there are a few musically awkward moments here and there". John DiBiase, of Jesus Freak Hideout, gave the album 4.5 stars out of 5, and claimed it was the best album from the band since Don't Censor Me. He also wrote that Underdog surpasses "each album in talent, song craftmanship, tightness, bold message, and overall greatness."

Both "Get Down" and "Hands and Feet" were later featured in WOW 2000 and WOW Hits 2001 respectively, which features chart-topping and/or critically acclaimed Christian songs. Also, "Mighty Good Leader" was sampled by rapper Aceyalone for his song "Superstar", which was featured heavily in the 2004 video game ESPN NFL 2K5.

== Commercial performance ==
Underdog peaked at No. 76 on Billboard 200.

== Music videos ==
Music videos were made for the songs "Get Down" and "Hands and Feet". The video for "Hands and Feet" was recorded in the Darién Jungle in Panama with some local native tribes.

== Track listing ==
All tracks are written by Mark Stuart, Bob Herdman, Will McGinniss and Tyler Burkum, except where noted.

No.	Title	Writer(s)	Length
1.	"Mighty Good Leader ^{[a]}^{[b]}"	Mark Stuart, Bob Herdman, Will McGinniss, Tyler Burkum, Ben Cissell	3:15
2.	"Underdog^{[a]}"		3:30
3.	"Get Down^{[a]}^{[b]}"	Stuart, Herdman, McGinniss, Burkum, Cissell	3:16
4.	"Good Life"	Stuart, Herdman, McGinniss, Charlie Peacock	3:53
5.	"Let My Love Open the Door"	Pete Townshend	2:35
6.	"Hands and Feet^{[a]}^{[b]}"	Stuart, Herdman, McGinniss, Burkum, Peacock	4:08
7.	"Jesus Movement"		3:18
8.	"DC-10^{[a]}"	Stuart, Herdman, McGinniss, Barry Blair	2:26
9.	"It Is Well with My Soul" (featuring Jennifer Knapp)	Horatio Spafford, Philip Bliss	5:12
10.	"This Day"		3:25
11.	"It's Over"		3:57
12.	"The Houseplant Song"	Stuart, Herdman, McGinniss	4:04
Total length:			42:56

Notes

- ^{a} appears on Hit Parade
- ^{b} appears on Adios: The Greatest Hits

== Personnel ==
Audio Adrenaline

- Mark Stuart – lead vocals, backing vocals, harp (7), foley artist (12)
- Bob Herdman – keyboards, guitars, backing vocals, acoustic guitar (12), lead vocals (12), foley artist (12)
- Tyler Burkum – lead guitars, guitar (7, 9), backing vocals, foley artist (12)
- Will McGinniss – bass, backing vocals
- Ben Cissell – drums, drum overdubs (7), foley artist (12)

Additional musicians

- Greg Herrington – programming (1), musician (11)
- Eddie DeGarmo – Moog synthesizer (2)
- Mike Owsley – acoustic piano (3, 12), organ (5), backing vocals (12), foley artist (12)
- DJ Maj – scratches (3)
- Tony Miracle – programming (4, 6), synthesizers (4, 6)
- Mark Nicholas – accordion (7)
- Todd Collins – all other instruments (7, 9), programming (7, 9), additional bass (7), backing vocals (9)
- F. Reid Shippen – all other instruments (7, 9), programming (7, 9)
- Dan Spencer (of The O.C. Supertones) – trombone (7)
- Darren Mettler (of The O.C. Supertones) – trumpet (7)
- David Davidson – strings arrangements (9, 10)
- The Nashville String Machine – strings (9, 10)
- Chris Williamson – preacher (2)
- Charlie Peacock – additional vocals (4, 6), arrangements (4, 6)
- Claudia Tapia – Spanish vocals (7)
- Jennifer Knapp – lead vocals (9)

Production

- Eddie DeGarmo – executive producer
- Dan R. Brock – executive producer
- Audio Adrenaline – producers (1–3, 5, 8, 10–12)
- Charlie Peacock – producer (4, 6)
- Todd Collins (for the Gotee Brothers) – producer (7, 9), recording (7, 9), mixing (7, 9)
- Aaron Swihart – recording (1–3, 5, 8, 10–12), mixing (8, 12), string recording (9, 10)
- Richie Biggs – recording (4, 6)
- Shane D. Wilson – recording (4, 6)
- F. Reid Shippen – mixing (1, 7, 9, 11)
- David Leonard – mixing (2–6, 10)
- Charlie Brocco – mix assistant (4, 6)
- Dan Shike – mix assistant (7, 9)
- Paul Angelli – digital editing (1–3, 5, 7–12)
- Gil Gowing – digital editing (4, 6)
- Ted Jensen – mastering at Sterling Sound (New York City, New York)
- Mark Nicholas – A&R
- Mandy Galyean – A&R administration
- Molly Nicholas – project administration (4, 6)
- Susannah Parrish – creative coordinator
- Kerri McKeehan-Stuart – art direction, design, photography
- David Maxwell – photography
