= Kings & Queens (Audio Adrenaline album) =

Studio album by Audio Adrenaline
- Released: March 12, 2013
- Recorded: 2012
- Studio: Full Circle Music (Franklin, Tennessee); Farmland Studios (Nashville, Tennessee); Theory Studios (Germantown, Tennessee); Red Stagg (Los Angeles, California); The Lodge (Studio City, California); Volve Studios (Orlando, Florida)
- Genre: CCM, Christian rock
- Length: 36:57
- Label: Fair Trade Services
- Producer: Dwayne Larring; Seth Mosley

Audio Adrenaline chronology
Live from Hawaii: The Farewell Concert (2007)	Kings & Queens (2013)	Sound of the Saints (2015)

Singles from Kings & Queens
- 1. "Kings & Queens" Released: October 22, 2012

Kings & Queens is the ninth studio album by Christian rock band Audio Adrenaline, the only Audio Adrenaline album with Kevin Max as the lead singer and the last album with bassist and founding member Will McGinniss. The album was released on March 12, 2013, and was the first album after their comeback and with the Fair Trade Services label. Kings & Queens garnered critical acclaim from music critics, and has seen chart successes.

== Critical reception ==
Professional ratings
Review scores
Source	Rating
AllMusic	4/5 stars
CCM Magazine	4/5 stars
Christian Music Review	4.5/5 stars
Christian Music Zine	4.5/5 stars
CM Addict	5/5 stars
Cross Rhythms	8/10 squares
Indie Vision Music	4/5 stars
Jesus Freak Hideout	3.5/5 stars 4.5/5 stars
Louder Than the Music	4.5/5 stars
New Release Tuesday	5/5 stars
The Phantom Tollbooth	4/5 stars
Worship Leader	4.5/5 stars

Audio Adrenaline's Kings & Queens garnered critical acclaim from the 13 music critics that reviewed and rated the album. The work got two five-star perfect reviews from CM Addict and New Release Tuesday. The album has received four four-and-a-half-stars-out-of-five by Christian Music Review, Christian Music Zine and Jesus Freak Hideout's John DiBiase, Louder Than the Music, Worship Leader. The effort got three four-stars-out-of-five from Allmusic, CCM Magazine, Indie Vision Music and The Phantom Tollbooth. The project got one lone three-and-a-half-stars-out-out-five review by Roger Gelwicks of Jesus Freak Hideout.

CM Addict's Andrew Funderburk called it "possibly the greatest comeback project in Christian music today" that "doesn’t slow its pace until the project ends", and has the message of "empowerment for us to rise to the position that Jesus Christ has made for us and to live in that position of our identity in Him." Sarah Fine of New Release Tuesday vowed that the album was "On point in every aspect, there isn't a single weak song, each one holding immense potential to become a hit. While it varies in style and sound, the consistent theme of redemption throughout ties it together, making it an album you'll want to listen to again and again. Older fans will be surprised to hear how much of the original sound has crossed over into this new formation, yet old and new listeners alike will enjoy the exciting melodic prospects being presented here."

Daniel Edgeman of Christian Music Review found that "All of the songs have a great message. I am very impressed at the depth of the lyrics. After listening to this album I breathed a big breath of relief, Audio Adrenaline is back." Christian Music Zine's Emily Kjonaas foretold that "Kings & Queens turned out to be a fresh album that will keep both old and new fans alike." Jono Davies of Louder Than the Music found that "As a collection of songs, Audio Adrenaline have really surpassed themselves here. The lyrics and melodies sound fresh, which makes the album stand out compared to many other albums around at the moment. There is a mix of rock tracks and modern synth tracks, making Kings & Queens an album well worth checking out." DiBiase of Jesus Freak Hideout found that "Kings and Queens is Audio Adrenaline with a new voice for a new time. It's looking to be one of the best pop rock records in recent memory, but diehard fans who can't imagine any other vocalist besides Stuart", but DiBiase criticized that "The only thing that may be missing from Kings and Queens would be some of the more raw rock leanings the band has displayed through most of their albums." Lastly, DiBiase proclaimed that "Kings and Queens takes more of a Don't Censor Me approach with a more polished pop sound. So, band name aside, for the CCM realm, this just may be a match made in heaven." At Worship Leader, Greg Wallace found that "as a band with a strong pedigree delivers on their potential."

Allmusic's David Jeffries found that when he "add[ed] it all up and this is a comeback worth coming back to and another highlight in the band's discography." Grace S. Aspinwall of CCM Magazine wrote that "In the recent tradition of music heavy-weight comebacks, Audio A retains its trademark pop, upbeat style, but with the addition of Kevin Max on lead vocals, is unlike anything we've heard before. A solid album from start to finish, it is most decidedly a new sound. The techno-based rock ambiance provides a solid foundation that is then layered with heartfelt lyrics, tight musicianship and Kevin's distinct voice, which only faintly resonates with the tight vibrato that hallmarked the dcTalk years." Indie Vision Music's Jonathan Andre called it "one of the greatest comebacks in Christian music history!" Bert Saraco of The Phantom Tollbooth affirmed that the album "will not disappoint" because the band "are sounding more energetic and confident than ever", and in doing so "manages to be commercial without being trite." At Cross Rhythms, Tony Cummings felt that this album was "an excellent launch pad." Gelwicks noted that "Kings & Queens grabbed the role of the most historic album to drop in 2013, and thankfully, it largely delivers. Audio Adrenaline's currently lineup still have a lot of work to do to build a unique identity as a new band, and though Kings & Queens is a solid first attempt to reach that goal, they can afford to take larger artistic risks in the near future."

== Commercial performance ==
On March 30, 2013, the album was the No. 70 most sold album on the Billboard 200 chart, and the No. 4 most sold Christian Albums chart.

== Track listing ==
Kings & Queens
No.	Title	Writer(s)	Length
1.	"He Moves You Move"	Mark Stuart, Jason Walker	3:03
2.	"Kings & Queens"	Chuck Butler, Juan Otero, Joel Parisien	3:49
3.	"Believer"	Kevin Max, Stuart, Walker	3:28
4.	"King of the Comebacks"	Max, Seth Mosley, Stuart	3:03
5.	"Change My Name"	Max, Mosley, Stuart	3:52
6.	"20:17 (Raise the Banner)"	Dominic Balli, Stuart, Walker	3:23
7.	"Fire Never Sleeps"	Nick Herbert, Martin Smith	4:33
8.	"Seeker"	Max, Mosley, Stuart	3:20
9.	"I Climb the Mountain"	Ricky Jackson, Anthony Skinner	4:28
10.	"The Answer"	Max, Mosley	3:58
Total length:			36:57

== Personnel ==
Audio Adrenaline

- Kevin Max – vocals
- Jason Walker – keyboards, vocals
- Dave Ghazarian – guitars
- Will McGinniss – bass
- Jared Byers – drums

Additional musicians

- Ricky Jackson – keyboards, programming, bass, backing vocals
- Dwayne Larring – keyboards, guitars, percussion, backing vocals
- Tim Lauer – keyboards, programming, percussion
- Seth Mosley – keyboards, programming, guitars, bass, backing vocals
- Stu G – guitars
- Tony Lucido – bass
- Casey Brown – drums
- Steven Kadar – drums
- Ben Phillips – drums
- Arie Tidwell – drums
- DJ Maj – DJ
- Blanca Callahan – additional vocals (6)

Production

- James Rueger – A&R
- Wes Campbell – executive producer
- Mark Stuart – executive producer
- Dave Wagner – executive producer
- Seth Mosley – producer (1–6, 8, 10), mixing (1, 4, 5, 8, 10), editing (6), recording
- Jason Walker – additional production (3)
- Dwayne Larring – producer (7, 9), recording (7, 9)
- Buckley Miller – recording
- Mike "X" O'Connor – recording, editing (6)
- Andy Anderson – recording (6)
- Neal Avron – mixing (2)
- Christopher Stevens – mixing (3, 6)
- Rich Renken – mixing at Rev4 Audio (Burbank, California) (7, 9)
- Micah Kuiper – editing (6)
- Jonathan Steingard – editing (6)
- Dave McNair – mastering at Dave McNair Mastering (Winston-Salem, North Carolina)
- Jeremy Cowart – pthography
- Jason Barrett – art direction, design
- Jonathan Powell – wardrobe assistant
- First Company Management – management

== Charts ==
Chart (2013)	Peak position
US Billboard 200	70
US Top Christian Albums (Billboard)	4
