= Kings & Queens (Audio Adrenaline song) =

Single by Audio Adrenaline

from the album Kings & Queens
- Released: October 22, 2012
- Genre: Christian contemporary-alternative-rock
- Length: 3:50
- Label: Fair Trade
- Songwriter(s): Charles Butler, Juan Otero, Joel Parisien

Audio Adrenaline singles chronology
"Goodbye" (2006)	"Kings & Queens" (2012)	"Believer" (2013)

Music video
- "Kings & Queens" on YouTube

"Kings & Queens" is a song by Christian contemporary-alternative-rock band Audio Adrenaline from their ninth studio album, Kings & Queens. It was released on October 22, 2012, as the first single from the album.

== Themes ==
"Kings & Queens" deals with themes of Christian service to "the least of these", a reference to Matthew 25:40. The song was inspired by the band's work with the Hands and Feet Project, a ministry to Haitian orphans. The music video for the song was filmed at the project in Haiti and features some of the orphans helped by the ministry.

== Release ==
The song "Kings & Queens" was digitally released as the lead single from Kings & Queens on October 22, 2012.

== Uses ==
The song appeared on the compilation album WOW Hits 2014.

It also appeared in the 2018 Christian drama film God Bless the Broken Road.

== Charts ==
=== Weekly charts ===
Chart (2013)	Peak position
US Christian AC (Billboard)	7
US Christian Airplay (Billboard)	4
US Hot Christian Songs (Billboard)	4
US Christian AC Indicator (Billboard)	2
US Christian Soft AC (Billboard)	11

=== Year-end charts ===
Chart (2013)	Peak position
US Christian Songs (Billboard)	20
