= Superfriend =

Super Friends is an animated television show based on DC Comics superheroes. The term or others like it may also refer to:

- "Superfriend", a song by Audio Adrenaline from the 1997 album Some Kind of Zombie
- "Superfriend", a song by Rivers Cuomo from the 2007 album Alone: The Home Recordings of Rivers Cuomo
