= Space (Bleach album) =

Studio album by Bleach
- Released: October 29, 1996
- Studios: 9070 Studios (Brentwood, Tennessee); The Salt Mine (Nashville, Tennessee); House of Insomnia (Franklin, Tennessee)
- Genre: Christian rock
- Length: 41:32
- Label: Forefront
- Producer: Barry Blair

Bleach chronology
Space (1996)	Static (1998)

Professional ratings
Review scores
Source	Rating
Jesus Freak Hideout	(2.5/5)

Space is the debut album by Bleach. It was released in 1996 under Forefront Records.

== Track listing ==
All songs written by Bleach

1. "Eleven" - 3:02
2. "Perfect Family" - 2:57
3. "Epidermis Girl" - 3:57
4. "Tea for Two" - 4:33
5. "Cold & Turning Blue" - 4:18
6. "Child of Sod" - 3:23
7. "Crystals and Cash" - 3:43
8. "Wonderful" - 3:54
9. "Cannonball" - 3:56
10. "Sugarcoated Ways" - 4:14
11. "Space" - 3:43

== Personnel ==
Bleach

- David Baysinger – vocals
- Brad Ford – Wurlitzer electric piano, guitars
- Sam Barnhart – guitars, backing vocals
- Todd Kirby – bass
- Matt Gingerich – drums

Additional musicians

- Todd Collins – percussion
- Bob Mason – cello

=== Production ===
- Dan R. Brock – executive producer
- Eddie DeGarmo – executive producer
- Barry Blair – producer
- Marcelo Pennell – recording, mixing
- Ken Love – mastering at MasterMix (Nashville, Tennessee)
- Jim Dantzler – art direction
- Thunder Image Group – photography
- Genie Greeman – make-up
- Mike Kell & Associates – management
