= Audio Adrenaline (album) =

Studio album by Audio Adrenaline
- Released: April 17, 1992
- Studio: A Cut Above Studio, Quad Studios and The Salt Mine (Nashville, Tennessee); Landmark Studios (Chesapeake, Ohio)
- Genre: Christian rock, rap, pop
- Length: 46:40
- Label: ForeFront
- Producer: Steve Griffith; Audio Adrenaline

Audio Adrenaline chronology
Audio Adrenaline (1992)	Don't Censor Me (1993)

Audio Adrenaline is the debut studio album by the American Christian rock band of the same name. It was released on April 17, 1992. "My God" was one of the first songs recorded by the band, which caught the attention of ForeFront Records.

== Development ==
According to the band, the album came to be when they met Bob Herdman. The band, which was known as A-180 at the time, had been playing and touring for some time already. Herdman approached them to record a song he had written called "My God" which mixed metal and rap. After they did, they asked Herdman to join the band as their keyboardist. Herdman also suggested they change their name, which they did to Audio Adrenaline.

Producer and singer Toby McKeehan (from dc Talk) stumbled upon the recording of "My God", and they met after a dc Talk concert in 1989. McKeehan then brought the tape to the people at Forefront Records and they decided to sign the band. They then started writing and recording songs in the same vein as "My God", combining rock/pop elements with rap.

== Reception ==
Professional ratings
Review scores
Source	Rating
AllMusic	3/5 stars
Cross Rhythms	6/10 stars
Jesus Freak Hideout	3/5 stars

Audio Adrenaline was generally well received by the audience selling 75,000 copies. Thom Granger, of AllMusic, gave the album 3 stars out of 5 and called it a "decent debut". Paul Portell, of Jesus Freak Hideout, gave the album 3 stars out of 5. Portell wrote that the album "showed early on that you can be in a Christian band with positive lyrics and still have fun all in the same." However, he pointed out that "the album does have a few flaws". John DiBiase, of Jesus Freak Hideout too, wrote that the album "has a few memorable tunes". The album features the song "DC-10", which would later be featured in several compilations of the band.

In later interviews, band members have expressed their dislike for the album. Guitarist Barry Blair said in an interview with CCM Magazine about the album "If it was up to me, I would burn them all, make them disappear... There is nothing personal about that record." Despite this, the song "DC-10" was remade for Audio Adrenaline's fifth studio album, Underdog, albeit with a swing rhythm.

== Music videos ==
A music video for the song "PDA" was released.

== Track listing ==
No.	Title	Lyrics	Music	Length
1.	"One Step Hyper"	Bob Herdman, Mark Stuart	Blair, Will McGinniss, Stuart	4:20
2.	"What You Need^{[a]}"	Herdman	Blair, Stuart	4:26
3.	"Who Do You Love"	Herdman, Stuart	Stuart	3:49
4.	"PDA"	Herdman, Stuart	Blair, Stuart	4:08
5.	"The Most Excellent Way"	Herdman, Stuart	Blair, Stuart	4:25
6.	"J-E-S-U-S Is Right"	Herdman	Blair, Herdman	4:30
7.	"Revolution"	Stuart	Blair, Stuart	5:15
8.	"Audio World"	Herdman, Stuart	Blair, Stuart	4:32
9.	"DC-10^{[a]}^{[b]}^{[c]}"	Herdman	Blair, Stuart	3:12
10.	"My God^{[a]}"	Herdman	Blair, Stuart (choir)	3:38
11.	"Life"	Blair, Herdman, Stuart	Blair, Steve Griffith, McGinniss, Stuart	4:21
Total length:				46:40

^{a} Live recording later appeared on Live Bootleg (1995)
^{b} Demo recording originally appeared on Reaper's Train (1990)
^{c} Re-recorded for Underdog (1999)

== Personnel ==
Audio Adrenaline

- Mark Stuart – lead vocals, raps, mouth noises, various voices
- Barry Blair – acoustic guitars, electric guitars, backing vocals, drum programming (10), various voices
- Will McGinniss – bass, backing vocals, various voices
- Bob Herdman – percussion, general effects, backing vocals, raps, various voices

Additional musicians

- Steve Griffith – keyboards, programming, arrangements
- Dan Kellerby – keyboards, programming
- Jeffrey Mingle – keyboards, programming, various voices
- Jimmy Abegg – acoustic guitars (2, 3, 6, 8)
- Ron Gibson – drums (9), backing vocals (9)
- Kids Choir – choir (6)
- Jeanette Sullivan – beautiful angelic voice (6)
- Dave Stuart – backing vocals (9)

Choir on "My God"

- Helen DeCanio
- Mary DeCanio
- Steve Murphy
- Mark Stuart

=== Production ===
- Dan R. Brock – executive producer
- Ron W. Griffin – executive producer
- Steve Griffith – producer (1–8, 11), recording, mixing
- Audio Adrenaline – producers (9, 10)
- Steve Hoffman – engineer (9, 10)
- Steve Murphy – engineer (9, 10)
- Hank Williams – mastering at MasterMix (Nashville, Tennessee)
- Russ Harrington – photography
- Stephen Murray – art direction, design
- Michele Probst – make-up
