= Lift (Audio Adrenaline album) =

Studio album by Audio Adrenaline
- Released: November 20, 2001
- Genre: Christian rock
- Length: 54:20
- Label: ForeFront
- Producer: Audio Adrenaline

Audio Adrenaline chronology
| Hit Parade (2001) | Lift (2001) | Worldwide (2003) |

Lift is the sixth studio album by Christian rock band Audio Adrenaline, released in 2001.

== Concept and development ==
The concept of the album Lift came from several meanings, according to guitarist Tyler Burkum. In an interview with Jesus Freak Hideout, Burkum said:

"It's kinda like how if you lift God up. But not only God, there are many ways you can take it. Like how God lifts us up. There are many surface-level ways to take it. The whole thing is kinda how when we lift Christ up to people, we don't have to explain what God is. If you just worship Him and just point to God, that's enough. It's weird cause through the record there's this kind of like this underlying feeling of hope on the whole record. And it wasn't even like we tried to do that. It was just kind of there – this hope and a kind of a peace the way God lifts us up. The record is kind of like what happens when you worship. It's not really worship music, but what happens when you worship."

Burkum also said that the worship nature of most of the songs was not something they planned, but that surged eventually during the writing/recording process. This is also the first album where Burkum and lead singer Mark Stuart share most of the lead vocals.

== Recording ==
Unlike their previous albums, Lift was not recorded in a traditional studio. The band bought a house in a neighborhood in Nashville, Tennessee, and turned it into a studio. Guitarist Tyler Burkum said in an interview that it was "really cool, really fun. That made it for a really low key, low stress atmosphere."

== Critical reception ==
Professional ratings
Review scores
| Source | Rating |
|---|---|
| AllMusic | 3/5 stars |
| Cross Rhythms | 10/10 stars |
| Jesus Freak Hideout | 5/5 stars |

The album was well received by the audience becoming the second album from Audio Adrenaline to be certified gold by RIAA. It was also received well by critics. John DiBiase, of Jesus Freak Hideout, gave the album 5 stars out of 5 calling the album "amazing", "a brilliant step for this pop/rock icon" and "the band's best record to date". Tony Cummings, of Cross Rhythms, gave the album a similar excellent review (10 out of 10) also calling it "their best album ever". Steve Losey, of AllMusic, gave the album 3 stars out of 5, writing that the album "proves [the band] still have the chops to reign as one of the best bands Christian music has to offer" while also praising Mark Stuart vocals. Both Losey and DiBiase specifically praised the song "Ocean Floor" calling it "one of the best sonic offerings on the release" and "the song that will have the greatest impact from the album".

== Commercial performance ==
The album peaked at No. 169 on Billboard 200.

== Music videos ==
Music videos were released for the songs "Ocean Floor" and "Rejoice".

== DVD ==
In November 2002, a year after the album's released, the band released a DVD to complement the album. The DVD contains three music videos, song clips from the album, and featurettes containing interviews and other footage.

== Track listing ==
All tracks are written by Tyler Burkum, Ben Cissell, Bob Herdman, Will McGinniss and Mark Stuart

| No. | Title | Length |
|---|---|---|
| 1. | "You Still Amaze Me" | 4:18 |
| 2. | "I'm Alive" | 3:30 |
| 3. | "Beautiful" (^{[a]}) | 3:48 |
| 4. | "Ocean Floor" (^{[a]}) | 4:07 |
| 5. | "Rejoice" | 3:56 |
| 6. | "Speak to Me" | 4:03 |
| 7. | "Glory" | 4:08 |
| 8. | "Summertime" | 3:06 |
| 9. | "This Is Everything" | 4:05 |
| 10. | "Lift" | 3:55 |
| 11. | "Tremble" | 7:51 |
| 12. | "Beautiful" (Radio Remix) | 3:49 |
| 13. | "Lonely Man" (From the Demo Sessions) | 3:43 |
| Total length: | | 54:19 |

Note

- ^{a} appears on Adios: The Greatest Hits

== Personnel ==
Audio Adrenaline

- Mark Stuart – lead vocals, percussion
- Tyler Burkum – keyboards, guitars, lead vocals
- Will McGinniss – bass, vocals
- Ben Cissell – drums, percussion, vocals

Production

- Greg Ham – executive producer
- Mark Nicholas – executive producer, A&R
- Audio Adrenaline – producers
- Aaron Swihart – engineer, mixing
- J.R. McNeely – mixing
- Joe Baldridge – mixing
- Susannah Parrish – art coordination
- Scott McDaniel – art direction
- Neal Ashby – design
- Marina Chavez – photography
- Kerri McKeehan-Stuart – stylist
- BrickHouse Entertainment – management
