= Some Kind of Zombie =

Studio album by Audio Adrenaline
- Released: November 18, 1997
- Recorded: 1997
- Studio: Ardent Studios, Memphis, Tennessee; Shakin' Studios, Franklin, Tennessee
- Genre: Christian rock
- Length: 47:17
- Label: ForeFront
- Producer: John Hampton

Audio Adrenaline chronology
Bloom (1996)	Some Kind of Zombie (1997)	Underdog (1999)

Some Kind of Zombie is the fourth studio album released by Audio Adrenaline.

== Concept ==
According to Audio Adrenaline, the album concept and its title song are based on the Scripture, specifically Colossians, Chapter 3, where it talks about "giving life over to God". The inspiration came from singer Mark Stuart's experience living with his missionary parents in Haiti, where voodoo is heavily practiced. According to Stuart, the message is that "you can be dead to your old self after becoming a new person through religion."

== Recording ==
Some Kind of Zombie was recorded in 1997 at Ardent Recordings in Memphis and Shakin' Studios in Franklin. Recording was produced by John Hampton. Jason Latshaw and Matt Martone assisted as engineers. The LP was mixed by Skidd Mills. The album included a remix of the title song called "Some Kind of Zombie (Criscoteque Remix)", which was remixed by Scott Humphrey. This track is not available on the audiocassette release of the album. A "Chevette (Remix)" can be found on the compilation album WOW 1999.

The album is the first Audio Adrenaline album to feature guitarist Tyler Burkum. It is also the first album to officially list Ben Cissell as the band's drummer. Additionally, the song "Blitz" features members of Christian ska band The O.C. Supertones, including Matt Morginsky as a guest vocalist.

== Critical reception ==
Professional ratings
Review scores
Source	Rating
allmusic	4/5 stars
Jesus Freak Hideout	3.5/5 stars

Some Kind of Zombie was well received by critics. John DiBiase, of Jesus Freak Hideout, gave the album 3.5 stars out of 5, calling it a "fantastic record and a must-listen for any Audio Adrenaline or modern rock fan." AllMusic's Stephen Thomas Erlewine gave the album 4 out of 5 stars writing that "the group improves with each record, delivering tougher, catchier riffs and sharper performances".

== Commercial performance ==
The album peaked at No. 99 on Billboard 200.

== Music videos ==
Audio Adrenaline recorded music videos for the songs "Some Kind of Zombie" and "Blitz".

== Track listing ==
All tracks are written by Bob Herdman, Will McGinnis, and Mark Stuart, except where noted.

No.	Title	Writer(s)	Length
1.	"Chevette^{[a]}^{[b]}"	Bob Herdman, Will McGinniss, Brian McSweeney, Mark Stuart	4:17
2.	"New Body"	Herdman, Brian Kotzur, McGinniss, Pennell, Stuart	3:57
3.	"Some Kind of Zombie^{[a]}^{[b]}"	Barry Blair, Herdman, McGinniss, Stuart	4:45
4.	"Original Species"		4:32
5.	"People Like Me"		3:15
6.	"Blitz^{[a]}" (featuring The O.C. Supertones)		4:13
7.	"Lighthouse"		5:01
8.	"Flicker"		3:55
9.	"God-Shaped Hole"		4:08
10.	"Superfriend"		3:09
11.	"Some Kind of Zombie (Criscoteque Remix)" (hidden track)		4:37

Notes

- ^{a} appears on Hit Parade
- ^{b} appears on Adios: The Greatest Hits

== Personnel ==
Audio Adrenaline

- Mark Stuart – lead vocals
- Bob Herdman – keyboards, guitars, backing vocals
- Tyler Burkum – guitars
- Will McGinniss – bass, backing vocals, yak back
- Ben Cissell – drums, percussion

Additional musicians

- Barry Blair – guitars (3)
- Carlos Pennell – guitars (8)
- Carl Marsh – string arrangements (2–5, 9)
- Dave Chevalier (from The O.C. Supertones) – tenor saxophone (6)
- Dan Spencer (from The O.C. Supertones) – trombone (6)
- Darren Mettler (from The O.C. Supertones) – trumpet (6)
- Matt Morginsky (from The O.C. Supertones) – guest vocal (6)
- Jeannette Sullivan – additional backing vocals (8)

=== Production ===
- Eddie DeGarmo – executive producer
- Dan R. Brock – executive producer
- John Hampton – producer
- Scott Humphrey – producer of "Some Kind of Zombie (Criscoteque remix)"
- Skidd Mills – mixing
- Jason Latshaw – second engineer
- Matt Martone – second engineer
- John Falls – photography
- Rusty Rust – aluminum photography
- Kerri McKeehan Stuart – art direction
- Brad Talbott – illustration, design
- True Artist Management – management
