= Jared Byers =

American musician

Jared Ryan Byers
- Origin: Nashville, Tennessee, United States
- Genres: Christian rock, alternative rock
- Occupation: Musician
- Instruments: Drums, vocals
- Years active: 2000–present
- Member of: Peter Furler Band
- Formerly of: Bleach, Relient K, Audio Adrenaline

Jared Byers is an American drummer. He was formerly the drummer for the rock bands Relient K, Bleach, Royal Empire Music, and Audio Adrenaline. Byers had previously filled-in on drums for Audio Adrenaline during a tour in early 2007, which were to be the band's final shows before reuniting in 2013. He also played drums for The Rocket Summer on tour.

In 2003, Byers and his brother Milam, who was also in Bleach, took time off after their brother, Joshua, was killed while deployed in Iraq. The brothers returned to playing in the band around the time of Rock the Universe 2003, where it was said that they were "clearly giving their heart and soul into each moment of the set."

In 2010, the supergroup The Honeymoon Thrillers was formed. This band consists of Nathan Barlowe (from Luna Halo) on guitar and vocals, Cary Barlowe (from Luna Halo) on lead guitar, Chris Boyle (from Mean Tambourines) on bass, Josiah Holland (from The Lonely Hearts) on keyboards, and Byers on drums.

In 2015, Byers left Audio Adrenaline, to pursue other interests.
