= Again, for the First Time =

Studio album by Bleach
- Released: August 27, 2002
- Recorded: 2002 at Playground Studio Nashville, Tennessee; Sac River in Stockton, Missouri; EMI Studio in Nashville, Tennessee; Vital Studios in Nashville, Tennessee; Oran's Garage/Studio B
- Genre: Christian rock
- Length: 34:52
- Label: Tooth & Nail Records
- Producer: Oran Thornton

Bleach chronology
Bleach (1999)	Again, for the First Time (2002)	Astronomy (2003)

Professional ratings
Review scores
Source	Rating
Allmusic	3/5 stars
Jesus Freak Hideout	4.5/5 stars

Again, for the First Time is the fourth full-length album by the Christian rock band Bleach. It was released in 2002 on Tooth & Nail Records.

== Track listing ==
1. "Intro" – 0:17
2. "Baseline" – 2:25
3. "Celebrate" – 2:40
4. "Broke in the Head" – 3:07
5. "We Are Tomorrow" – 2:53
6. "Fell Out" – 2:38
7. "Weak at the Knees" – 2:48
8. "Found You Out" – 3:05
9. "Said a Lot" – 3:17
10. "Almost Too Late" – 2:08
11. "Andy's Doin' Time" – 3:39
12. "Knocked Out" – 3:40
13. "Jenn's Song" – 1:47
