= Farewell Old Friends =

Studio album by Bleach
- Released: March 1, 2005
- Recorded: 2004
- Genre: Christian rock
- Length: 50:16
- Label: Tooth & Nail Records
- Producer: Oran Thornton

Bleach chronology
Astronomy (2003)	Farewell Old Friends (2005)	Audio/Visual (2005)

Professional ratings
Review scores
Source	Rating
Jesus Freak Hideout	4.5/5 stars

Farewell Old Friends is the sixth full-length album by the Christian rock band Bleach. It was released in 2005 under Tooth & Nail Records. This is Bleach's last album and was released after the band disbanded.

== Track listing ==
All tracks by Bleach

1. "Write It Down" -3:09
2. "Clear the Air" -4:09
3. "Gonna Take Some Time" -4:44
4. "Took It by the Hand" -3:36
5. "Condition" -3:37
6. "To the Top" -4:07
7. "Sufficient" -10:14
8. "Weight of It All" -2:50
9. "Good as Gold" -4:24
10. "Farewell Old Friends" -9:19
11. "Hidden Track: "I've Been Everywhere..." 3:59 (Johnny Cash cover)

== Personnel ==
- Sam Barnhart – guitar, vocals
- Dave Baysinger – lead vocals
- Jared Byers – drums
- Milam Byers – lead guitar
- Jerry Morrison – bass guitar
