= Until My Heart Caves In =

Studio album by Audio Adrenaline
- Released: August 30, 2005
- Studios: Tragedy/Tragedy and Masterlink Studio (Nashville, Tennessee); FabMusic (Franklin, Tennessee); Blue Heaven Studio (Salina, Kansas)
- Genre: Christian rock
- Length: 43:16
- Label: ForeFront
- Producers: Jay Joyce; Audio Adrenaline; Christopher Stevens

Audio Adrenaline chronology
Worldwide (2003)	Until My Heart Caves In (2005)	Adios: The Greatest Hits (2006)

Until My Heart Caves In is the eighth studio album by Audio Adrenaline and the final album with Mark Stuart as the lead vocalist. The album was released on August 30, 2005 on ForeFront Records and went on to win the Grammy Award for Rock Gospel Album of the Year.

== Concept and development ==
Frontman Mark Stuart commented on the meaning of the album:

"Until My Heart Caves In is about living for God until your body collapses. It's about never giving up, even when you feel like it. So many people aren't living with a fire in their hearts on a day-to-day basis... We should be living like warriors and get out there worried less about the nice clothes and plastic personas and more about getting on the edge, living with authentic and real passion."

After guitarist Tyler Burkum took lead vocals on several songs on Worldwide, this album features Burkum singing lead on more than half of the album. Five months after the album was released, Mark Stuart announced the band would be disbanding, due to the stress of touring on Mark Stuart's vocal cords.

== Critical reception ==
Professional ratings
Review scores
Source	Rating
AllMusic	4/5 stars
CCM Magazine	B
Christian Broadcasting Network	3/5 spins
Christianity Today	3.5/5 stars
Cross Rhythms	10/10 stars
Jesus Freak Hideout	4/5 stars
The Phantom Tollbooth	4/5 stars
Soul Shine	3.5/5 stars

The album was well received by critics. Jared Johnson of AllMusic rated the album four stars out of five, writing that "it would be tough to argue that this final output allowed them to go out on top." At Jesus Freak Hideout, John DiBiase rated the album four stars out of five, writing that the album is "a solid melodic rock record from start to finish (although sadly on the shorter side)". DiBiase commented that despite how he missed Stuart's trademark vocals, praised Burkum's writing that "[his] smooth, youthful vocals have never sounded better, giving the album a unique pop/rock vibe different from any of the band's previous releases". Tony Cummings of Cross Rhythms rated the album a perfect ten, writing that "All in all, pop rock of the finest quality." At CCM Magazine, Chris Well graded the album a B, writing that the release "is a likable collection of simple, fistpumping anthems that should connect particularly with youth groups." Russ Breimeier of Christianity Today rated the album three-and-a-half out of five stars, writing that "There's much to appreciate musically on Audio Adrenaline's latest, but lyrically it falls short." At Christian Broadcasting Network, Chris Carpenter rated the album three spins out of five, writing that "It just lacks the lyrical creativity that fueled previous Audio A standards." Lindsay Whitfield of Soul Shine rated the album three-and-a-half stars out of five, writing that the listener is "in for an action packed good time." At The Phantom Tollbooth, Burton Wray rated the album four tocks of five, writing that "Top to bottom this is the best release from Audio Adrenaline in years", which "This solid release is easily one of the best of the year top to bottom, one of those rare releases where you won't find yourself hitting the skip button."

As of 2007, Christian pop-punk band Hawk Nelson has begun to perform "Clap Your Hands" at live shows. Hawk Nelson toured with Audio Adrenaline in early 2005, when the song was first performed. Audio Adrenaline opened with that song from 2005 until their retirement, and now Hawk Nelson opens with the song.

=== Accolades ===
The album won the Grammy Award for Rock Gospel Album of the Year. It was the second consecutive album to win the award, after Worldwide in 2003. It also spawned the Until My Heart Caves In Tour with Pillar and Sanctus Real.

== Commercial performance ==
The album peaked at No. 122 on Billboard 200 and No. 5 on Billboard's Christian Albums. The song "King" also peaked at No. 19 on Billboard's Christian Songs.

== Track listing ==
All tracks are written by Ben Cissell, Will McGinniss, Bob Herdman, Tyler Burkum and Mark Stuart, except where noted.

No.	Title	Writer(s)	Length
1.	"Clap Your Hands"		3:28
2.	"Until My Heart Caves In"		3:41
3.	"King"		5:01
4.	"Melody (Lost Inside the Wonder)"		4:16
5.	"Starting Over"		4:04
6.	"Are You Ready for Love"		3:31
7.	"Undefeated"		3:36
8.	"You Love Has Lifted Me Higher and Higher"	Gary L. Jackson, Raynard Miner, Carl William Smith	3:36
9.	"Light of the Sun"		3:46
10.	"All Around Me"		3:30
11.	"Losing Control"		4:47
Total length:			43:16

== Personnel ==
Audio Adrenaline

- Mark Stuart – lead vocals, percussion
- Tyler Burkum – lead vocals, keyboards, acoustic guitars, electric guitars
- Will McGinniss – bass
- Ben Cissell – drums, percussion

Additional musicians

- Jay Joyce – keyboards, guitars, drum programming, loops, backing vocals
- John Deaderick – synthesizers (10)
- Brent Milligan – acoustic piano (11)
- Christopher Stevens – Hammond B3 organ (11)
- Mickey Raphael – harmonica (4)
- Jason Hall – additional backing vocals
- Denise Allen, Jason Eskridge and Debi Selby – choir (11)

=== Production ===
- Brent Milligan – executive producer
- Jay Joyce – producer, recording (1–10)
- Audio Adrenaline – producers (11)
- Christopher Stevens – producer (11), recording assistant (11)
- Jason Hall – recording (1–10)
- Aaron Swihart – recording (11)
- Rob Clark – recording assistant (11)
- Mike Paragone – recording assistant (11), mix assistant
- Danny Duncan – choir recording (11)
- Jeff Cain – choir recording assistant (11)
- David Leonard – mixing at East Iris Studios (Nashville, Tennessee)
- Jim DeMain – mastering at Yes Master (Nashville, Tennessee)
- Jan Cook – creative director, art direction
- Tim Frank – art direction
- Asterik Studio, Inc. – design
- Marina Chavez – photography
- Sheila Davis – grooming
- Bradley Wardlaw – grooming
- BrickHouse Entertainment – management
