= Astronomy (Bleach album) =

Studio album by Bleach
- Released: October 21, 2003
- Recorded: 2003 at Compound Recordings, Seattle, WA
- Genre: Christian rock
- Length: 40:07
- Label: Tooth & Nail Records
- Producer: Oran Thornton; Bleach

Bleach chronology
Again, For the First Time (2002)	Astronomy (2003)	Farewell Old Friends (2005)

Professional ratings
Review scores
Source	Rating
Jesus Freak Hideout	4/5 stars

Astronomy is the fifth full-length album by the Christian rock band Bleach. It was released in 2003 under Tooth & Nail Records. This album was dedicated to Captain Josh Byers who was killed in the Iraq War on July 23, 2003. He was the brother of band members Milam Byers and Jared Byers.

== Track listing ==
All songs written by Bleach

1. "Get Up" – 3:10
2. "December" – 2:47
3. "Plan to Pull Through" – 3:40
4. "Jaded Now" – 4:40
5. "Astronomy" – 2:55
6. "Living" – 3:06
7. "Nineteen" – 3:34
8. "Patience" – 3:33
9. "Breakthrough" – 4:21
10. "Tired Heart" – 4:48
11. "Moving On" – 3:13

== Personnel ==
Bleach

- Dave Baysinger
- Sam Barnhart
- Milam Byers
- Jerry Morrison
- Jared Byers

Additional musicians

- Casey Prestwood – steel guitar (10)
- Stogli "Beandip" Wilson – cowbell (11)
- The Leipers Fork Community Orchestra – strings
- Robbie Owen – backing vocals (7)
