= Sound of the Saints =

Studio album by Audio Adrenaline
- Released: May 4, 2015
- Studio: Full Circle Music (Franklin, Tennessee); Ocean Way Nashville, The Hilson Studio, RedRedStudio, House of Phillips and The Cave (Nashville, Tennessee)
- Genre: CCM, pop rock
- Length: 36:22
- Label: Fair Trade, Columbia
- Producer: Seth Mosley; Joshua Silverberg; Nick Baumhardt

Audio Adrenaline chronology
Kings & Queens (2013)	Sound of the Saints (2015)

Sound of the Saints is the tenth and final studio album by Audio Adrenaline and their only album to be released with no original members in the lineup. Fair Trade Services alongside Columbia Records released the album on May 4, 2015. Audio Adrenaline worked with Seth Mosley in the production of this album.

== Background ==
This album follows their 2013 album, Kings & Queens, that was released by Fair Trade Services alongside Columbia Records, just like this album. The album was released on May 4, 2015, and is their tenth and final studio album.

== Critical reception ==
Professional ratings
Review scores
Source	Rating
365 Days of Inspiring Media	4/5 stars
CCM Magazine	3.5/5 stars
Christ Core	9.8/10
Christian Music Review	3.5/5
CM Addict	3/5 stars
Cross Rhythms	8/10 squares
Jesus Freak Hideout	3/5 stars 2.5/5 stars
New Release Tuesday	3.5/5 stars

Justin Sarachik, writing a positive review for Breathecast, says, "Sound of the Saints fluctuates between spurts of pop, worship, pop punk, and EDM, and is sure to get young people interested in worship and Christian music in general." In a three out of five star review by CCM Magazine, Grace S. Aspinwall describes, "Adam Agee... brings a brighter vocal and a crispy musical feel... [that] producer Seth Mosley has crafted a collection that's got a lot to love." Awarding the album three and a half stars, Sarah Fine from New Release Tuesday writes, "there are several bright spots on this project, and each one speaks volumes to what may be to come from this talented group of underdogs." DeWayne Hamby, reviewing the album for Charisma, writes, "Sound of the Saints is an enjoyable collection of encouragement, praise and inspiration that could be poised to propel the band forward and keep the legacy alive for years to come."

Indicating in an eight out of ten review at Cross Rhythms, Tony Cummings says, "there is still much to appreciate" on the album even though Kevin Max has left the band. Jonathan Andre, specifying in a four star review at 365 Days of Inspiring Media, responds, "Whether we see them as Audio Adrenaline or Stellar Kart now, what Adam and the bandmates have done on the album is something remarkable- blending rock, worship, pop, even a bit of punk, to deliver one of the most enjoyable and well-crafted albums of the year so far." Signaling in a three and a half out of five review for Christian Music Review, April Covington describes, "Although Sounds of the Saints has an Audio A feel, the uniqueness and quality doesn't compare with the original." Jon Ownbey, indicating in a three star review for CM Addict, declares, "While the album is good, it's hard to get behind the artists behind the album." Rating the album a 9.8 out of ten at Christ Core, Phillip Noell states, "Sound of the Saints was an excellent album."

Michael Weaver, indicating in a three star review by Jesus Freak Hideout, writes, "it's extremely difficult to listen to Sound of the Saints as an Audio A work." Signaling in a two and a half star review at Jesus Freak Hideout, Roger Gelwicks describes, "And with this lose-lose scenario, Sound of the Saints will lack a positive legacy, memorable for none of the right reasons." Bert Gangl, rating the album three stars for Jesus Freak Hideout, says, " its abundance of tepid, generic-sounding pop/worship material falls decidedly short of the funkier and far more engaging fare generated during vocalist Mark Stuart's tenure in the band, rendering the new effort, at best, a pale reflection of the group's far-superior past projects."

== Track listing ==
No.	Title	Writer(s)	Length
1.	"Move"	Adam Agee, Seth Mosley	3:58
2.	"Love Was Stronger"	Josiah Meeker, Colby Wedgeworth	3:40
3.	"Sound of the Saints"	Agee, Jared Anderson, Mosley, Mark Stuart	3:29
4.	"Out of the Fire"	Agee, Micah Kuiper, Morgan	2:52
5.	"Miracles"	Jeremiah Jones, Morgan	4:00
6.	"Rejoice"	Agee, Josiah Prince, Sam Tinnesz	3:42
7.	"Spirit Burn"	Marc James, Dan Wheeldon	4:18
8.	"Saved My Soul"	Agee, David Moffit, Mosley	2:51
9.	"So Can I"	Eric Arjes, Dan Bremnes, Juan Otero	3:54
10.	"World Changers"	Agee, Kuiper, Morgan	3:38
Total length:			36:22

Reissue track
No.	Title	Length
11.	"Kings & Queens" (The album was re-released on June 29, 2015 with this re-recording of "Kings & Queens" as sung by Adam Agee.)	3:50

== Personnel ==
Audio Adrenaline

- Adam Agee – lead vocals
- Brandon Bagby – guitars, vocals
- Dave Stovall – bass, vocals
- Jack Campbell – drums

== Production ==
- Wes Campbell – executive producer
- Dave Campbell – executive producer
- James Rueger – A&R
- Seth Mosley – producer (1–3, 7, 8), engineer (1–3, 7, 8), editing (1–3, 7, 8)
- Joshua Silverberg – producer (4–6, 9, 10), engineer (4–6, 9, 10)
- Nick Baumhardt – engineer (1–3, 7, 8), producer (8)
- Bobby Campbell – engineer (1–3, 7, 8), editing (1–3, 7, 8)
- Mike "X" O'Connor – engineer (1–3, 7, 8), editing (1–3, 7, 8)
- Ben Phillips – engineer (1–3, 7, 8), editing (1–3, 7, 8)
- Riley Friesen – engineer (4–6, 9, 10), assistant engineer (4–6, 9, 10)
- Micah Kuiper – engineer (4–6, 9, 10), vocal editing (10)
- Sean Power – engineer (4–6, 9, 10)
- Gabe Scott – engineer (4–6, 9, 10)
- Austin Atwood – assistant engineer (1–3, 7, 8)
- Ethan Henley – assistant engineer (1–3, 7, 8)
- Jerricho Scroggins – assistant engineer (1–3, 7, 8), editing (1–3, 7, 8)
- Dave Hagen – editing (1–3, 7, 8)
- Sean Moffitt – mixing
- Dave McNair – mastering at Dave McNair Mastering (Winston-Salem, North Carolina)
- Celi Mosley – production coordinator (1–3, 7, 8)
- Dana Salsedo – art direction
- Joe Cavazos – design
- Jackman Chiu – cover artwork
- Robby Klein – photography

== Charts ==
Chart (2015)	Peak position
US Billboard 200	69
US Christian Albums (Billboard)	1
US Digital Albums (Billboard)	22
US Top Rock Albums (Billboard)	8
