= Audio/Visual =

Greatest hits album by Bleach
- Released: October 25, 2005
- Genre: Christian rock
- Length: 69:58
- Label: Tooth & Nail

Bleach chronology
Farewell Old Friends (2005)	Audio/Visual (2005)

Professional ratings
Review scores
Source	Rating
Jesus Freak Hideout	(CD) (DVD)

Audio/Visual is a greatest hits compilation released by Christian rock band Bleach. It was released in October 2005 by Tooth & Nail Records and includes two new songs, "Good to be Alive" and "Must Be Divine". Bleach's final show, performed on August 29, 2004, in Nashville, Tennessee, is included on a bonus DVD.

== Track listing ==
=== Audio CD ===
1. "Good To Be Alive" – 5:02
2. "Must Be Divine" – 3:45
3. "Epidermis Girl" – 3:58
4. "Perfect Family" – 2:54
5. "Super Good Feeling" – 3:19
6. "All To You" – 4:21
7. "Sun Stands Still" – 5:41
8. "What Will Your Anthem Be" – 5:50
9. "We Are Tomorrow" – 2:52
10. "Knocked Out" – 3:17
11. "Baseline" – 2:47
12. "Get Up" – 3:10
13. "December" – 2:48
14. "Jaded Now" – 4:39
15. "Girlfriend in a Coma" (A cover of The Smiths)– 3:08
16. "Condition" – 3:36
17. "Clear The Air" – 4:13
18. "Farewell Old Friends" – 4:37

=== Bonus DVD ===
1. "Patience"
2. "Perfect Family"
3. "Found You Out"
4. "Rundown Town"
5. "Good"
6. "Land Of The Lost"
7. "Get Up"
8. "We Are Tomorrow"
9. "Baseline"
10. "Super Good Feeling"
11. "Sun Stands Still"
12. "What Will Your Anthem Be?"

The bonus DVD also includes a music video of "We Are Tomorrow", band photos and fan interviews.
