= Bleach (1998 film) =

- Directed by: Bill Platt
- Written by: Bill Platt, A.J. Pierce
- Starring: Gretchen Mol; David Zayas
- Release date: 1998
- Running time: 30 minutes
- Country: United States
- Language: English

Bleach is a 30-minute science fiction film about memory-suppressing drugs. The short film, directed by Bill Platt, won the Directors Guild of America Student Film Award, as well as the gold medal in the narrative category of the 25th Annual Student Academy Awards. The film also played at the 1998 Sundance Film Festival.
