= Bleach (Bleach album) =

Studio album by Bleach
- Released: November 2, 1999
- Genre: Christian rock
- Length: 48:20
- Label: Forefront

Bleach chronology
| Static (1998) | Bleach (1999) | Again, for the First Time (2002) |

Professional ratings
Review scores
| Source | Rating |
|---|---|
| Jesus Freak Hideout | 4/5 stars |
| HM Magazine | (no rating) |

Bleach is the third full-length album by the Christian rock band Bleach. It was released in 1999 under Forefront Records.
