= Know Hope Collective =

- Origin: Franklin, Tennessee, United States
- Genres: CCM, Christian rock, spoken word, testimonial, worship.
- Years active: 2010–2012
- Labels: Integrity/Provident
- Past members: Mark Stuart; Will McGinnis; Julia Ross; David Leonard; Jason Walker; Leslie Jordan

The Know Hope Collective was an American worship and testimonial project formed by Mark Stuart and Will McGinniss, former members of the Grammy Award-winning Christian rock band Audio Adrenaline. Emerging out of the fallout from the disbandment of Audio Adrenaline and Mark Stuart’s personal problems, the project has been described by Stuart and McGinniss, as "an ever-changing group of musicians from a variety of backgrounds who come together to create worship music while sharing their unique experiences and testimonies," and "a ground-breaking initiative that combines worship music with stories of hope and inspiration." Stuart further elaborated it as being "driven from an emerging style of worship and a place of vulnerability. We go on a journey together through the good, bad and ugly to the redemptive side." The project’s self-titled debut album was released March 1, 2011.

== History ==
The idea of Know Hope Collective was birthed in the years following the disbanding of Audio Adrenaline, which was sparked by vocalist Mark Stuart’s divorce and ongoing vocal problems. He and bassist Will McGinniss maintained their friendship after the band dissolved, and though they continued their ministry in the Hands and Feet Project, which was founded by the band to care for orphans in Haiti, they were unsure of their next creative move. Upon the suggestion of their pastor, the two decided to hold campfires at McGinniss’s horse farm with a small church group and share stories and answer questions about Audio Adrenaline and how God was present through all that the band experienced. According to Stuart, "We’d… …talk vulnerably with each other about our successes as well as hardships. It was a time of healing and redemption for us. We felt inspired as we looked back. Around those fires we discovered the evidence of God’s hand in our lives like never before and the importance of telling one’s story."

The fire-side chats apparently resonated deeply with those involved, and so Stuart and McGinniss, upon recommendation by their pastor, took their stories on the road with some new friends and musicians from their home church, hoping to create "an intimate and hope-filled night of music, testimony, and worship." In doing so, the Know Hope Collective was launched, and it has since appeared throughout the United States and Canada, and additional tours are planned.

== Debut album ==
The Know Hope Collective’s self-titled debut album was initially slotted to be released on February 15, 2011, but was delayed until March 1. In addition to Stuart and McGinniss, the album featured the musical talents of Everlife vocalist Julia Ross, All Sons & Daughters members Leslie Jordan and David Leonard (formerly of Jackson Waters and a touring Needtobreathe guitarist), and 2010 BMI Christian Music Award-winning Songwriter of the Year Jason Walker. The album was described as "an intimate pairing of songs and spoken word that plumbs the depths of McGinniss and Stuart's chart-topping heyday and post-band revelations" in which "Stuart speaks far more now than he sings." According to Stuart, "This first project was birthed out of the failure I went through being a singer who lost his voice. But the next one might be on missional living, orphan care or clean water, whatever God is leading us to." Stylistically it has been labeled as a worship album, with the sound of the band in the classic and alternative rock mode, "somewhat reminiscent of U2 and Evanescence."

== Hiatus & Break-up (2012) ==
Know Hope Collective broke up after Christian rock band Audio Adrenaline reformed in 2012.

== Line-up ==
=== On Know Hope Collective ===
- Mark Stuart - lead vocals, percussion
- Will McGinniss - bass guitar, vocals
- Julia Ross - vocals
- David Leonard - lead guitar, piano
- Leslie Jordan - vocals, guitar, cello
- Jason Walker - keyboards, vocals, guitar
