= Bleach (British band) =

English rock band

- Bleach, 1991

Background information
- Origin: Ipswich, England
- Genres: Shoegazing
- Years active: 1989–1993
- Labels: Dali/Chameleon; Musidisc; Way Cool/Artlos
- Members: Salli Carson; Steve Scott; Neil Singleton; Nick Singleton

Bleach were an English indie rock band from Ipswich, usually considered part of the shoegazing genre. The band was formed in 1989 by brothers Neil and Nick Singleton (guitar and bass, respectively) together with drummer Steve Scott and vocalist Salli Carson. Their first release was the Eclipse EP in 1990, followed in 1991 by the Snag EP. The tracks from these two EPs were collected on an album in 1991. They recorded two Peel sessions, in 1990 and 1991, which were broadcast on BBC Radio One. 1992 saw the release of the full-length album Killing Time, and the single "Shotgun", a surprising mixture of shoegazing and rap. In 1993 the band released two separate mini-albums, Hard and Fast. The group disbanded shortly thereafter.

The band reunited for two live shows in summer 2015; one a private event and one in their original hometown of Ipswich on 27 June, at St Peter's by the Waterfront.

== Discography ==
=== Singles/EPs ===
- Eclipse EP (1990) Way Cool/Artlos UK no. 195
- Snag EP (1991) Way Cool/Artlos UK no. 103
- "Shotgun" (1992) Musidisc UK no. 107

=== Albums ===
- Bleach (1991) Artlos
- Killing Time (1992) Musidisc
- Hard (1992) Musidisc
- Fast (1993) Musidisc
