= Bleach (American band) =

American Christian rock band

- Origin: Grayson, Kentucky, U.S.
- Genres: Christian rock
- Years active: 1995–2004, 2010–present
- Labels: Tooth & Nail, ForeFront, BEC
- Members: Davy Baysinger; Milam Byers; Jared Byers; Samuel Barnhart; Jerry Morrison; Pete Prevost
- Past members: Matt Gingerich; Bradley Ford; Todd Kirby; Russ Fox

Bleach is an American Christian rock band based in Nashville, Tennessee.

== History ==
Bleach was formed at Kentucky Christian University in Grayson, Kentucky, in 1995, originally under the name Muffin.

In 1997, the band earned a Dove Award in the category of Modern Rock Recorded Song of the Year for its song "Epidermis Girl", from its first album Space. The follow-up album, Static, reached No. 22 on the Billboard Top Christian Albums chart.

In 2004, the band members announced that they were disbanding. The band said goodbye to its fans in the form of a farewell tour, which was followed by the final album Farewell Old Friends released March 1, 2005. Their "last show" was performed on August 29, 2004, in Nashville, but on March 13, 2005, the band performed a reunion show to benefit the Aaron Marrs Memorial Fund. It also performed a reunion show at The O.C. Supertones's last show, at Biola University on October 7, 2005.

"Super Good Feeling" is on the Seltzer 2 album, "Waving Goodbye" on the Seltzer 3 album and a cover of dc Talk's "Heavenbound" on the Forefront Ten album. In 2010, Bleach reunited.

Davy Baysinger and Jared Byers have a side project band: Royal Empire Music. They have written songs for a compilation CD series called My Other Band for Mono vs. Stereo records. Russ Fox is now playing guitar in the rock band The Red Velvet and runs Huntington's Broadmoor Recording Studio.

Additionally, they made an appearance at the Cornerstone Festival in 2010, and at the Sonshine Festival in July 2010.

The band started their "Four States Tour" in July 2011 and began work on an EP which was never released. The band has maintained an active social media site and reunites to plays shows periodically. Most notably the "Rock 2 Adopt" acoustic show and auction May 23, 2017, with MercyMe, Plumb and Rhett Walker and "Journey Fest" July 17, 2021.

== Appearances in media ==
- Bleach's music is featured in the Christian video game Dance Praise. The songs "Heartbeat", "Rock N Roll", "Static" and "Super Good Feeling" are included with the game.
- "Heartbeat" is used in the romantic comedy film Extreme Days (2001) and in its accompanying soundtrack.
- "Rock N Roll" is used in the second season of teen drama television series Dawson's Creek (episode 16), "Static" in the third season (episode 4), and "Super Good Feeling" the third season (episode 6).
- "We Are Tomorrow" was used on ESPN's SportsCenter in 2003.
- "Broke in the Head" is used in the first season of the television series Roswell (episode 8) and "Knocked Out" in the second season (episode 13) titled "Disturbing Behavior".
- "Good as Gold" is used in the third season of the "CW" show One Tree Hill (episode 7).

== Members ==
Current

- Davy Baysinger – singer (1995–2004, 2010–present)
- Sam Barnhart – guitar, vocals (1995–2004, 2010–present)
- Jerry Morrison – bass guitar (1995–2004, 2010–present)
- Milam Byers – lead guitar (2002–2004, 2010–present)
- Jared Byers – drums, loops, pan flute (2002–2004, 2010–present)
- Pete Prevost – guitar (2025–present)

== Discography ==
Title	Year	Label
Space	1996	ForeFront
Static	1998	ForeFront
Bleach	1999	ForeFront
Again, for the First Time	2002	Tooth & Nail
Astronomy	2003	Tooth & Nail
Farewell Old Friends	2005	Tooth & Nail
Audio/Visual (compilation)	2005	Tooth & Nail
