= Worldwide (Audio Adrenaline album) =

Studio album by Audio Adrenaline
- Released: February 25, 2003
- Studio: Ocean Way Nashville (Nashville, Tennessee); Dark Horse Recording, Sound Kitchen, F.M.2 and West Main Studios (Franklin, Tennessee); East McKnight Studio (Murfreesboro, Tennessee); Art House Studios (Miami, Florida)
- Genre: Christian rock
- Length: 40:36
- Label: ForeFront
- Producer: Charlie Peacock; Jason Burkum

Audio Adrenaline chronology
| Lift (2001) | Worldwide (2003) | Until My Heart Caves In (2005) |

Worldwide is the seventh full-length album released by Audio Adrenaline in 2003.

The album won 2004 Grammy Award for Best Rock Gospel Album.

== Critical reception ==
Professional ratings
Review scores
| Source | Rating |
|---|---|
| AllMusic | 4/5 stars |
| Jesus Freak Hideout | 4/5 stars |

The album was well received by critics. Steve Losey, of AllMusic, gave the album 4 stars out of 5 while praising both Mark Stuart's vocals and Tyler Burkum's playing. John DiBiase, of Jesus Freak Hideout, gave the album 3.5 stars out of 5, writing that the album "offers some of the most memorable moments for the band". Despite criticizing the track "Start a Fire" for contrasting too much with the rest of the album, DiBiase closes his review by saying "Worldwide is a great album to start off a promising year for releases in CCM and will easily be one of the best projects of 2003".

== Commercial performance ==
The album peaked at No. 116 on Billboard 200.

== Music videos ==
Two live music videos were released for the songs "Church Punks" and "Leaving Ninety-Nine".

== Track listing ==
All tracks are written by Tyler Burkum, Ben Cissell, Bob Herdman, Will McGinniss and Mark Stuart, except where noted.

| No. | Title | Writer(s) | Length |
|---|---|---|---|
| 1. | "Worldwide: One" | | 3:23 |
| 2. | "Church Punks" | | 1:45 |
| 3. | "Dirty" | | 3:00 |
| 4. | "Go and Be" | Charlie Peacock, Burkum, Cissell, Herdman, McGinniss, Stuart | 3:08 |
| 5. | "Pierced^{[a]}" | | 3:43 |
| 6. | "Strong" | | 3:19 |
| 7. | "Pour Your Love Down" | | 4:12 |
| 8. | "Leaving 99^{[a]}" | | 3:26 |
| 9. | "Miracle^{[a]}" | | 3:14 |
| 10. | "Worldwide: Two" | | 3:14 |
| 11. | "Start a Fire" | | 3:53 |
| 12. | "Ocean Floor" (Radio Remix) | | 4:15 |
| Total length: | | | 40:32 |

Note

- ^{a} appears on Adios: The Greatest Hits

== Personnel ==
Audio Adrenaline

- Mark Stuart – vocals, percussion
- Tyler Burkum – Rhodes electric piano, additional keyboards, guitars, vocals
- Will McGinniss – bass
- Ben Cissell – drums

Additional musicians

- Nathan Dantzler – programming (1, 6, 7, 12)
- Charlie Peacock – acoustic piano (3–5, 9, 10), backing vocals (3–5, 9, 10), string arrangements (3–5, 9, 10)
- Blair Masters – Hammond B3 organ (3–5, 9, 10)
- David Larring – programming (3–5, 9, 10)
- Michael-Anthony "Mooki" Taylor – programming (3–5, 9, 10)
- Dave Alan – organ (6)
- Mike Lee – acoustic piano (12), additional backing vocals (12)
- Sam Ashworth – acoustic guitar (3–5, 9, 10), bass (3–5, 9, 10), backing vocals (3–5, 9, 10)
- John Hammond – drums (3–5, 9, 10)
- Timothy "Yogi" Watts – drums (3–5, 9, 10)
- Jason Burkum – percussion (1, 2, 6–8, 11), backing vocals (1, 2, 6–8, 11)
- Ken Lewis – percussion (3–5, 9, 10)
- Anthony LaMarchina – cello (1, 2, 6–8, 11)
- David Davidson – violin (1, 2, 6–8, 11), strings (3–5, 9, 10)
- David Angell – strings (3–5, 9, 10)
- Bob Mason – strings (3–5, 9, 10)
- David Burkum – string arrangements and conductor (7, 8)
- Lisa Apple – additional vocals (1)
- Darwin Hobbs – backing vocals (3–5, 9, 10)
- Leanne Palmore – backing vocals (3–5, 9, 10)
- Darryn Ray – backing vocals (3–5, 9, 10)
- Kimberly Washington – backing vocals (3–5, 9, 10)
- Tanjala Wright – backing vocals (3–5, 9, 10)
- Marcia Ware – additional vocals (11)

== Production ==
- Greg Ham – executive producer
- Mark Nicholas – executive producer, A&R
- Jason Burkum – producer (1, 2, 6–8, 11)
- Charlie Peacock – producer (3–5, 9, 10)
- Audio Adrenaline – producers (12)
- Nathan Dantzler – recording (1, 2, 6–8), mixing (2)
- Bill Deaton – engineer (3–5, 9, 10)
- Aaron Swihart – engineer (12)
- Julian Kindred – additional recording (1, 2, 6–8)
- Richie Biggs – overdub engineer (3–5, 9, 10), additional tracking (3–5, 9, 10), editing (3–5, 9, 10)
- Joe Baldridge – mixing (1, 7, 8)
- Shane D. Wilson – mixing (3–5, 9, 10)
- Tony Palacios – mixing (6, 11, 12)
- Joe Costa – mix assistant (1, 7, 8)
- Chris Henning – mix assistant (3–5, 9, 10)
- Adam Deane – mix assistant (6, 11)
- J.C. Monterrosa – mix assistant (6, 11)
- Richard Dodd – mastering
- Amy Guenthner – A&R coordinator
- Susannah Parrish – creative coordinator
- Scott McDaniel – art direction
- Burkom – design
- Kerri McKeehan-Stuart – photography
- Sam Shifley – photography assistant
- BrickHouse Entertainment – management
