= Don't Censor Me =

1993 album by Audio Adrenaline

Studio album by Audio Adrenaline
- Released: October 1, 1993
- Recorded: 1993
- Studios: Gaga Studios and Fun Attic Studio (Franklin, Tennessee); Sound Stage Studios (Nashville, Tennessee)
- Genres: Christian rock, funk rock
- Length: 42:39
- Label: ForeFront
- Producers: Steve Griffith; The Gotee Brothers

Audio Adrenaline chronology
| Audio Adrenaline (1992) | Don't Censor Me (1993) | Live Bootleg (1995) |

Don't Censor Me is the second studio album by Audio Adrenaline, released on ForeFront Records on October 1, 1993. The album features the track "Big House", which is considered the band's most popular song.

== Background and concept ==
According to the band, the album is aimed at a young audience like they were at the time. In an interview with CCM Magazine in 1996, they described the songs as "cheerleader songs" for their upbeat and cheerful rhythms. In the same interview, the band agrees that Don't Censor Me better approached the style and concept they wanted, when compared to their first album, but "it still didn't hit the mark".

== Recording ==
Don't Censor Me was recorded in 1993 at various studios in Tennessee, Gaga Studios and Fun Attic, both in Franklin. Steve Griffith and Joe Baldridge were in charge of recording. Griffith, Baldridge, and Dave Frank were also in charge of the mixing, some of which was done at SoundStage, in Nashville, Tennessee. The mastering was done by Hank Williams at MasterMix in Nashville.

== Reception ==
Professional ratings
Review scores
| Source | Rating |
|---|---|
| AllMusic | 3/5 stars |
| Jesus Freak Hideout | 3.5/5 stars |

Don't Censor Me was well received by the audience, selling more than 250,000 copies. Thom Granger, of AllMusic, gave the album 3 stars out of 5 calling it "more pop-savvy". Paul Portell, of Jesus Freak Hideout, gave the album 3.5 stars out of 5. Portell wrote that the album "showcases the band's rising maturity both lyrically and musically" and that it "may not be Audio Adrenaline's best effort, but at the same time a stepping stone in the band's growth spiritually and musically". Portell also compared their style to Collective Soul, Maroon 5, and John Mayer.

The album produced the hit singles "Can't Take God Away" and "Big House". The latter reached number 1 on Christian radio, and is often regarded one of the band's biggest hits of their career. It received the Song of the Decade title from CCM Magazine for the 1990s.

== Music videos ==
Music videos were made for the songs "A.K.A. Public School", "Big House", and "We're a Band". dc Talk appeared as three "cool guys" in the video for "A.K.A. Public School".

== Track listing ==
All tracks are written by Barry Blair, Bob Herdman, Will McGinniss, Mark Stuart except where noted.

| No. | Title | Length |
|---|---|---|
| 1. | "Can't Take God Away^{[a]}" (writers: Toby McKeehan, Todd Collins, Blair, Herdman, Stuart, McGinniss) | 3:59 |
| 2. | "A.K.A. Public School" | 3:32 |
| 3. | "Soulmate^{[a]}" | 3:37 |
| 4. | "My World View" (cameo appearance by Kevin Smith) | 4:24 |
| 5. | "Big House^{[a]}" | 3:33 |
| 6. | "Jesus & the California Kid" | 2:55 |
| 7. | "Don't Censor Me^{[a]}" | 3:15 |
| 8. | "Let Love" | 4:35 |
| 9. | "We're a Band^{[a]}" | 4:02 |
| 10. | "Rest Easy^{[a]}" | 4:42 |
| 11. | "Scum Sweetheart^{[a]}" | 4:09 |
| Total length: | | 42:39 |

^{a} Live recording later appeared on Live Bootleg (1995)

== Personnel ==
Audio Adrenaline

- Mark Stuart – vocals
- Bob Herdman – keyboards
- Barry Blair – guitars
- Will McGinniss – bass

Additional musicians

- Blair Masters – musician (1, 9)
- Todd Collins – musician (1, 9), backing vocals (1, 9)
- Steve Griffith – musician (2–8, 10, 11), backing vocals (2–8, 10, 11)
- Dave Frank – musician (2–8, 10, 11), backing vocals (2–8, 10, 11)
- Tony Miracle – musician (2–8, 10, 11)
- Greg Herrington – musician (2–8, 10, 11)
- Nicole Coleman-Mullen – backing vocals (1, 9)
- Jimmie Lee Sloas – backing vocals (1, 9), vocal arrangements (1)
- Kevin Smith (of DC Talk) – cameo appearance (4)

Production

- Eddie DeGarmo – executive producer
- Dan R. Brock – executive producer
- The Gotee Brothers – producers (1, 9), mixing (1, 9)
- Steve Griffith – producer (2–8, 10, 11), engineer (2–8, 10, 11), mixing (2–8, 10, 11)
- Joe Baldridge – engineer (1, 9), mixing (1, 9)
- Dave Frank – mixing (2–8, 10, 11)
- David Hall – assistant mix engineer (1, 9)
- Hank Williams – mastering at MasterMix (Nashville, Tennessee)
- Joan Miller – production assistant (1, 9)
- Jeff Frazier – photography
- Jeff and Lisa Franke – design
- Carol Maxwell – make-up

== Don't Censor Me: Extended Play Remixes ==
Don't Censor Me: Extended Play Remixes was released in 1994. The EP contains two remixes of "Can't Take God Away" and one each of "We're a Band" and "Big House". "Big House (Aquatic Dub Mix)" was remixed by Ian Eskelin; the remaining three tracks were remixed by Scott Blackwell.

Don't Censor Me: Extended Play Remixes

EP by Audio Adrenaline
- Released: 1994
- Genre: Christian rock
- Length: 22:44
- Label: ForeFront

| No. | Title | Length |
|---|---|---|
| 1. | "Can't Take God Away (Eternal Life Mix)" | 5:54 |
| 2. | "Can't Take God Away (House Mix)" | 6:42 |
| 3. | "We're a Band (Hardcore Mix)" | 6:00 |
| 4. | "Big House (Aquatic Dub Mix)" | 4:08 |
| Total length: | | 22:44 |
