= Audio Adrenaline =

Christian rock band

- Original band members, 1996

Background information
- Also known as: A-180 (1986–1990), Audio A
- Origin: Kentucky Christian University in Grayson, Kentucky
- Genres: Christian rock, alternative rock, contemporary Christian music
- Years active: 1986–2007, 2012–2017
- Labels: ForeFront, Fair Trade
- Past members: Brian Hayes; Jason Walker; Dave Ghazarian; Mark Stuart; Tyler Burkum; Ben Cissell; Brian Whitman; Bob Herdman; Barry Blair; David Stuart; Phil Vaughan; Jonathan Schneck; Ron Gibson; Kevin Max; Jared Byers; Will McGinniss; Dwayne Larring; Josh Engler; Adam Agee; Dave Stovall; Brandon Bagby; Jack Campbell
- Website: www.audioa.com (defunct and sold)

Audio Adrenaline was an American Christian rock band that formed in 1986 at Kentucky Christian University in Grayson, Kentucky. The band gained recognition during the 1990s and received two Grammy Awards and multiple Dove Awards. Audio Adrenaline were regular performers at the annual Creation Festival, Spirit West Coast festival, Agape Music Festival, and Alive Festival. In 2007, the group disbanded due to lead singer Mark Stuart's spasmodic dysphonia.

After a hiatus, the band reformed in 2012 with only bassist Will McGinniss returning from the original line-up. The new Audio Adrenaline was fronted by Kevin Max, formerly of DC Talk, as the new lead vocalist. This new line-up released Kings & Queens on March 12, 2013. In June 2014, Max stepped down as lead singer of the band. He was replaced by Josh Engler, a former member of the band Abandon until February 2015 when Adam Agee of Stellar Kart was offered and accepted the role.

In 2015, McGinniss departed from the band, leaving no original members left in the lineup. The first single of the new Audio Adrenaline, "Love Was Stronger", was released in 2015 and was included on Sound of the Saints, their tenth and final studio album.

== History ==
=== 1986–1990: Formation as A-180 ===
The band was formed as A-180 in 1986 at Kentucky Christian University by Mark Stuart (lead vocals), Barry Blair (guitars), Will McGinniss (bass), Dave Stuart (keyboards), and Brian Hayes (drums).

Herdman had written a song entitled "My God". The song was described in a CCM Magazine article as "a curious marriage of heavy metal and rap". After the song was recorded by A-180, a demo tape was sent to radio stations. The song quickly scaled the charts. Following this, the song caught the attention of Toby McKeehan (from dc Talk), who brought it to the executives at ForeFront Records. The label decided to offer a record deal to A-180 but had them change their name to Audio Adrenaline, a name that Herdman had come up with previously.

=== 1991–1993: Record deal with ForeFront and first albums ===
After signing their deal with Forefront, the band started writing and recording demo songs similar to "My God" for the first album. The band has described this period as one of adaptation and experimentation since ForeFront wanted a hip-hop act. As a result, Dave Stuart and Ron Gibson left the band. Singer Mark Stuart said in an interview "We had no idea what we were doing. Forefront signed us to do this rap/metal stuff, and we only had one song" while original guitarist Barry Blair said "We thought 'If they liked My God, we'll send them more songs like that." Blair added that it was a "big, long process of getting to where we are now, of creating music we like, not music we think is what they [ForeFront] would like."

The band's first Forefront album was the self-titled Audio Adrenaline, released in 1992. Filled with drum machine beats, rap and hip-hop it eventually went out of print. It included "DC-10", the only track from the original A-180 recordings (live drums) and was well received selling 75,000 copies. However, the band was not happy with the result. Blair was quoted as saying:

If it was up to me, I would burn them all, make them disappear. It did well, it sold 75,000 units. But a lot of people don't understand. It is more than about it being a good record. It's about it being a true representation of us. There is nothing personal about that record.

— Barry Blair, CCM Magazine

The follow-up album, Don't Censor Me, came the next year and featured what is considered the biggest hit of the band, "Big House". The album sold 250,000 copies and launched the band into stardom. The album also includes the song "We're a Band", which remained one of their live staples. Next the band released Live Bootleg.

Although Don't Censor Me leaned more towards rock, the band still was not happy. Stuart said of the songs "there are really only a few songs I love to play live. I like to do 'Big House,' 'We're a Band' and 'Scum Sweetheart.'" On the other hand, most of the band members disliked "Jesus and the California Kid" which Stuart referred to as "pure agony". Still, the album earned them their first Dove Award for Long Form Music Video of the Year for "Big House", as well as a Billboard Music Award Nomination.

=== 1994–1999: Maturity and success ===
As a result of the success of Don't Censor Me, Audio Adrenaline went on tour opening for DC Talk on the Free at Last Tour and Newsboys' Going Public Tour. However, on interviews the band expressed their interest to grow beyond the shadow of their musical counterparts.

Up until this point it's been great to be in their shadow. It's a great shadow to be in. But at a certain level it really does need to change to be where we grow into our own. We deal with this a lot with the record label. When you are on a record label with one of the [fastest-rising] Christian bands of all time, you are always going to be in the shadow. We would like to be recognized as Audio Adrenaline instead of 'the band that opens for DC Talk.’

— Mark Stuart, CCM Magazine

In 1996, their third studio album, Bloom, was released. The album featured the band returning to their original rock roots, as opposed to their experiments with rap music. Many reviewers praised the band's decision to change and referred to the album as showcasing the maturity in the band members.

Bloom was a huge hit becoming (in 1999) the only album of the band to be certified gold by RIAA. It also marked guitarist Blair's final album, who decided to become a music producer. In a 2015 interview with Breathecast, Blair talked about his reasons to leave citing his love of "the creative part of writing, recording, being in the studio, putting songs together" as the main factor. In the interview, he refers to the Bloom album as something he was "exceptionally proud of", and how he knew he was creating something that had "meaning and will touch people". Blair also added how his interest started to move away from the touring aspect until he "decided to make the jump to see if I can sink or swim as a producer".

With Blair gone, Audio Adrenaline needed a new guitarist. They found a temporary fill-in with Brian McSweeney (from Seven Day Jesus), but he decided to stay with his full-time act. They then turned the guitars over to Tyler Burkum, who joined the band at only 17 years of age, just in time to record some guitars on the band's next album, Some Kind of Zombie. The album, released in 1997, included a song from Barry Blair and was the first to feature Ben Cissell as the band's full-time drummer, though Cissell had played percussion on their previous album.

In 1999, the band released Underdog, its fifth studio album. Songwriter Bob Herdman called the album "more fun" than the previous one, while bassist Will McGinniss said how they wanted to "explore more artistically", while merging "ideas from the last three records". The album includes a remake of the band's own "DC-10", which was originally featured in their first album, but this time using a swing style. The album was well received by critics, while peaking at #76 on Billboard. After the release, the band also opened for dc Talk on the Jesus Freak World Tour.

=== 2000–2007: Last albums with original members and retirement ===
After a short break, Audio Adrenaline released their first greatest hits compilation, Hit Parade, in March 2001. Included in the album are three of their most popular songs, "Big House", "Hands and Feet", and the live staple "We're A Band", as well as a song with The O.C. Supertones, "Blitz", from the album Some Kind of Zombie. It was at this time that Herdman left the band to become president of a new record label, Flicker Records, which he co-founded along with Stuart and McGinniss.

In November 2001, the band released a new studio album, Lift which several critics have classified as the band's best. Lift also marked the first time that guitarist Burkum shared lead vocals with Stuart. The band then followed with their ninth album, Worldwide, released in 2003. Worldwide went on to win a Grammy Award for Best Rock Gospel Album in 2004, the first of two Grammys for the band. In 2004, the band, along with Herdman, founded a project in Haiti called the Hands and Feet Project, in which the band built an orphanage for children.

The band's tenth studio album, Until My Heart Caves In, was released on August 30, 2005. The album featured most of the lead vocals by Burkum, with only a few sung by Stuart. Until My Heart Caves In received another Grammy Award for Best Rock Gospel Album in 2006. "Clap Your Hands" was also played on ESPN with football game highlights.

On January 18, 2006, Audio Adrenaline announced that they were retiring from active music ministry and cited Stuart's "ongoing vocal challenges" stemming from vocal cord damage as the primary factor. On July 27, 2006, the band played at the popular Christian music Creation Festival, where they had performed every year since the group formed, for the last time with their original lineup. On August 1, 2006, they released their final compilation album, Adios: The Greatest Hits, a farewell album containing two new tracks as well as a selection of the band's greatest hits to date.

For their final national tour in early 2007, Audio Adrenaline opened for MercyMe on their "Coming Up to Breathe Tour". The tour concluded on April 28, 2007, at the Waikiki Shell in Honolulu, Hawaii. Their final project, Live From Hawaii: The Farewell Concert, was released on August 28, 2007, as a live CD–DVD combo and earned two nominations at the 39th GMA Dove Awards, winning Long Form Music Video of the Year.

=== 2008–2011: Other projects ===
After the band's retirement, their members dedicated their time to other projects. Mark Stuart and Will McGinniss started a project called Know Hope Collective, which features a changing group of musicians singing worship songs and presenting testimonies. They both have also been working extensively with The Hands and Feet Project in Haiti. Tyler Burkum has been playing for several bands and as a session musician. He also started his own band called The Leagues. Ben Cissell ran a skate club/youth ministry venue called Rocketttown, and then started pursuing film work. Finally, Bob Herdman has been working as a Project Manager for several companies in the Nashville area.

The group played a reunion performance at Easterfest '09 in Queens Park, Toowoomba, Australia.

=== 2012–2017: Reformation and new singers ===
In 2012, former members Stuart and McGinniss, along with the band's new manager Wes Campbell, decided to re-launch the band with a new line-up. According to them, one of their options was to ask Kevin Max, formerly of DC Talk, to be the new lead vocalist. Max, who had worked with Audio Adrenaline previously, said it was "a no-brainer" for him when they approached him.

"I'm just really super excited. These are guys I look up to ... The only [question] that I had in the whole scenario was: 'What's this going to be like musically?'"

— Kevin Max, Billboard

In addition to Max as the new lead vocalist, the band also added Dave Ghazarian of Superchick on the guitar, Jared Byers of Bleach on the drums, Jason Walker on the keyboard, and McGinniss on bass. Former singer Stuart remained as producer and songwriter. On March 3, 2013, Audio Adrenaline released Kings and Queens. The album peaked at No. 70 on the Billboard 200 chart, and No. 4 on the Christian Albums chart. Aside of its chart performance, Kings & Queens received praise from critics who referred to it as "possibly the greatest comeback project in Christian music today" and a "fresh album that will keep both old and new fans alike".

In 2013, Dave Ghazarian and Jason Walker left the band, and were replaced by Dwayne Larring formerly of Sonicflood. In June 2014, Kevin Max also stepped down as lead vocalist. In an interview with Jesus Freak Hideout, Max said the decision was "amicable" and cited a difference of opinion in terms of the band's musical future as the reason for his departure. According to Max, the band's management wanted to move the band towards a more "worship music mode", even becoming the house band for the Acquire the Fire events, whereas he was more interested in a more "alternative or indie pop rock" style.

I felt like I didn't really fit the worship music leader mode and they agreed ... It became pretty apparent that we were on separate paths when it came to musicality and creativity ... To add to that, I wanted to push the envelope with the band musically. I wanted to create art on the level of The Killers, Switchfoot, Coldplay, U2, etc. I think that eventually, the band was at a place where it needed to evolve. Management decided to go a different direction... I had to be honest and realize that I probably didn't fit what they wanted to do.

— Kevin Max, JesusFreakHideout

Max was temporarily replaced by Josh Engler from Abandon who transitioned in taking on vocal duties. In February 2015, drummer Jared Byers left the band to pursue other interests, but was followed by Dwayne Larring, Engler and founder Will McGinniss. McGinniss wrote a statement in which he called the last years "an incredible blast and honor", but cited his desire to work more fully with the Hands & Feet Project as his reason to leave the band. His departure left the band with no original members remaining.

On February 10, 2015, Adam Agee, lead singer of Christian rock band Stellar Kart announced that he would assume the role of lead singer for the band along with guitarist Brandon Bagby to replace Larring, bassist Dave Stovall to replace McGinniss, and drummer Jack Campbell to replace Byers. In February 2015, the band released "Love Was Stronger", the lead single from the album Sound of the Saints.

Following their 2017 tour, the band has not released any updates, though a dissolution was not formally announced.

In 2019, Mark Stuart released Losing My Voice to Find It, reflecting on his time in Audio Adrenaline, losing his ability to sing, and the time after.

In 2023, Agee joined the Newsboys as a bassist and additional guitarist and became lead vocalist in 2025 following the departure of previous lead vocalist Michael Tait.

== Band members ==
- Will McGinniss – vocals, bass guitar (1986–2007, 2012–2015)
- Mark Stuart – lead vocals, guitar (1986–2007)
- Barry Blair – guitar, vocals (1986–1996)
- Dave Stuart – keyboards, vocals (1986, 1991)
- Phil Vaughan — drums (1986–1988)
- Ron Gibson – drums (1988–1991)
- Bob Herdman – keyboard, guitar, vocals (1991–2001)
- Ben Cissell – drums (1995–2007)
- Tyler Burkum – guitar, vocals, keyboard (1997–2007)
- Dave Ghazarian – guitar (2012–2013)
- Jason Walker – keyboards, vocals, guitar (2012–2013)
- Kevin Max – lead vocals (2012–2014)
- Jared Byers – drums, vocals (2012–2015)
- Josh Engler – lead vocals, keyboard (2014–2015)
- Dwayne Larring – guitar, vocals (2013–2015)
- Adam Agee – lead vocals (2015–2017)
- Dave Stovall – bass guitar, vocals (2015–2017)
- Jack Campbell – drums (2015–2017)
- Brandon Bagby – guitar, vocals (2015–2017)

Touring musicians

- Brian Hayes – drums (1993–1995)
- Jon Knox – drums (1995 replacing Brian Hayes on various dates before Ben Cissell joined)
- Brian Whitman – guitar, vocals (2005–2007)
- David Stuart – keyboard, vocals (1986–1991)
- Ron Gibson – drums (1988–1991)
- Jonathan Schneck – backup guitar, backing vocals (2003–2005)
- Brian McSweeney – guitar, vocals (1996–97, replacing Barry Blair; 2007, filled in for Tyler Burkum for final shows)
- Jared Byers – drums (2007, filled in for Ben Cissell for final shows)
- Mike Biddle – keyboards, backing vocals (2009)

Timeline

== Other projects ==
On September 1, 2003, the band released its first book Dirty Faith: Becoming the Hands and Feet of Jesus, with Think Books. Co-written with Mark Matlock, the book discusses reaching out to the needy and features an organization called Mission Year.

In 2003, Mark Stuart was involved in !Hero the Rock opera, playing Petrov. !Hero was a modern adaption of the story of Christ. Also involved in this production were Michael Tait as HERO, CCM pop vocalist Rebecca St. James as Maggie, Skillet's John Cooper as Kai, the chief Rabbi, and rapper T-Bone as Jairus.

On September 5, 2006, the band released Hands & Feet: Inspiring Stories and Firsthand Accounts of God Changing Lives, with Regal Books. It takes the reader on a journey to Haiti with the band as they build houses for the children there. The reader also meets Drex and Jo Stuart, the parents of frontman Mark Stuart. The book gives an explanation of life in one of the poorest nations on earth. It also tells of the band's building of The Hands and Feet Project (an orphanage for poor, hungry children).

in 2007, Stuart and Will McGinniss launched "Audio Unplugged" (also known as "Audio Talks"), a post-retirement speaking venture that offers "a night of encouragement, testimonies, Audio A classics and worship."

== Discography ==
Original era

- Audio Adrenaline (1992)
- Don't Censor Me (1993)
- Bloom (1996)
- Some Kind of Zombie (1997)
- Underdog (1999)
- Lift (2001)
- Worldwide (2003)
- Until My Heart Caves In (2005)

Reboot era

- Kings & Queens (2013)
- Sound of the Saints (2015)

== Awards and nominations ==
=== Grammy Awards ===
Year	Award	Result
1997	Best Rock Gospel Album (Bloom)	Nominated
1999	Best Rock Gospel Album (Some Kind of Zombie)	Nominated
2000	Best Rock Gospel Album (Underdog)	Nominated
2003	Best Rock Gospel Album (Lift)	Nominated
2004	Best Rock Gospel Album (Worldwide)	Won
2006	Best Rock Gospel Album (Until My Heart Caves In)	Won

=== GMA Dove Awards ===
Year	Award	Result
1996	Long Form Music Video of the Year ("Big House")	Won
1998	Modern Rock Recorded Song of the Year ("Some Kind of Zombie")	Won
2000	Rock Recorded Song of the Year ("Get Down")	Won
2002	Rock Recorded Song of the Year ("Will Not Fade)	Nominated
2003	Group of the Year	Nominated
2003	Pop/Contemporary Recorded Song of the Year ("Ocean Floor")	Nominated
2003	Rock Album of the Year (Lift)	Won
2004	Rock Recorded Song of the Year ("Dirty")	Nominated
2004	Rock/Contemporary Album of the Year (Worldwide)	Nominated
2004	Long Form Music Video of the Year (Alive)	Nominated
2008	Rock Album of the Year (Live from Hawaii: The Farewell Concert)	Nominated
2008	Long Form Music Video of the Year (Live from Hawaii: The Farewell Concert)	Won
