= Big House (song) =

Single by Audio Adrenaline

from the album Don't Censor Me
- Released: 1993
- Genre: Christian rock
- Length: 3:38
- Label: ForeFront
- Songwriters: Barry Blair, Bob Herdman, Will McGinniss, Mark Stuart

"Big House" is a song by Christian rock band Audio Adrenaline, from their 1993 album Don't Censor Me. The song reached number 1 on Christian radio and is often regarded one of the band's biggest hits of their career. It won the 1996 GMA Dove Award for Long Form Music Video of the Year, and received the Song of the Decade title from CCM Magazine for the 1990s.

In 1998, the song was recorded by Seven Day Jesus for a ForeFront Records compilation album celebrating the tenth anniversary of the record label. The album featured classic songs from ForeFront artists performed and updated by other artists. In 2021, a new edition of the song was featured in the movie A Week Away.
