= Bob Herdman =

- Birth name: Robert "Bob" Vaughn Herdman
- Born: March 8, 1966 (age 59)
- Genres: Christian rock, Rock
- Occupations: Musician; singer; songwriter; web developer
- Instrument(s): Vocals, guitars, keyboards
- Years active: 1987–present

Robert Vaughn Herdman (born March 8, 1966) is a Christian musician, songwriter and producer more known for being a member of the band Audio Adrenaline.

== Life and career ==
Herdman grew up in Lynchburg, a rural town in the southwest part of Ohio. At 17 Herdman joined the elite Army Rangers. During his time in the Rangers Herdman had several parachuting accidents which resulted in minor injuries and broken bones. He was also involved in a helicopter crash that resulted in no injuries. After completing Ranger School, Special forces Combat Diver School and other specialty schools, Herdman decided to end his time in the military after four years.

After leaving the Army, Herdman attended Kentucky Christian College where he majored in Math and Science. KCC is also the place where Herdman met the members of the band Audio Adrenaline, then called A-180. Herdman was not a musician but in 1989 convinced friends Mark Stuart and Barry Blair to record two songs Herdman had written the lyrics for. After the songs were completed, the song "My God" was heard by Forefront President Ron Griffin who decided to sign the band. Herdman suggested they change their name becoming Audio Adrenaline. Herdman was heavily involved in computer technology at the time and worked as a business analyst up until the time the band required his full attention in Nashville.

Audio Adrenaline became one of the most well known bands in Christian music. They sold over 3 million records and won three Grammys and multiple Dove awards. Their song "Big House" was one of the most popular songs on the 1990s. Herdman left the road to work at Flicker Records but retained his writing duties with the band until they retired in 2007.

In 2004 Herdman was one of the founding board members of the non-profit Hands and Feet Project with fellow Audio Adrenaline members Stuart and McGinniss. They run orphanages in Haiti and South America. They spend much of their time raising money and taking groups into the country of Haiti to work and visit.
