= Mark Stuart (musician) =

American former musician, philanthropist, and missionary (born 1968)

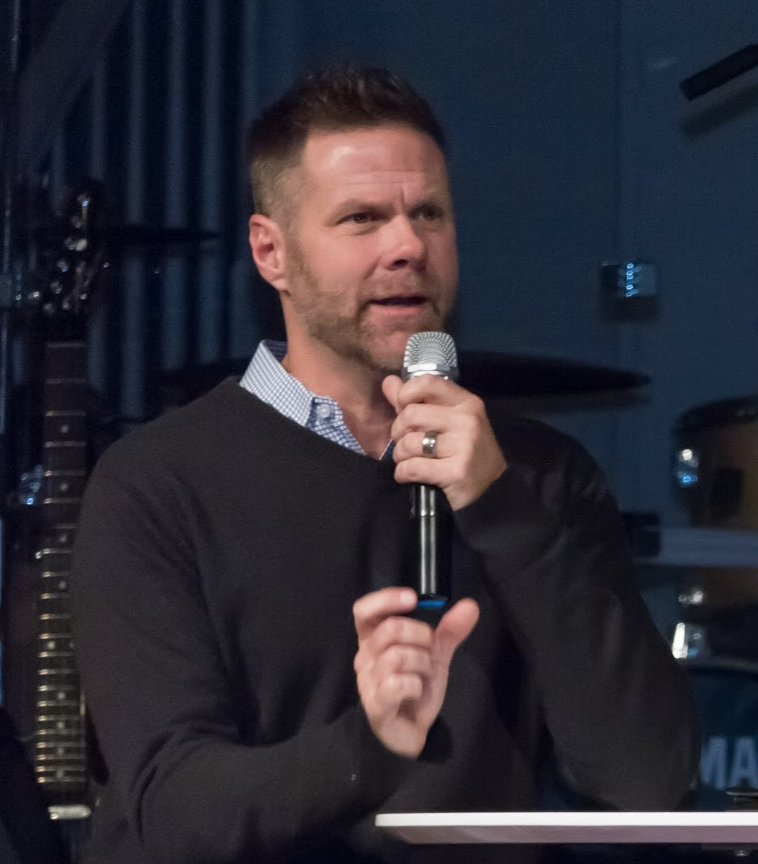
- Stuart in 2016

Background information
- Born: Mark Alan Stuart; April 14, 1968 (age 58)
- Genres: Christian rock, rock
- Instruments: Vocals; guitar
- Years active: 1986–2007

Mark Alan Stuart (born April 14, 1968) is an American missionary and former Christian rock musician. He was the lead vocalist for the Christian rock band Audio Adrenaline from 1986 to 2007. Stuart has won two Grammy Awards and has been nominated for four others.

== Audio Adrenaline ==
Mark Stuart was the lead singer of Audio Adrenaline from 1986 to 2007. Audio Adrenaline was formed in 1986 at Kentucky Christian College (later known as Kentucky Christian University) by Stuart, guitarist Barry Blair, drummer Brian Hayes, keyboardist Bob Herdman, and bassist Will McGinnis. The band was originally known as A-180. Stuart retired from the band in 2007 due to "ongoing vocal challenges" stemming from a disorder known as spasmodic dysphonia, and Audio Adrenaline disbanded at that time.

Stuart has won two Grammy Awards and has been nominated for four others.

== Other endeavors ==
Stuart and Will McGinniss of Audio Adrenaline started a project called Know Hope Collective. The project features musicians that sing worship songs and present testimonies.

=== Missionary work ===
Stuart has visited Haiti consistently to help with missionary efforts. Stuart and McGinniss started the Hands and Feet Project, a nonprofit charity that funds orphanages in Haiti, in 2003.

On January 12, 2010, Stuart, his parents, and his wife Aegis were working at the Hands and Feet Project in Jacmel, Haiti when the earthquake struck Port-au-Prince. None at the Project were injured by the quake, and Stuart was interviewed by media outlets such as CNN, MSNBC and BBC, among others. He assisted with relief efforts in Jacmel until returning to the U.S. on January 22, when he continued to assist by raising funds through continued coordination of relief efforts and organization of benefit concerts.

== Personal life ==
Stuart married Kerri McKeehan, sister of TobyMac, in 1995. The two later divorced. He and his second wife, Aegis, have two adopted children originally from Haiti.
