= Jaci Velasquez discography =

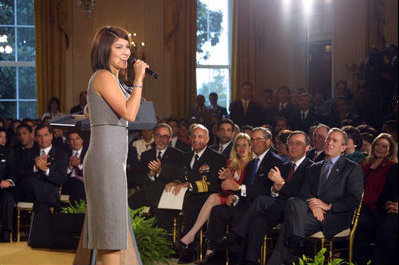
- Velasquez performing at the White House in 2002
- Studio albums: 17
- EPs: 2
- Compilation albums: 3
- Music videos: 13

This is the discography of American contemporary Christian and Latin pop singer Jaci Velasquez. She has released 17 studio albums, 3 compilation albums, and numerous singles since 1988.

== Albums ==
=== Studio albums ===
List of studio albums, with selected chart positions, certifications and album details
Title	Album details	Peak chart positions				Certifications
Title	Album details	US	US Christ.	US Latin	US Latin Pop	Certifications
My Favorite Songs	Release date: 1988; Label: Independent; Format: Cassette	45	9	—	—	
Help Me	Release date: 1992; Label: Altavista; Format: CD, Cassette	67	12	—	—	
Keep the Fire Burning	Release date: 1994; Label: Briante Music; Format: CD, Cassette	58	6	—	—	
Heavenly Place	Release date: May 13, 1996; Label: Myrrh Records; Format: CD, digital download	142	2	—	—	RIAA: Platinum
Jaci Velasquez	Release date: June 2, 1998; Label: Myrrh; Format: CD, Cassette, digital download	56	1	—	—	RIAA: Gold
Llegar a Ti	Release date: August 31, 1999; Label: Sony Discos; Format: CD, Cassette, digital download	—	7	4	2	RIAA: 2× Platinum (Latin)
Crystal Clear	Release date: September 5, 2000; Label: Word Records; Format: CD, Cassette, digital download	42	3	—	—	RIAA: Gold
Mi Corazón	Release date: May 8, 2001; Label: Sony Discos; Format: CD, Cassette, digital download	—	24	7	5	RIAA: Platinum (Latin)
Christmas	Release date: September 18, 2001; Label: Word Records; Format: CD, Cassette, digital download	102	6	—	—	
Navidad	Release date: November 6, 2001; Label: Sony Discos; Format: CD, Cassette, digital download	—	—	23	8	
Unspoken	Release date: March 25, 2003; Label: Word Records; Format: CD, Cassette, digital download	55	2	—	—	
Milagro	Release date: April 1, 2003; Label: Sony Discos; Format: CD, Cassette, digital download	—	—	24	9	
Beauty Has Grace	Release date: May 3, 2005; Label: Word Records; Format: CD, digital download	195	13	—	—	
Love Out Loud	Release date: March 18, 2008; Label: A'postrophe; Format: CD, digital download	—	21	—	—	
Diamond	Release date: February 7, 2012; Label: Inpop; Format: CD, digital download	— (Note: Diamond did not enter the Billboard 200, but did peak at No. 198 on the Top Current Albums chart.)	18	—	—	
Buenas Noches Mi Sol	Release date: September 4, 2012; Label: Fisher-Price; Format: CD, digital download	—	—	—	—	
Trust/Confío	Release date: March 31, 2017; Label: Integrity Music; Format: CD, digital download, streaming	—	— (Note: Trust did not enter the Top Christian Albums, but did peak at No. 33 on the Christian Album Sales chart.)	25	7	
"—" denotes releases that did not chart or was not released in that territory.

=== Compilation albums ===
List of compilation albums, with selected chart positions and album details
Title	Album details	Peak chart positions
Title	Album details	US Christ.
Mi Historia Musical	Release date: October 9, 2004; Label: Sony Discos; Format: CD, digital download	—
On My Knees: The Best of Jaci Velasquez	Release date: May 9, 2006; Label: Word Records; Format: CD, digital download; Also released as Jaci Velasquez: Greatest Hits	22
Top Ten	Release date: August 24, 2010; Label: Word Records; Format: CD, digital download	—
"—" denotes releases that did not chart or was not released in that territory.

== Extended plays ==
List of extended plays, with album details
Title	Album details
Open House	Release date: October 30, 2007; Label: A'postrophe; Format: CD, digital download
Acoustic Favorites	Release date: July 17, 2012; Label: Inpop; Format: CD, digital download

== Singles ==
=== As lead artist ===
List of singles as lead artist, with selected chart positions, showing year released and album name
Year	Title	Peak positions				Album
Year	Title	US Bub.	US Christ.	US Latin	US Latin Pop	Album
1996	"If This World"	—	--	—	—	Heavenly Place
1996	"Flower in the Rain"	—	--	—	—	Heavenly Place
1996	"Un Lugar Celestial (Heavenly Place)"	—	--	—	—	Heavenly Place
1997	"On My Knees"	—	-- (Note: On My Knees did not enter the Hot Christian Songs, but did peak at No. 50 on the Christian Digital Song Sales chart.)	—	—	Heavenly Place
1997	"We Can Make a Difference"	—	--	—	—	Heavenly Place
1998	"God So Loved"	—	--	—	—	Jaci Velasquez
1998	"Glory"	—	--	—	—	Jaci Velasquez
1999	"Speak for Me"	—	--	—	—	Jaci Velasquez
1999	"Show You Love"	—	--	—	—	Jaci Velasquez
1999	"You"	—	--	—	—	Jaci Velasquez
1999	"God Loves You"	—	--	—	—	Touched by an Angel: The Album
1999	"I Will Rest in You"	—	--	—	—	Streams
1999	"Llegar a Ti" (featuring MDO)	—	--	1	1	Llegar a Ti
2000	"Solo Tú"	—	--	4	2	Llegar a Ti
2000	"De Creer en Ti" ("On My Knees")	—	--	18	10	Llegar a Ti
2000	"Un Lugar Celestial"	—	--	40	19	Llegar a Ti
2000	"Love Will Find You" ("Llegar a Ti")	— (Note: Love Will Find You did not enter the Bubbling Under Hot 100, but did peak at No. 24 on the Dance Club Songs.)	--	—	—	Music of the Heart soundtrack
2000	"Imagine Me Without You"	—	--	—	—	Crystal Clear
2001	"Everytime I Fall"	—	--	—	—	Crystal Clear
2001	"Just a Prayer Away"	—	--	—	—	Crystal Clear
2001	"Adore"	—	--	—	—	Crystal Clear
2001	"You're Not There"	—	--	—	—	Crystal Clear
2001	"¿Cómo Se Cura una Herida?"	16	--	1	1	Mi Córazon
2001	"Vida Mía" (featuring Son by Four)	—	--	—	—	Mi Córazon
2001	"The Chipmunk Song (Christmas Don't Be Late)" (duet with Alvin and the Chipmunks)	—	--	—	—	Christmas
2001	"Feliz Navidad"	—	--	—	—	Christmas
2001	"The First Noel"	—	--	—	—	Christmas
2001	"It Came Upon a Midnight Clear"	—	--	—	—	non-album
2001	"Tiempo de Amar"	—	--	—	—	Navidad
2001	"In Green Pastures"	—	--	—	—	A Traveling Light
2002	"Center of Your Love"	—	--	—	—	Crystal Clear
2002	"Crystal Clear"	—	--	—	—	Crystal Clear
2002	"Déjame Quererte para Siempre"	—	--	—	34	Mi Corazón
2002	"No Me Rendiré" (duet with Pablo Portillo)	—	--	19	12	Protagonistas de la Música
2003	"You're My God"	—	— (Note: You're My God did not enter the Hot Christian Songs, but did peak at No. 2 on the R&R Christian AC Top 30 chart.)	—	—	Unspoken
2003	"Jesus Is"	—	22	—	—	Unspoken
2003	"Where I Belong"	—	— (Note: Where I Belong did not enter the Hot Christian Songs, but did peak at No. 12 on the R&R Inspo National Airplay chart.)	—	—	Unspoken
2003	"Unspoken"	—	8	—	—	Unspoken
2003	"No Hace Falta un Hombre"	—	—	5	5	Milagro
2003	"I Don't Need a Man"	—	—	—	—	Chasing Papi soundtrack
2005	"With All My Soul"	—	—	—	—	Beauty Has Grace
2005	"Lay It Down"	—	— (Note: Lay It Down did not enter the Hot Christian Songs, but did peak at No. 27 on the R&R Christian AC Top 30 Indicator.)	—	—	Beauty Has Grace
2007	"Auld Lang Syne"	—	—	—	—	Open House
2007	"Loved by You"	—	—	—	—	Songs of Hope
2008	"Love Out Loud"	—	—	—	—	Love Out Loud
2008	"Jesus (The Way)"	—	—	—	—	Love Out Loud
2011	"Jingle Bells" (duet with Nic Gonzales)	—	31	—	—	This Joyful Christmas
2012	"Give Them Jesus"	—	33	—	—	Diamond
2017	"Let the Lion Roar" (with Tim Rushlow)	—	—	—	—	non-album
2018	"God Who Moves the Mountains"	—	—	—	—	Trust/Confío
2018	"Clamaré"	—	—	—	—	Trust/Confío
2018	"Great Are You Lord" (featuring Nic Gonzales)	—	—	—	—	Trust/Confío
2020	"Cover Me"/"Cúbreme"	—	—	—	—	non-album
"—" denotes releases that did not chart or was not released in that territory. "--" denotes chart did not exist at that time.

=== As featured artist ===
List of singles as featured artist, showing year released and album name
Year	Title	Album
2001	"El Último Adiós (The Last Goodbye)" (Various artists)	non-album
2013	"Reinas" (Eddie Martinez featuring Jaci Velasquez)	Te Seguiré
2013	"Unforgettable" (David Velásquez featuring Jaci Velasquez)	non-album
2019	"Can't Hold a Candel" (Brennin Hunt featuring Jaci Velasquez)	non-album
2019	"Always Grace" (Matt Redman featuring Jaci Velasquez)	non-album
2025	"¡DALE! Praise" (Evan Egerer featuring Jaci Velasquez)	non-album

== Videography ==
=== Music videos ===
Year	Title	Album
1996	"Un Lugar Celestial"	Heavenly Place
1997	"On My Knees"	Heavenly Place
1998	"God So Loved"	Jaci Velásquez
1999	"Llegar a Ti" (with MDO)	Jaci Velásquez
1999	"Love Will Find You" (with MDO)	Music of the Heart soundtrack
2001	"Adore"	Crystal Clear
2001	"¿Cómo Se Cura una Herida?" (2 versions)	Mi Corazón
2003	"No Hace Falta un Hombre"	Milagro
2018	"Clamaré"	Trust/Confío

=== Collaborations in music videos ===
Year	Title	Other Performer	Album
2001	"El Último Adiós (The Last Goodbye)"	Various artists	non-album
2013	"Reinas"	Eddie Martinez	Te Seguiré
2025	"¡DALE! Praise"	Evan Egerer	non-album
