= Cómo Se Cura una Herida =

Single by Jaci Velasquez

from the album Mi Corazón
- Released: March 27, 2001
- Length: 4:29
- Label: Sony Discos
- Songwriters: Jorge Luís Piloto; Rudy Pérez
- Producer: Rudy Pérez

Jaci Velasquez singles chronology
"Adore" (2000)	"Cómo Se Cura una Herida" (2001)	"Dejame Quererte Para Siempre" (2001)

"Cómo Se Cura una Herida" (transl. "How to Mend a Pain") is a song by American singer Jaci Velasquez for her fifth studio album, Mi Corazón (2001). The song was written by Jorge Luis Piolto and Rudy Pérez, with the latter handling its production. On March 27, 2001, the song was released as the album's lead single by Sony Discos. It is a ballad, in which the narrator is devastated after being betrayed by her lover. The song was inspired by the divorce of Velasquez's parents. A ranchera version of the song was also recorded.

"Cómo Se Cura una Herida" was nominated for Pop Song of the Year at 2002 Lo Nuestro Awards and Hot Latin Track of the Year and Latin Pop Airplay of the Year at the Latin Billboard Music Awards in the same year. Commercially, it topped the Billboard Hot Latin Songs and Latin Pop Airplay charts in the United States, becoming Velasquez's second number one on both charts. An accompanying music video was directed by Pablo Croce and features Velasquez walking in a forest and a city.

== Background and composition ==
In 1999, Jaci Velasquez released her first Spanish-language album, Llegar a Ti, which earned a Grammy nomination for Best Latin Pop Performance in 2000. The record was then followed up with Crystal Clear a year later, which was nominated for the Grammy Award for Best Pop/Contemporary Gospel Album the following year. Both albums were produced by Mark Heimermann and Rudy Pérez. On March 16, 2001, Sony Discos announced that Velasquez was working on a new album and once again collaborated with Heimemann and Pérez along with working with Emilio Estefan, Alejandro Jaen, and Desmond Child.

Pérez produced the album's opening track, "Cómo Se Cura una Herida", which he co-wrote with Jorge Luis Piloto. According to Sony Discos's website, "Cómo Se Cura una Herida" is a "heartfelt" ballad that "embodies the devastating feeling of when your world coming crumbling down" after discovering a lover's betrayal. The song concludes that "there is only one true being". According to Velasquez, the song was inspired by her parents' divorce. A ranchera version of the track was also recorded for the album.

== Promotion and reception ==
"Cómo Se Cura una Herida" was released as the album's lead single on March 27, 2001, by Sony Discos. Its music video was directed by Pablo Croce and features Velasquez walking in a forest and a city. AllMusic editor Drago Bonacich regarded "Cómo Se Cura una Herida" as a "romantic ballad". Richard Harrington of The Washington Post called it the album's highlight, although he felt the ranchera version "falls flat".

At the 2002 Latin Billboard Music Awards, "Cómo Se Cura una Herida" was nominated in the categories of Hot Latin Track of the Year and Latin Pop Airplay of the Year, but ultimately lost both awards to "Abrázame Muy Fuerte" by Juan Gabriel. In the same year, it was nominated for Pop Song of the Year at Lo Nuestro Awards, but also lost to "Abrázame Muy Fuerte". It was recognized as one of the best-performing songs of the year at the ASCAP Latin Awards under the pop/ballad category in 2002. Commercially, "Cómo Se Cura una Herida" topped the Billboard Hot Latin Songs and Latin Pop Airplay charts in the US, making it Velasquez's second number one on both charts. "Cómo Se Cura una Herida" was the sixth best-performing song of 2001 on the former chart.

== Formats and track listings ==
Promotional single

1. Cómo Se Cura Una Herida – 4:29
2. Cómo Se Cura Una Herida (ranchera version) – 4:30

== Charts ==
=== Weekly charts ===
Weekly chart positions for "Cómo Se Cura una Herida"
Chart (2001)	Peak position
US Hot Latin Songs (Billboard)	1
US Latin Pop Airplay (Billboard)	1
US Tropical Airplay (Billboard)	5

=== Year-end charts ===
2001 year-end chart performance for "Cómo Se Cura una Herida"
Chart (2001)	Position
US Hot Latin Songs (Billboard)	6
US Latin Pop Airplay (Billboard)	7
US Tropical Airplay (Billboard)	25

2002 year-end chart performance for "Cómo Se Cura una Herida"
Chart (2002)	Position
US Latin Pop Airplay (Billboard)	21

=== Decade-end charts ===
2000s decade-end chart performance for "Cómo Se Cura una Herida"
Chart (2000–2009)	Position
US Hot Latin Songs (Billboard)	57
US Latin Pop Airplay (Billboard)	21

== See also ==
- List of number-one Billboard Hot Latin Tracks of 2001
- List of Billboard Latin Pop Airplay number ones of 2001
