= Llegar a Ti (song) =

Single by Jaci Velasquez

from the album Llegar a Ti
- Released: 1999
- Genre: Pop
- Length: 4:34
- Label: Sony Discos
- Songwriter: Abel Talamántez • Didier Hernández • Tomás Torres
- Producer: Rudy Pérez • Mark Heimermann • Phil Nash

Jaci Velasquez singles chronology
"I Will Rest in You" (1999)	"Llegar a Ti" (1999)	"Sólo Tú" (1999)

Music video
- "Llegar a Ti" on YouTube

"Llegar a Ti" (transl. "Reaching You") is a song by American singer Jaci Velasquez for her third studio album of the same name (1999). The song was written by Abel Talamántez, Didier Hernández, and Tomás Torres with Rudy Pérez, Mark Heimermann, and Phil Nash handling its productions. A pop ballad, the song, as with the other tracks from the album, explores themes of faith. One music journalist noted that the song could be interpreted into love of a person or God. An English-language version titled "Love Will Find You" was also recorded with additional lyrics by Phil Galdston and D. Peter Hernandez.

"Llegar a Ti" was met with positive reactions from music critics, who found the track to be beautiful. The song led to Velasquez receiving several accolades, including a Latin Grammy nomination for Best Female Pop Vocal Performance in 2000. Commercially, it topped the Billboard Hot Latin Songs and Latin Pop Airplay charts in the United States, making her the first Christian artist to do so. "Love Will Find You" peaked at number 24 on the Billboard Dance Club Songs chart. An accompanying music video features Velasquez performing in a well-lit blue room.

== Background and composition ==
Since signing on to Myrrh Records in 1995, Velasquez had achieved two gold certifications with her Christian-themed albums Heavenly Place (1996) and her 1998 self-titled record and won the Dove Award for New Artist of the Year in 1997. Following the latter album's release, she expressed an interest in recording a Spanish-language record. According to Velasquez: "It has been a dream of mine to do a record in the language that defines who I am and where I come from, I wanted to do songs that reflect who I am. I love Spanish. I think it's a more passionate language than English. In English there's only one word for something, but in Spanish there are 20 words you can choose from to say one thing." To prepare for the Spanish-language record, she signed a five-disc deal with Sony Discos, with her label debut album being produced by Rudy Pérez. Mark Heimermann and Phil Nash also handled its productions, the former having produced Velasquez's previous albums.

The album, Llegar a Ti, was eventually released on August 31, 1999, and consists of six Spanish-language versions of her earlier songs as well as five original compositions including the title track. "Llegar a Ti" was composed by Tommy Torres and MDO members Didier Hernández and Abel Talamántez. The band also performs the background vocals in the track. A pop ballad, the song (along with the other tracks from the album) "explore themes of faith". Enrique Fernandez of the Sun-Sentinel noted that the track "can be read two ways: love of a human or of a higher entity". An English-language version of the song, "Love Will Find You", was recorded for the soundtrack of Music of the Heart (1999) with additional writing by Phil Galdston and D. Peter Hernandez.

== Promotion and reception ==
"Llegar a Ti" was released as the album's lead single in 1999 by Sony Discos. Its music video features Velasquez singing in a well-lit blue room with MDO appearing on a TV screen as background vocalists. Billboard's John Lannert called "Llegar a Ti" a "beautiful" single, while The Dallas Morning News critic Berta Delgado found it to be a "gorgeous ballad". The song has also been described as "tender" by The Philadelphia Inquirer editor Kevin L. Carter and "uplifting" by J.D. Considine of The Baltimore Sun. The Sun-Sentinel's Fernandez praised the track as a "generous slice of the tender yet passionate pop" song. At the inaugural Latin Grammy Awards in 2000, "Llegar a Ti" was also nominated in the category of the Best Female Pop Vocal Performance, which went to "Ojos Así" by Shakira. "Llegar a Ti" was nominated Pop Song of the Year at the 13th Annual Lo Nuestro Awards but ultimately lost to "A Puro Dolor" by Son by Four. It was recognized as one of the best-performing songs of the year at the ASCAP Latin Awards under the pop/ballad category in 2000. Commercially, "Llegar a Ti" topped the Billboard Hot Latin Songs and Latin Pop Airplay charts in the US, making her the first Christian artist to reach number one on the Latin charts. The English-language version peaked at number 24 on the Billboard Dance Club Songs chart.

== Formats and track listings ==
Promotional single

1. Llegar a Ti – 4:28

Mexican promotional single

1. Llegar a Ti (album version) – 4:34
2. Llegar a Ti (Spanish radio) – 4:34
3. Love Will Find You (English) – 4:15
4. Love Will Find You (Higher Love Mix Radio) – 4:38

== Charts ==
=== Weekly charts ===
Weekly chart positions for "Llegar a Ti"
Chart (1999)	Peak position
US Hot Latin Songs (Billboard)	1
US Latin Pop Airplay (Billboard)	1

Weekly chart positions for "Love Will Find You"
Chart (2000)	Peak position
US Dance Club Songs (Billboard)	24

=== Year-end charts ===
1999 year-end chart performance for "Llegar a Ti"
Chart (1999)	Position
US Hot Latin Songs (Billboard)	25

== See also ==
- List of number-one Billboard Hot Latin Tracks of 1999
- List of Billboard Latin Pop Airplay number ones of 1999
