= On My Knees (Jaci Velasquez song) =

- "De Creer En Ti" Spanish version of "On My Knees"

Single by Jaci Velasquez

from the album Heavenly Place
- Released: March 3, 1997
- Recorded: 1995–1996
- Genre: Christian pop; Latin pop; worship
- Length: 3:51
- Label: Myrrh
- Songwriters: David A Mullen; Michael Ochs; Nicole Coleman-Mullen
- Producers: David Hamilton; Mark Heimermann

Jaci Velasquez singles chronology
"Un Lugar Celestial (a Heavenly Place)" (1996)	"On My Knees" (1997)	"We Can Make a Difference" (1997)

"On My Knees" is a 1997 song performed by Jaci Velasquez. It is considered Velasquez's signature song and was released as the third single from her debut album Heavenly Place. A Spanish version was released on the album Llegar A Ti in 1999.

== Composition ==
"On My Knees" is originally in the key of A Major, with a tempo of 93 beats per minute. Written in common time, Velasquez's vocal range spans from G#_{3} to E_{5} during the song.

== Commercial performance ==
The song was a Christian radio success, peaking at No. 1 on both the R&R Christian AC and Christian Inspo National Airplay charts, upon its release. On October 6, 2012 "On My Knees" peaked at No. 50 on the Billboard Christian Digital Songs.

== Music video ==
The music video for the song premiered on YouTube on October 26, 2009. It shows Velasquez walking around while singing. However, since 2019 it has been removed from YouTube. During its time on the platform, the video gathered over two million views.

== Live performances ==
Velasquez performed the song on the GMA Dove Awards. She also performed the song on the 2015 release, CCM United: We Will Stand.

== Cover versions ==
Nicole C. Mullen covered the song on her eponymous album in 2000. Ally Brooke covered the song in 2012 as her audition on the X Factor USA. She received universal acclaim from the judges for her performance.

== Accolades ==
Awards
Year	Organization	Award	Result	Ref.
1998	GMA Dove Awards	Song of the Year	Won	

== Charts ==
Weekly chart performance for "De Creer En Tí" (Trust in You) (Spanish version of: "On My Knees")
Chart (2000)	Peak position
US Hot Latin Songs (Billboard)	18
US Latin Pop Airplay (Billboard)	10
US Tropical Airplay (Billboard)	16

Weekly chart performance for "On My Knees"
Chart (2012)	Peak position
US Christian Digital Song Sales (Billboard)	50
