= Sharecropper's Seed =

Sharecropper's Seed, Vol. 1

Studio album by Nicole C. Mullen
- Released: April 3, 2007
- Recorded: 2006–2007
- Genre: CCM; worship
- Label: Word; Warner; Curb Records
- Producer: Nicole C. Mullen; David Mullen

Nicole C. Mullen chronology
Redeemer: The Best of Nicole C. Mullen (2006)	Sharecropper's Seed, Vol. 1 (2007)	A Dream To Believe In, Vol. 2 (2008)

Sharecropper's Seed, Volume 1 is the sixth studio album from Christian artist Nicole C. Mullen. The album was released through Word, Warner, and Curb on April 3, 2007.

== Singles ==
"Convinced" was released as the lead single from the album, and peaked at No. 27. "One Touch (Press)" was released as the second single from the album. It was featured on the compilation, WOW Gospel 2008. The music video was released on November 10, 2009.

== Track listing ==
Sharecropper's Seed, Vol. 1
No.	Title	Writer(s)	Length
1.	"Sharecropper's Seed"	Nicole C. Mullen	4:01
2.	"So In Love"	Nicole C. Mullen	4:13
3.	"One Touch (Press)"	Nicole C. Mullen	4:25
4.	"Convinced"	Nicole C. Mullen, David Hentschel, Nick Moroch	4:40
5.	"When I Grow Up"	Nicole C. Mullen	3:13
6.	"Under the Shadows"	Nicole C. Mullen, Bashiri Johnson	4:07
7.	"Eliohim"	Nicole C. Mullen	3:50
8.	"I Wish"	Nicole C. Mullen	3:07
9.	"Fall"	Nicole C. Mullen	3:11
10.	"Baby Love"	Nicole C. Mullen, Tom McAnany	3:36
Total length:			41:02

== Personnel ==
- Nicole C. Mullen – vocals, finger snaps (7), dobro (9)
- David Hentschel – keyboards (3, 4, 9), drums (3, 4, 9), arrangements (3–5, 9), acoustic piano (5), bass (7)
- George Duke – Rhodes electric piano (8)
- Nick Moroch – guitars (1, 3–5, 9), arrangements (1, 4, 5, 9), electric guitars (7)
- John Patitucci – bass (1–3), arco bass solo (1, 3)
- Tony Levin – bass (3–5, 9)
- Roy Hendrickson – drums (7), beats (7)
- Dan Weiner – garbage can (2)
- Bashiri Johnson – percussion (6), African vocals (6)
- Christine Kim – cello (1, 3–5, 8–10)
- Miranda Seilaff – viola (1, 3–5, 8, 9)
- Don Scheindlin – viola (10)
- Pauline Kim – violin (1, 3–5, 8, 9)
- Conrad Harris – violin (4, 10)
- Hoiroka Taguchi – violin (8)
- Robin Zeh – violin (10)
- David Mann – string arrangements (1, 9)
- Tom McAnany – arrangements (2)
- Jeremy Lubbock – arrangements (8, 10)
- Curtis King – guest vocals (4)
- Jasmine Mullen, Josiah Mullen, Max Mullen and Ryan Mullen – special guest vocals (5)

=== Production ===
- Otto Price – A&R
- Nicole C. Mullen – producer
- David Mullen – producer
- Roy Hendrickson – recording, editing (1), mixing (3, 4, 6, 7, 9)
- Erik Zobler – mixing (1, 2, 5, 8, 10), editing (2), recording (5, 8, 10)
- Carlos "Storm" Martinez – recording (6)
- Justin Gerrish – assistant engineer
- Bryan Pugh – assistant engineer
- David Tolomei – assistant engineer
- Tom McAnany – editing (1–5, 8–10), cover concept
- Thai Long Ly – editing (1–3, 5, 8, 10)
- Paul Kevorkian – mastering at Kevorkian Mastering (New York, NY)
- Katherine Petillo – creative director
- Ray Roper – design
- Michael Gomez – photography
- Ollie Powers – make-up
- Valerie Bridgeforth – hair stylist

== Charts ==
Chart (2013)	Peak position
US Top Christian Albums (Billboard)	15
US Top Gospel Albums (Billboard)	3
