= Open House (EP) =

EP by Jaci Velasquez
- Released: October 30, 2007
- Recorded: 2007
- Length: 39:27
- Label: A'postrophe

Jaci Velasquez chronology
On My Knees: The Best of Jaci Velasquez (2006)	Open House (2007)	Love Out Loud (2008)

Open House is the debut EP by Christian artist Jaci Velasquez. It was released on October 30, 2007. It contains an original Christmas song, two traditional songs and an exclusive interview with Velasquez.

== Track listing ==
1. "It Came Upon a Midnight Clear" (3:33)
2. "Quiet Christmas Night (Gloria)" (4:53)
3. "Auld Lang Syne" (3:30)
4. "The Open House Interview" (29:21)
