= Talk About It (album) =

Studio album by Nicole C. Mullen
- Released: August 28, 2001
- Genre: CCM, Inspirational, R&B
- Length: 51:44
- Label: Word
- Producer: David Mullen, Nicole C. Mullen, Justin Niebank

Nicole C. Mullen chronology
Nicole C. Mullen (2000)	Talk About It (2001)	Christmas in Black & White (2002)

Professional ratings
Review scores
Source	Rating
Cross Rhythms	7/10 stars

Talk About It is the fourth album by Christian singer-songwriter Nicole C. Mullen. The album includes the single and music video "Call On Jesus." Mullen won a 2001 Dove Award for Songwriter of the Year.

== Track listing ==
All tracks are written by Nicole Coleman-Mullen, unless otherwise noted.

No.	Title	Writer(s)	Length
1.	"All Aboard"		1:20
2.	"Talk About It (Say So)"	Nicole Coleman-Mullen; Brooke Dozier	3:05
3.	"Baby Girl"		3:32
4.	"Call on Jesus"		4:56
5.	"#27"		0:23
6.	"Let Me Go"	Nicole Coleman-Mullen; David Cox	5:15
7.	"Witness"	Nicole Coleman-Mullen; David Cox; Linda Kowatch	3:35
8.	"Come Unto Me"		4:45
9.	"I Can/Believe"	Nicole Coleman-Mullen; Napoleon Coleman, Jr.	3:22
10.	"The Ring"		3:21
11.	"Sometimes"	Nicole Coleman-Mullen; David Mullen	3:05
12.	"Jas Class"		0:29
13.	"Black Light"	Nicole Coleman-Mullen; David Mullen	5:32
14.	"Heaven"		9:04
Total length:			51:44

== Chart history ==
Chart (2001)	Peak position
U.S. Billboard 200	123
