= Everyday People (album) =

Studio album by Nicole C. Mullen

Studio album by Nicole C. Mullen
- Released: September 14, 2004
- Length: 59:36
- Label: Curb
- Producer: Nicole C. Mullen; David Mullen; Tommy Sims; James "Big Jim" Wright; Andrew Ramsey; Shannon Sanders

Professional ratings
Review scores
| Source | Rating |
|---|---|
| Cross Rhythms | 7/10 squares |
| Jesus Freak Hideout | 3.5/5 stars |

Everyday People is a 2004 studio album by contemporary Christian music artist Nicole C. Mullen. Produced by Mullen, her husband David Mullen, Tommy Sims, James "Big Jim" Wright, Andrew Ramsey and Shannon Sanders, it was released on September 14, 2004 on Curb Records. It peaked at No. 41 on the Billboard Heatseakers chart on October 9, 2004 and No. 6 on their Top Gospel Albums chart on October 2, 2004.

== Track listing ==
| No. | Title | Writer(s) | Length |
|---|---|---|---|
| 1. | "Everyday People" | Sylvester Stewart | 3:26 |
| 2. | "I Am" | Nicole C. Mullen, David Mullen | 4:32 |
| 3. | "Message for You" | C. Mullen, Bootsy Collins, Brooke Dozier | 4:20 |
| 4. | "This, This" | C. Mullen, Raeshawn Boyd, Robin Sanders | 2:45 |
| 5. | "Music of My Heart" | C. Mullen | 5:25 |
| 6. | "Bye Bye Briana" | C. Mullen | 5:34 |
| 7. | "Dancin' in the Rain" | C. Mullen, Shannon Sanders, Andrew Ramsey | 3:53 |
| 8. | "The One" | C. Mullen | 3:13 |
| 9. | "Gon' Be Free" | C. Mullen, Lynette Villa de Rey | 4:32 |
| 10. | "Without You" | C. Mullen, James Wright | 4:42 |
| 11. | "Deity" | C. Mullen | 3:22 |
| 12. | "It's About Us" | C. Mullen, Mullen | 3:40 |
| 13. | "Valorie" | C. Mullen, Mullen | 6:06 |
| 14. | "Every Nation" | C. Mullen | 3:40 |

== Personnel ==
Adapted from AllMusic

- Nicole C. Mullen – vocals, background vocals, programming
- David Mullen – horn arrangements, string arrangements, background vocals
- Daniel O'Lannerghty – upright bass, string arrangements, strings
- Bootsy Collins – bass, engineer, guitar, keyboards, programming, background vocals
- Jimmy Wright – keyboards
- Ivy Bostic – group member, background vocals
- Kenneth Cooke – group member, guitar, background vocals
- Tommy Sims – bass, claves, Clavinet, guitar, background vocals
- James "Big Jim" Wright – keyboards
- Andrew Ramsey – bass, bass vocals, guitar, programming
- Bernie Harris – bass
- Shannon Sanders – Fender Rhodes, Hammond organ, programming, toy piano
- DeMarco Johnson – keyboards
- Morris Mingo – keyboards
- Cary Barlowe – guitar
- Tom Hemby – guitar
- Akil Thompson – bass, percussion
- Iz – drum programming
- Jamie Moore – drum programming, drums
- Chris Estes – drums
- Dan Needham – drums
- Marvin Sims – drums
- Jasmine Mullen – readings
- LeAnne Palmore – background vocals
- Antonio Phelon – background vocals
- Debreca Smith – background vocals
- Jerard Woods – background vocals
- Jovaun Woods – background vocals
- Jason Eskridge – vocals, background vocals
- Max Fulwider – saxophone
- Calvin Turner – trombone
- Steve Patrick – trombone, trumpet
- David Angel – strings
- Monisa Phillips Angel – strings
- Janet Askey – strings
- David Davidson – strings
- Jim Grosjean – strings
- Robert Mason – strings
- Carole Rabinowitz-Neuen – strings
- Pamela Sixfin – strings
- Alan Umstead – strings
- Karen Winkelmann – strings

Production

- Nicole C. Mullen – producer, executive producer
- David Mullen – producer
- Tommy Sims – producer, engineer, mixing
- James "Big Jim" Wright – producer
- Shannon Sanders – producer
- Andrew Ramsey – producer, engineer
- Kenneth Cooke – engineer
- Danny Duncan – engineer
- Greg Fuqua – engineer
- Marius Perron III – engineer
- Aaron Swihart – engineer
- Drew Douthit – assistant engineer, digital editing
- Lee Bridges – assistant engineer
- Craig Bauer – digital editing, engineer
- Bryan Lenox – engineer, mixing
- Matt Marrin – engineer, mixing
- John Frye – mixing
- F. Reid Shippen – mixing
- Ken Love – mastering
- Shawn McSpadden – A&R
- Katherine Petillo – creative director
- Ray Roper – design
- Robert Ascroft – photography
- Alexia Abegg – wardrobe
- Jennifer Kemp – wardrobe
- Valerie Bridgeforth – hair stylist
