= 2002 Latin Billboard Music Awards =

2002 Billboard Latin Music Awards
- Date: May 09, 2002
- Venue: Jackie Gleason Theater, Miami Beach, Florida

The 9th annual Billboard Latin Music Awards, which honor the most popular albums, songs, and performers in Latin music, took place May 9 in Miami. Winners are determined by the actual sales and radio airplay data that informs Billboard's weekly charts, including Top Latin Albums, and radio charts, including Hot Latin Tracks, during a one-year period from the issue dated Feb. 17, 2001 through the Feb. 9, 2002, issue.

== Hot Latin songs of the year ==
=== Hot Latin track of the year ===
- "Abrázame Muy Fuerte" — Juan Gabriel
- "O Me Voy O Te Vas" — Marco Antonio Solís
- "Cómo Se Cura una Herida" — Jaci Velasquez
- "No Me Conoces Aun" — Palomo

=== Hot Latin track of the year, vocal duo ===
- "No Vale La Pena" — Nydia feat. Juan Gabriel
- "La Calandria" — Ramón Ayala feat. Jody Farias
- "Dos Corazones, Dos Historias" — Julio Iglesias feat. Alejandro Fernández
- "El Duelo" — La Ley feat. Ely Guerra

=== Hot Latin tracks artist of the year ===
- Cristian Castro
- Juan Gabriel
- Banda El Recodo
- Marco Antonio Solís

== People ==
=== Songwriter of the year ===
- Juan Gabriel
- Marco Antonio Solís
- Omar Alfanno
- Estefano

=== Producer of the year ===
- Bebu Silvetti
- Alejandro Jaén
- Pepe Aguilar
- Jesus Guillen

== Pop album of the year, male ==
- Mis Romances — Luis Miguel
- Más de Mi Alma — Marco Antonio Solís
- Azul — Cristian Castro
- Origenes — Alejandro Fernández

== Pop album of the year, female ==
- Mi Corazon — Jaci Velasquez (Sony Discos)
- Live, The Last Concert-Houston, Texas Feb. 26, 1995 — Selena (EMI Latin)
- Entre Tangos Y Mariachi — Rocío Dúrcal (BMG Latin)
- Huelo A Soledad — Ana Gabriel (Sony Discos)

== Pop album of the year, group ==
- Shhh! — A. B. Quintanilla Y Los Kumbia Kings (EMI Latin)
- Somos Gitanos — Gipsy Kings (Nonesuch)
- Siempre En Mi Mente — Los Tri-O (BMG Latin)
- Embrace the Chaos — Ozomatli (Interscope)

== Pop album of the year, new artist ==
- Proxima Estacion...Esperanza — Manu Chao (Virgin)
- Alexandre Pires — Alexandre Pires (BMG Latin)
- Pachanga — King Africa (Fonovisa)
- Si Se — Si Se (Luaka Bop/Virgin)

== Latin pop airplay track of the year ==
- "Abrázame Muy Fuerte" — Juan Gabriel (BMG Latin)
- "Cómo Se Cura una Herida" — Jaci Velasquez (Sony Discos)
- "Azul" — Cristian (BMG Latin)
- "Suerte" — Shakira (Sony Discos)

== Top Latin albums artist of the year ==
- Marc Anthony (Sony Discos)
- A.B. Quintanilla & Los Kumbia Kings (EMI Latin)
- Vicente Fernández (Sony Discos)
- Lupillo Rivera (Sony Discos)

== Latin rock album of the year ==
- Proxima Estacion...Esperanza — Manu Chao (Virgin)
- Embrace The Chaos — Ozomatli (Interscope)
- Cuando La Sangre Galopa — Jaguares (BMG Latin)
- MTV Unplugged — La Ley (Warner Latina)

== Tropical/salsa album of the year, male ==
- Libre — Marc Anthony (Sony Discos)
- Dejame Entrar — Carlos Vives (EMI Latin)
- Instinto Y Deseo — Víctor Manuelle (Sony Discos)
- Intenso — Gilberto Santa Rosa (Sony Discos)

== Tropical/salsa album of the year, female ==
- Yo Por Ti — Olga Tañón (Warner Latina)
- 8 — Gisselle (BMG Latin)
- Corazon De Mujer — Melina León (Sony Discos)
- La Negra Tiene Tumbao — Celia Cruz (Sony Discos)

== Tropical/salsa album of the year, group ==
- Coleccion Romantica — Juan Luis Guerra 440 (Karen/Universal Latino)
- Mania 2050 — Grupomania (Universal Latino)
- Calle Sabor, Esquina Amor — Limi-t 21 (EMI Latin)
- Americanizao — Fulanito (Cutting)

== Tropical/salsa album of the year, new artist ==
- Yo Si Me Enamore — Huey Dunbar (Sony Discos)
- Multiplicame — Fuerza Juvenil (Mas Music)
- Tortilla Party — El Vacilon De La Manana (J&N)
- Joseph Fonseca — Joseph Fonseca (Karen/Universal Latino)

== Tropical/salsa airplay track of the year ==
- "Me Da Lo Mismo" — Víctor Manuelle (Sony Discos)
- "Pero No Me Ama" — Gilberto Santa Rosa (Sony Discos)
- "Me Libere" — El Gran Combo (Combo)
- "Pueden Decir" — Gilberto Santa Rosa (Sony Discos)

== Regional Mexican album of the year, male ==
- Despreciado — Lupillo Rivera (Sony Discos)
- En Vivo: Desde La Plaza El Progreso De Guadalajara — Joan Sebastian (Balboa)
- Sufriendo A Solas — Lupillo Rivera (Sony Discos)
- Lo Mejor De Nosotros — Pepe Aguilar (Balboa)

== Regional Mexican album of the year, male group ==
- Ansia De Amar — Conjunto Primavera (Fonovisa)
- Contigo Por Siempre... — Banda El Recodo (Fonovisa)
- Uniendo Fronteras — Los Tigres del Norte (Fonovisa)
- En Vivo...El Hombre Y Su Musica — Ramon Ayala Y Sus Bravos Del Norte (Freddie)

== Regional Mexican album of the year, female group or female solo artist ==
- Soy Lo Prohibido — Alicia Villarreal (Universal Latino)
- Con Sabor A Mexico — Las Jilguerras (Fonovisa)
- Para Las Madrecitas — Sparx Y Lorenzo Antonio (Fonovisa)

== Regional Mexican album of the year, new artist ==
- Despreciado — Lupillo Rivera (Sony Discos)
- Sufriendo A Solas — Lupillo Rivera (Sony Discos)
- Fuerza Musical — Palomo (Disa)
- Homenaje A Chalino Sánchez — Jessie Morales:El Original De La Sierra (Univision)

== Regional Mexican airplay track of the year ==
- "Y Llegaste Tu" — Banda El Recodo (Fonovisa)
- "No Me Conoces Aun" — Palomo (Disa)
- "No Te Podias Quedar" — Conjunto Primavera (Fonovisa)
- "Despreciado" — Lupillo Rivera (Sony Discos)

== Latin greatest hits album of the year ==
- Historia De Un Idolo Vol. 1 — Vicente Fernández (Sony Discos)
- Historia Musical Romantica — Grupo Bryndis (Disa)
- La Historia — Ricky Martin (Sony Discos)
- Historia Musical — Los Angeles Azules (Disa)

== Latin compilation album of the year ==
- No. 1: Un Año De Exitos — Various Artists (Sony Discos/Warner Latina)
- Bachatahits 2001 — Various Artists (J&N/Sony Discos)
- Billboard Latin Music Awards 2001 — Various Artists (BMG Latin)
- Merenhits 2001 — Various Artists (J&N/Sony Discos)

== Latin jazz album of the year ==
- Latin Spirits — Poncho Sanchez (Concord Picante)
- Calle 54 — Soundtrack (Blue Note/Capitol)
- Volume 3-New Congo Square — Los Hombres Calientes (Basin Street)
- Supernova — Gonzalo Rubalcaba (Blue Note/Capitol)

== Latin dance club play track of the year ==
- "Heroe (Remixes)" — Enrique Iglesias (Interscope)
- "Play (Remixes)" — Jennifer Lopez (Epic)
- "Guitarra G" — Banda Sonora (Tommy Boy)
- "Out Of Nowhere" — Gloria Estefan (Epic)

== Latin dance maxi-single of the year ==
- "Love Don't Cost A Thing (Amor Se Paga Con Amor)" — Jennifer Lopez (Epic)
- "I'm Real (Remixes)" — Jennifer Lopez (Epic)
- "Loaded" — Ricky Martin (Sony Discos)
- "Out of Nowhere" — Gloria Estefan (Epic)

== Latin rap album of the year ==
- El General Is Back — El General (Mock & Roll/Lideres)
- De Nuevos A Viejos — Wisin & Yandel (BM/Aponte)
- Vivo — Vico-C (EMI Latin)
- Mundo Frio — Lito & Polaco (Pina)

== Publisher of the year ==
(Songs that charted during the tracking period.)

- WB, ASCAP
- Vander, ASCAP
- Edimonsa, ASCAP
- BMG Songs, ASCAP

== Publishing corporation of the year ==
- Warner/Chappell Music
- Sony/ATV Music
- EMI Music
- BMG Music

== Special awards ==
- Spirit of Hope – Ricky Martin
- Lifetime Achievement Award – El Gran Combo de Puerto Rico
- Star Award – Ana Gabriel
- Viewer's Choice Award – Thalía
