= Diamond (Jaci Velasquez album) =

Studio album by Jaci Velasquez
- Released: February 7, 2012
- Recorded: 2010–2011
- Genre: Adult contemporary, contemporary Christian music, pop
- Length: 41:06
- Label: Inpop
- Producer: Craig Swift, Chris Bevins

Jaci Velasquez chronology
Love Out Loud (2008)	Diamond (2012)	Buenas Noches Mi Sol (2012)

Singles from Diamond
- 1. "Give Them Jesus" Released: October 2011

Professional ratings
Review scores
Source	Rating
AllMusic	3/5 stars
Jesus Freak Hideout	3/5 stars

Diamond is the fifteenth studio album by Contemporary Christian music singer Jaci Velasquez, released in 2012 on Inpop Records. The producers of this album are Craig Swift and Chris Bevins, who are both in the band Salvador, along with Velasquez's husband, Nic Gonzalez.

== Reception ==
Diamond received mixed reviews. AllMusic notes that "the result (of the mixed genres of this album) is a somewhat jarring experience...In that respect, Diamond feels a little too self-conscious, too concerned about what the commercial prospects of the album would be rather than making a bold artistic statement". Roger Gelwicks of Jesus Freak Hideout.com says that "Diamond doesn't feel very surprising in its execution, although this is probably the most radio-friendly Velasquez has ever been...songs with innovation and vibrancy just aren't to be found here". Both Allmusic and Jesus Freak Hideout gave this album 3 out of 5 stars.

== Track listing ==
No.	Title	Writer(s)	Length
1.	"Diamond"	Tony Wood, Chad Cates and Jaci Velasquez	3:42
2.	"Give Them Jesus"	Jason Barton, Ronnie Freeman, Christopher Lockwood, Barry Weeks	3:26
3.	"The Sound of Your Voice"	Cates, Michael Farren, Weeks	3:50
4.	"Stay"	Tony Lucido, Aaron Rice, John Glover, Velasquez	3:06
5.	"Fall for You"	Glover, Anthony Lucido, Velasquez	3:31
6.	"Con El Viento A Mi Favor"	Juan Carlos Rodriguez, Velasquez	4:39
7.	"Tell Me Again"	Scott Davis, A. Lucido, Velasquez	3:37
8.	"Girl"	Glover, A. Lucido, Rice, Velasquez	3:24
9.	"Trust In You"	Craig Swift, Chris Bevins, T. Lucido, Davis, Velasquez	3:17
10.	"Guilt"	Bevins, Swift, Carl Cartee, Velasquez	3:54
11.	"Good Morning Sunshine"	Jill Paquette, William Davis, Velasquez	4:40

iTunes deluxe edition
No.	Title	Writer(s)	Length
12.	"On My Knees" (new acoustic version)	David Mullen, Nicole Coleman-Mullen, Michael Ochs	4:33
13.	"Flower in the Rain" (new acoustic version)	Chris Eaton	3:46
14.	"Imagine Me Without You" (new acoustic version)	Rudy Pérez	4:07

== Personnel ==
- Jaci Velasquez – lead vocals, backing vocals
- Chris Bevins – acoustic piano, keyboards, synth bass, percussion, string arrangements
- Craig Swift – keyboards, programming, synth bass, saxophones, horn arrangements, string arrangements, backing vocals
- Nic Gonzales – acoustic guitars, backing vocals
- Mike Payne – guitars, electric guitars
- Ron Robinson – guitars
- Josh Gonzales – bass guitar
- Tommy Lee – bass guitar
- Ben Cordonero – drums
- Garth Justice – drums
- Elliot Torres – percussion
- Justin Carpenter – trombone
- Leif Shires – trumpet
- David Angell – strings
- David Davidson – strings, string arrangements
- Jason Barton – backing vocals
- Michelle Swift – backing vocals

== Production ==
- Andrew Patton – executive producer, A&R
- Chris Bevins – producer, engineer
- Craig Swift – producer, engineer
- Sean Moffitt – mixing
- Steve Xavier – mix assistant
- Andrew Mendelson – mastering at Georgetown Masters (Nashville, Tennessee)
- Daniel McCarthy – package design, layout
- Micah Kandros – photography
- Betsy Jones – wardrobe stylist
- Jessica Mallum – hair stylist, make-up

== Charts ==
Chart performance for Diamond
Chart (2012)	Peak position
US Top Current Album Sales (Billboard)	189
US Christian Albums (Billboard)	18
