= Love Out Loud =

Love Out Loud may refer to:

- Love Out Loud (album), a 2008 album by Jaci Velasquez, or the title song
- Love Out Loud (song), a 1989 song by Earl Thomas Conley
