= Beauty Has Grace =

Studio album by Jaci Velasquez
- Released: May 3, 2005
- Recorded: 2004–2005
- Genres: Contemporary Christian music; Indie pop; alt-rock; pop/rock
- Length: 38:54
- Label: Word Entertainment LLC
- Producers: Martin Terefe; Jaci Velasquez; Dion Lopez

Jaci Velasquez chronology
Mi Historia Musical (2004)	Beauty Has Grace (2005)	On My Knees: The Best of Jaci Velasquez (2006)

Professional ratings
Review scores
Source	Rating
AllMusic	4/5 stars
Cross Rhythms UK	9/10 stars
Jesus Freak Hideout	4.5/5 stars
Christian Music Today	3.5/5 stars

Beauty Has Grace is the thirteenth studio album by Contemporary Christian music singer Jaci Velasquez. It marks a departure in style from her previous albums, having been recorded in London, England, with Martin Terefe (A-Ha, Ron Sexsmith, Leona Naess, KT Tunstall). She co-wrote six of the ten album tracks.

Velasquez decided to name the album "Kensaltown", after Kensal Town and the studio where she recorded and wrote the album, but the label was concerned that people would confuse "Kensaltown" with "Tinsel Town" so they changed it to Beauty Has Grace, a line in the song "This Love". The release date for the album was pushed back several times to May 3. The label also changed the track listing of the album which first featured the song "Hold On to This Moment", but it was replaced for "Reason to Believe"

Reviews for the album were favorable, calling Velasquez's musical change "the boldest, smartest Christian music artistic shift in recent memory". A special edition of the album was released by Family Christian Stores with a bonus track, "Love Will Find You".

== Track listing ==
1. "I'm Not Looking Down" – 3:47 (Jaci Velasquez, Michael Clarke, Martin Terefe)
2. "With All My Soul" – 3:59 (Jaci Velasquez, Marc Byrd, Steve Hindalong)
3. "Prayer to Love" – 4:08 (Jaci Velasquez, Hunter Davis, Chris Faulk)
4. "Lay It Down" – 4:01 (Chris Eaton, Don Poythress, Brian White)
5. "Something Beautiful" – 3:28 (Jeremy Rose, Yancy)
6. "Tonight" – 3:52; Feat. Michael Clarke (Marc Byrd)
7. "When You Hold Me" – 3:19 (JT Daly, Andy Smith, Brian Lee, Chad Howat, Josh Heiner)
8. "Reason to Believe" – 4:35 (Jaci Velasquez, Brad Jacoby, Martin Terefe)
9. "Supernatural" – 3:31 (Jaci Velasquez, Darren Potuck, Martin Terefe, Nick Whitecross)
10. "This Love" – 4:09 (Jaci Velasquez, Martin Terefe)
11. "Love Will Find You" – 3:35 (Alexis Grullon, Didier Hernandez, Abel Talamantez, Tommy Torres) [Bonus track]

== Singles ==
- "With All My Soul"
- "Lay It Down"

== Personnel ==
Performance credits

- Jaci Velasquez – primary artist, backing vocals
- Javier Solis – drums
- David Angell – violin
- Michael Clarke – background vocals
- David Davidson – violin
- Anthony LaMarchina – cello
- Kristin Wilkinson – viola
- Christer Jansson – percussion, drums
- Mark Lusk – acoustic guitar, electric guitar, soloist
- Claes Bjorklund – synthesizer, electric guitar
- Martin Terefe – acoustic guitar, bass guitar, percussion, piano, drums, electric guitar, background vocals, Wurlitzer, Juno
- Abel Orta – bass guitar
- Ian Fitchuk – piano, keyboards, background vocals
- Nathaniel Chan – electric guitar
- Andreas Olsson – synthesizer, piano, electric guitar, mellotron, beat box, synthesizer bass, Wurlitzer

Technical credits

- Jaci Velasquez – producer, composer, executive producer
- Martin Terefe – producer, engineer
- Dionicio R. Lopez – producer, executive producer
- Andreas Olsson– programming, engineer, drum programming
- David Davidson – string arrangements
- Richard Dodd – mastering
- Kelly Pribble – engineer
- Jacquire King – engineer
- Claes Bjorklund – programming
- Nathaniel Chan – engineer
- Andy Hunt – vocal engineer

== Charts ==
Chart performance for Beauty Has Grace
Chart (2005)	Peak position
US Billboard 200	195
US Top Christian Albums (Billboard)	13
