= Buenas Noches Mi Sol =

Studio album by Jaci Velasquez
- Released: September 4, 2012
- Genre: Children's music
- Length: 42:40
- Language: Spanish
- Label: Fisher-Price, Dream Baby (reissue)
- Producer: Ian Fitchuk

Jaci Velasquez chronology
Diamond (2012)	Buenas Noches Mi Sol (2012)	Trust/Confío (2017)

Buenas Noches Mi Sol (English: Good Night My Sunshine) is the sixteenth studio album by contemporary Christian music singer Jaci Velasquez, released on September 9, 2012, on Fisher-Price Records. The album is made up of some original recordings, covers and re-recordings of previous songs sung by Velasquez, in Spanish, in the form of lullabies made for children.

== Track listing ==
No.	Title	Writer(s)	Length
1.	"Estellita" (English title: "Twinkle, Twinkle, Little Star")	Jane Taylor	2:55
2.	"Tres avestas" (English title: "Three Little Birds")	Bob Marley	2:45
3.	"Canción De Cuna" (English title: "Lullaby")	Traditional	2:42
4.	"La Manita" (English title: "The Little Hand")	Traditional	1:33
5.	"Tu" (English title: "You")	Michelle Tumes	2:59
6.	"Arrurrú" (English title: "Arrowroot")	Tumes	2:51
7.	"La Nanita Nana" (English title: "The Nanita Nana")	Traditional	3:55
8.	"Dios Te Ama" (English title: "God Loves You")	Mark Heimermann	3:26
9.	"Sonríe" (English title: "Smile")	Charlie Chaplin	2:34
10.	"Hola Mi Sol" (English title: "Good Morning Sunshine")	Jaci Velasquez	4:09
11.	"Un Lugar Celestial" (English title: "A Heavenly Place")	Bob Farrell, Regie Hamm, Heimermann, David Velasquez	2:32
12.	"Tu Eres Mi Dicha" (English title: "You Are My Sunshine")	disputed writers	2:14
13.	"Descansaré En Ti" (English title: "I Will Rest in You")	Tumes	4:24
14.	"Duermete Mi Niño" (English title: "Fall Asleep My Child")	Traditional	3:33
