= Give Them Jesus =

Single by Jaci Velasquez

from the album Diamond
- Released: October 2011
- Recorded: 2011
- Genre: Contemporary Christian music
- Length: 3:26
- Label: Inpop
- Songwriter(s): Jason Barton; Ronnie Freeman; Christopher Lockwood; Barry Weeks

Jaci Velasquez singles chronology
"Jingle Bells" (2011)	"Give Them Jesus" (2011)	"Reinas" (2013)

"Give Them Jesus" is the lead single by singer-songwriter released in October 2011, from Jaci Velasquez's studio album, Diamond.

== Composition ==
"Give Them Jesus" is originally in the key of D Major, with a tempo of 102 beats per minute.

== Commercial performance ==
"Give Them Jesus" peaked at No. 33 on the Billboard Hot Christian Songs chart on January 14, 2012. It spent 20 weeks on the chart.

== Charts ==
Chart performance for "Give Them Jesus"
Chart (2012–13)	Peak position
US Christian Songs (Billboard)	33
US Christian Airplay (Billboard)	33
US Christian AC (Billboard)	21
