= Heavenly Place =

Studio album by Jaci Velasquez
- Released: May 13, 1996
- Recorded: 1995–1996
- Studios: Fun Attic Studio, Dark Horse Recording Studio and Studio at Mole End (Franklin, Tennessee); Great Circle Sound, House of David and Battery Studios (Nashville, Tennessee)
- Genre: Contemporary Christian music
- Length: 40:04
- Label: Myrrh
- Producers: Mark Heimermann; Phil Naish

Jaci Velasquez chronology
Keep the Fire Burning (1994)	Heavenly Place (1996)	Jaci Velasquez (1998)

Singles from Heavenly Place
- 1. "If This World" Released: April 15, 1996; 2. "Flower In The Rain" Released: July 22, 1996; 3. "Un Lugar Celestial" Released: October 21, 1996; 4. "On My Knees" Released: March 3, 1997; 5. "We Can Make A Difference" Released: June 16, 1997

Professional ratings
Review scores
Source	Rating
AllMusic	4/5 stars
Jesus Freak Hideout	4/5 stars

Heavenly Place is the fourth studio album and major label debut album by Jaci Velasquez. It released on May 13, 1996, on Myrrh Records. Prior to this album, Velasquez had released three independent albums between the ages of 9 and 14: My Favorite Songs (1988), Help Me (1992), and Keep the Fire Burning (1994).

== Critical reception ==
Rodney Batdorf wrote in his AllMusic review that "Heavenly Place is an impressive debut album from the 16-year old singer." This album includes five radio singles, including "On My Knees," which won a GMA Dove Award for Song of the Year in 1998.

== Track listing ==
No.	Title	Writer(s)	Length
1.	"If This World"	Michelle Tumes; Tyler Hayes; Eric Sundin; Mark Heimermann	4:04
2.	"Un Lugar Celestial (A Heavenly Place)"	Bob Farrell; Regie Hamm; Mark Heimermann; David Velasquez	4:07
3.	"Flower In The Rain"	Chris Eaton	3:38
4.	"On My Knees"	Nicole Coleman-Mullen; David Mullen; Michael Ochs	3:49
5.	"Shelter"	Mark Heimermann; Dann Huff; Wayne Kirkpatrick	4:19
6.	"Baptize Me"	Mark Heimermann; Erik Sundin	4:17
7.	"We Can Make a Difference"	Mark Heimermann; David Mullen	3:50
8.	"I Promise"	Jaci Velasquez; Johnny Ramirez	3:39
9.	"We Will Overcome"	Bob Farrell; Regie Hamm; Mark Heimermann	3:52
10.	"Thief of Always"	Chris Eaton	4:29
Total length:			40:04

- Track information and credits taken from the album's liner notes.

== Personnel ==
- Jaci Velasquez – lead vocals, backing vocals (1–4, 6, 10)
- Mark Heimmerman – keyboards (1–3, 5–10), drum programming (1, 2, 5–8), backing vocals (3, 4, 10), additional arrangements (4), keyboard programming (7), acoustic piano (9)
- Phil Naish – acoustic piano (4)
- George CocchinI – guitars (1, 2, 7)
- Dann Huff – guitars (2–6, 9, 10)
- Jackie Street – bass (1–7, 9, 10)
- Scott Williamson – drums (2–4, 6, 9, 10)
- Terry McMillan – percussion (1–5, 7, 9)
- Bobby Taylor – oboe (4)
- David Hamilton – string arrangements and conductor (4)
- Carl Gorodetzky – concertmaster (4)
- The Nashville String Machine – strings (4)
- Sally Jumper – backing vocals (3, 4, 9)
- Chris Rodriguez – lead vocals (5), backing vocals (5, 7), guitars (8)
- Nicole C. Mullen – backing vocals (7)
- D.L. Turnedge – backing vocals (7)

Production

- Judith Cotton Volz – executive producer, A&R direction
- Mark Heimmerman – producer (1–3, 5–10), additional production (4)
- Phil Naish – producer (4)
- Joe Baldridge – mixing, engineer (1–3, 5–10)
- Eric Elwell – engineer (1–3, 5–10)
- Todd Robbins – engineer (1–3, 5–10)
- Ronnie Brookshire – engineer (4)
- Dave Dillbeck – assistant engineer (4)
- Dean Jamison – assistant engineer (4)
- Joe Costa – mix assistant
- Mike Wrucke – mix assistant
- Hank Williams – mastering at MasterMix (Nashville, Tennessee)
- Kathi Dement – A&R coordination
- PJ Heimmerman – production manager (1–3, 5–10)
- Bridgett Evans O'Lannerghty – production coordinator (4)
- Christy Coxe – art direction
- Firehouse 101 Art + Design – design
- Matthew Barnes – photography
- Atkins, Muse & Associates – management

== Charts ==
Chart performance for Heavenly Place
Chart (1997)	Peak position
US Billboard 200	142
US Top Christian Albums (Billboard)	2
US Heatseekers Albums (Billboard)	4

== Certifications ==
Region	Certification	Certified units/sales
United States (RIAA)	Platinum	1,000,000^{^}
^{^} Shipments figures based on certification alone.
