= Trust (Jaci Velasquez album) =

Trust/Confío
- The Trust album cover, the Confío album cover is identical, with the Confío text replacing the Trust text

Studio album by Jaci Velasquez
- Released: March 31, 2017
- Recorded: 2016–2017
- Genre: Contemporary Christian music
- Length: 37:52
- Label: Integrity
- Producer: David Leonard, Chris Bevins

Jaci Velasquez chronology
| Buenas Noches Mi Sol (2012) | Trust/Confío (2017) |

Trust/Confío is the seventeenth studio album by Contemporary Christian music singer Jaci Velasquez, released on March 31, 2017, as a two-disc collection where one disc containsTrust, while the other disc contains her Spanish-language counterpart Confío. At the 48th GMA Dove Awards, Confío won Spanish Language Album of the Year. The album reached No. 7 on the Billboard Latin Pop chart and was nominated for the 2017 Latin Grammys for Christian Album of the Year.

== Awards and accolades ==
On August 9, 2017, the Gospel Music Association announced that Confio was nominated for a GMA Dove Award in the Spanish Album of the Year category at the 48th Annual GMA Dove Awards. On October 17, 2017, Confio won the GMA Dove Award for Spanish Album of the Year with producers David Leonard and Chris Bevins being the receipts at a ceremony at Allen Arena in Nashville, Tennessee.

== Track listing ==
| No. | Title | Spanish-language title | Length |
|---|---|---|---|
| 1. | "Trust You" | "Confío" | 3:20 |
| 2. | "I Will Call" | "Clamaré" | 4:41 |
| 3. | "God Who Moves the Mountains" | "Dios Que Mueve Montes" | 4:47 |
| 4. | "Great Is Your Faithfulness" | "Cuan Grande Fidelidad" | 4:26 |
| 5. | "It's Never As Dark As It Seems To Be" | "Nunca Es Tan Mal Como Aparente Ser" | 3:52 |
| 6. | "Great Are You Lord" (featuring Nic Gonzales) | "Grande Eres Dios" | 5:17 |
| 7. | "Lay It At the Cross" | "Llévalo A La Cruz" | 4:24 |
| 8. | "Rest" | "Descansaré" | 3:45 |
| 9. | "Praise the King" | "Gloria Al Rey" | 4:25 |
| 10. | "Sound of Your Kingdom" | "Sonido De Tu Reino" | 3:09 |
| Total length: | | | 42:06 |

== Charts ==
Chart performance for Trust
| Chart (2017) | Peak position |
|---|---|
| US Christian Album Sales (Billboard) | 33 |
| US Top Latin Albums (Billboard) | 25 |
| US Latin Pop Albums (Billboard) | 7 |
