= Mi Corazón =

Studio album by Jaci Velásquez
- Released: May 8, 2001
- Recorded: 2000–2001
- Studio: Crescent Moon Studios; EG's Recording Studios; Fun Attic Studios (Miami, FL); Gentleman's Club; North Bay Recording Studios (Miami Beach, FL); LA East Recording Studios (Los Angeles, CA); Opus 440 (Salt Lake City, UT); Opus Studios "A" (Cuernavaca, Morelos, Mexico)
- Genre: Latin pop; contemporary Christian; latin ballad
- Length: 53:14
- Label: Sony Discos
- Producer: Emilio Estefan, Jr. · Rudy Pérez · Desmond Child · Gaitán Bros. · Jules Gondar · Mark Heimermann · Alejandro Jaén · Manuel López · Lewis A. Martineé · Archie Peña · Freddy Piñero, Jr. · José Miguel Velásquez; Óscar Llord (Executive producer)

Jaci Velásquez chronology
Crystal Clear (2000)	Mi Corazón (2001)	Christmas (2001)

Professional ratings
Review scores
Source	Rating
AllMusic	3/5 stars

Mi Corazón (English: My Heart) is the eighth studio album and second made in Spanish recorded by American latin pop and contemporary Christian recording artist Jaci Velásquez. It was released by Sony Discos on May 8, 2001 (see 2001 in music). The album charted in the top 10 on both the Latin Pop Albums and Top Latin Albums charts. lead single, "Cómo Se Cura Una Herida", charted at No. 1 on the Billboard Hot Latin Tracks and Latin Pop Airplay chart. The album received a nomination for a Grammy Award for Best Latin Pop Album in the 44th Annual Grammy Awards on February 27, 2002, and it won a Dove Award for Best Spanish language album of the year.

== Track listing ==
No.	Title	Writer(s)	Length
1.	"Cómo Se Cura una Herida"	Jorge Luis Piloto, Rudy Pérez	04:32
2.	"Bendito Amor"	Emilio Estefan, Jr., Gian Marco Zigango	03:59
3.	"Lo Que Nunca Cambiaría"	Randall M. Barlow, Estefan, Jon Secada, Nicolás Tovar	03:37
4.	"Fuego De Amor"	Alejandro Jaén	04:14
5.	"Dueño De Mi Corazón"	Barry Graul, Mark Heimermann, Lissette Mélendez, Nate Sallier, Javier Solís	03:47
6.	"Sin Ti No Puedo Vivir"	Ricardo Gaitán, Alberto Gaitán, Estefan, Tony Mardini	03:46
7.	"Invierno De Mi Ser"	Desmond Child, Manuel López	04:19
8.	"Está Vez"	José Miguel Velásquez	03:54
9.	"Vida Mía" (With Ángel López)	Lewis A. Martineé	04:35
10.	"Déjame Quererte Para Siempre"	Pérez	04:35
11.	"Pensando En Mí" (English Version: You Don't Miss A Thing)	Nick G.	04:11
12.	"Vaya Con Dios"	Heimermann, Ínez James, Buddy Carper, Bert Russell, Larry Russell, Solís	03:26
13.	"Cómo Se Cura Una Herida" (Ranchera Version)	Piloto, Pérez	04:32
Total length:			53:15

== Singles ==
1. "Cómo Se Cura Una Herida" (a video was made for this song)
2. "Déjame Quererte Para Siempre"
3. "Dueño De Mi Corazón"

== Credits and personnel ==
=== Personnel ===
- Jackie Aguirre - background vocals
- Pedro Alfonso - violin
- Susana Allen - translation, background vocals
- Carlos Álvarez - mixing
- Marcelo Añez - engineer
- Gustavo Arenas - arranger
- Kenny Aronoff - drums
- Jeff Bailey - horn
- Richard Bravo - assistant engineer, percussion
- Ed Calle - saxophone
- Jorge Casas - basic track
- Dorian Caster - photography
- Andrés Castillo - violin
- Gustavo Celis - engineer, mixing
- Desmond Child - producer
- Brian Coleman - assistant engineer, production coordination
- Mike Couzzi - mixing, mixing engineer
- Jeannie Cruz - background vocals
- Sal Cuevas - bass
- Fernando de Santiago - guitar, vihuela
- Charles Dye - mixing, mixing engineer
- Rob Eaton - engineer, mixing
- Vicky Echeverri - vocals, background vocals
- Geronimo Enríquez - horn arrangements
- Emilio Estefan Jr. - producer
- Steve Fitzpatrick - hair stylist, make-up
- Alberto Gaitán - choir, chorus
- Ricardo Gaitán - arranger, choir, chorus, drum programming, keyboards, producer, programming
- Jules Gondar - engineer, producer
- Frank González - production coordination
- Jorge González - assistant engineer
- Roger González - assistant engineer
- Mike Haynes - horn
- Mark Heimermann - drum programming, keyboards, producer
- Julio Hernández - bass
- Alejandro Jaén - arranger, producer, background vocals
- Inez James - composer
- Ted Jensen - mastering
- Trevor Johnson - mixing
- Sebastian Krys - mixing engineer
- Gary Lindsay - vocal arrangement
- Óscar Llord - executive producer
- Álex López - art direction
- Ángel López - assistant producer
- Manuel López - arranger, engineer, guitar, producer, programming
- Craig Lozowick - engineer
- Steve MacMillan - mixing
- Judd Maher - conductor
- Nathan Malki - engineer
- Tony Mardini - assistant engineer, drum programming
- Lewis A. Martineé - arranger, assistant producer, engineer, keyboards, mixing, producer, programming
- Chris McDonald - horn
- Hugh McDonald - bass
- Lisette Mélendez - composer
- Miami Symphonic Orchestra - strings
- Raul Midón - choir, chorus, vocals
- Alfredo Oliva - concert comedian, concertina
- Abel Orta - bass, translation, background vocals
- Germán Ortíz - assistant engineer, engineer
- Mario Patiño - assistant coordinator
- Wendy Pederson - vocals
- Archie Peña - arranger, choir, chorus, cuatro, drum programming, guitar, percussion, producer, programming
- Buddy Pepper - composer
- Lena Pérez - choir, chorus, vocals
- Richie Pérez - engineer
- Rudy Pérez - arranger, direction, producer
- Clay Perry - keyboards, programming
- Rachel Perry - Choir, chorus, vocals
- Freddy Piñero Jr. - arranger, engineer, mixing, producer, programming, vocal arrangement
- Leo Quintero - acoustic and electric guitar
- Asolfo Ramos - cello
- Jimmy Rey - background vocals
- Michael Ripoll - guitar
- Todd Robbins - engineer
- Abel Romero - violin
- Jorge Ruiz - arranger, direction
- Bert Russell - composer
- Larry Russell - composer
- Marco Antonio Santiago - guitar
- Jon Secada - arranger, programming, vocal arrangement
- Javier Solís - percussion, translation
- Ricardo Suárez - bass, vocals
- Ramiro Teran - choir, chorus, vocals
- Ken Theis - assistant engineer
- Felipe Tichauer - engineer
- Jaci Velasquez - liner notes, vocals, background vocals
- José Miguel Velásquez - arranger, choir, chorus, producer, programming, vocals
- Dan Warner - acoustic and electric guitar
- Bruce Weeden - engineer, mixing, mixing engineer

© MMI. Sony Discos, Inc.

== Charts ==
=== Weekly charts ===
Chart (2001)	Peak position
US Top Latin Albums (Billboard)	7
US Latin Pop Albums (Billboard)	5

== Sales and certifications ==
Region	Certification	Certified units/sales
United States (RIAA)	Platinum (Latin)	100,000^{^}
^{^} Shipments figures based on certification alone.
