= Unspoken (Jaci Velasquez album) =

Studio album by Jaci Velasquez
- Released: March 25, 2003
- Recorded: 2002–2003
- Studios: The Lab (Santa Monica, California); The Parlor and The Compound (Nashville, Tennessee); Crescent Moon Studios (Miami, Florida)
- Genre: CCM
- Length: 45:39
- Label: Word
- Producers: Matthew Gerrard; Tommy Sims; Emilio Estefan, Jr., Tom McWilliams and Freddy Piñero Jr.; Jaci Velasquez, Jammes "Jamba" Castro, Nic Gonzales, Abel Orta, Scott Savage and Javier Solis

Jaci Velasquez chronology
Navidad (2001)	Unspoken (2003)	Milagro (2003)

Singles from Unspoken
- 1. "Unspoken"; 2. "Jesus Is"; 3. "Where I Belong"; 4. "You're My God"

Professional ratings
Review scores
Source	Rating
Allmusic	4/5 stars
Cross Rhythms UK	10/10 stars
Jesus Freak Hideout	3.5/5 stars

Unspoken is the tenth studio album by Contemporary Christian music singer Jaci Velasquez. It was released on March 25, 2003, debuting at No. 55 in the Billboard 200. Seven weeks later, it was off the charts. Nevertheless, it did extremely well in the Top Gospel Albums chart. It was the first English album by Velasquez that did not have a whole or partial Spanish song.

== Track listing ==
1. "You're My God" – 3:26 (Jaci Velasquez, Bridget Benenate, Matthew Gerrard)
2. "Jesus Is" – 3:47 (Jaci Velasquez, Bridget Benenate, Matthew Gerrard)
3. "Lost Without You" – 4:11 (Bridget Benenate)
4. "Where I Belong" – 4:18 (Jaci Velasquez, Bridget Benenate, Matthew Gerrard)
5. "The Real Me" – 3:40 (Jaci Velasquez, Bridget Benenate)
6. "He" – 3:34 (Hunter Davis, Chris Faulk)
7. "Glass House" – 3:41 (Jaci Velasquez, Bridget Benenate, Tom McWilliams)
8. "Your Friend" – 3:45 (Jaci Velasquez, Abel Orta, Javier Solís)
9. "Something" – 3:20 (Hunter Davis, Chris Faulk)
10. "Unspoken" – 3:26 (Madeline Stone, Orrin Hatch, Toby Gad)
11. "I'm Alive" – 4:15 (Jaci Velasquez, Cindy Morgan)
12. "Shine" – 4:09 (Dillon O'Brien, Dillon O'Doherty)

== Personnel ==
- Jaci Velasquez – vocals
- Matthew Gerrard – keyboards (1–5, 10, 11), programming (1–5, 10, 11), guitars (1–5, 10, 11), bass guitar (1–5, 10, 11)
- Brandon Fraley – keyboards (6, 9), programming (6, 8), loops (6, 9), acoustic piano (9)
- Freddy Piñero, Jr. – programming (7), electric guitars (7)
- Jammes "Jamba" Castro – keyboards (8)
- Pete Orta – electric guitars (6, 12)
- Michael Ripoll – Spanish guitars (6), sitar (6), acoustic guitars (9, 12)
- Tom McWilliams – guitars (7)
- Nic Gonzales – guitars (8)
- Tommy Sims – electric bass (6), synth bass (6), keyboards (9), Minimoog (9), Moog bass (9), acoustic guitar (9, 12), rhythm box (9), acoustic piano (12), bass guitar (12), loops (12)
- Javier Carrión – bass (7)
- Abel Orta – bass guitar (8), backing vocals (8)
- Marvin Sims – drums (6, 12)
- Scott Savage – drums (8)
- Javier Solís – percussion (6, 8, 9, 12)
- John Catchings – cello (8)
- David Davidson – violin (8)
- Bridget Benenate – backing vocals (1–5, 10, 11)
- Rachel Perry – backing vocals (7)

The Positive Group vocals on "Shine"

- Melinda Doolittle
- Billy Gaines
- Angela Primm
- Dana Reed
- Akil Thompson
- Roz Thompson
- Jovaun Woods

=== Production ===
- Barry Landis – A&R direction
- Dion Lopez – A&R direction
- Jaci Velasquez – A&R direction, producer (8)
- Matthew Gerrard – producer (1–5, 10, 11), arrangements (1–5, 10, 11)
- Tommy Sims – producer (6, 9, 12), arrangements (6, 9, 12)
- Emilio Estefan, Jr. – producer (7)
- Tom McWilliams – producer (7), arrangements (7)
- Freddy Piñero, Jr. – producer (7), arrangements (7)
- Jammes "Jamba" Castro – producer (8)
- Nic Gonzales – producer (8)
- Abel Orta – producer (8)
- Scott Savage – producer (8)
- Javier Solís – producer (8)
- Linda Bourne Wornell – A&R coordination
- Cheryl H. McTyre – A&R administration
- Jamie Kiner – production coordination (6, 8, 9, 12)
- Tammie Harris Cleek – creative administrator
- Ray Roper – art direction, design
- Alban Christ – photography
- Christine Megia – hair
- Leslie Lopez – make-up
- Stephan Campbell – stylist
- Mike Atkins – management

Technical credits

- Tom Coyne – mastering at Sterling Sound (New York, NY)
- David J. Holman – mixing at Cactus Studios (Los Angeles, California)
- Matthew Gerrard – recording (1–5, 10, 11)
- Brian Brandon – recording (6, 9, 12), second engineer (6, 9, 12)
- Danny Duncan – recording (6, 9, 12)
- Bryan Lenox – recording (6, 9, 12)
- Freddy Piñero, Jr. – recording (7)
- Aaron Swihart – recording (8)
- Drew Douthit – digital editing (6, 9, 12)
- Jorge Felix – recording assistant (7)
- Ken Theis – recording assistant (7)
- Andy Roddick – assistant engineer (8)

== Charts ==
Chart performance for Unspoken
Chart (1997)	Peak position
US Billboard 200	55
US Top Christian Albums (Billboard)	2
