= Christmas (Jaci Velasquez album) =

Studio album by Jaci Velasquez
- Released: September 18, 2001
- Recorded: 2001
- Studio: Bulldog Studio, House of Big, Fun Attic Studios and Sound Kitchen (Franklin, Tennessee); Bridgeway Studios (Nashville, Tennessee); Capitol Studios (Hollywood, California); Bethel Lutheran Church (Cupertino, California); Windmill Lane Studios (Dublin, Ireland).
- Genre: Contemporary Christian music, Christmas music
- Label: Word Entertainment
- Producer: Christopher Harris

Jaci Velasquez chronology
Mi Corazon (2001)	Christmas (2001)	Unspoken (2003)

Christmas is the ninth studio album by contemporary Christian singer Jaci Velasquez. The album was released on September 18, 2001, under Word Entertainment. She toured in November and December 2001 to support the album. A Spanish-language version of the album, Navidad, was released on November 6, 2001.

== Description and reviews ==
Professional ratings
Review scores
Source	Rating
AllMusic	3/5 stars
Jesus Freak Hideout	4.5/5 stars

Velasquez described the album, "For my ideal Christmas album, I wanted to record the songs I have always loved, done in their original arrangements, to make an album that will sound good now but will also sound good years from now." The related review indicated that it blends traditional 1950s style arrangements with the pop Velasquez had come to be known for. Reviewer John DiBiase called it "a creative, fun, traditional Christmas project that will touch the hearts of all ages" and "one of the best-orchestrated Christmas projects put out in the contemporary Christian music to date."

AllMusic gave the album 3 out of 5 stars saying it is "beautifully orchestrated with touches of traditional Christmas-style jazz and contemporary pop."

== Charts ==
The album peaked on the Billboard 200 at No. 102 and No. 6 on Billboard's Top Contemporary Christian Albums charts.

== Track listing ==
No.	Title	Writer(s)	"Spanish-language title	Length
1.	"O Come, O Come, Emmanuel"	Traditional	"Oh Ven, Oh Ven, Emmanuel"	02:07
2.	"The Angel Song"	Chris Eaton	"La Canción Del Angel"	04:49
3.	"The First Noel"	Traditional	"El Rey De Israel"	03:20
4.	"White Christmas"	Irving Berlin	"Navidades Blancas"	03:34
5.	"It Wouldn't Be Christmas"	Scott Krippayne	"Si Tú No Estuvieras Conmigo En Navidad"	04:25
6.	"Have Yourself A Merry Little Christmas"	Hugh Martin; Ralph Blane	"Hoy Qué Es Navidad"	02:32
7.	"Let It Snow, Let It Snow, Let It Snow!"	Sammy Cahn; Jule Styne	"Navidad, Navidad, Navidad"	02:38
8.	"I'll Be Home For Christmas"	Buck Ram; Kim Gannon; Walter Kent		04:08
9.	"Season Of Love (With Pete Orta)"	Hunter Davis; George Cocchini; Chris Faulk	"Tiempo De Amar"	04:31
10.	"The Christmas Song (Chestnuts Roasting on an Open Fire)"	Mel Tormé; Robert Wells		03:19
11.	"O Little Town Of Bethlehem"	Phillips Brooks; Lewis Redner; Ralph Vaughan Williams		05:32
12.	"Feliz Navidad"	José Feliciano		03:11
13.	"The Chipmunk Song (Christmas Don't Be Late) Duet With Alvin and the Chipmunks"	Ross Bagdasarian		02:32
Total length:				46:26

Notes

- The album contains three original tracks (including "The Angel Song") plus a series of covers of Christmas classics.

== Personnel ==
- Jaci Velasquez – vocals
- Kent Hooper – keyboards (1, 12, 13), programming (2, 9)
- Tim Akers – acoustic piano (5)
- Scott Krippayne – acoustic piano (5)
- Gary Burnette – guitars (2, 9)
- David Cleveland – guitars (2, 9)
- George Cocchini – guitars (2, 9)
- Michael Ripoll – guitars (12, 13)
- Ronnie Brooks – guitars (13)
- Danny O'Lannerghty – bass guitar (2, 5, 9, 13), instrumental section (5)
- Abel Orta – bass guitar (12)
- John Hammond – drums (2, 5, 9)
- Javier Solis – drums (12)
- Taylor Harris – drums (13)
- Ken Lewis – percussion (1, 2, 9, 12)
- David Davidson – strings (1, 9, 12)
- Sam Levine – horns (7)
- Doug Moffett – horns (7)
- Denis Solee – horns (7)
- Ernie Collins – horns (7)
- Chris Dunn – horns (7)
- Barry Green – horns (7)
- Chris McDonald – horns (7), horn arrangements (7)
- Jeff Bailey – horns (7)
- Steve Patrick – horns (7)
- Mike Haynes – trumpet (12)
- Mark Douthit – saxophone (13)
- The Irish Film Orchestra – orchestra
- Christopher Harris – backing vocals, arrangements (1), vocal arrangements (2, 6, 8, 9), Chipmunk singing vocals (13)
- Tom Howard – arrangerments (3, 11), orchestra arrangements and conductor
- Alan Moore – vocal arrangements (3, 4, 11)
- Leanne Albrecht – backing vocals
- Lisa Bevill – backing vocals
- Lisa Cochran – backing vocals
- Tim Davis – backing vocals
- Mark Ivey – backing vocals
- Michael Mellett – backing vocals
- Felicia Sorensen – backing vocals
- Pete Orta – vocals (9)
- Gary Pigg – Chipmunk singing vocals (13)
- Ross and Janice Bagdasarian – Chipmunk speaking (13)

Children vocalists on "Feliz Navidad" and the Christmas Kids on "The Chipmunk Song"

- Ashley Anderson, Anna Flautt, Brandon Harris, Margaret Patton, Gabe Pigg and Landon Pigg

=== Production ===
- Judith Volz – executive producer, A&R direction
- Christopher Harris – producer
- Kent Hooper – recording, mixing (13)
- James "JB" Baird – recording
- Dan Garcia – overdub recording
- Fred Paragano – overdub recording
- David Sandwisch – overdub recording
- Andrew Bolland – orchestra recording
- Trevor Johnson – orchestra recording assistant
- Emma Jane Lennon – orchestra recording assistant
- Kieran Lynch – orchestra recording assistant
- Melissa Mattey – orchestra recording assistant
- Tom Laune – mixing (1, 3–8, 10–12)
- Rob Burrell – mix assistant (1, 3–8, 10–12)
- Steve MacMillan – mixing (2, 9)
- Robert Hadley – mastering
- Doug Sax – mastering
- The Mastering Lab (Hollywood, California) – mastering location
- PJ Heimmernman – production manager
- Jamie Kiner – production manager
- Dion Velasquez – production manager
- Astrid Herbold May – art direction, design
- Dorian Carter – photography

== Singles ==
1. "The Chipmunk Song (Christmas Don't Be Late)" duet with Alvin and the Chipmunks
2. "Feliz Navidad"
3. "The First Noel"

== Charts ==
=== Weekly charts ===
Chart (1997)	Peak position
US Billboard 200	102
US Christian Albums (Billboard)	6
US Top Holiday Albums (Billboard)	5
