= Duermete Mi Niño =

Spanish lullaby

"Duermete Mi Niño" is a Spanish lullaby. An alternative lyric is "Duerme mi Nino". The song's title means "(Fall as)sleep, my baby".
