= Love Out Loud (album) =

Studio album by Jaci Velasquez
- Released: March 18, 2008
- Recorded: 2007–2008
- Studio: The Olive Room (Nashville, Tennessee): Dark Horse Recording (Franklin, Tennessee)
- Genre: Contemporary Christian music
- Length: 37:52
- Label: A'postrophe
- Producer: Mark Heimermann

Jaci Velasquez chronology
| Open House (2007) | Love Out Loud (2008) | Diamond (2012) |

Singles from Love Out Loud
- 1. "Love Out Loud"; 2. "Jesus (The Way)"; 3. "Into the Light Again"; 4. "Tango"; 5. "Nothing but Sky"

Professional ratings
Review scores
| Source | Rating |
|---|---|
| AllMusic | 3.5/5 stars |
| Jesus Freak Hideout | 4/5 stars |

Love Out Loud is the fourteenth studio album by Jaci Velasquez, released on March 18, 2008.

== Background ==
On the heels of the tenth anniversary celebration of her debut platinum selling album, Heavenly Place, Velasquez returned to the studio to write and record Love Out Loud. Velasquez once again teamed-up with Mark Heimermann, the producer of her first three albums. The lead single is "Love Out Loud" that speaks of putting one's words into action to show others God's love through us.

== Track listing ==
1. "Nothing But Sky" – 3:25 (written by Madeline Stone and Dennis Matkosky)
2. "It's Not You It's Me" – 3:53 (written by Jaci Velasquez, Tony Lucido and John Glover)
3. "Love Out Loud" – 4:07 (written by Jaci Velasquez, Mark Heimermann and Judson Spence)
4. "Jesus (The Way)" – 3:33 (written by John Glover)
5. "My Alleluia (When Words Fail)" – 3:43 (written by Mark Heimermann and Kyle Matthews)
6. "Weightless" – 4:26 (written by Mark Heimermann)
7. "Likely Story" – 4:01 (written by Jaci Velasquez and Mark Heimermann)
8. "Tango" – 3:02 (written by Jaci Velasquez and Mark Heimermann)
9. "Por Escrito " – 3:00 written by (Jaci Velasquez and Alexis Puentes)
10. "Into the Light Again" – 3:48 (written by Jaci Velasquez, Mark Heimermann and Heather Garborg)
11. "Nothing But Sky (Outro)" – 1:03
12. "Love Out Loud" (acoustic demo version) iTunes pre-order bonus track (written by Jaci Velasquez, Mark Heimermann and Judson Spence)

== Personnel ==
- Jaci Velasquez – vocals, backing vocals (1–4, 7, 8, 10)
- Mark Heimmerman – keyboards (1–4, 7, 8, 10), programming (1–4, 7, 8, 10), backing vocals (1–3, 8, 10), acoustic piano (5)
- Adam Lester – guitars (1–4, 7, 8, 10)
- Justin York – additional guitars (1–3, 6, 10)
- Jerry McPherson – guitars (5, 6)
- Michael Ripoll – additional guitars (8), guitars (9)
- Akil Thompson – bass (1–4, 7–10)
- Brent Milligan – bass (5, 6)
- Dan Needham – drums (1–8, 10)
- Javier Solis – percussion (1–4, 7–10)
- Nic Gonzales – vocals (9)
- Heather Garborg – backing vocals (10)

String Section

- Mark Heimermann and David Davidson – arrangements
- David Angell, John Catchings, David Davidson and Kristin Wilkinson – string players
- Monisa Angell, Bruce Christensen, Conni Ellisor, Jim Grosjean, Anthony LaMarchina, Bob Mason, Pamela Sixfin, Elizabeth Stewart, Julie Tanner and Karen Winklemann – additional strings on "My Alleluia (When Words Fail)"

Angel Choir on "My Alleluia (When Words Fail)"

- Amy Delaine, Jan Harris, Julie Koblish, Elinor, Sara Posthuma, Chris Wise and Joy Wise

== Production ==
- Mark Heimermann – producer, additional engineer
- Todd Robbins – recording
- Bobby Shin – string recording
- Michael Modesto – additional engineer
- Glenn Spinner – additional engineer
- Steve MacMillan – mixing
- PJ Heimermann – production coordinator
- Tyler Rogers – art direction, design
- Kristin Barlowe – photography

== Charts ==
Chart performance for Love Out Loud
| Chart (2012) | Peak position |
|---|---|
| US Christian Albums (Billboard) | 21 |
