= Milagro (Jaci Velasquez album) =

2003 studio album by Jaci Velásquez

Studio album by Jaci Velásquez
- Released: April 1, 2003
- Recorded: October 2002 – March 2003
- Studio: L.A. East Recording Studio (Salt Lake City, UT); Falcon Studios; K. Cooper Studios; Dark House Recording Studios (Nashville, TN); Crescent Moon Studios; EQ's Recording Studios; Midnight Blue Studios; Music Futura Studios (Miami, FL); North Bay Recording Studios (Miami Beach, FL); Sound On Sound Recording Studios (New York City, NY); String Studio; The Lab
- Genre: Latin pop; contemporary Christian; latin ballad
- Length: 44:37
- Language: Spanish
- Label: Sony Discos
- Producer: Emilio Estefan, Jr.; Estéfano; Randall M. Barlow; Manny López; Matthew Gerrard; Alejandro Jaén; Rudy Pérez; Óscar Llord (Exec.)

Jaci Velásquez chronology
Unspoken (2003)	Milagro (2003)	Mi Historia Musical (2004)

Milagro (English: Miracle) is the eleventh studio album by Contemporary Christian music singer Jaci Velasquez. The album was released by Sony Discos on April 1, 2003 (see 2003 in music). This record won a Billboard Latin Music Award in the category "Best Christian Album". Although lyrically considered the most secular of all her works, the album was not as successful as her previous Spanish works due to Sony Discos changing hands in management that same year and a lack of promotion. The album was nominated at the Latin Grammy Award for Best Female Pop Vocal Album at the 5th Annual Latin Grammy Awards, losing to De Mil Colores by Rosario.

== Track listing ==
No.	Title	Writer(s)	Producer (es)	Length
1.	"El Centro De Mi Corazón"	Estéfano; Julio C. Reyes	Estéfano	04:21
2.	"No Hace Falta Un Hombre"	Bridget Benenate; Jaci Velásquez; Adapt: Spanish: Alejandro Jaén; Juliana Barrios	Matthew Gerrard	03:54
3.	"Milagro"	Jon Secada; Adapt: Spanish: Nicolás Tovar · Emilio Estefan, Jr.	Emilio Estefan, Jr. · Randall M. Barlow	04:32
4.	"Un Trocito de Cielo"	Alejandro Jaén; Antonio Rayo "Rayito"; Rafael Vergara	Alejandro Jaén	03:25
5.	"Perdida Sin Tí"	Estéfano	Estéfano	03:39
6.	"Eres Tan Grande"	Javier Díaz; Rafael Vergara	Alejandro Jaén	03:55
7.	"A Un Paso De Mi Amor" (Just A Prayer Away)	Mark Portmann · Elizabeth Pérez · Rudy Pérez · Jorge Luis Piloto; Adapt: Spanish: Rudy Pérez	Rudy Pérez	04:30
8.	"Me Valga Dios"	Estéfano	Estéfano	04:08
9.	"Es Amor"	Cristina Faulk · Hunter Davis; Adapt: Spanish: Manny López	Emilio Estefan, Jr. · Manny López · Randall M. Barlow	04:02
10.	"A Tú Lado Es Mi Lugar" (Where I Belong)	Bridget Benenate · Jaci Velásquez; Adapt: Spanish: Alejandro Jaén · Érika Ender	Matthew Gerrard	04:13
11.	"Mi Vida No Es Nada De Tí"			04:09
Total length:				44:38

== Singles ==
1. "No Hace Falta Un Hombre" (a video was made for this song)
- "A Un Paso De Mi Amor", the Spanish version of "Just a Prayer Away", is only based musically but not lyrically.
- "Mi Vida No Es Nada Sin Ti" is the Spanish version of "Can't Stay Away from You" by Gloria Estefan.
- "No Hace Falta Un Hombre" was the theme song in the film Chasing Papi.

== Credits and personnel ==
=== Personnel ===
- Diego Acosta – assistant engineer
- N. Amador – assistant engineer
- Tommy Anthony – background vocals
- Randall Barlow – composer, producer
- Bridget Benenate – composer
- Kurt Berge – technical support
- Andrés Bermúdez – engineer, mixing
- Scott Canto – engineer
- Alban Christ – photography
- Hunter Davis – composer
- Kevin Dillon – production coordination
- Vicky Echeverri – choir, chorus, background vocals
- Emilio Estefan, Jr. – composer, producer
- Gloria Estefan – composer
- Estéfano – producer
- Mike Fuller – mastering
- Javier Garza – mixing engineer
- Mauricio Gasca – programming, background vocals
- Matthew Gerrard – arranger, composer, engineer, instrumentation, mixing, producer
- Julio Hernández – bass
- David J. Holman – mixing
- Alejandro Jaén – producer, background vocals
- Amado Jaén – composer
- Leyla Leeming – production coordination
- Lee Levin - drums, batería
- Óscar Llord – executive producer
- Alejandro López – art direction, graphic design
- Dionicio R. Lopez – A&R
- Manny López – composer, guitar
- Steve Menezes – studio coordinator
- Bart Migal – engineer
- Mario Patiño – general assistance, text
- Andy Pechenik – technical support
- Wendy Pederson – choir, chorus
- Archie Pena – percussion
- Betsy Perez – production coordination
- Lena Pérez – background vocals
- Rudy Pérez – arranger, choir, chorus, composer, engineer, producer, string arrangements
- Clay Perry – arranger, keyboards, programming
- Jorge Luis piloto – composer
- Daniel Ponce – assistant engineer
- Mark Portmann – composer
- Julio C. Reyes – arranger, composer, piano, programming
- Jon Secada – composer
- Ron Taylor – engineer
- Ramiro Terán – choir, chorus
- Ken Theis – assistant engineer
- E. Thomas – background vocals
- Michael Hart thompson – guitar
- Nicolás Tovar – composer
- Gisa Vatcky – background vocals
- Jaci Velásquez – composer
- Dan Warner – acoustic guitar, electric guitar
- Bruce Weeden – mixing engineer
- Betty Wright – choir, chorus

== Charts ==
Chart (2003)	Peak position
US Top Latin Albums (Billboard)	24
US Latin Pop Albums (Billboard)	9
