= Crystal Clear (Jaci Velasquez album) =

Studio album by Jaci Velasquez
- Released: September 5, 2000
- Recorded: 1999–2000
- Genre: Contemporary Christian, soft rock
- Length: 43:35
- Label: Word Entertainment
- Producer: Mark Heimmerman, Rudy Pérez

Jaci Velasquez chronology
Llegar A Ti (1999)	Crystal Clear (2000)	Mi Corazón (2001)

Professional ratings
Review scores
Source	Rating
AllMusic	3/5 stars
Jesus Freak Hideout	4/5 stars

Crystal Clear is the seventh studio album by contemporary Christian artist Jaci Velasquez. It was released in 2000 on Word Entertainment. The album includes two versions; the booklet of one includes only two photographs - one on the cover and the other on the last page of the booklet. The other version is stapled together as a book and includes different artwork and more photographs inside. The album was nominated for the 2001 Grammy Award for Best Pop/Contemporary Gospel Album.

== Track listing ==
Album release
No.	Title	Writer(s)	Length
1.	"Escúchame (Listen To Me)"	Mark Heimermann, Jaci Velasquez	03:14
2.	"Crystal Clear"	Tiffany Arbuckle, Matt Stanfield	03:50
3.	"Every Time I Fall"	Jeremy Bose, Paul Evans	03:27
4.	"You're Not There"	Heimermann, Velasquez	04:02
5.	"Adore"	Brent Bourgeois, Chris Eaton	04:13
6.	"He's My Savior"	Eaton	04:18
7.	"You Don't Miss A Thing"	Brad Ford, Heimermann, Javier Solís	04:11
8.	"Imagine Me Without You"	Rudy Pérez	04:11
9.	"Come As You Are" (Featuring Luis Fonsi)	Loren Balman, Rudy Pérez, Judith Volz	03:30
10.	"Center Of Your Love" (Featuring Michael Tait Of dc Talk)	Heimermann, Pete Stewart	04:21
11.	"Just A Prayer Away"	Portmann, Rudy Pérez	04:28
Total length:			43:35

== Personnel ==
- Jaci Velasquez – lead vocals, backing vocals (1, 8, 9)
- Mark Heimmerman – additional sounds (2), keyboards (3–7), programming (3–7), backing vocals (3, 4)
- Rudy Pérez – keyboards (8, 9), programming (8, 9), arrangements (8, 9, 11), string arrangements (8), backing vocals (8), additional keyboards (11), additional programming (11)
- Mark Portmann – keyboards (8, 11), programming (8, 11), arrangements (8, 11)
- Lester Mendez – keyboards (9), programming (9)
- George Cocchini – guitars (1–7, 10)
- Ramón Stagnaro – guitars (8)
- Michael Thompson – guitars (8, 11)
- Chris Rodriguez – guitars (9, 11)
- Jackie Street – bass (1, 2, 4, 6, 7, 10)
- Neil Stubenhaus – bass (8)
- Scott Williamson – drums (1, 2, 4, 6, 7, 10)
- Javier Solis – percussion (1–4, 6, 7, 10)
- Geronimo Enriquez – horns (1, 7), horn arrangements (1, 7)
- Edward Beritez – horns (1, 7)
- Robert Lopez – horns (1, 7)
- Carl Marsh – string arrangements (5)
- Carl Gorodetzky and The Nashville String Machine – strings (5)
- Randall Thornton – string conductor (8)
- Larry Womlow – music copyist (8)
- The Utah Symphony – strings (8)
- David Davidson – strings (10)
- Paul Garcia – backing vocals (1)
- Abel Orta – backing vocals (1)
- Yvonne Solis – backing vocals (1)
- Lisa Bevill – backing vocals (2, 3, 5, 7)
- Perry Heimmerman – backing vocals (4)
- Peyton Heimmerman – backing vocals (4)
- Wendy Pederson – backing vocals (8, 11)
- Betty Wright – backing vocals (8, 11)
- Luis Fonsi – lead and backing vocals (9)
- Michael Tait – backing vocals (10)
- Lisa Cochran – backing vocals (11)
- Jonathan Fuzessy – backing vocals (11)
- Chris Harris – backing vocals (11)
- Carl Ramsey – backing vocals (11)
- Margaret Reynolds – backing vocals (11)

Production

- Judith Volz – executive producer, A&R direction, vocal producer (8),
- Mark Heimmerman – producer (1–7, 10)
- Rudy Pérez – producer (8, 9, 11)
- Loren Balman – vocal producer (8)
- Brown Bannister – vocal producer (9)
- Brent Bourgeois – lead vocal producer (11)
- Chris Harris – BGV producer (11)
- Todd Robbins – track recording (1–7, 10), overdub recording (1–7, 10), Pro Tools editing (1–7, 10)
- Joel Numa – recording (8)
- Bruce Weeden – recording (8, 10), mixing (10)
- Steve Bishir – recording (9)
- David Schober – recording (10)
- Shaun Disch – recording assistant (1–7, 10), mix assistant (1, 4, 5, 7, 10)
- Trevor Johnson – recording assistant (1–7, 10), mix assistant (1, 4, 5, 7, 10)
- Chris Mara – recording assistant (1–7, 10)
- Shawn McIntire – recording assistant (8)
- Felipe Tischauer – recording assistant (8–10)
- Hank Nirider – recording assistant (9, 10)
- Steve MacMillan – mixing (1, 4, 5, 7, 10)
- Tom Laune – mixing (2, 3, 6), recording (8, 10)
- David Cole – mixing (8)
- Ronnie Thomas – digital editing
- Paul Angelli – mastering at Sterling Sound, New York City
- Linda Bourne Wornell – A&R coordinator
- PJ Heimmerman – production manager (1–7, 10)
- Dion Velasquez – production manager (1–7, 10)
- Chuck Hargett – art direction
- Astrid Herbold – design
- Tony Baker – photography
- Chad Curry – wardrobe
- Katinka – hair stylist, make-up

Studios

- Bulldog Studios, Franklin, Tennessee - recording, mixing
- The Sound KitchenFranklin, Tennessee - recording
- Bridgeway Studios, Nashville, Tennessee - recording, mixing
- North Bay Recording Studios, Miami Beach, Florida - recording, mixing
- On the Mark Studio, Los Angeles, California - recording
- Cocoa Butt Studio, Culver City, California - recording
- L.A. East Recording Studio, Salt Lake City, Utah - recording
- Fun Attic Studios, Franklin, Tennessee - overdubs (1–7, 10)
- MasterMix, Nashville, Tennessee - editing

== Singles ==
1. "Imagine Me Without You" (No. 1 on the CCM chart)
2. "Every Time I Fall" (No. 1 on the CCM chart)
3. "Adore" (No. 1 on the CCM chart; a music video was made for this song)
4. "Just a Prayer Away" (No. 1 on the CCM chart)
5. "Center of Your Love" (No. 1 on the CCM chart)

== Charts ==
Chart performance for Crystal Clear
Chart (2000)	Peak position
US Billboard 200	49
US Christian Albums (Billboard)	3

== Certifications ==
Region	Certification	Certified units/sales
United States (RIAA)	Gold	500,000^{^}
^{^} Shipments figures based on certification alone.
