= Jaci Velasquez (album) =

Studio album by Jaci Velasquez
- Released: June 2, 1998
- Recorded: 1997–1998
- Studios: Fun Attic Studios, The Bennett House and Dark Horse Studios (Franklin, Tennessee); The Border and Sixteenth Avenue Sound (Nashville, Tennessee); Barking Doctor Recording (Mount Kisco, New York)
- Genres: Contemporary Christian music; Pop; Rock
- Length: 50:25
- Label: Myrrh
- Producers: Mark Heimmerman; Chris Harris

Jaci Velasquez chronology
Heavenly Place (1996)	Jaci Velasquez (1998)	Llegar A Ti (1999)

Professional ratings
Review scores
Source	Rating
AllMusic	4/5 stars

Jaci Velasquez is the self-titled fifth studio album by Contemporary Christian singer Jaci Velasquez. It was released in 1998 on Myrrh Records.

== Track listing ==
No.	Title	Writer(s)	Length
1.	"God So Loved"	Chris Eaton	04:59
2.	"Show You Love"	Mark Heimermann	04:31
3.	"Little Voice Inside"	Chris Harris; Joey Elwood; Toby McKeehan	04:37
4.	"You"	Michelle Tumes	03:39
5.	"Look What Love Has Done"	Rob Mathes; Stephanie Lewis	04:39
6.	"Child Of Mine"	Chris Eaton; Ralph Van Mannen	04:05
7.	"Speak For Me"	Mark Heimermann; Toby McKeehan	04:10
8.	"Glory"	Jim Boggia; Andy Kravitz	03:30
9.	"Sweet Surrender"	Mark Heimermann; Wayne Kirkpatrick	03:41
10.	"Paper Tigers"	Mark Heimermann; Wayne Kirkpatrick; George Cocchini	04:11
11.	"Made My World"	Sheri Shaw; Mark Heimermann	03:27
12.	"Al Mundo Dios Amó" (Spanish version of "God So Loved")	Chris Eaton; David Velasquez	05:08
Total length:			50:26

- Track information and credits were taken from the CD liner notes.

== Personnel ==
- Jaci Velasquez – lead vocals, backing vocals (2, 3, 10, 11)
- Mark Heimmerman – keyboards (1, 3–10, 12), backing vocals (1, 6, 10), drum programming (6), acoustic piano (7), string programming (7)
- Phil Madeira – Hammond B3 organ (3)
- Blair Masters – acoustic piano (4)
- Mark Hammond – keyboards (5), all programming (5)
- Tony Miracle – all programming (8)
- George Cocchini – guitars (1–8, 10–12)
- Jerry McPherson – guitars (1–4, 7, 10–12)
- Dann Huff – guitars (9)
- Jackie Street – bass (1–5, 7–12)
- Dan Needham – drums (1–3, 7, 11, 12)
- Scott Williamson – drums (4, 9, 10)
- Terry McMillan – percussion (1, 3, 9, 10, 12)
- The Nashville String Machine – strings (3–5)
- Tom Howard – string arrangements (3, 4)
- Carl Marsh – string arrangements (5)
- Lisa Bevill – backing vocals (1, 12)
- Dana Glover – backing vocals (1)
- Michael Tait – backing vocals (2)
- Michelle Tumes – backing vocals (3–5, 7, 9)
- Anointed – backing vocals (8)
- Melody Chambers – backing vocals (11)
- Lisa Cochran – backing vocals (12)

=== Production ===
- Judith Volz – executive producer, A&R direction
- Mark Heimmerman – producer
- Chris Harris – producer (12)
- Robert "Void" Caprio – engineer
- Eric Elwell – engineer
- Tom Laune – engineer, mixing (5, 9)
- Todd Robbins – engineer
- David Schober – engineer
- Joe Baldridge – mixing (1–3, 6–8, 10–12)
- Mick Guzauski – mixing (4)
- Jim McCaslin – assistant engineer
- Joe Costa – mix assistant (1–3, 6–8, 10–12)
- Tom Bender – mix assistant (4)
- Greg Parker – mix assistant (5, 9)
- Steve Hall – mastering at Future Disc (Hollywood, California)
- Jamie Kiner – A&R coordination
- Beth Lee – art direction
- Astrid Herbold – design
- Michael Haber – photography
- Terri Apanasewicz – hair, make-up
- Annie Sprang – stylist
- Mike Atkins – management

== Singles ==
1. "Glory" - No. 1
2. "God So Loved" (A videoclip was made for this song)- No. 1
3. "Speak for Me" - No. 1
4. "Show You Love" - No. 1

== Charts ==
Chart performance for Jaci Velasquez
Chart (1998)	Peak position
US Billboard 200	56
US Top Christian Albums (Billboard)	1

== Certifications ==
Region	Certification	Certified units/sales
United States (RIAA)	Gold	500,000^{^}
^{^} Shipments figures based on certification alone.
