= Nicole C. Mullen =

American singer (born 1967)

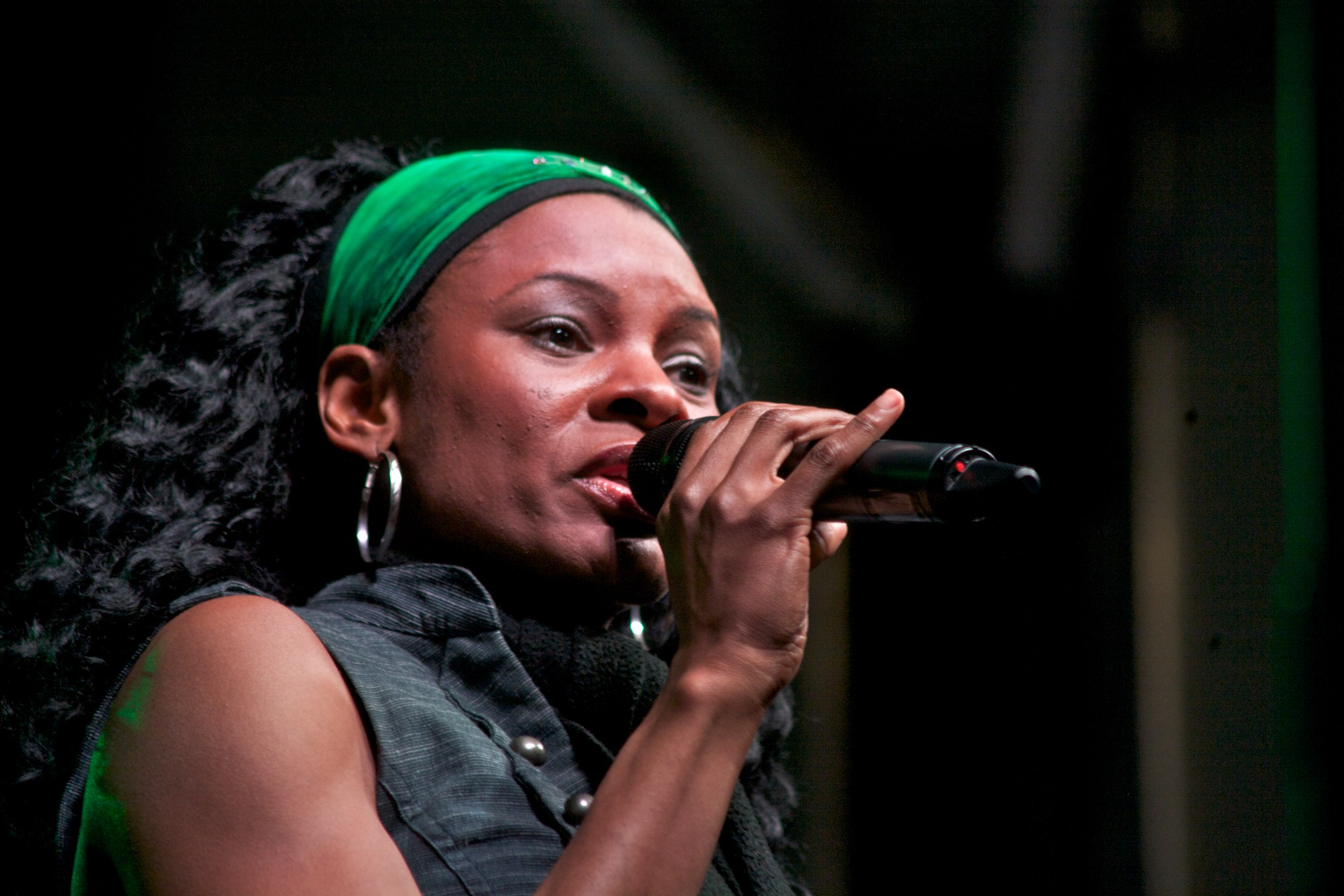
- Mullen performing in 2011

Background information
- Born: Aileen Nicole Coleman; January 3, 1967 (age 59); Cincinnati, Ohio
- Origin: Rockwall, Texas
- Genres: Contemporary Christian, contemporary gospel
- Occupations: Singer, songwriter, choreographer
- Instruments: Voice, guitar
- Years active: 1991–present
- Labels: Frontline, Word
- Spouse: Unnamed (m. 1988) David Mullen (m. 1992–2014) Stacey A. Scott (m. 2020)
- Website: www.nicolecmullen.com

Aileen Nicole Coleman-Mullen, known professionally as Nicole C. Mullen, (born January 3, 1967) is an American singer, songwriter, and choreographer. She was born and raised in Cincinnati, Ohio.

== Personal life ==
During Mullen's first marriage, she endured physical and mental abuse. In 1993, she married singer, songwriter and music producer David Mullen. They divorced in 2014. In a Facebook post, she cited "Biblical reasons" for the divorce. In 2021, she married Stacey A. Scott.

== Discography ==
=== Studio albums ===
List of albums, with selected chart positions and sales figures
Title	Album details	Peak chart positions			Certifications (sales threshold)
Title	Album details	US	US Christ.	US Gospel	Certifications (sales threshold)
Don't Let Me Go	Released: January 1, 1991; Labels: Frontline (FLD9232); Formats: CD, digital download	—	—	—	
Wish Me Love	Released: January 1, 1992; Labels: Frontline; Formats: CD, digital download	—	—	—	
Nicole C. Mullen	Released: April 18, 2000; Labels: Word (#88599); Formats: CD, cassette, digital download	—	16	—	
Talk About It	Released: August 28, 2001; Labels: Word, Sony; Formats: CD, digital download	123	3	—	US: Gold
Christmas in Black and White	Released: September 17, 2002; Labels: Word (#886213); Formats: CD, digital download	—	14	—	
Everyday People	Released: September 14, 2004; Labels: Word #886317); Formats: CD, digital download	—	19	6	
Sharecropper's Seed, Vol. 1	Released: April 3, 2007; Labels: Word, Curb, Warner Bros. (#8871442); Formats: CD, digital download	—	15	3	
A Dream to Believe In, Vol. 2	Released: July 22, 2008; Labels: Word, Curb, Warner Bros. (#8874412); Formats: CD, digital download	—	16	—	
Captivated	Released: May 3, 2011; Labels: Maranatha! (#20512); Formats: CD, digital download	—	12	—	
Crown Him: Hymns Old and New	Released: October 8, 2013; Labels: Mullenville Media, Entertainment One (#4918805); Formats: CD, digital download	192	6	—	
Like Never Before	Released: January 12, 2018; Labels: Colemanville Media, Entertainment One, Intersound (#168279-27303); Formats: CD, digital download	—	—	—	

=== Live albums ===
List of live albums, with selected chart positions and sales figures
Title	Album details	Peak chart positions		
Title	Album details	US	US Christ.	US Gospel
Live from Cincinnati: Bringin' It Home	Released: October 28, 2003; Labels: Word (#886277); Formats: CD, digital download	—	28	—

=== Compilation albums ===
List of compilation albums, with selected chart positions and sales figures
Title	Album details	Peak chart positions		
Title	Album details	US	US Christ.	US Gospel
Following His Hand: A Ten Year Journey	Released: 2001; Labels: Acts 26, KMG (#8980); Formats: CD	—	—	—
Redeemer: The Best of Nicole C. Mullen	Released: May 9, 2006; Labels: Word (#8865692); Formats: CD, digital download	—	18	4
Nicole C. Mullen Gift Tin	Released: November 4, 2008; Labels: Word (#887762); Formats: CD	—	—	—
The Ultimate Collection	Released: June 2, 2009; Labels: Curb, Word (#8879322); Formats: CD, digital download	185	44	—
Top 10	Released: 2010; Labels: Word (#88098); Formats: CD	—	—	—
Redeemer/Christmas in Black & White	Released: 2011; Labels: Curb, Word (#WD2-888333); Formats: CD	—	—	—

== Awards and honors ==
Mullen was inducted into the Christian Music Hall of Fame in 2011.

=== GMA Dove Awards ===
Year	Category	Work
1998	Song of the Year	"On My Knees" (co-writer)
2001	Song of the Year	"Redeemer" (songwriter)
2001	Songwriter of the Year	
2001	Pop/Contemporary Record of the Year	"Redeemer" (singer/songwriter)
2002	Female Vocalist of the Year	
2002	Short Form Music Video of the Year	"Call on Jesus"
2005	Female Vocalist of the Year	
2005	Urban Album of the Year	Everyday People

=== Grammy Award nominations ===
Year	Category	Work
2002	Best Country Pop/Contemporary Gospel Album	Talk About It
2005	Best Country Pop/Contemporary Gospel Album	Everyday People

== Bibliography ==
- It’s Never Wrong to Do the Right Thing (Esther Press | David C Cook) ISBN 978-0-8307893-5-1
- My Redeemer Lives (COLEMANVILLE MEDIA) ISBN 978-0-5786684-9-9
