= Llegar a Ti =

Llegar A Ti

Studio album by Jaci Velásquez
- Released: August 31, 1999
- Recorded: May – July 1999
- Studio: Crescent Moon Studios; EQ's Recording Studios; Fun Attic Studios (Miami, FL); Gentleman's Club Studios; North Bay Recording Studios (Miami Beach, FL); L.A. East Recording Studios (Salt Lake City, UT)
- Genre: Latin pop; Contemporary Christian; gospel; latin ballad
- Length: 47:43
- Label: Sony Discos
- Producer: Rudy Pérez; Mark Heimermann; Phil Naish; Jorge Alberto Piño · Óscar Llord · Judith Volz (Exec.)

Jaci Velásquez chronology
Jaci Velasquez (1998)	Llegar A Ti (1999)	Crystal Clear (2000)

Llegar a Ti (English: Get to You) is the sixth studio album and debut album made in Spanish recorded by American contemporary Christian music recording artist Jaci Velásquez. This album was released by Sony Discos on August 31, 1999 (see 1999 in music). The album peaked at No. 4 on the Top Latin Albums chart while the title track reached No. 1 on both the Billboard Hot Latin Tracks and Latin Pop Songs charts. It received a nomination for a Grammy Award for Best Latin Pop Album, and the album's lead single, "Llegar a Ti", was nominated at the first Latin Grammy Awards in the category of "Best Female Pop Vocal Performance".

== Track listing ==
1. "Con Tú Amor" (With Your Love) — 04:45
2. "Llegar A Ti" (To Get To You) (Later Adapted In English As "Love Will Find You") — 04:33
3. "Un Lugar Celestial" (A Heavenly Place) (Spanish Version Of: "Un Lugar Celestial") — 04:01
4. "Sólo Tú" (Only You) — 04:04
5. "Manantial De Caritas" (Caresses' Fountain) — 04:17
6. "De Creer En Tí" (Trust In You) (Spanish Version Of: "On My Knees") — 03:48
7. "Junto A Mí" (By My Side) — 04:15
8. "Mira Lo Qué Has Hecho En Mí" (Look What You Have Done In Me) (Spanish Version Of: "Look What Love Has Done") — 04:35
9. "Dentro Está Tú Voz" (Your Voice Is Inside Me) (Spanish Version Of: "Little Voice Inside") — 04:37
10. "Como Una Flor" (Like A Flower) (Spanish Version Of: "Flower In The Rain") — 03:36
11. "Al Mundo, Dios Amó" (God Loved The World) (Spanish Version Of: "God So Loved") — 05:12

== Singles ==
1. "Llegar a ti" (A videoclip was made for this song)
2. "De creer en ti" (A videoclip was made for this song)
3. "Sólo tú"
4. "Un lugar celestial" (A videoclip was made for this song)

== Charts ==
Chart performance for Llegar A Ti
Chart (1999)	Peak position
US Christian Albums (Billboard)	7
US Top Latin Albums (Billboard)	4
US Latin Pop Albums (Billboard)	2

== Sales and certifications ==
Region	Certification	Certified units/sales
United States (RIAA)	2× Platinum (Latin)	200,000^{^}
^{^} Shipments figures based on certification alone.
