= David Mullen (singer) =

American singer, songwriter and producer

David Mullen (born 1964) is a former Blues Pop / CCM singer, songwriter and musician. Later he became well known as a songwriter, music producer, and film score composer. He released his first album in 1989, and won the GMA Dove Award for New Artist of the Year in 1990. He later recorded his last album in 1994. Since then, he has written and produced recordings for several other Christian artists, most notably Nicole C. Mullen.

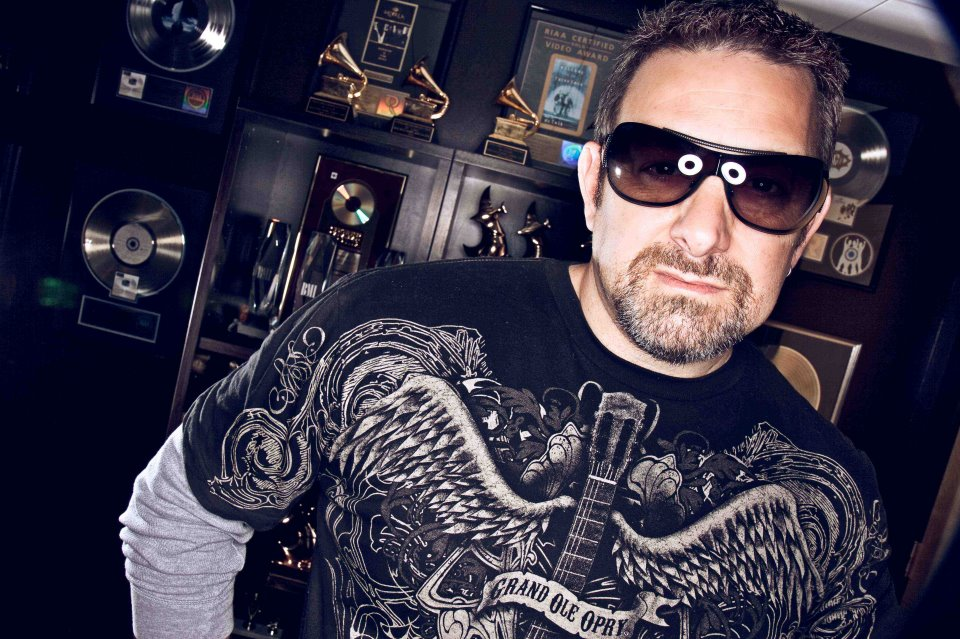
David Mullen in 2011 @Emack Studio

David and Nicole shared the 1998 Dove Award for Song of the Year (along with Michael Ochs) for writing the song "On My Knees" for Jaci Velasquez; Nicole later included the song on her own album. The couple divorced in 2014. He wrote songs to Jonah: A Veggie Tales Movie and made the music for Chris Olsen's Threads: A Pond Full of Pigs. Most recently Mullen has been restoring an old recording studio in the historic district of Franklin, TN (Emack Studio) that he purchased with CCM veteran Toby McKeehan (Toby Mac, DC Talk), and which is now the headquarters of the artist relations department of Yamaha International.

== Overview ==
More recently': "Happy" – Ayiesha Woods, Introducing Ayiesha Woods, 2007 – Peaks at No. 2 "with a bullet" on R&R, (CHR National Airplay Charts) and No. 2 at A/C. "A Dream to Believe In" Nicole C Mullen, 2008 produced and/or wrote the singles. "Redemption" Hetti-More recently: "Happy" – Ayiesha Woods, Introducing Ayiesha Woods, 2007 – Peaks at #2 "with a bullet" on R&R, (CHR National Airplay Charts) and #2 at A/C. "A Dream to Believe In" Nicole C Mullen, 2008 produced and/or wrote the singles. "Redemption" Hetti-Marie (Revolve Tour Worship Leader), 2008-2010, Produced and wrote all singles "Jordan Miller" Jordan Miller, 2009 Produced and wrote record (Revolve Tour Worship Leader),

2008-2010, Produced and wrote "A Dream to Believe In" Nicole C Mullen. "Redemption" Hetti-Marie (Revolve Tour Worship Leader), 2008-2010, Produced and wrote all singles "Jordan Miller" Jordan Miller, 2009 Produced and wrote record

Produced two songs for Trin-i-tee 5:7, which is No. 1 on Billboard's Christian Music Chart, and No. 19 on the Billboard Hot 100. Also Mullen has a TV show in development with All Pro Dad, the fatherhood initiative founded by Coach Tony Dungy.:7 album, which is No. 1 on Billboards Christian Music Chart, and No. 19 on the Billboard Hot 100. Mullen also was in the studio with Nicole C Mullen and fellow producer Ed Cash to executive produce her 1st offering for Maranatha "Captivated". Additionally, he has TV shows and films in development with Revolution Pictures. In February and April 2012, Mullen was nominated for a Grammy and a Dove Award for the production of Trin-i-tee 5:7's Angel & Channele.

In 2012 Mullen became the music supervisor for the American Policy Roundtable's Live radio series The Public Square Special...beginning with Christmas in America. These retrospective musical and literary reviews are reminiscent of Prairie Home Companion, and air quarterly. Additionally, Mullen has gone into pre-production for several TV shows.

== Discography ==
Per AllMusic:

- 1989: Revival (Review: Cornerstone)
- 1991: Faded Blues (Review: Cornerstone)
- 1994: David Mullen

== Accolades ==
Grammy Awards nomination

- Best Pop Gospel Album - 1991, Faded Blues
- Best Song Written for a Motion Picture or for Television- 2000, Larry-Boy: The Soundtrack

Nine-time Dove Award winner

• Best New Artist – 1990 • Best Rock Album – 1992, Faded Blues • Children's Music Album of the Year- 1995, Yo Kidz! 2: The Armor of God • GMA Song of the Year- 1997 "On My Knees" • Children's Music Album of the Year- 1999, Veggie Tunes 2 • Children's Music Album of the Year- 2000, Larry-Boy: The Soundtrack • Song of the Year (Producer)- 2001, "Redeemer"; Nicole C. Mullen; Seat of the Pants Music • Children's Music Album of the Year- 2003, Jonah, A Veggie Tales Movie Original Soundtrack • Urban Album of the Year (Producer)- 2005, Everyday People - Nicole C. Mullen • Best Instrumental Soundtrack of the year (Producer/Writer)- 2007 End of the Spear Motion Picture Soundtrack – Various Artists

Number One singles • "Miracles" - Nicole C. Mullen, Following His Hand: A 10-year Journey, 2003 • "Show Me" - Nicole C. Mullen, Following His Hand: A 10-year Journey, 2003 • "Come Unto Me" - Nicole C. Mullen, Talk About It, 2001 (GOLD) • "Call On Jesus" - Nicole C. Mullen, Talk About It, 2001 (GOLD) • "Redeemer" - Nicole C. Mullen, Nicole C. Mullen, 2001 (GOLD) • "Larry-Boy Theme Song" - Veggie Tales, Larry-Boy: The Soundtrack, 2000 (PLATINUM) • "Shaken" - Rachael Lampa, Live For You, 2000 • "De Creer En Ti" - Jaci Velasquez, Llegar A Ti, 1999 (GOLD) • "Hands Tied" - Becca Jackson. It’ll Sneak Up On You, 1997 • "Tuesday’s Child" - Steven Curtis Chapman, Tuesday’s Child: The Best of Steven Curtis Chapman, 1996 (GOLD) • "Through All The Years" - My Utmost For His Highest: The Covenant, 1996 (PLATINUM) • "We Can Make A Difference" - Jaci Velasquez, Heavenly Place, 1996 • "On My Knees" - Jaci Velasquez, Heavenly Place, 1996 (PLATINUM) • "Take Me Back" - Anointed, Under The Influence, 1996 • "It’s A Matter of Love" - Anointed, The Call, 1995 • "Meant For This Moment" - Carman & Helen Baylor, Yo Kidz! 2: The Armor of God, 1994 (GOLD) • "Somewhere Within The Heart" - Carman & Cindy Morgan, Yo Kidz!, 1994 (GOLD) • "Hero" - David Mullen, David Mullen, 1994 • "The Blood" - David Mullen, Revival, 1990 • "Live So God Can Use You" - David Mullen, Revival, 1990 • "Somebody Say Amen" - David Mullen, Revival, 1990 • "Heavens To Betsy" - David Mullen, Revival, 1990 • "Sho Love You" – David Mullen, Revival, 1990 "Revival" – David Mullen, Revival, 1990

RIAA Awards • 18 Gold or Platinum Awards • Jaci Valasquez A Heavenly Place • LarryBoy the Soundtrack • WOW the 90’s Thirty Greatest Hits • I’ll Lead You Home Michael W Smith • WOW 2007 • Nicole C Mullen • Talk About It- Nicole C Mullen • Change Your World Michael W. Smith • LarryBoy and the Fib From Outerspace • WOW 1996 • WOW 1997 • WOW 1998 • WOW 1999 • WOW 2000 • WOW 2001 • WOW 2002 • WOW 2005
