= Jaci Velasquez =

American singer and actress (born 1979)

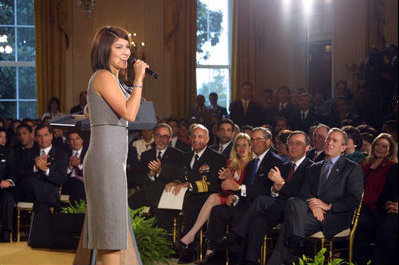
- Velasquez performing at the White House in 2002

Background information
- Born: Jacquelyn Davette Velasquez; October 15, 1979 (age 46); Houston, Texas, U.S.
- Genres: Contemporary Christian, pop, Latin pop
- Occupations: Singer; songwriter; actress; voice actress
- Years active: 1990–present
- Labels: Alta Vista; Briante; Myrrh; Sony Latin; Word; A'postrophe; Inpop; Integrity
- Website: jacivelasquez.com

Jacquelyn Davette "Jaci" Velasquez (/ˈdʒæki/; born October 15, 1979) is an American actress and contemporary Christian and Latin pop singer and songwriter, performing in both English and Spanish.

Velasquez has sold almost three million albums in the US, recorded three Platinum and three Gold albums, and recorded 16 singles that hit No. 1 plus six more that entered the top 10. She received a Latin Billboard Music Award in 2002 for her album Mi Corazón, eight Dove Awards, including Best New Artist and Female Vocalist of the Year, as well as three Grammy nominations, and an American Music Award nomination in the category of "Favorite Latin Artist" in 2002.

From 2010 to 2016, Velasquez co-hosted “The Family-Friendly Morning Show”, a syndicated morning radio program with Doug Griffin.

== Biography ==
=== Early life and early music career ===
Velasquez was born in Houston and is of Mexican, Spanish, Arab, Scottish, French, and Jewish descent. She grew up in an evangelical church where her parents were both singers and pastors. Although she has described herself as a "non-denominational" Christian, she later said in an interview with Morris Cerullo, "you're talking to an Assemblies of God's girl".

At the age of 9, she began traveling with her father, who by that time was a full-time singing evangelist. She began by singing backup and then later sang solo, releasing three independent records between 1988 and 1992: My Favorite Songs, Help Me, and Keep the Fire Burning. It was while on the road that she was discovered by a representative of Myrrh Records.

=== Breakthrough music career ===
16-year-old Velasquez released her breakthrough album Heavenly Place on May 13, 1996; five of its songs became No. 1 hits. The album was later certified platinum. She was distinguished as the fastest selling solo debut recording artist in her genre and the first solo artist in Christian music history to reach gold status with a debut album. Since then she released seven more English-language albums, two of which were certified Gold. Five Latin albums garnishing amazing success with Llegar A Ti going double-platinum and Mi Corazón going platinum. She produced sixteen No. 1 Christian radio hits and six other top-10 singles, and has won nine Dove awards, including New Artist of the Year and two Female Vocalist of the Year wins. Velasquez has also done ad campaigns for Pepsi, Target, Doritos, John Freida's Frizz-Ease hair products, and Helzberg Diamonds.

In 1998, she signed to Sony Discos for a four-album deal and was introduced to Rudy Pérez, who produced her first Spanish-language crossover album Llegar a Ti which topped the Billboard Hot Latin Tracks chart, the first Christian track to top that chart of its kind. This album enabled her to achieve crossover success by building a fan base among Hispanics. Her first single, "Llegar a Ti," topped the Billboard Hot Latin Tracks and became the first Christian song to top that chart. She received a Latin Grammy Award nomination for Best Female Pop Vocal Performance for the song.

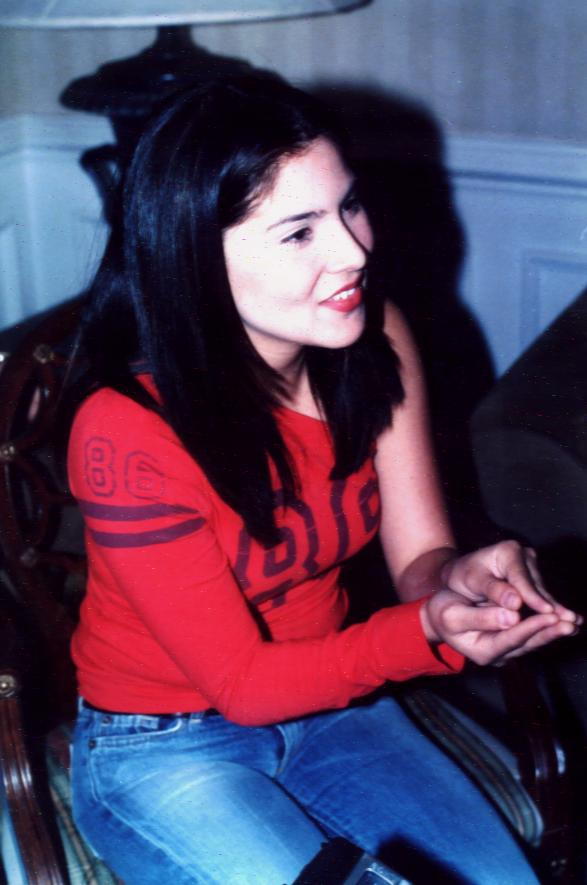
Velasquez in 2001

In 2001, she released her second Spanish-language album, Mi Corazón. The album's lead single, "Como Se Cura Una Herida," topped the Billboard Hot Latin Tracks and became one of the biggest singles of the year, receiving multiple award nominations and wins. The album received a Grammy Award nomination for Best Latin Pop Album. "Como Se Cura Una Herida" charted at No. 1 simultaneously with the song "Adore" at No. 1 on the CCM (Inspirational) chart giving Velasquez two simultaneous No. 1s in two different markets.

Her Latin music credits includes five Spanish-language releases, two No. 1 Latin Billboard Singles, two Platinum albums, a Premio Lo Nuestro Award for New Artist of the Year, two Billboard Latin Music Awards, and four Dove Awards for Spanish Language Album of the Year. In September 2008, she was chosen by the State Department's Bureau of International Information Programs as one of the 15 Prominent Hispanic-Americans in the Arts in America.

In August 2011, Velasquez signed with a new label, Inpop Records, and her album, Diamond, was released on February 7, 2012. She released her first Spanish-language lullaby album, Buenas Noches Mi Sol, in 2012 with Fisher-Price. She released a new project on March 31, 2017, through Integrity Music, consisting of an English-language album, Trust, and the Spanish-language version, Confío. At the 48th Dove Awards, Confío won Spanish Language Album of the Year

=== Acting career ===
Velasquez made her acting debut in the 2003 film Chasing Papi, which also featured Sofia Vergara, Roselyn Sanchez, and Eduardo Verastegui, as well as Nicole Scherzinger in a cameo role. It was released nationwide in the U.S. in April 2003. The movie reached No. 11 at the box office grossing $6 million worldwide. Velasquez also starred in the Christian films The Encounter and Jerusalem Countdown, both released in 2011.

In November 2010, Velasquez began co-hosting the Family Friendly Morning Show with Doug Griffin after being a guest host for several months. The show aired on over 100 U.S. radio stations for four hours each weekday morning. In 2016, she played the drama teacher Mrs. Diaz in I'm Not Ashamed, a 2016 biographical drama film which is based on the journals of Rachel Joy Scott.

== Personal life ==
Velasquez married Darren Potuck, of the band AutoVaughn, on August 16, 2003. They were divorced in 2005.

On December 17, 2006, she married Nic Gonzales in a private ceremony in Austin, Texas. Gonzales is a member of Salvador, a Christian group with whom she had been touring. Their first son Zealand was born in 2007 and their second son Soren in 2009.

Velasquez and her husband were featured in an episode of the home remodeling reality TV show Renovation Realities which aired December 6, 2014, on the DIY Network.

Jaci is a vegan.

== Discography ==
- My Favorite Songs (1988)
- Help Me (1992)
- Keep the Fire Burning (1994)
- Heavenly Place (1996)
- Jaci Velasquez (1998)
- Llegar A Ti (1999)
- Crystal Clear (2000)
- Mi Corazón (2001)
- Christmas/Navidad (2001)
- Unspoken (2003)
- Milagro (2003)
- Beauty Has Grace (2005)
- Love Out Loud (2008)
- Diamond (2012)
- Buenas Noches Mi Sol (2012)
- Trust/Confío (2017)

== Filmography ==
- 2003: Chasing Papi
- 2004: Doc (one episode)
- 2003: Los Reyes Magos (The 3 Wise Men)
- 2011: The Encounter
- 2011: Jerusalem Countdown
- 2014: Rumors of Wars
- 2015: VeggieTales: Noah's Ark
- 2016: I'm Not Ashamed
- 2017: A Question of Faith
- 2020: Cover Me
- 2020: Acquitted by Faith

== Bibliography ==
- 1996: A Heavenly Place (over 10,000 units sold)
- 2003: Los Evangelios Toman Vida: The Gospels Come to Life
- 2012: Coffee and Concealer

== Awards ==
Latin Grammy Award Nominations

- 2000 Best Female Pop Vocal Performance Llegar A Ti
- 2004 Best Female Pop Vocal Album Milagro.
- 2017 Best Christian Album Confío.

Dove Awards

- 1997 New Artist of the Year
- 1998 Song of the Year, "On My Knees"
- 1999 Female Vocalist of the Year
- 2000 Special Event Album of the Year, "Streams"
- 2000 Spanish-language Album of the Year, "Llegar a Ti"
- 2000 Female Vocalist of the Year
- 2002 Spanish-Language Album of the Year "Mi Corazon"
- 2003 Spanish-Language Album of the Year "Navidad"
- 2017 Spanish-Language Album of the Year "Confio"

American Music Awards Nominations

- 2002 Favorite Latin Artist

Billboard Latin Music Awards

- 2002 Female Pop Album: "Mi Corazon

Premio Lo Nuestro

- 2000 for New Artist of the Year

Premios Arpa

- 2018 Best Female Vocal Album of the Year "Confio"
