= Jars of Clay discography =

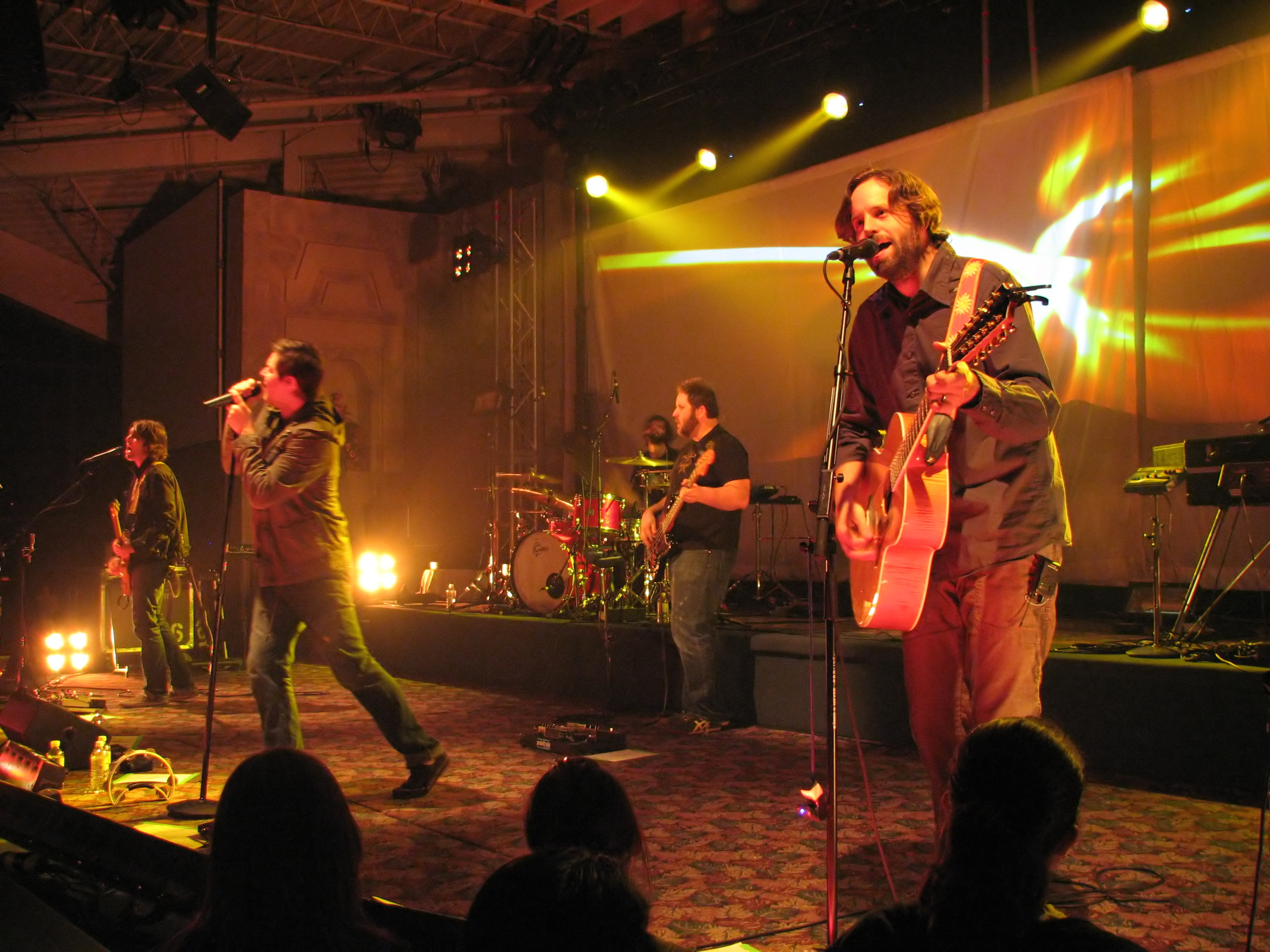
- March 2007; Toronto, Canada
- Studio albums: 11
- Extended plays: 16
- Compilation albums: 3
- Singles: 44
- Video albums: 1

The discography of Jars of Clay, a multi-stylistic American rock and Christian band from Nashville, Tennessee consists of 11 studio albums, 44 singles, 16 extended plays, three compilation albums, a part-studio, part-live double-album, a live DVD, and several releases of other types. While Jars of Clay has never released a major, full-length live album strictly speaking, the second disc of the part-studio, part-live double-album, Furthermore (2003), fulfills the same expectation. In addition, the band has released Live Monsters (2007), a live EP of performances from the tour following the release of Good Monsters (2006), and five more EPs of live performances in smaller, more intimate settings.

Jars of Clay's self-titled debut album (1995) was released on Essential Records as well as on Essential's parent label, Silvertone. The album hit No. 1 on the Billboard Top Christian albums for a total of 22 weeks in 1996. It reached No. 1 on the Billboard Heatseekers chart and stayed on the Billboard 200 for a total of 66 weeks, peaking at No. 46. Its first single, "Flood" reached No. 12 on the Billboard Modern Rock Tracks, No. 37 on the Billboard Hot 100 and No. 1 one on the CCM Rock chart. The single's performance made Jars of Clay an overnight success in both the mainstream and Christian radio markets. The debut album was certified platinum by RIAA having sold more than 1 million copies just one year following its release. It was certified 2× platinum in 1999. Two other singles from the album also hit No. 1 on the CCM charts, "Love Song for a Savior" and "Liquid". The album was followed by a successful holiday single, "Drummer Boy", from the 1995 EP Drummer Boy, which reached No. 3 on the Billboard Heatseekers chart.

Between the debut of their self-titled album and their final project with Essential, Greatest Hits (2008), Jars of Clay would release six more studio albums, two major hits albums and the part-studio, part-live album Furthermore: From the Studio, From the Stage (2003). All (except the hits albums) would peak on the Billboard Top Christian Albums charts within the top five positions with If I Left the Zoo (1999) and Redemption Songs (2005) each spending one week at No. 1. The band's sophomore release, Much Afraid (1997) reached No. 2 on the Top Christian Albums charts, but would become the band's highest-charting album on the Billboard 200, reaching the No. 8 spot. Much Afraid was certified platinum by the RIAA in 2000. If I Left the Zoo and Furthermore were certified gold in 2000 and 2005 respectively. Much Afraid, If I Left the Zoo, and The Eleventh Hour (2002), (their second, third, and fourth albums, respectively), each earned a Grammy Award for Best Pop/Contemporary Gospel Album.

After their tenure with Essential ended in 2007, Jars of Clay created their own record label, Gray Matters, on which they released five more albums. Christmas Songs (2008) became their first independent release. The Long Fall Back to Earth (2009) followed, reaching No. 1 on the Top Christian Albums chart and earned the band their eighth Grammy nomination. The Tucker Martine-produced Inland (2013), the band's fourth independent release and eleventh studio album overall, reached No. 2 on the Top Christian Albums charts.

Other notable albums include the Grammy-nominated Who We Are Instead (2003), an intimate exploration of the band's Nashville roots in folk and rural Americana, and Good Monsters (2006), the critically acclaimed release that the band described as their "first ever rock record." Good Monsters was named "Album of the Year" by CCM Magazine in its September 2006 issue, praising it as "the most profound album the Christian music community has released in years." In addition to their Grammys, the band earned three GMA Dove Awards for a best album category for The Eleventh Hour, Good Monsters, and The Long Fall Back to Earth.

Jars of Clay has also released video of most of their live recordings, notably 11Live: Jars of Clay in Concert (2002) on DVD and VHS, and digital video released with the four-volume EP series, Live at Gray Matters (2010–11), among other, more limited releases of live video performances.

== Albums ==
=== Studio albums ===
List of studio albums, with chart positions and certifications
Title	Details	Peak chart positions						Certifications
Title	Details	US	US Christ.	US Rock	US Alt.	US Heat.	US Hol.	Certifications
Jars of Clay	Release date: October 24, 1995; Formats: CD, CS, digital, LP; Label: Essential, Silvertone	46	1	—	—	1	—	RIAA: 2× Platinum; MC: Gold
Much Afraid	Release date: September 16, 1997; Formats: CD, CS, digital, LP; Label: Essential, Silvertone	8	2	—	—	—	—	RIAA: Platinum
If I Left the Zoo	Release date: November 9, 1999; Formats: CD, CS, digital, LP; Label: Essential, Silvertone	44	1	—	—	—	—	RIAA: Gold
The Eleventh Hour	Release date: March 5, 2002; Formats: CD, CS, digital; Label: Essential, Silvertone	28	3	—	—	—	—	
Who We Are Instead	Release date: November 4, 2003; Formats: CD, digital; Label: Essential, Silvertone	103	4	—	—	—	—	
Redemption Songs	Release date: March 22, 2005; Formats: CD, digital; Label: Essential, Silvertone	71	1	—	—	—	—	
Good Monsters	Release date: September 5, 2006; Formats: CD, digital; Label: Essential	58	3	20	—	—	—	
Christmas Songs	Release date: October 16, 2007; Formats: CD, digital, LP; Label: Gray Matters, Nettwerk	130	7	—	—	—	11	
The Long Fall Back to Earth	Release date: April 21, 2009; Formats: CD, digital, LP; Label: Gray Matters, Essential	29	1	—	—	—	—	
Jars of Clay Presents: The Shelter	Release date: October 5, 2010; Formats: CD, digital; Label: Gray Matters	78	5	25	13	—	—	
Inland	Release date: August 27, 2013; Formats: CD, digital, LP; Label: Gray Matters	70	2	20	11	—	—	
"—" denotes releases that did not chart.

=== Part-studio, part-live albums ===
List of part-studio, part-live albums, with chart positions and certifications
Title	Details	Peak chart positions		Certifications
Title	Details	US	US Christ.	Certifications
Furthermore: From the Studio, from the Stage	Release date: February 4, 2003; Formats: CD, digital; Label: Essential/Silvertone	64	3	RIAA: Gold

=== Compilation albums ===
List of compilation albums, with chart positions
Title	Details	Peak chart positions
Title	Details	US Christ.
The Essential Jars of Clay	Release date: September 4, 2007; Formats: CD, digital; Label: Essential/Legacy	—
Greatest Hits	Release date: April 1, 2008; Formats: CD, digital; Label: Essential	22
20	Release date: August 19, 2014; Formats: CD, digital; Label: Gray Matters	28
"—" denotes releases that did not chart.

=== Extended plays ===
List of extended plays, with chart positions
Title	Details	Peak chart positions				
Title	Details	US Christ.	US	US Hol.	US Cat.	US Heat.
Drummer Boy	Released: November 22, 1995; November 22, 1997; Formats: 12", CD, CS, digital; Label: Essential (1995)/Silvertone (1997)	5	101	19	32	3
Roots & Wings EP	Released: March 1, 2005; Formats: Digital; Label: Essential	—	—	—	—	—
Mini Monsters EP	Released: August 8, 2006; Formats: Digital; Label: Essential	—	—	—	—	—
Live Monsters	Released: September 4, 2007 (Note: Prior to its retail release, another version of Live Monsters was available only at shows and has a different track listing.); Formats: CD, digital; Label: Essential	—	—	—	—	—
Closer EP	Released: July 29, 2008; Formats: CD, digital; Label: Essential/Gray Matters/Nettwerk	44	—	—	—	—
Live at Gray Matters, Vol. 1: Songs from The Long Fall Back to Earth	Released: February 2, 2010; Formats: Digital/digital video; Label: Gray Matters	—	—	—	—	—
Flood(ed): A Benefit	Released: March 11, 2010 (Note: Three of Jars of Clay's EPs did not have retail releases, but where given limited releases online for benefit causes. Flood(ed) was released to benefit those affected by flooding in Nashville (May 1–2, 2010).); Formats: Digital; Label: Provident Label Group	–	—	–	—	—
Live at Gray Matters, Vol. 2: The Rewind Edition	Released: July 27, 2010; Formats: Digital/digital video; Label: Gray Matters	—	—	—	—	—
Live at Gray Matters, Vol. 3: The Christmas Edition	Released: November 16, 2010; Formats: Digital/digital video; Label: Gray Matters	—	—	—	—	–
Live at Gray Matters, Vol. 4: One Mic	Released: March 29, 2011; Formats: Digital/digital video; Label: Gray Matters	—	—	—	—	–
More Christmas Songs EP	Released: October 27, 2011; Formats: CD, digital; Label: Gray Matters	—	—	—	—	—
Reinvent, Remember, Replay	Released: November 28, 2011; Formats: CD, digital; Label: Gray Matters	—	—	—	—	—
Under the Weather (Live in Sellersville, PA)	Released: March 19, 2013; Formats: Digital; Label: Gray Matters	—	—	—	—	—
NoiseTrade Eastside Manor Sessions	Released: July 25, 2013 (Note: Three of Jars of Clay's EPs did not have retail releases, but where given limited releases online for benefit causes. The Eastside Manor Sessions were released on NoiseTrade, a direct-to-fan distribution platform created to help benefit recording artists.); Formats: Digital; Label: Not on label	—	—	—	—	—
The Others EP	Released: January 9, 2015 (Note: Three of Jars of Clay's EPs did not have retail releases, but where given limited releases online for benefit causes. The Others EP was released for the Rallysong campaign to benefit the Blood: Water Mission.); Formats: Digital; Label: Not on label	—	—	—	—	—
"—" denotes releases that did not chart.

=== Other albums ===
List of other albums, with descriptions
Title	Details
Frail	Released: July 5, 1994; Formats: CD; Label: Independent; Description: Independently released demo album containing tracks later re-recorded for their first two studio albums
Stringtown	Released: January 25, 1999; Formats: CD/CD-ROM; Label: Essential; Description: Live album originally released to Fan Club members, including a CD-ROM featuring tour multimedia and music videos
Front Yard Luge	Released: September 2, 1999; Formats: CD; Label: TN2 Entertainment; Description: Live mini-album available with pre-order of If I Left the Zoo from select retailers
The White Elephant Sessions	Released: March 26, 2000; Formats: CD; Label: Essential; Description: Limited full-length release featuring demos and other rarities packaged with copies of If I Left the Zoo
Jar of Gems	Released: September 25, 2001; Formats: CD; Label: Essential/Zomba; Description: Released only in Singapore and the Philippines, a compilation of early hits
iTunes Originals – Jars of Clay	Released: November 8, 2005; Formats: Digital; Label: Provident Label Group; Description: Exclusive to iTunes Store, part of the iTunes Originals series featuring the work and history of recording artists
Gather and Build: A Collection	Released: October 25, 2011; Formats: Digital; Label: Gray Matters; Description: A compilation available on NoiseTrade also featuring tracks previously unreleased
Daytrotter Presents: Jars of Clay	Released: December 13, 2013; Formats: Digital, LP; Label: Daytrotter; Description: A seven-track mini-album featuring studio sessions of songs from the album Inland (Note: The LP is shared with another Daytrotter Session from the band Superdrag, under the title Daytrotter Presents No. 25. Rather than the seven tracks featured on the digital mini-album, the A-side features four tracks from Jars of Clay while the B-side features four tracks from Superdrag.)
Inlandia: The Remix Collection	Released: March 4, 2014; Formats: CD, digital; Label: Gray Matters; Description: A seven-track mini-album featuring remixes of songs from the album Inland
A Jars of Clay in-studio Performance of the "Much Afraid" Album	Released: March 2021; Formats: Digital, LP; Label: Gray Matters; Description: Limited vinyl release of a livestreamed benefit concert during the COVID-19 pandemic featuring a fan-selected album
Live in Manila	Released: September 14, 2021; Formats: LP/DVD; Label: Gray Matters

=== Special editions ===
List of special editions of albums and extended plays, with descriptions
Title	Details
Jars of Clay Interactive	Released: October 25, 1995; Formats: CD-ROM; Label: Essential; Description: Features behind-the-scenes photography, the "Flood" music video, and audio from the independent release Frail
Jars of Clay Platinum	Released: December 8, 1996; Formats: CD; Label: Essential/Silvertone; Description: Limited double-disc release of the self-titled debut album released to commemorate RIAA Platinum status
Much Afraid Exclusive Seatbelt Tuba Edition	Released: September 16, 1997; Formats: CD; Label: Essential; Description: Limited release available by pre-order through Family Christian Bookstores featuring a three-track bonus disc—Seatbelt Tuba: The Acoustic Sessions
Who We Are Instead (Special Edition)	Released: November 4, 2003; Formats: CD; Label: Essential
Christmas Songs USB	Released: November 29, 2007; Formats: USB thumb drive/digital; Label: Gray Matters
The Long Fall Back to Earth Deluxe Edition (2009)	Released: April 21, 2009; Formats: Digital; Label: Essential
Under the Weather with Jars of Clay Deluxe Edition	Released: March 19, 2013; Formats: Digital/digital video; Label: Gray Matters
The Long Fall Back to Earth Deluxe Edition (2015)	Released: October 23, 2015; Formats: CD/DVD, digital; Label: Essential

== Singles ==
Title	Year	Peak chart positions												Album
Title	Year	US	US AAA	US Alt	US Pop	US Adult	US Main.	US Radio	US Christ	US Christ CHR	US Christ AC	US Christ Rock	CAN	Album
"Flood"	1995	37	4	12	20	29	16	32	—	4	—	1	3	Jars of Clay
"Love Song for a Savior"	1995	—	—	—	—	—	—	—	—	1	19	—	—	Jars of Clay
"Like a Child"	1995	—	—	—	—	—	—	—	—	2	29	—	—	Jars of Clay
"Liquid"	1996	—	—	—	—	—	—	—	—	1	—	4	—	Jars of Clay
"Worlds Apart"	1996	—	—	—	—	—	—	—	—	—	13	—	—	Jars of Clay
"Blind"	1996	—	—	—	—	—	—	—	—	3	—	—	—	Jars of Clay
"Crazy Times"	1997	—	—	38	—	—	—	—	—	1	35	2	—	Much Afraid
"Five Candles (You Were There)"	1998	—	—	—	—	—	—	—	—	1	17	—	—	Much Afraid
"Truce"	1998	—	—	—	—	—	—	—	—	—	—	1	—	Much Afraid
"Fade to Grey"	1998	—	—	—	—	—	—	—	—	1	37	6	—	Much Afraid
"Overjoyed"	1998	—	—	—	—	—	—	—	—	1	32	6	—	Much Afraid
"Needful Hands"	1998	—	—	—	—	—	—	—	—	4	1	—	—	Exodus
"Everything in Between"	1999	—	—	—	—	—	—	—	—	4	—	13	—	The Prince of Egypt: Inspirational Soundtrack
"Unforgetful You"	1999	—	—	—	—	40	—	—	—	1	—	3	—	If I Left the Zoo
"Hand"	1999	—	—	—	—	—	—	—	—	—	9	—	—	If I Left the Zoo
"Collide"	2000	—	—	—	—	—	—	—	—	1	—	9	—	If I Left the Zoo
"No One Loves Me Like You"	2000	—	—	—	—	—	—	—	—	—	—	—	—	If I Left the Zoo
"I'm Alright"	2000	—	—	—	—	—	—	—	—	2	—	—	—	If I Left the Zoo
"Can't Erase It"	2001	—	—	—	—	—	—	—	—	6	—	9	—	If I Left the Zoo
"The Stone"	2001	—	—	—	—	—	—	—	—	—	—	—	—	City on a Hill: Songs of Worship and Praise
"This Road"	2001	—	—	—	—	—	—	—	—	—	—	—	—	City on a Hill: Songs of Worship and Praise
"I Need You"	2001	—	—	—	—	—	—	—	—	1	—	8	—	The Eleventh Hour
"Fly"	2001	—	—	—	—	—	—	—	—	1	3	—	—	The Eleventh Hour
"Revolution"	2002	—	—	—	—	—	—	—	—	3	—	4	—	The Eleventh Hour
"Whatever She Wants"	2002	—	—	—	—	—	—	—	—	—	—	11	—	The Eleventh Hour
"The Valley Song (Sing of Your Mercy)"	2002	—	—	—	—	—	—	—	10	29	8	—	—	Furthermore: From the Studio, From the Stage
"Show You Love"	2003	—	—	—	—	—	—	—	6	1	5	—	—	Who We Are Instead
"Sunny Days"	2004	—	—	—	—	—	—	—	29	—	30	—	—	Who We Are Instead
"God Will Lift Up Your Head"	2005	—	—	—	—	—	—	—	11	—	17	—	—	Redemption Songs
"I'll Fly Away"	2005	—	—	—	—	—	—	—	—	—	—	—	—	Redemption Songs
"Waiting for the World to Fall"	2005	—	—	—	—	—	—	—	—	—	—	—	—	Music Inspired by the Chronicles of Narnia: The Lion, the Witch, and the Wardrobe
"Dead Man (Carry Me)"	2006	—	—	—	—	—	—	—	14	—	20	—	—	Good Monsters
"Work"	2006	—	—	—	—	—	—	—	27	4	—	—	—	Good Monsters
"There Is a River"	2007	—	—	—	—	—	—	—	22	—	17	—	—	Good Monsters
"Love Came Down at Christmas"	2007	—	—	—	—	—	—	—	12	—	13	—	—	Christmas Songs
"Wonderful Christmastime"	2007	—	—	—	—	—	—	—	23	—	17	—	—	Christmas Songs
"Closer"	2008	—	—	—	—	—	—	—	—	—	—	—	—	Closer EP
"Two Hands"	2009	—	—	—	—	—	—	—	6	18	8	—	—	The Long Fall Back to Earth
"Heaven"	2009	—	—	—	—	—	—	—	—	14	—	—	—	The Long Fall Back to Earth
"Out of My Hands" (featuring Mike Donehey)	2010	—	—	—	—	—	—	—	27	—	27	—	—	The Shelter
"Shelter" (featuring Brandon Heath)	2011	—	—	—	—	—	—	—	32	29	—	—	—	The Shelter
"It Came Upon the Midnight Clear"	2011	—	—	—	—	—	—	—	41	—	—	—	—	non-album single
"After the Fight"	2013	—	—	—	—	—	—	—	—	—	—	—	—	Inland
"Inland"	2013	—	—	—	—	—	—	—	—	—	—	—	—	Inland
"—" denotes a recording that did not chart.

== Contributions ==
List of contributions to a compilation, soundtrack, or other project, with description
Song	Year	Album	Description
"Rose Colored Stained Glass Windows"	1996	Never Say Dinosaur	Cover of Petra song by the same name for tribute album
"The Chair"	1996	The Long Kiss Goodnight Soundtrack	Originally intended to cover David Bowie's "Heroes", but abandoned the recording sessions and instead wrote their own song
"Needful Hands"	1998	Exodus	Acoustic version of the song appears on Furthermore: From the Studio, From the Stage
"Everything in Between"	1998	The Prince of Egypt: Inspirational Soundtrack	
"If I Stand"	1998	Awesome God: A Tribute to Rich Mullins	Cover of Rich Mullins song by the same name
"Wicker Baskets"	1999	Sounds of Wood & Steel 2	Instrumental track; also included on the 1997 Silvertone release of Drummer Boy
"Headstrong"	2000	Roaring Lambs	Outtake from the If I Left the Zoo recording sessions; the original demo version of this song can be found on The White Elephant Sessions
"The Stone"	2000	City on a Hill: Songs of Worship and Praise	
"This Road"	2000	City on a Hill: Songs of Worship and Praise	
"The Comforter Has Come"	2001	Re:Newal – The Art of Community	A different version was later released on City on a Hill: Sing Alleluia
"Bethlehem Town"	2002	City on a Hill: It's Christmas Time	One of the songs that the band recorded for their then-shelved Christmas album
"The Widowing Field"	2002	We Were Soldiers Soundtrack	Now available on "The Essential - Jars of Clay"
"Come Thou Fount of Every Blessing"	2003	City on a Hill: The Gathering	
"Jesse's Song"	2003	Sounds of Wood & Steel 3	Instrumental track
"Be Thou My Vision"	2003	WOW Worship: Yellow	
"All I Want Is You"	2004	In the Name of Love: Artists United for Africa	Cover of U2 song by the same name
"I'll Fly Away"	2004	WOW Worship: Red	Different recording than the version that appears on Redemption Songs
"Christmas for Cowboys"	2004	Maybe This Christmas Tree	Cover of John Denver song by the same name
"Please Daddy (Don't Get Drunk This Christmas)"	2005	Reel to Reel V.2.9 The Holidays (promo only)	Cover of John Denver song by the same name. This song has never been commercially available.
"Waiting for the World to Fall"	2005	Music Inspired by the Chronicles of Narnia: The Lion, the Witch, and the Wardrobe	
"It Came Upon a Midnight Clear"	2005	Come, Let Us Adore Him	
"Drive"	2006	Reel to Reel V.3.5 Nettwerk Covers (promo only)	Cover of The Cars song by the same name. This song has never been commercially available.
"I Love My Triangle"	2007	Come On Over! Volume 2	Children's music
"When You're with the Band"	2007	Come On Over! Volume 2	Children's music
"Body and Wine"	2010	Artists United for International Justice Mission - Freedom	B-side from Good Monsters
"Run"	2013	Come Back Home	From a multi-artist release to benefit Courage House
"Land of My Sojourn"	2014	Ragamuffin: Music Inspired by the Motion Picture	Rich Mullins cover
"Broken Places"	2022	There's a Rainbow Somewhere	Randy Stonehill tribute – crowdfunded album

== DVDs ==
List of DVD releases, (for CD/DVD two-disc releases, see Albums: Special editions)
Title	Details
11Live: Jars of Clay in Concert	Released: September 24, 2002; Formats: DVD, VHS; Label: Essential

== Collaborations ==
List of collaboration albums, with chart positions and certifications
Title	Details	Peak chart positions			Certifications
Title	Details	US	US Christ.	US Holiday	Certifications
A Family Christmas (with SHEL)	Release date: November 22, 2019; Formats: CD, LP, digital download; Label: Tone Tree Music	—	—	—	
"—" denotes releases that did not chart.
