= Greatest Hits (Jars of Clay album) =

2008 compilation album by Jars of Clay

Greatest hits album by Jars of Clay
- Released: April 1, 2008
- Recorded: 1995–2007
- Genre: Pop rock
- Label: Essential
- Producer: Various

Jars of Clay chronology
Christmas Songs (2007)	Greatest Hits (2008)	Closer EP (2008)

Professional ratings
Review scores
Source	Rating
Christianity Today	3/5 stars
Cross Rhythms	7/10 stars

Greatest Hits is the third compilation/greatest hits album from Jars of Clay, that was released on April 1, 2008. This compilation follows 2001's Jar of Gems, which was released to the Singapore market, and 2007's The Essential Jars of Clay.

The album contains 14 tracks, 13 previously released and one new song, entitled "Love Is the Protest".

== Track listing ==
All tracks are written by Jars of Clay (Dan Haseltine, Charlie Lowell, Stephen Mason, and Matt Odmark), except where noted.

No.	Title	Writer(s)	Originally from	Length
1.	"Flood"		Jars of Clay (1995)	3:31
2.	"Love Song for a Savior"	Haseltine, Lowell, Mason, Matt Bronleewe	Jars of Clay	4:46
3.	"Like a Child"	Haseltine, Lowell, Mason, Bronleewe	Jars of Clay	4:35
4.	"Worlds Apart"		Jars of Clay	5:18
5.	"Crazy Times"		Much Afraid (1997)	3:34
6.	"Frail"		Much Afraid	6:56
7.	"Unforgetful You"		If I Left the Zoo (1999)	3:20
8.	"I Need You"		The Eleventh Hour (2002)	3:38
9.	"Show You Love"		Who We Are Instead (2003)	3:32
10.	"Amazing Grace" (featuring Ashley Cleveland)		Who We Are Instead	5:18
11.	"God Will Lift Up Your Head"		Redemption Songs (2005)	4:22
12.	"Dead Man (Carry Me)"		Good Monsters (2006)	3:20
13.	"Work"		Good Monsters	3:55
14.	"Love Is the Protest"		Previously unreleased	3:33
