= Live at Gray Matters =

Live at Gray Matters is a series of digital-only EP releases by Christian rock act Jars of Clay. The premise of the series is for each release to have a theme and each contain around 4–5 tracks. The songs featured on the EPs were recorded in an informal setting at the band's own record label, Gray Matters, and contains little to no editing of the tracks. A video accompanies each EP that shows the band performing the tracks. The cover of each recording features an identical photograph, varying only in background color.

== Vol. 1: Songs from The Long Fall Back to Earth ==
Live at Gray Matters, Vol. 1

EP by Jars of Clay
- Released: February 2, 2010
- Recorded: 2009–2010
- Genre: Acoustic rock
- Length: 23:56
- Label: Gray Matters/Nettwerk
- Producer: Jars of Clay

Jars of Clay chronology
Closer EP (2008)	Live at Gray Matters, Vol. 1 (2010)	Live at Gray Matters, Vol. 2 (2010)

Volume 1 of the series features five cuts from the band's 2009 release The Long Fall Back to Earth, including the lead single "Two Hands". The songs "The Long Fall" and "Weapons" have typically been performed together as one song in concerts and are featured that way here on the EP.

=== Track listing ===
1. "Don't Stop" – 3:37
2. "Heart" – 5:26
3. "The Long Fall/Weapons" – 6:31
4. "Safe to Land" – 4:41
5. "Two Hands" – 4:21
6. Video: Live at Gray Matters – 24:49

== Vol. 2: The Rewind Edition ==
Live at Gray Matters, Vol. 2

EP by Jars of Clay
- Released: July 27, 2010
- Recorded: 2010
- Genre: Acoustic rock
- Length: 19:26
- Label: Gray Matters/Nettwerk
- Producer: Jars of Clay

Jars of Clay chronology
Live at Gray Matters, Vol. 1 (2010)	Live at Gray Matters, Vol. 2 (2010)	Live at Gray Matters, Vol. 3 (2010)

Volume 2 of the series features five tracks off the band's self-titled debut album, including a rare performance of "Boy On a String", a song typically not featured in the band's concert setlists.

=== Track listing ===
1. "Liquid" – 3:32
2. "Boy On a String" – 3:29
3. "Like a Child" – 4:41
4. "Flood" – 3:36
5. "Love Song for a Savior" – 4:48
6. Video: Live at Gray Matters – 23:52

== Vol. 3: The Christmas Edition ==
Live at Gray Matters, Vol. 3

EP by Jars of Clay
- Released: November 16, 2010
- Recorded: 2010
- Genre: Acoustic rock, Christmas music
- Length: 13:25
- Label: Gray Matters/Nettwerk
- Producer: Jars of Clay

Jars of Clay chronology
Live at Gray Matters, Vol. 2 (2010)	Live at Gray Matters, Vol. 3 (2010)	Live at Gray Matters, Vol. 4 (2011)

Volume 3 of the series features a handful of highlights off the band's Christmas Songs project. "Drummer Boy" and "God Rest Ye Merry Gentlemen" are two long-time Christmas favorites of the band, first making an appearance in 1995 on the Drummer Boy EP.

=== Track listing ===
1. "God Rest Ye Merry Gentlemen" – 3:48
2. "Love Came Down at Christmas" – 2:46
3. "Drummer Boy" – 4:18
4. "Hibernation Day" – 3:13
5. Video: Live at Gray Matters – 13:59

== Vol. 4: One Mic ==
Live at Gray Matters, Vol. 4

EP by Jars of Clay
- Released: March 29, 2011
- Recorded: 2011
- Genre: Acoustic rock
- Length: 19:01
- Label: Gray Matters/Nettwerk
- Producer: Jars of Clay

Jars of Clay chronology
Live at Gray Matters, Vol. 3 (2010)	Live at Gray Matters, Vol. 4 (2011)

=== Track listing ===
1. "Worlds Apart" – 5:38
2. "Boys" – 4:29
3. "I Need Thee Every Hour" – 3:50
4. "Headphones" – 5:04
5. Video: Live at Gray Matters – 19:10
