= Christmas Songs (Jars of Clay album) =

Studio album by Jars of Clay
- Released: October 16, 2007
- Recorded: 2007
- Genre: Christmas music
- Length: 49:26
- Label: Gray Matters/Nettwerk
- Producer: Jars of Clay

Jars of Clay chronology
The Essential Jars of Clay (2007)	Christmas Songs (2007)	Greatest Hits (2008)

Singles from Christmas Songs
- 1. "Love Came Down at Christmas" Released: November 2007 (AC Single); 2. "Wonderful Christmastime" Released: November 2007 (CHR/Pop Single); 3. "Peace Is Here" Released: December 2007 (AC Single)

Professional ratings
Review scores
Source	Rating
AllMusic	4/5 stars
Christianity Today	3.5/5 stars
Cross Rhythms	8/10 stars
Jesus Freak Hideout	5/5 stars
Paste	3.5/5 stars

Christmas Songs is the eighth studio album and first Christmas album by Jars of Clay, that was released on October 16, 2007, through Gray Matters/Nettwerk. This is the first ever release from the band through their newly created Gray Matters imprint via Nettwerk Music Group.

== Background ==
In 2006, Jars of Clay began to seek a new recording contract as their then-current contract with Sony BMG's Christian sub-label Essential Records was due to end a few releases later. The group then decided to create their own label named Gray Matters and formed a partnership with the label and imprint label Nettwerk. The group decided to record their first full length Christmas album to debut on this label. The group previously has released one Christmas EP named Drummer Boy, which contained the classic Christmas carol "The Little Drummer Boy". The group also contributed their original Christmas song "Bethlehem Town" to the Christmas edition of the City on a Hill series. In 2004, Jars appeared on the collection entitled Maybe This Christmas Tree with their lighter "Christmas for Cowboys" alongside artists such as Lisa Loeb, Ivy and Copeland. More recently, in 2005, Jars returned to the Christmas classics to cover "It Came Upon a Midnight Clear" on the collection Come Let Us Adore Him: A Christmas Worship Experience.

In 2007 as the contract with Sony BMG ended, the group began recording Christmas Songs, selecting a range of established and well known Christmas Carols, some lesser known songs and some original songs to present for this project. The album was recorded in one-take recording sessions, a recording method only used once before by the band, in their prior studio album Good Monsters. This recording method meant that the majority of the time spent on the album was spent in pre-production, arranging the songs, practicing the songs before entering the studio to record them.

== Track listing ==
No.	Title	Songwriting Credits	Length
1.	"The Gift of St. Cecilia"	Jars of Clay	1:21
2.	"Wonderful Christmastime"	Paul McCartney	3:37
3.	"Love Came Down at Christmas"	Words by Christina Rossetti; Music by Garton, traditional Irish Melody; Arrangement by Jars of Clay	3:02
4.	"O Little Town of Bethlehem"	Words by Phillips Brooks; Music arrangement by Byron Keith and Jars of Clay	4:41
5.	"Hibernation Day"	Jars of Clay, Jeremy Lutito, Gabe Ruschival	2:59
6.	"Winter Skin"	Jars of Clay	2:59
7.	"Peace Is Here"	Jars of Clay	4:09
8.	"God Rest Ye Merry Gentlemen"	Traditional; Arrangement by Jars of Clay	3:44
9.	"Evergreen"	Jars of Clay	2:44
10.	"Christmastime Is Here"	Words by Lee Mendelson; Music by Vince Guaraldi	3:21
11.	"Drummer Boy"	Katherine K. Davis, Henry Onorati, Harry Simeone	4:35
12.	"Gabriel's Message"	Words paraphrased by Sabine Baring-Gould; Music traditional Basque Carol; Arrangement by Edgar Pettman	2:07
13.	"In the Bleak Midwinter"	Words by Christina Rossetti and Jars of Clay; Music by Cranham, Gustav Holst; Arrangement by Jars of Clay	4:36
14.	"I Heard the Bells on Christmas Day"	Words by Henry Longfellow; Music by John B. Calkin	5:31
Total length:			49:26

iTunes bonus track
No.	Title	Songwriting Credits	Length
15.	"Peace Is Here" (Acoustic Version)	Jars of Clay	2:58

eMusic bonus track
No.	Title	Songwriting Credits	Length
15.	"God Rest Ye Merry Gentlemen" (Acoustic Version)	Traditional; Arrangement by Jars of Clay	3:47

== USB Stick Version ==
Christmas Songs was also released via USB stick format. The flash drive is reusable and has a capacity of 512 MB. The USB sticks were initially only available for purchase at concerts, but has since been added to the band's official online store. Each USB stick contains the following:

- Christmas Songs album in its entirety (MP3 files at 192 kbit/s bitrate)
- Acoustic version of "O Little Town of Bethlehem"
- Full-length music video for "Love Came Down at Christmas" (M4V video format)
- Readings of "First Breath", "Life As Advent", "The Burden of Hope" and "Who Gets to be Santa" from the book Peace Is Here, written by members of Jars of Clay
- Live video performances of "Hibernation Day" and "Drummer Boy" from the Gospel Music Channel's Christmas at Union Station special

== Awards ==
In 2008, the album was nominated for a Dove Award for Christmas Album of the Year at the 39th GMA Dove Awards.

== Credits ==
Jars of Clay

- Dan Haseltine – vocals
- Charlie Lowell – keyboards, pianos, backing vocals
- Stephen Mason – guitars, backing vocals
- Matt Odmark – guitars, backing vocals

Additional musicians

- Gabe Ruschival – keyboards, bass, percussion, vibraphone, bells, backing vocals
- Jeremy Lutito – drums, percussion, bells, vibraphone, backing vocals
- Mitch Dane – tambourine
- Sam Levine – flute, woodwinds
- Jeff Bailey – trumpet
- Gil Long – tuba
- Jennifer Kummer – French horn
- John Catchings – cello
- Carole Rabinowitz – cello
- Jim Grosjean – viola
- Kristin Wilkinson – viola
- Conni Ellisor – violin
- Pamela Sixfin – violin
- Alan Umstead – violin
- Tom Howard – horn and string arrangements
- Carl Gorodetzky – orchestra leader
- Christine Denté – vocals

Production

- Jars of Clay – producer
- Mitch Dane – recording, engineer
- Vance Powell – recording, engineer, mixing
- Mike Odmark – recording assisting, assistant engineer
- Mike Paragone – recording assistant
- Joshua Vance Smith – recording assistant, assistant engineer, mix assistant
- Richard Dodd – mastering at RichardDodd.com, Nashville, Tennessee
- Christie Little – package illustrations and design
- Recorded, engineered and mixed at Sputnik Sound, Nashville, Tennessee
- Additional recording at East Iris Studios, Nashville, Tennessee
