= Jars of Clay (album) =

Studio album by Jars of Clay
- Released: October 24, 1995
- Studio: The Icebox Studio, Glendale, California; Battery Studios, Nashville, Tennessee; Recording Arts, Nashville, Tennessee; Texana Studio, Nashville, Tennessee; Greenville College Studio, Greenville, Illinois
- Genre: Alternative rock, Christian rock, Folk rock, Chamber pop
- Length: 65:36
- Label: Essential, Silvertone
- Producer: Jars of Clay, Adrian Belew

Jars of Clay chronology
| Frail (demo) (1994) | Jars of Clay (1995) | Drummer Boy EP (1995) |

Alternative covers
- Commemorative platinum release

Professional ratings
Review scores
| Source | Rating |
|---|---|
| AllMusic | 4.5/5 stars |
| Cross Rhythms | 10/10 stars |
| Entertainment Weekly | C |
| Jesus Freak Hideout | 5/5 stars |

Jars of Clay is the first full-length studio album by Christian rock group Jars of Clay. It was released on October 24, 1995, by Essential Records. The album was released to commercial and critical acclaim, becoming one of the few Christian albums in the mid-1990s to achieve platinum status.

== Overview ==
Jars of Clay's eponymous first full-length album is characterized by a combination of drum loops and acoustic guitar strumming that would become an early trademark of the band. Strings are also used prominently in most of the songs. The album features sonic influences as diverse as Gregorian chants, mandolin, and gothic layered vocals.

The album was mostly self-produced, with the exception of "Liquid" and "Flood" which were produced by King Crimson guitarist Adrian Belew.

Several tracks from this album were hits on Christian radio, and as a result they have been staples of the band's live concerts ever since. The song "Flood" became an unexpected hit on mainstream pop and alternative rock radio as well, resulting in a brief period of mainstream popularity for the band during which they toured with artists such as Sting, The Samples and Matchbox Twenty, and were included in several movie soundtracks.

Most of this album consists of reworked versions of songs from the band's demo, Frail, which was recorded as a class project during their senior year of college. The song "He" appears to be almost identical to the original recording.

The songs "Sinking", "Flood", "Worlds Apart", and "Blind" were all unique to this release, as all other tracks had previously been released on the group's debut demo album Frail, and two songs from the demo did not make it to this album"—Fade to Grey" and EP's title track "Frail", though these were both later included on the group's follow-up, Much Afraid, which also introduced lyrics into the previously instrumental piece "Frail".

Notably, Jars of Clay is considered to be a landmark album in Christian rock, even though very few electric guitars are used, leading some to categorize Jars of Clay as folk-rock, alternative folk, or even pop instead.

The album was listed at No. 22 in the 2001 book, CCM Presents: The 100 Greatest Albums in Christian Music.

== Background ==
Jars of Clay began at Greenville College in Greenville, IL, where the four members, all majors in Contemporary Christian Music, met and discovered friendship through music. Charlie Lowell, Dan Haseltine and Matt Bronleewe had been there for the year of 1992 and played in various bands as well as producing their own studio projects. These bands included Chrysalis, Jazon, Yellow #7, Second Level, and many other school bands involving students from the CCM department as well as others. When Stephen Mason appeared on the scene in September 1993, and had similar interests in music, the friends decided to write a song together. Haseltine had met Mason because he had a Toad the Wet Sprocket shirt on, a band which they both admired for their unique sound. The band wrote and recorded a song called "Fade to Grey", which included many drum loops and samples, a very techno-oriented song. It was a studio project for credit in a recording class. Their friends enjoyed the song and they performed it in late October for a college cafe called the "Underground Cafe", which they had put together to raise money for homeless shelters and jail ministries. The "Underground" was the dormitory that the vast majority of music majors inhabited. The band continued classes and when they found more time, decided to play "Little Drummer Boy" for the Underground Cafe on December 7, as it was nearing Christmas time. A strange and distorted version of "Rudolph the Red-Nosed Reindeer" was also played impromptu that evening, to the tune of Nirvana's "Smells Like Teen Spirit", called "Smells Like Rudolph".

Following Christmas vacation, the four of them decided they'd like to write additional songs to add to their live repertoire and satisfy the requirements of their recording studio class, but thought it would be appropriate to give a name to these collaborations. Lowell recalled a Bible verse that included the phrase "Jars of Clay", and was the source of the band's name.

On April 27, 1994, Jars of Clay performed for the Gospel Music Association Spotlight Competition at 328 Performance Hall in Nashville, TN. This appearance was the final test of the competition for best new Christian band, and Jars won the competition. They played "Fade to Grey" and "Like a Child" complete with choreography and baby "binkies" in their mouths and met with positive responses from record companies who were present.

The band decided to finish up their demo CD which was entitled Frail. They printed 1,000 copies for friends and family members to purchase and had a small release party at school. The CD sold well, and by June they printed 500 more for record companies and those who weren't able to obtain them initially.

Due to interest from record labels in signing the band for an album, the band then decided that they should pursue music and move to Nashville, putting their college careers on hold. Bronleewe decided to remain in school, so it was necessary for the band to find a new member. A friend of Lowell from high school, Matt Odmark, was chosen to be the new member. His assimilation into the band was difficult, but by August the band was more comfortable after living together in Antioch, TN. They also accepted jobs during this time, at places such as pizza shops, mall stores and book warehouses while waiting for the contract.

They shopped their demo and met with many record companies during the summer, negotiated their potential contracts with a lawyer during autumn, and in winter finally signed with Essential Records, a division of Brentwood Music (now collectively entitled Provident Records). This was an unexpected step for the band, as Essential was the smallest company that they interviewed with, but they felt it was most like a family. In addition, Essential had solid backing power from the larger Brentwood Music company which owned it, and Brentwood used a secular distributor, Silvertone Records of Zomba/Jive, in order to reach a wider audience.

During the winter of 1994 and the spring of 1995 they recorded their debut album for Essential and released the album in May 1995. An intern at Essential, who was a friend of the band was the niece of improvisational guitarist and prolific songwriter Adrian Belew. She delivered the Frail demo to him and he was impressed. Belew then decided to produce a couple songs for the album. His previous collaborations with Laurie Anderson, Talking Heads, Nine Inch Nails, David Bowie, Frank Zappa and longtime involvement with King Crimson, made him a primary candidate for producer. They decided to have him produce "Flood" and "Liquid", the more alternative songs, and then they self-produced the remainder of the songs on the album due to a lack of money. Studio musicians were brought in to fill in gaps and Ron Huff did string arrangements to embellish the songs and give them an orchestral quality.

The first single from the debut album released to Christian radio was "Flood", and reached number one on the Christian rock charts. The band was met with high critical acclaim in numerous Christian magazine articles and other sources due to the unique harmonies and instrumentation on the album, as well as their honest and relatable lyrics.

Meanwhile, secular radio stations caught on to the popularity of the song and began to play it. Essential Records then decided to use parent label Silvertone to promote the album and send out CD singles to radio stations. Many of the radio stations loved the single and began to put it into regular rotation.

1996 was the year of intense success for the band. "Flood" hit the No. 1 position on numerous secular radio stations due to its popularity, and the album remained in the top 60 albums for much of the year, also remaining in Billboard's Top 200 albums for the entire 52-week cycle. The album went 'gold' and shortly after attained platinum status. The album has now sold over 3,000,000 copies worldwide.

== Tour ==
The band promoted the album heavily by performing and interviewing at many instore appearances and on secular radio shows. They continued to tour on their own through the summer of 1996 and decided to take the music to the club circuit where secular listeners could feel more comfortable seeing the band. This brought disappointment from Christian audiences who accused them of "going secular".

The band set up a very professional headlining tour of theaters such as The Roxy and House of Blues theaters for autumn 1996. They purchased their own sound and lights and brought Roddy Chong, a violinist, on tour, opening the shows with a classical violin piece and using backdrops such as folded curtains, oriental rugs and candelabras. The Samples opened the concerts for the first couple weeks and were shortly after dropped due to an incompatibility with Jars as well as their audience. The Gufs also opened for Jars of Clay during this time, among other bands, such as Sarah Masen, Duncan Sheik, Matchbox 20 and Sarah Jahn.

The band toured in support of other Christian acts, such as PFR, Sixpence None the Richer, as well as mainstream acts like Matchbox Twenty, Duncan Sheik, and Sting. This resulted in a small backlash from fundamentalist Christian groups.

In October 2010, Jars of Clay announced that during their 2010 fall tour they would perform their first album in its entirety to commemorate 15 years from the release.

== Track listings ==
Standard release
| No. | Title | Writer(s) | Length |
|---|---|---|---|
| 1. | "Liquid" | Matt Bronleewe, Charlie Lowell, Stephen Mason, Josh Cougle, Miguel DeJesus | 3:32 |
| 2. | "Sinking" | Lowell, Mason, Dan Haseltine, Matt Odmark | 3:48 |
| 3. | "Love Song for a Savior" | Haseltine, Bronleewe, Lowell, Mason | 4:46 |
| 4. | "Like a Child" | Haseltine, Bronleewe, Lowell, Mason | 4:35 |
| 5. | "Art In Me" | Haseltine, Bronleewe, Lowell, Mason | 3:58 |
| 6. | "He" | Haseltine, Bronleewe, Lowell, Mason | 5:20 |
| 7. | "Boy on a String" | Haseltine, Bronleewe, Lowell, Mason | 3:32 |
| 8. | "Flood" | Haseltine, Odmark, Lowell, Mason | 3:32 |
| 9. | "Worlds Apart" | Haseltine, Odmark, Lowell, Mason | 5:18 |
| 10. | "Blind" (contains the hidden track "Four Seven" and a strings studio session for "Blind") | Haseltine, Odmark, Lowell, Mason | 27:15 |
| Total length: | | | 65:36 |

Japanese release bonus tracks
| No. | Title | Writer(s) | Length |
|---|---|---|---|
| 11. | "Little Drummer Boy" | Harry Simeone, Katherine Kennicott Davis, Henry Onorati | 4:23 |
| 12. | "Flood" (Savage Flavor Remix) | Haseltine, Odmark, Lowell, Mason | 4:23 |

- On this release "Blind" does not contain the hidden tracks and runs for 4:04
- Track 11 originally appeared on the Drummer Boy EP
- Track 12 originally appeared on Vibe Central: The Essential Remixes

Jars of Clay Platinum bonus tracks
| No. | Title | Length |
|---|---|---|
| 11. | "Four Seven" | 2:42 |
| 12. | "Untitled" | 18:35 |

The album was re-released as Jars of Clay Platinum in 1996 when the self-titled debut attained platinum status. The album has the same track listing as the original, though cover and artwork are different from the original album, designed specifically to commemorate the album being a platinum release. Each of the 20,000 discs are numbered, providing each unit its own degree of uniqueness. The song "Four Seven" is no longer a hidden track, it is now part of the album as track 11. On this version "Blind" runs for 5:59 with the last two minutes being silence.

== Vinyl ==
In Celebration of its 15 Years from release a Double Vinyl Collector's Edition was included in the pre-order of Jars of Clay Presents The Shelter Deluxe Bundle which was released on October 5, 2010. The Vinyl was also sold on their The Rewind Tour 2010.

== Personnel ==
Jars of Clay

- Dan Haseltine – lead vocals, programming
- Charlie Lowell – organ, acoustic piano, backing vocals
- Matt Odmark – acoustic guitar, programming
- Stephen Mason – acoustic guitar, mandolin, bass guitar, backing vocals

Additional musicians

- Tim Smith – drums, percussion
- Matt Bronleewe – arrangements (1, 4–7), acoustic guitar (6)
- Adrian Belew – mandolin (1), bass (1), string orchestrations (1), cello (8)
- Noah Evens – violin (1, 8), string orchestrations (1, 8)
- Jeff Borders – arrangements (2, 3, 9)
- John Catchings – cello (2, 3, 9)
- Jonathan Yudkin – mandolin (3, 4), fiddle (4, 7)
- Sam Levine – recorder (3, 4)
- Bobby Taylor – oboe (5, 10)
- Ronn Huff – string orchestrations and conductor (5, 10)
- Craig Nelson – bass (5, 10)
- Bob Mason – cello (5, 10)
- Jim Grosjean – viola (5, 10)
- Pamela Sixfin – violin (5, 10)
- Marianne Osiel – oboe (9)
- Mancy A'lan Kane – backing vocals (9)
- Carl Gorodetzky – violin (10)

Production

- Adrian Belew – producer (1, 8)
- Jars of Clay – producers (2–7, 9, 10), art direction
- Robert Beeson – executive producer, art direction, black and white photography
- Jon Easterling – engineer (1–10)
- Noah Evens – recording (1, 8), mixing (1, 2, 4, 7, 8)
- Charlie Lowell – engineer (6)
- Stephen Leiweke – engineer (6)
- Wade Jaynes – assistant engineer
- JB – mixing (3, 5, 6, 9, 10)
- Ken Love – mastering at Master Mix, Nashville, Tennessee
- Lester Phillips – design
- Tamara Reynolds – cover photography
- Josh Cougle – inspiration
- Miguel DeJesus – inspiration
- Battery Studios – mixing location
- Adrian Belew's Studio – mixing location

== Charts ==
Album charts & RIAA certifications

| Release year | The Billboard 200 Chart position | RIAA certification |
|---|---|---|
| 1996 | 46 | 2× Platinum |

Singles - Billboard (North America) - 1996

| Song | Chart | Position |
|---|---|---|
| "Flood" | Mainstream Rock Tracks | 16 |
| "Flood" | Modern Rock Tracks | 12 |
| "Flood" | The Billboard Hot 100 | 37 |

Christian radio singles

| No | Single | Year |
|---|---|---|
| 1 | "Flood" | 1995 |
| 2 | "Liquid" | 1995 |
| 3 | "Love Song for a Savior" | 1996 |
| 4 | "Like a Child" | 1996 |
| 5 | "Worlds Apart" | 1996 |

== Singles ==
=== Liquid ===
"Liquid" is the second radio single from Jars of Clay from their self-titled debut album. The song was written while the band members were students at Greenville College. The first recording of the song appears on the band's 1994 demo album, Frail. The song was recorded again in 1995 for their self-titled debut album. It was first recorded with production work by the band, then it was recorded again when Adrian Belew was brought on board to produce two of the album's tracks. An acoustic version of "Liquid" appears on the band's 2003 double album, Furthermore: From the Studio, From the Stage.

==== Track listing ====
1. "Liquid" (Radio Edit)
2. "Liquid" (Album Version)
