= Who We Are Instead =

2003 studio album by Jars of Clay

Studio album by Jars of Clay
- Released: November 4, 2003
- Recorded: 2003
- Studio: East Iris Studios, Nashville, Tennessee; Sputnik Sound, Nashville, Tennessee
- Genre: Christian rock, folk rock
- Length: 51:02
- Label: Essential
- Producer: Jars of Clay, Mitch Dane, Ron Aniello

Jars of Clay chronology
Furthermore: From the Studio, From the Stage (2003)	Who We Are Instead (2003)	Roots & Wings (2005)

Who We Are Instead is the fifth full-length studio album recorded by Christian rock band Jars of Clay and produced by Mitch Dane. It was released in 2003 by Essential Records.

== Composition ==
Representing their most acoustic-based since their first disc, Who We Are Instead is the band's most relaxed-sounding material to date. The stripped-down sound accompanied a more direct focus on their spirituality, with gospel influences apparent in some of the songs and the names of God and Jesus being more explicitly mentioned throughout the disc. Guitarist Steve Mason proved to be rather versatile on this album, with several songs featuring either the lap steel or mandolin.

The songs "Show You Love" and "Sunny Days", two of the more upbeat songs on a generally contemplative and reflective album, were released as singles.

The album features two covers: The 1974 song "Lonely People" by America, and the 1971 composition "Jesus' Blood Never Failed Me Yet" by Gavin Bryars. The song "Amazing Grace" is not a cover of the popular hymn but rather an original song written by the band.

== Release ==
"Show You Love" is the first single. The song is prominently featured in the Adam Sandler motion picture, Spanglish. The song is played at the end of an episode of The WB television series Summerland, as well as in an episode of the UPN series Kevin Hill. This song also appears on the WOW Hits 2005 compilation album, and the 2008 greatest hits album Jars of Clay: Greatest Hits.

"Sunny Days" is the second single. The first recording of the song during the album's sessions was produced by the band, while the version that ended up on the album was produced by Ron Aniello, who also produced Lifehouse's debut album, No Name Face.

== Critical reception ==
Professional ratings
Review scores
Source	Rating
AllMusic	4/5 stars
Christianity Today	5/5 stars
Cross Rhythms	10/10 stars
Jesus Freak Hideout	4.5/5 stars

It is the band's only full-length studio album not to be nominated by either GMA Dove Awards or Grammy Awards.

On 2005, the song was nominated for a Dove Award for Rock Recorded Song of the Year at the 36th GMA Dove Awards.

== Track listing ==
All tracks are written by Dan Haseltine, Charlie Lowell, Stephen Mason and Matt Odmark, unless otherwise noted

No.	Title	Writer(s)	Length
1.	"Sunny Days"		3:30
2.	"Amazing Grace" (featuring Ashley Cleveland)		5:18
3.	"Lonely People" (America cover)	Dan Peek; Cathy Peek	2:45
4.	"Only Alive"		4:04
5.	"Trouble Is" (featuring Kenny Meeks)	Dan Haseltine; Charlie Lowell; Stephen Mason; Matt Odmark; Aaron Sands	3:50
6.	"Faith Enough"		5:24
7.	"Show You Love"		3:33
8.	"Lesser Things"		4:36
9.	"I'm in the Way"		2:33
10.	"Jesus Blood Never Failed Me Yet" (Gavin Bryars cover)	Gavin Bryars	3:39
11.	"Jealous Kind" (featuring Ashley Cleveland)		4:10
12.	"Sing"		4:11
13.	"My Heavenly"		3:29
Total length:			51:02

Special edition bonus tracks
No.	Title	Length
1.	"Tonight"	3:42
2.	"Shipwrecked"	2:58
Total length:		57:42

== Personnel ==
Jars of Clay

- Dan Haseltine – vocals, percussion
- Charlie Lowell – acoustic piano, keyboards, organ, accordion, backing vocals
- Stephen Mason – vocals, guitars, lap steel guitar, mandolin, National guitar, pedal steel guitar
- Matt Odmark – acoustic guitars, banjo, backing vocals

Additional musicians

- Kenny Meeks – mandolin (5), vocals (5)
- Aaron Sands – bass (1, 6, 7, 12)
- Ken Coomer – drums (1, 2, 8, 9)
- Ben Mize – drums (1, 6, 12)
- Chris McHugh – drums (7)
- John Catchings – cello (1, 4, 8, 10, 11)
- Ashley Cleveland – vocals (2, 11)

Production

- Robert Beeson – executive producer
- Ron Aniello – producer (1, 6, 7, 12), recording (1, 6, 7, 12)
- Jars of Clay – producers (2–5, 8–11)
- Mitch Dane – producer (2–5, 8–11), recording (2–5, 8–11)
- Clint Roth – recording (1, 6, 7, 12)
- David Thoener – recording (1, 6, 7, 12)
- Jacquire King – mixing, additional engineer (7, 12), drum recording (7)
- Mike Paragone – assistant engineer (1, 6, 7, 12)
- Sang Park – assistant engineer (1, 6, 7, 12)
- Richard Dodd – mastering at RichardDodd.com, Nashville, Tennessee
- Michelle Pearson – A&R production
- Dan Haseltine – art direction
- John Rummen – cover design
- Jamie Anderson – interior design
- Martyn Atkins – band photography
- Crystal Heald – nature photography
- Hank Schiffmacher – Jesus' blood tattoo photography
- Robin Geary – hair stylist, make-up
- Star Klem – stylist

== Charts ==
Chart (2003)	Peak position
US Billboard 200	103
