= Inland (Jars of Clay album) =

Studio album by Jars of Clay
- Released: August 27, 2013
- Recorded: July 2012
- Studio: Flora Recording & Playback, Portland, Oregon
- Genre: Christian rock; pop rock; alternative rock; acoustic rock
- Length: 50:36
- Label: Gray Matters
- Producer: Tucker Martine

Jars of Clay chronology
The Shelter (2010)	Inland (2013)

Inland is the eleventh and final studio album by rock band Jars of Clay, released on August 27, 2013, by Gray Matters label. The album was produced by Tucker Martine at Flora Recording & Playback in Portland, Oregon. It has seen significant charting successes, and has garnered critical acclamation. It was nominated for Rock/Contemporary Album of the Year by the GMA Dove Awards.

== Background ==
The album was recorded in Portland, Oregon, at Flora Recording & Playback in July 2012 by the band, and it was produced by Tucker Martine.

== Release and promotion ==
The album was released on August 27, 2013, by Gray Matters label. The song "Love in Hard Times" was packaged with the purchase their EP entitled Under the Weather (Live in Sellersville, PA), and this occurred on March 18, 2013. "Inland" was released as a promotional single by the band through Rolling Stone on June 17, 2013, which was free to download. On June 18, 2013, the band released the lead single "After the Fight" from the album. On August 20, 2013, Jars of Clay allowed Billboard to stream the album.

== Critical reception ==
Professional ratings
Review scores
Source	Rating
CCM Magazine	4/5 stars
The Christian Manifesto	5/5 stars
The Christian Music Review Blog	5/5 stars
CM Addict	3.5/5 stars
Indie Vision Music	4/5 stars
Jesus Freak Hideout	4.5/5 stars
Louder Than the Music	5/5 stars
New Release Tuesday	4.5/5 stars
The Phantom Tollbooth	5/5 stars
The Phantom Tollbooth	4/5 stars
The Phantom Tollbooth	4.5/5 stars

Inland garnered universal critical acclaim by music critics. Andy Argyrakis of CCM Magazine said that "the group continues pushing creative and lyrical boundaries eleven albums later. Rather than taking the safe and easy radio route, the group turns to producer Tucker Martine ... for a hipster friendly journey of melodic pop treasures that candidly discuss life's many emotions during uncertain times".

At New Release Tuesday, Kevin Davis noted the album for its "beauty and transparency" and stated that the release is "All it was meant to be". Roger Gelwicks of Jesus Freak Hideout called the album "essential listening" and said that the release "demonstrates that the band's identity rests in revitalizing change". He further stated that band has "stayed incredibly fascinating" in their musical longevity, making the album "all the more impressive". In addition, Gelwicks noted the album as being "original at the core and rooted in practiced experience". At Indie Vision Music, Ian Zandi said that he would "put this record on par with their classic self-titled album and The Long Fall Back to Earth".

Writers at the Phantom Tollbooth described the album as a "brilliant artistic statement" and "a new bencharmk". Although it may not quite match some of the beauty of The Long Fall Back to Earth, it is still a "melody-fuelled work, rich in lyrical imagery," with songs "meld together to create story".

Calvin Moore of the Christian Manifesto felt that "Inland offers what has always made this a great band: thoughtful, honest, hard-pressed questions, lyrics that present the beautiful struggle, and music that draws the listener into the longing for more". In addition, Moore noted that "Jars of Clay still makes stellar music", and he said that "a little consistency in a world full of inconsistency is never a bad thing".

At Louder Than the Music, Jono Davies said that the release "is full of hit after hit". Julia Kitzing of CM Addict said that she was "not hearing strong references to their faith". At the Christian Music Review Blog, Jim Wilkerson stated, "f you are looking for a collection of songs that will not only be satisfying to the ears, but also make you think, then I am sure Inland will do the trick." Rob Snyder of Alpha Omega News graded the album an A and said, "Good luck finding vertical lyrics but I do love the intelligence of the lyrics; words to make you think without any one dropping f-bombs or relaying on tried and trite tirades."

== Commercial performance ==
For the Billboard charting week of September 14, 2013, Inland reached No. 70 on the Billboard 200, No. 2 on Top Christian Albums, No. 14 on Top Independent Albums, and No. 20 on Top Rock Albums.

== Track listing ==
All tracks are written by Jars of Clay unless otherwise noted below

No.	Title	Writer(s)	Length
1.	"After the Fight"		4:32
2.	"Age of Immature Mistakes"		3:53
3.	"Reckless Forgiver"		3:52
4.	"Human Race"		3:57
5.	"Love in Hard Times"		4:31
6.	"Pennsylvania"		4:33
7.	"Loneliness & Alcohol"		4:45
8.	"I Don't Want You to Forget"		3:49
9.	"Fall Asleep"		4:41
10.	"Skin & Bones"		3:52
11.	"Left Undone"		3:58
12.	"Inland"	Nathan Barlowe, Jars of Clay	4:13
Total length:			50:36

== Personnel ==
Jars of Clay

- Dan Haseltine – lead vocals, handclaps (4)
- Charlie Lowell – pianos, keyboards, backing vocals, handclaps (4)
- Stephen Mason – guitars, backing vocals, handclaps (4)
- Matt Odmark – guitars, backing vocals, handclaps (4)

Additional musicians

- Adrian Belew – guitars (1)
- Matt Chamberlain – drums
- Michael Finn – handclaps (4)
- Mitch Dane – vibraslap (12)
- Nathaniel Smith – cello (9)
- Jeremy Kittel – viola (2, 6, 7, 9), violin (2, 6, 7, 9), string arrangements (2, 6, 7, 9)
- John Mark Painter – horns (12), arrangements (12)

Production

- Tucker Martine – producer, engineer
- Jacquire King – mixing (1, 2, 4, 10)
- Beau Sorenson – mixing (3, 5–9, 11, 12)
- Roger Seibel – mastering at SAE Mastering, Phoenix, Arizona
- Wayne Brezinka – art direction, design, layout
- David Braud – photography
- Overdubbed at Gray Matters Studio, Nashville, Tennessee

== Charts ==
Chart (2013)	Peak position
US Billboard 200	70
US Top Christian Albums (Billboard)	2
US Independent Albums (Billboard)	14
US Top Rock Albums (Billboard)	20
