= The Long Fall Back to Earth =

Studio album by Jars of Clay
- Released: April 21, 2009
- Recorded: 2008–2009
- Studios: Sputnik Sound, Nashville, Tennessee
- Genres: Christian rock; electronic pop; pop rock; synth-rock
- Length: 59:06
- Labels: Gray Matters; Essential
- Producers: Jars of Clay; Ron Aniello

Jars of Clay chronology
Closer EP (2008)	The Long Fall Back to Earth (2009)	The Shelter (2010)

Singles from The Long Fall Back to Earth
- 1. "Two Hands" Released: March 10, 2009; 2. "Heaven" Released: Late October 2009

Professional ratings
Review scores
Source	Rating
AllMusic	4/5 stars
The Christian Manifesto	4.5/5 stars
Christianity Today	4.5/5 stars
CM Spin	8.69/10
Cross Rhythms	9/10 stars
Indie Vision Music	4/5 stars
Jesus Freak Hideout	5/5 stars
Louder Than the Music	4.8/5
New Release Tuesday	4/5 stars
Patrol magazine	6.9/10

The Long Fall Back to Earth is the ninth full-length studio album by the American Christian rock band Jars of Clay. It was released on April 21, 2009, through Gray Matters and Essential Records. The album was nominated for a Grammy Award in the Best Pop/Contemporary Gospel Album category in 2010.

== Overview ==
The Long Fall Back to Earth is the first Jars of Clay album that doesn't include any cover songs since 2002's The Eleventh Hour.

In February 2009, the band released the first single off the album, "Two Hands", and this was followed by the second single, "Heaven", in October.

The Long Fall Back to Earth came in at number ten on Jesus Freak Hideout's most-anticipated albums of 2009.

== Reception ==
AllMusic said that the album "sees the quartet adopting, in varying degrees, the electronic pop stylings of David Bowie, the Flaming Lips, and MGMT, partially furloughing their live rhythm section in favor of one inspired by the '80s", while JesusFreakHideout said that the album is a "lush collection of pop rock songs with an indie touch that proves to be a well-balanced and solid effort from start to finish", and that "The style of the album itself is — yet again, in true Jars of Clay fashion — a noticeable departure from the sound of their previous release, carrying with it a strong 80's synth-rock vibe."

== Track listing ==
All tracks are written by Jars of Clay, except where noted.

No.	Title	Writer(s)	Length
1.	"The Long Fall"		2:19
2.	"Weapons"		3:28
3.	"Two Hands"	Jars of Clay, Jeremy Lutito, Gabe Ruschival	4:26
4.	"Heaven"	Jars of Clay, Lutito, Ruschival	3:18
5.	"Closer"		3:56
6.	"Safe to Land"		4:47
7.	"Headphones"		4:54
8.	"Don't Stop"		3:44
9.	"Boys (Lesson One)"		4:01
10.	"Hero"		4:52
11.	"Scenic Route"	Jars of Clay, Lutito, Ruschival	5:41
12.	"There Might Be a Light"		3:56
13.	"Forgive Me"		3:53
14.	"Heart"		5:50
Total length:			59:06

iTunes deluxe edition bonus tracks
No.	Title	Length
15.	"Headphones (Jeff Savage's Tomorrowland remix)"	4:48
16.	"Two Hands (JMO remix)"	5:18
17.	"Stories Behinds the Songs" (Video)	9:52

Overcuts and Remixes – EP
No.	Title	Length
1.	"Save My Soul"	3:07
2.	"Caught-Escape"	3:20
3.	"Love Won't Let Us"	3:59
4.	"Headphones (Jeff Savage's Tomorrowland remix)"	4:48
5.	"Heaven (Jeff Savage's Love of Silence remix)"	3:36
6.	"Heart (Jeff Savage's Solar Funk remix)"	5:05
Total length:		23:53

== Charts ==
The album peaked at no. 29 on the Billboard 200 and no. 1 on Billboard's Hot Christian Albums.

== Awards ==
In 2010, both the regular and limited edition of the album were nominated for a Dove Award for Recorded Music Packaging of the Year at the 41st GMA Dove Awards, with the limited edition winning the prize. The album also won the award for Pop/Contemporary Album of the Year, while the song "Two Hands" was also nominated for Song of the Year.

The Long Fall Back to Earth was nominated for a Grammy Award in the Best Pop/Contemporary Gospel Album category at the 52nd Annual Grammy Awards.

== Credits ==
Jars of Clay

- Dan Haseltine – vocals
- Charlie Lowell – acoustic piano, keyboards, synthesizers, organ, backing vocals
- Stephen Mason – guitars, backing vocals
- Matthew Odmark – guitars, backing vocals

Additional musicians

- Gabe Ruschival – bass guitar, keyboard bass, percussion
- Jeremy Lutito – drums, percussion, loops, sounds
- Katie Herzig – backing vocals (7, 8)

Choir on "Weapons"

- Jars of Clay, Ben Shive, Joshua V. Smith

Production

- Jars of Clay – producers at Sputnik Sound, Nashville, Tennessee; art direction
- Ron Aniello – producer (4, 5, 6, 11, 12)
- Mitch Dane – engineer
- Vance Powell – engineer (7, 8, 10, 13, 14)
- Joshua V. Smith – assistant engineer
- Jay Ruston – mixing at TRS West, Sherman Oaks, California
- Stephen Marsh – mastering at Marsh Mastering, Los Angeles, California
- Michelle Box – A&R production
- Tim Parker – art direction
- Kharyn Hill – photography
- Brandy St. John – stylist
- Denika Bedrossian – hair, make-up
