= Brother Brother =

- Birth name: Bradley Anderson, Brett Anderson
- Born: Sarasota, Florida
- Genres: Folk rock
- Instrument(s): Vocals, guitar, banjo, drums
- Years active: 2015–present
- Website: brotherbrothermusic.com

Brother Brother is a Nashville-based sibling duo from Sarasota, Florida. Their sound has been described as "mesmerizing and uplifting" and "emphatically endearing."

The brothers, Bradley Anderson and Brett Anderson released their debut studio album, The New Kids on October 27, 2017. The record was produced by Matt Odmark of Jars of Clay. The singles off the album include "Feels like 1901," "Novocaine," and "Better Places."

== Career ==
Brother Brother grew up surrounded by music. Many of their family members, including their father, were musicians. They gravitated towards music from a young age. Brett started playing piano at age 3 before getting interested in banjo at around 9 or 10. Bradley began playing drums at 7, and eventually started playing guitar at 11. They officially started playing as Brother Brother in 2013. The band played for fun until they met Gold record selling entertainer Jim Stafford who invited the brothers to perform at the Jim Stafford Theatre in Branson, Missouri. Here, they went from playing 10 shows a year to 10 shows a week. The band played for two seasons in Branson before moving on to record their debut studio album. While both Brothers provided vocals for the album, Bradley contributed guitar and Brett played banjo and electric banjo. Other contributors include Aaron Stoner on Bass, Paul Eckberg on percussion, and Charlie Lowell on keys, organ, and synth. Brother Brother started touring in 2017 in support of their new record.

== Discography ==
- 2015 "Brother Brother"
- 2017 "The New Kids"
- 2018 "Some People I Know"
- 2021 "Calla Lily"
- 2022 "Cover to Cover"

== Singles ==
- 2016 Perfect Story (Reagan K & Brother Brother)
- 2017 Better Places
- 2017 Feels Like 1901
- 2017 Novocaine
