= Honoring a Father's Dream: Sons of Lwala =

- Theatrical Poster
- Directed by: Barry Simmons
- Produced by: Mitchell Galin; David Kiern; Barry Simmons
- Starring: Milton Ochieng'; Fred Ochieng'; Omondi Ochieng'; Dan Haseltine; Bill Frist; Bill Clinton
- Cinematography: Iain Montgomery
- Edited by: Iain Montgomery; Mike Rose; Jerry Walker; David Kiern
- Music by: Jars of Clay
- Production company: Epiphany Documentary Films
- Release date: July 15, 2011
- Running time: 71 minutes
- Country: United States
- Language: English

Honoring a Father's Dream: Sons of Lwala is a 2011 documentary film. Directed by Barry Simmons and produced by Mitchell Galin, David Kiern, and Barry Simmons for Epiphany Documentary Films, it follows the story of two Kenyan brothers who build a health clinic in their home village.

== Plot ==
Milton and Fred Ochieng’ are two brothers from Lwala, Kenya whose village sent them to America to become doctors. But after losing both parents to AIDS they are left with a heartbreaking task: to return home and finish the health clinic their father started before getting sick. Unable to raise enough money on their own, the brothers are joined by students, politicians, and a rock band who launch a fund raising drive among young people across the United States.

== Soundtrack ==
Jars of Clay wrote an original score for Honoring a Father's Dream: Sons of Lwala. The song "Prisoner of Hope," which is heard at the end of the film, was included on the Closer EP. "A Country of My Own," by Thad Cockrell is also featured in the film.

== Release ==
Honoring a Father's Dream: Sons of Lwala was selected to screen at the 2011 Attic Film Festival.
