= Mini Monsters =

EP by Jars of Clay
- Released: August 8, 2006
- Recorded: 2006
- Genre: Christian rock
- Length: 10:09
- Label: Essential
- Producer: Jars of Clay

Jars of Clay chronology
iTunes Originals - Jars of Clay (2005)	Mini Monsters (2006)	Good Monsters (2006)

Mini Monsters is a 2006 EP release by Christian rock group Jars of Clay, It preceded the release of their 2006 studio album, Good Monsters. The EP was released exclusively through online digital music stores, such as iTunes, Walmart.com, etc. The track "Love Me" is a B-side from the recording sessions of Good Monsters.

== Track listing ==
Note: All tracks written by Charlie Lowell, Dan Haseltine, Matt Odmark, Stephen Mason, unless otherwise noted

1. "Work" (Radio Edit) - 3:39
2. "Dead Man (Carry Me)" - 3:19
3. "Love Me" - 3:11
