= Flood (Jars of Clay song) =

1996 single by Jars of Clay

Single by Jars of Clay

from the album Jars of Clay
- Released: 1996
- Genre: Alternative rock
- Length: 3:31 (album version)
- Label: Silvertone; Essential
- Songwriters: Dan Haseltine; Charlie Lowell; Stephen Mason; Matt Odmark
- Producer: Adrian Belew

Jars of Clay singles chronology
| "Flood" (1996) | "Liquid" (1995) |

Audio sample
- "Flood": file; help

Music videos
- "Flood" (original version) on YouTube
- "Flood" (MTV version) on YouTube

"Flood" is a song written and performed by American Christian rock band Jars of Clay. Critics cited "Flood" as the band's breakthrough song due to airplay on contemporary Christian music and alternative rock radio stations, two radio formats which rarely intersect. It was released in early 1996 as their debut single and is from their self-titled debut album (1995). "Flood" was a multi-format crossover hit in the United States, peaking at No. 12 on the Billboard Modern Rock Tracks chart, and No. 25 and 37 on the Cash Box Top 100 and Billboard Hot 100 charts. It was also a hit in Canada, where it reached No. 3 on the RPM 100 Hit Tracks chart. The song also saw heavy rotation on MTV during the mid-to-late-1990s.

== Formats and track listings ==
All songs were written by Charlie Lowell, Dan Haseltine, Matt Odmark, and Stephen Mason.

- US single
1. "Flood" – 3:31
2. "Sinking" – 3:47
- UK maxi-CD single
1. "Flood" (Savage Flavor remix) – 4:24
2. "Flood" – 3:33
3. "Sinking" – 3:48
4. "Blind" (The Fluffy-Sav Smoothed Out mix) – 5:08

== Charts ==
=== Weekly charts ===
| Chart (1996) | Peak position |
|---|---|
| Canada Top Singles (RPM) | 3 |
| US Billboard Hot 100 | 37 |
| US Adult Alternative Airplay (Billboard) | 4 |
| US Adult Pop Airplay (Billboard) | 29 |
| US Alternative Airplay (Billboard) | 12 |
| US Mainstream Rock Airplay (Billboard) | 16 |
| US Pop Airplay (Billboard) | 19 |
| US Cash Box Top 100 | 25 |

=== Year-end charts ===
| Chart (1996) | Position |
|---|---|
| Canada Top Singles (RPM) | 38 |
| US Mainstream Rock Tracks (Billboard) | 73 |
| US Modern Rock Tracks (Billboard) | 59 |
| US Top 40/Mainstream (Billboard) | 81 |
| US Triple-A (Billboard) | 10 |

== In popular culture ==
"Flood" plays over the closing credits of the 1998 film Hard Rain and is used in the 2002 film A Walk to Remember. It was the theme song of the A&E reality show, God or the Girl.

== See also ==
- Genesis flood narrative
