= The Royalty (album) =

Studio album by The Royal Royal
- Released: November 6, 2012
- Genres: Contemporary worship music, acoustic, pop rock
- Length: 54:46
- Label: Essential
- Producers: Nathan Finochio, David Kuwabara

The Royal Royal chronology
The Royal EP (2012)	The Royalty (2012)

The Royalty is the debut studio album by contemporary worship music duo The Royal Royal, released on November 6, 2012, on the Essential Records label.

== Critical reception ==
Professional ratings
Review scores
Source	Rating
AllMusic	4/5 stars
CCM Magazine	4/5 stars
Indie Vision Music	3/5 stars
Jesus Freak Hideout	3.5/5 stars 4/5 stars
New Release Tuesday	4/5 stars
Worship Leader	4.5/5 stars

AllMusic's Robert Ham said that "The Royalty is one of the more surprising releases of 2012, and definitely one of the best CCM records of the past five years. That said, the album does have its failings. About three-quarters of the way through, the brothers Finochio fall back on the creaky emotional resonances that can be found in some of Coldplay's lesser efforts. But they quickly right the ship, closing the album with a trio of songs that take some delightfully unexpected turns...Moves like that go a long way toward pushing this inventive and entertaining group to the head of an overstuffed CCM pack."

CCM Magazine's Andrew Greer said that "The first LP from the Canadian worship duo—made up of brothers Nathan and Gabriel Finochio—is symply hypnotic. Beautifully marrying delicate indie melodies with charming vocals and effectively spacious tracks, threaded together by fail proof scripture lyrics, this is an atypically original worship debut—musically and lyrically."

Indie Vision Music's Carter Fraser said that "I apologize for when I suggested that no one was approaching worship from an indie rock standpoint; The Royal Royal are more or less trying. Granted, it's not like they're the next Danielson or something, but The Royalty does sound much more similar to, say, a power-pop Arcade Fire than 90% of worship music. In fact, if you were to listen to The Royalty without the lyrics, you wouldn't be able to tell it's a worship album at all. That's a terrific testament to the originality present. Sometimes the style contrasts with the plainly worshipful lyrics so much that the listener is forced to do a double take; while neither The Royal Royal's style nor lyricism are unexplored, they haven't been combined quite like this." However, Fraser cautioned that "Now don't get too excited yet, there's still much work to be done for the Ontario natives. There's a lot of inconsistency littered throughout The Royalty but when they're at their best, the result is striking...There's quite simply more songwriting talent here than in other acts, yet it's still undeveloped. At this point it may just be that The Royal Royal are still sort of naïve. For this reason it's fair to call The Royalty a "pop" album when referring to its accessibility, though there are more creative undercurrents present than the term suggests.

Jesus Freak Hideout's Roger Gelwicks said that "The next step, then, is to channel this positive energy brimming with possibilities and turn it into a strong sophomore release. The Royalty still conforms to the set standard of a worship album too closely to call this album truly revolutionary, but The Royal Royal is nonetheless one of the most exciting worship acts to come around in a long time, and here's hoping that they'll only rise in innovation from here." But, Gelwick wrote that the band "...raise a welcomed stir." Jesus Freak Hideout's Bert Gangl said that "A few of the songs tend to drag on a bit. And cuts like 'Saviour' and one or two others may strike some as slightly too precious for their own good. But, even with these missteps taken into account, The Royalty is a distinctly winning effort that offers something for pop, folk and dance music lovers ... and their parents."

New Release Tuesday's Sarah Fine said that she "...heard good things about The Royal Royal going into this album, and they definitely lived up to it. Combining passionate spiritual songs of adoration with the fresh sounds of a generation, Royal is a strong beginning in what I'm sure will be a lengthy and highly accredited carrier for the Finochio brothers." However, Fine warned that "This isn't contemporary worship to say the least and may not be for those seeking something more melodically traditional, but for fans seeking something similar to immerging worship acts like John Mark McMillan, Gungor and Daniel Bashta, you will not want to miss this release."

Worship Leader's Barry Westman said that "The Royalty, which contains 14 original songs filled with a truly fresh, new sound that really doesn't fit into any previously established genre of music for worship. Yet, the message of each song contains timeless vertical expressions of praise to the Lord. In the first few tracks, you'll hear the upbeat, heavily synthesized sound—a bit of a '80s New Wave throwback style, yet uniquely current. The rest of the album shifts between that approach and a simpler, more relaxed feel, with minimalistic drums and guitars underneath a web of vocal harmonies, hardly sounding like only two singers. But, just when you think you have them figured out, they deliver a completely new sound on songs like 'How Long' and 'October.' The Royal Royal has truly created an album that 'gives us what we need: to see old truths as though they are new.'"

== Track listing ==
All tracks are written by The Royal Royal except where noted.

No.	Title	Length
1.	"Love"	3:57
2.	"Praise Him" (Matthew Crocker, Nathan)	5:36
3.	"To You"	3:43
4.	"Heartbeats"	4:04
5.	"How Wonderful" (Joel Auge, Crocker, The Royal Royal)	6:08
6.	"Savior" (Gabriel)	3:16
7.	"How Long" (Nathan)	1:56
8.	"Life in Your Hand"	3:38
9.	"Mighty Hands"	3:33
10.	"My Salvation"	4:57
11.	"My Hope"	4:12
12.	"Draw Near"	4:05
13.	"October" (Nathan)	4:24
14.	"Your Voice"	1:17
Total length:		54:46

== Charts ==
Chart (2012)	Peak position
US Billboard Christian Albums	50
US Billboard Heatseekers Albums	45
