= Sinking the Eight Ball =

Studio album by Ruby Joe
- Released: 23 September 1997
- Genre: Psychobilly
- Length: 38:02
- Label: Sub•Lime Records
- Producers: Mike Knott; Gene Eugene

Ruby Joe chronology
Sinking the Eight Ball (1997)	Hot Rod Deluxe (1999)

Professional ratings
Review scores
Source	Rating
Cross Rhythms	
Cool Fools	
The Lighthouse	
Youthworker	
CCM Magazine	
7ball	
CBA Marketplace	

Sinking the Eight Ball is the debut album by Ruby Joe. Due to its topical content, the album was pulled from some Christian book stores.

The album drew upon the production talents of Mike Knott and Gene Eugene. On this release the band has a rockabilly sound, somewhere between the Stray Cats and The Reverend Horton Heat, or "like a rockabilly version of Mike Knott..." Lyrically the album addressed hard issues such as racism ("Skin"), the underground church in China ("People Underground"), materialism and temptation ("Fat Cat"), New Age spiritualism ("Rock 'n' Roll & My Baby"), and internal spiritual battles with our sinful nature.

In "Spiritual Heroin" Russinger deals with his own former speed addiction, describing how Christ can fill the need created by addictions, which one reviewer described as a "slightly disturbing metaphor." The album also deals with the victims of the Holocaust ("Death Train"), and finally closes with "Let's Go", a "no holds barred celebration of salvation."

One reviewer found the album to be on various tracks "cliché-ridden but vaguely worshipful", "weakly inspiring", and "shallow & dumb." The reviewer went on to state that the attempt "to bring 1950s wholesomeness into today's moral morass" fell flat.

== Track listing ==
All lyrics by Greg Russinger. All music by Greg Russinger, Joe Baugh, Christina Hock and Amber Reeves.

No.	Title	Length
1.	"Skin"	2:44
2.	"Within"	3:00
3.	"Childhood Love Song"	3:02
4.	"Death Train"	4:13
5.	"Fat Cat"	2:37
6.	"Rock 'n' Roll & My Baby"	3:04
7.	"Spiritual Heroin"	3:08
8.	"Rocket Ship"	3:50
9.	"Studio No. 5"	2:12
10.	"People Underground"	3:22
11.	"Tongue Is Numb"	3:14
12.	"Let's Go"	3:36
Total length:		38:02
