= Matt Bronleewe =

- Born: Matthew Ryan Bronleewe; December 13, 1973 (age 52); Dallas, Texas, U.S.
- Genres: Alternative rock; folk; Christian
- Occupations: Producer; songwriter; session musician; novelist
- Instruments: Guitar; vocals; percussion; piano
- Years active: 1993–present
- Website: www.mattbronleewe.com

Matthew Ryan Bronleewe (born December 13, 1973) is an American record producer, musician, novelist and songwriter.

== Biography ==
Matt Bronleewe was born on December 13, 1973, in Dallas, Texas. As a boy, he moved to central Kansas, Lorraine, with his family so his father could take on the family farm, where he was raised with his two younger sisters. The family moved onto the farmstead a few years later and Bronleewe lived there until he graduated from Quivira Heights High School in 1992.

Bronleewe studied music at Greenville College in the town of Greenville, Illinois, where he met Dan Haseltine, Charlie Lowell and Stephen Mason. Together the four formed the group Jars of Clay, named after a verse in the Bible. The group began performing around their college and later recorded their debut demo album, Frail. Following the demo's release, the group's fame spread, and they were approached by Christian record label Essential Records to record a full-length studio album. At this time, the group had not completed their studies. Bronleewe decided to stay behind to finish school, while the rest of the band members decided to accept the recording offer. Bronleewe left the group and Lowell suggested his New York-based friend Matt Odmark to take Bronleewe's place.

Bronleewe was married in August 1994 and lived for one year in Sterling, Illinois where he continued to work on his studies.

In the summer of 1995, he was invited to reenter the world of music when another Greenville College student, Sarah Jahn, invited him to play guitar for an independent CD she was recording, and later asked him to play guitar for her full-time. Bronleewe moved to Nashville, Tennessee, and played with Jahn as well as pursuing other avenues of song writing and record production. Bronleewe had become known as a previous member of Jars of Clay as the group had rightly credited him as a co-songwriter for several songs from their album, which had gone platinum. With this, Bronleewe worked with several musical artists, most notably producing the debut album by Plumb, for which Jars of Clay member Haseltine co-wrote the song "Concrete" with Bronleewe and Tiffany Arbuckle (the lead singer of Plumb). Following this successful release, Bronleewe collaborated with Christian singer-songwriter Chris Tomlin, with whom he was nominated for a 2003 GMA Dove Award.

Bronleewe continues to collaborate with various musicians in the American Christian music scene such as Michael W. Smith, Stephen Curtis Chapman, Kari Jobe, and Leeland. Outside of this genre, Bronleewe has worked with artists such as Australian Natalie Imbruglia, actress Hayden Panettiere, former Tonic frontman Emerson Hart and American Idol finalist Kimberley Locke.

After building a name for himself in the music industry, Bronleewe turned to the literary world. In August 2007, he released his first book, Illuminated. The thriller conspiracy novel has been likened to stories such as The Da Vinci Code and National Treasure. The book is the first in a five-part series published by Thomas Nelson Fiction. House of Wolves, the second book in the series, was released August 12, 2008.

Bronleewe also co-wrote the song "For the Love of God" with Rebecca St. James; it appears on her 2000 release, Transform.

From 2005 to 2007, he blogged for the e-zine Infuze Magazine, until the website closed in early 2008.

In 2009, Bronleewe joined Dan Haseltine and Jeremy Bose to form a new band, The Hawk in Paris. The band released a seven-song EP, His+Hers, in 2011, filled with melancholy love songs reminiscent of 80s synth-pop groups like Depeche Mode and Pet Shop Boys. In 2012, The Hawk in Paris released a three-song EP, Freaks.

== Personal life ==
Bronleewe was born in Dallas, Texas, and raised on a farm in Kansas until moving to Greenville, Illinois, to attend Greenville College in 1992. He currently resides in Nashville, Tennessee, with his wife and three children.
