= Hot Rod Deluxe =

Studio album by Ruby Joe
- Released: 1999
- Genres: Rockabilly, swing revival
- Label: Sub•Lime
- Producer: Billy Zoom

Ruby Joe chronology
| Sinking the Eight Ball (1998) | Hot Rod Deluxe (1999) |

Professional ratings
Review scores
| Source | Rating |
|---|---|
| Cross Rhythms | (not rated) |
| Jesus Freak Hideout | (not rated) |
| Exit Zine | (not rated) |
| The Phantom Tollbooth | (not rated) |
| YouthWorker | (not rated) |

Hot Rod Deluxe is the second album released by Ruby Joe. This effort was produced by Billy Zoom (of X) and joined by the horn section of Royal Crown Revue, including Bill Ungerman, Mando Dorame, and Scotty Steen. Musically the album shifts from the rockabilly roots of the debut toward swing revival. This release is generally considered to be their better effort, more focused than their debut. The lyrics also shift in attitude from their first album; on Hot Rod Deluxe it became "easier to see the biblical point" that is being made. The liner notes also contain the direct references for each song.

== Track listing ==
1. "Foo Foo Flirt"
2. "John 17"
3. "O My Soul"
4. "Flames"
5. "Self-Righteous Stomp"
6. "Loaded Gun"
7. "Ambers Song"
8. "Fast Lane Sinner"
9. "Little Angel"
10. "Last Chance Johnny"
11. "Hot Rod"
12. "Get It Right"
