= God or the Girl =

American television series

God Or The Girl is a five-part miniseries run by the television channel A&E in spring of 2006. It chronicled the lives of four young men, Joe, Dan, Mike, and Steve, who were considering the Catholic Priesthood. Each of them did something to try to help them make their decision: Joe hitchhiked to Niagara Falls, Dan carried an eighty-pound cross, Mike went to a Christian retreat center, and Steve traveled to Guatemala to do missionary work. The series ended with only Steve deciding to pursue the priesthood by entering the seminary. However, two of them incorporated religion into their lives, as Joe became a lay minister, and Dan became a youth minister. Mike took the teaching position he was offered. Steve has left the seminary and is now married.

The show used "Flood" as its theme song, written and performed by Christian rock band Jars of Clay.
