= Tal & Acacia =

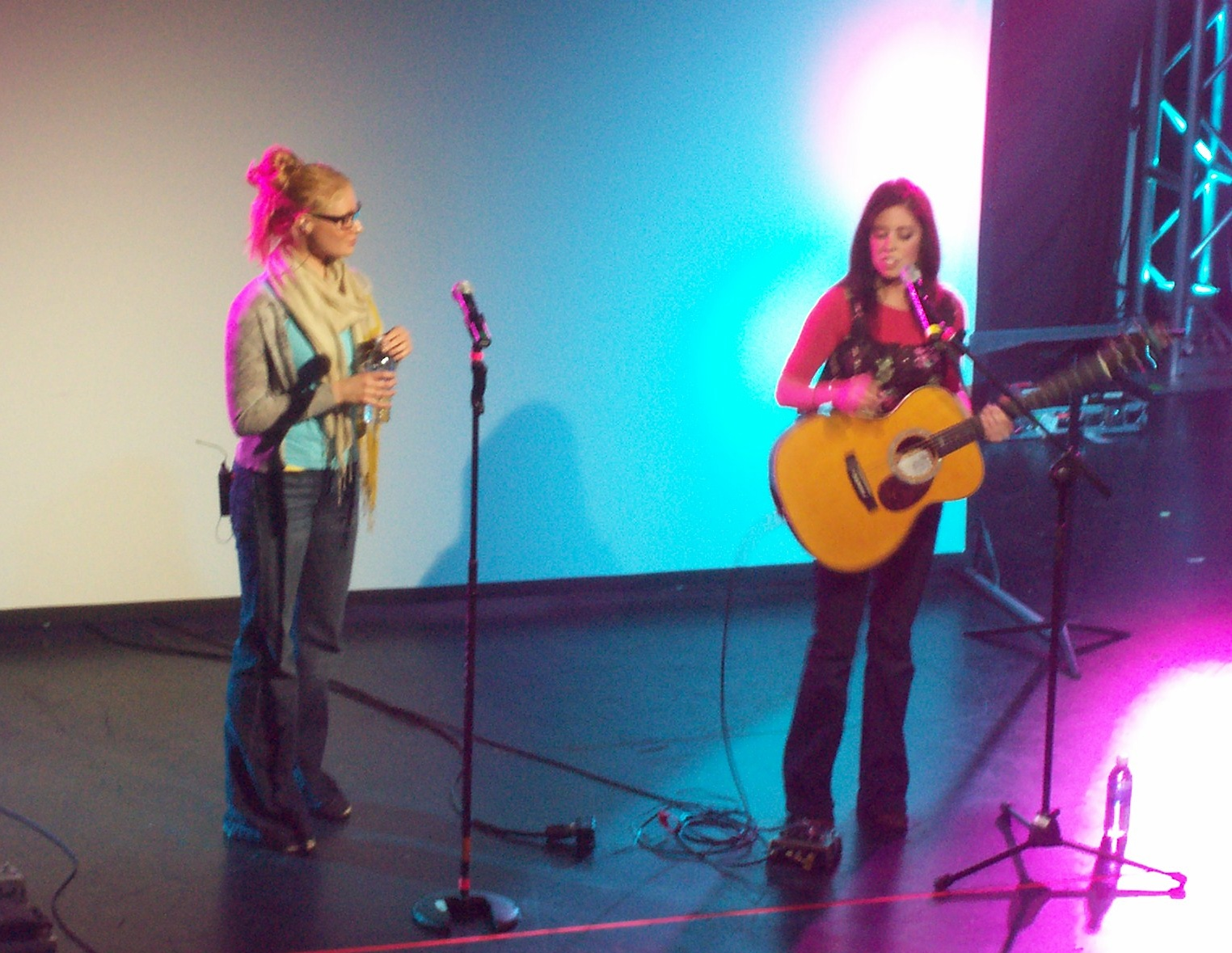
Performing on the opening night of the Hey! Hey! (That's Freedom You Hear) tour

Tal & Acacia is an American contemporary Christian musical duo from Portland, Maine. The sisters are signed to Essential Records, and first received national attention when their song "Clearview" was released as an iTunes Discovery Download of the week in October 2009. Their debut album, Wake Me, was released on October 6, 2009. The songs "Garbage In" and "Yahweh" were released as singles on June 19, 2009. Tal & Acacia's musical style has been compared to Norah Jones, Feist, Ingrid Michaelson, and Imogen Heap. The duo toured with Superchick in 2009 on the band's national "Hey Hey (That's Freedom You Hear)" Tour.

== Discography ==
=== Studio albums ===
Title	Details
Wake Me	Released: October 6, 2009; Label: Essential Records • Sony; Formats: CD, digital download, streaming
Black and White	Released: February 26, 2013; Label: Independent; Formats: CD, digital download, streaming, LP
