= Mackinac Island Press =

American children's book publisher

- Headquarters: Traverse City, Michigan, United States
- Website: mackinacislandpress.com

Mackinac Island Press is an American publisher of children's books based in Michigan.

== History ==
Mackinac Island Press's first book was Has Anyone Seen Christmas?. The book was featured across the country by Barnes & Noble and featured on Fox & Friends morning show, the Chicago Tribune, Associated Press and other media outlets. The book has been turned into a float for America's Thanksgiving Day Parade. Negotiations began with Disney and other film companies to take the book to the big screen.

In 2006, they released Gitchi Gumee, based on Henry Wadsworth Longfellow's poem, which won the Midwest Booksellers Association Children's Picture Book of the Year Honor Book Award. That year, they acquired rights to the Buck Wilder property and released their first Buck Wilder Adventure chapter books for children, and the PaleoJoe Dinosaur Detective Club series.

In 2007, The chapter books series expanded with additional books, and the company introduced a new series, Adventures of Pachelot, by emerging writer Wendy Caszatt-Allen. The first volume in the series, Last Voyage of the Griffon, had its film rights optioned by Brauer Productions. That year, the company also brought on A Crazy Little Series, a line of books by dollmaker, artist and author, Tracy Gallup. The series premiered with Stone Crazy, Shell Crazy, Tree Crazy and Snow Crazy, with the illustrations in the book being Gallup's handmade dolls.

In fall 2007, Mackinac Island Press released Magnificent Me, a book by Dan Haseltine, lead singer of Jars of Clay, with Michigan illustration Joel Schoon Tanis.

In 2008, the company released 'Twas the Night Before Summer by Anne Margaret Lewis (Has Anyone Seen Christmas?), which was featured by libraries and bookstores across the United States.

Mackinac Island Press sold its backlist to Charlesbridge Publishing in the fall of 2009, while simultaneously licensing Printoons—an arts and crafts line that is being compared to Crayola. The non-religious rights for Printoons went to Colorbok (Wal-Mart's 2008 Vendor of the Year) and religious rights went to Thomas Nelson (the largest religious publisher in the world). Printoons products are released in spring and summer 2010. Television and clothing licenses are being worked on.

MIP also sold individual books to large New York publishers, including HarperCollins.
