= The Royal Royal =

- Origin: Ontario, Canada
- Genres: Christian worship, acoustic, pop rock
- Years active: 2011–present
- Label: Essential
- Members: Gabriel Finochio; Nathan Finochio
- Website: theroyalroyal.com

The Royal Royal is a Canadian-Christian contemporary worship music duo originating from Ontario, Canada. It is made up of two brothers, Gabriel and Nathan Finochio. The duo was active as of 2011 and is with Essential Records.

== Music ==
The band has released two EPs to date (Praise Him EP and Royal EP). It released its first studio album, The Royalty, on November 6, 2012, through Essential Records. They released their second album, The Return of the King, in 2014.

== Discography ==
| Year | Album | Peak chart positions | |
| Year | Album | Top Christian | Top Heatseekers |
|---|---|---|---|
| 2012 | The Royalty: Released: November 6, 2012; Label: Essential; Format: CD, Digital download | 50 | 45 |
