= Ruby Joe =

American Christian band

- Ruby Joe c. 1998

Background information
- Origin: Huntington Beach, California
- Genres: Psychobilly; rockabilly; swing revival
- Years active: 1997–1999
- Label: Sub•Lime
- Past members: Joe Baugh; Christina Hock; Amber Reeves; Greg Russinger

Ruby Joe was a Christian band from Ventura, California. Their debut album was cited as psychobilly, but their second played squarely as swing revival due to the appearance of the horn section of Royal Crown Revue. Both were released on Sub•Lime Records, in 1998 and 1999. The band's name is a combination of the founder's name and that of Ruby's Diner in Huntington Beach, where the band was formed.

== Background ==
Prior to Ruby Joe, Greg Russinger and Joe Baugh played in a band called Strugglefish. Russinger was a youth pastor at Horizon Foursquare Church, Ventura, CA. In 1996 the band gained the bass talents of Amber Reeves and the drumming of Christina Hock, forming an all-female rhythm section. Ruby Joe's debut release, Sinking the Eight Ball (1998), drew upon the production talents of Mike Knott and Gene Eugene. The band's sound wound up being somewhere between the Stray Cats and The Reverend Horton Heat, or "like a rockabilly version of Mike Knott..." Russinger wrote most of the lyrics, addressing issues such as racism, the underground church in China, materialism, temptation, and human's internal spiritual battles with their sinful nature.

Not all content was well received; three tracks in particular caused the band trouble. "Rock 'n' Roll & My Baby", which deal with New Age spiritualism, and "Death Train", dealing with the victims of the Holocaust. Finally Russinger dealt with his own former speed addiction in "Spiritual Heroin", describing how Christ can fill the need created by addictions, which one reviewer described as a "slightly disturbing metaphor." All of this led to trouble with the Christian music establishment; the album was pulled from some Christian book stores and the band disallowed from playing at a Christian music festival.

On their second release, Hot Rod Deluxe (1999), the band added elements of swing revival, leading one reviewer to refer to it as "swingabilly". This effort was produced by Billy Zoom (of X) and joined by the horn section of Royal Crown Revue, including Bill Ungerman, Mando Dorame, and Scotty Steen. This release is generally considered to be their better effort, more focused than their debut. The lyrics also shift in attitude from their first album; on Hot Rod Deluxe it became "easier to see the biblical point" that is trying to be made.

The band also appeared on the 1999 Jackson Rubio various artists compilation Jackson/Rubio's Rockabilly and Western Gospel Hymns. This album contained reworked spirituals and standard hymns such as "Amazing Grace"; Ruby Joe provided renditions of "Joshua Fit the Battle of Jericho" and "Walk Dem Golden Stairs". Reviews of the band's performance were mixed; One reviewer called the band's cuts "standouts", while another stated that their rendition of "Joshua" "grows fairly long in the tooth by the song's end and easily pales in comparison to, say, Elvis' more passionate and varied arrangement from his gospel magnum opus His Hand in Mine." Russinger later provided lead vocals on the Scott Blackwell produced album Punk Praise Volume 1 (2001, Abundant Praise records). The disc featured musicians from worship teams around Southern California.

== Members ==
- Joe Baugh
- Christina Hock – drums
- Amber Reeves – bass
- Greg Russinger – lead vocalist and guitarist

== Discography ==
- 1997: Year After Year (EP, independent)
- 1998: Sinking the Eight Ball
- 1999: Hot Rod Deluxe
