= The Shelter (album) =

Studio album by Jars of Clay
- Released: October 5, 2010
- Genre: Rock, CCM
- Length: 48:41
- Label: Gray Matters, Essential

Jars of Clay chronology
The Long Fall Back to Earth (2009)	The Shelter (2010)	Inland (2013)

Singles from The Shelter
- 1. "Out of My Hands" Released: 23 August 2010

Professional ratings
Review scores
Source	Rating
AllMusic	3.5/5 stars
Christian Music Zine	4.5/5 stars
Christianity Today	4/5 stars
Cross Rhythms	10/10 stars
Jesus Freak Hideout	4.5/5 stars

Jars of Clay presents The Shelter is the tenth full-length studio album by rock band Jars of Clay, released October 5, 2010, through Gray Matters Records.

== Overview ==
The Shelter is described as a collection of songs about community, the title of which was taken from the old Irish Proverb "It is in the shelter of each other that the people live." Shelter features appearances from 15 artists including Amy Grant, Derek Webb, Mac Powell, Mike Donehey, Sara Groves, David Crowder, Brandon Heath, and Audrey Assad.

The album's lead single "Out of My Hands" was made available as a free download on the band's official website in August 2010. It features vocal contributions from Mike Donehey of Tenth Avenue North and Leigh Nash of Sixpence None the Richer. The single peaked at No. 27 on Billboard's Christian Songs chart on September 25, 2010.

CBN writes in their review of the album: "The ultimate strength of The Shelter lies not in its all-star cast or even stellar production. It's in the songwriting. Each and every song contains a penetrating spiritual truth that points the listener vertically toward worship. This might be Jars of Clay's best album since their Grammy winner, The Eleventh Hour."—CBN.com

== Track listing ==
Album release
No.	Title	Length
1.	"Small Rebellions" (featuring Brandon Heath)	4:48
2.	"Call My Name" (featuring Thad Cockrell, Audrey Assad)	4:08
3.	"We Will Follow" (featuring Gungor)	4:09
4.	"Eyes Wide Open" (featuring Mac Powell (of Third Day), Derek Webb, Burlap to Cashmere)	4:28
5.	"Shelter" (featuring Brandon Heath, Audrey Assad, Toby Mac)	4:50
6.	"Out of My Hands" (featuring Mike Donehey (of Tenth Avenue North), Leigh Nash)	4:14
7.	"No Greater Love"	4:07
8.	"Run in the Night (Psalm 27)" (featuring Thad Cockrell)	5:25
9.	"Lay it Down" (featuring David Crowder, Dawn Michele (of Fireflight)	4:03
10.	"Love Will Find Us" (featuring Sara Groves, Matt Maher)	5:45
11.	"Benediction" (featuring Amy Grant)	2:52
Total length:		48:39

== Credits ==
- Produced by Jars of Clay
- Executive Producer: Terry Hemmings
- A&R: Jordyn Thomas
- Recorded at Sputnik Sound, Nashville, TN
- Engineered by Mitch Dane, Assisted by Joshua Niles
- Recorded at Gray Matters, Nashville, TN
- Engineered by Mike Odmark
- Amy Grant vox recorded by Mitch Dane (assisted by Drew Bollman)
- Mac Powell vox recorded by Andy Hunt
- Sara Groves vox recorded by Ben Gowell
- Toby Mac vox recorded by Chris Stevens
- Mixed by Jay Ruston
- Mastered by Stephen Marsh, LA

All songs written by Jars of Clay except:

- Out Of My Hands written by Jars of Clay, Gabe Ruschival, and Jeremy Lutito
- Eyes Wide Open written by Jars of Clay and Phillip LaRue
- Run In The Night written by Jars of Clay and Thad Cockrell
- No Greater Love written by Jars of Clay, Laura Story, Gabe Ruschival, Jeremy Lutito and David Crowder
- Lay It Down written by Sara Groves, Ben Gowell and Aaron Fabrini

Performed by Jars of Clay, with the following:

- Gabe Ruschival played bass on We Will Follow, Out Of My Hands, Love Will Find Us, Shelter, Lay It Down, Call My Name, No Greater Love.
- Jeremy Lutito played drums on We Will Follow, Out Of My Hands, Love Will Find Us, Shelter, Small Rebellions, Lay It Down, Call My Name, No Greater Love.
- Jake Goss played drums on Eyes Wide Open, Run In the Night, Love Will Find Us.
- Brother Henry played strings on We Will Follow.
- BGVs on Shelter by Toby Mac and Audrey Assad
- BGVs on Out Of My Hands by Leigh Nash
- Photography: Victor Huckabee
- Grooming: Jordan Byers
- Wardrobe: Talitha Sha Moak
- Design: Tim Parker
- Art Direction: Jars of Clay, Beth Lee, Tim Parker
- A&R Production: Michelle Box

== Awards ==
The album was nominated for two Dove Award: Pop/Contemporary Album of the Year and Praise & Worship Album of the Year, at the 42nd GMA Dove Awards.
