= Closer (Jars of Clay EP) =

Closer EP

EP by Jars of Clay
- Released: July 29, 2008
- Recorded: 2008
- Genres: Rock; Christian rock
- Length: 21:06
- Labels: Gray Matters; Nettwerk
- Producer: Jars of Clay

Jars of Clay chronology
Greatest Hits (2008)	Closer EP (2008)	The Long Fall Back to Earth (2009)

Singles from Closer EP
- 1. "Closer" Released: July 8, 2008

Professional ratings
Review scores
Source	Rating
AbsolutePunk.net	(56%)
Christianity Today	3/5 stars
Jesus Freak Hideout	4.5/5 stars

Closer is an EP by the American Christian rock band Jars of Clay. It was released in digital download format on July 29, 2008, and in CD format on August 19, 2008. The only radio single released off the EP is the title track, although the new recording of "Love Song for a Savior" has been known to be played by radio stations in place of the original single. Both "Closer" and "Safe to Land" would later appear on the band's 2009 album The Long Fall Back to Earth, but the version of "Closer" is a slightly different mix than the original version from the EP. The song "Prisoner of Hope" is a track from the soundtrack to the film Sons of Lwala.

== Track listing ==
1. "Closer" – 3:39
2. "Safe to Land" – 4:47
3. "Love Song for a Savior" – 4:54
4. "Flood (New Rain)" – 3:42
5. "Prisoner of Hope" – 4:04
