= Drummer Boy (EP) =

EP by Jars of Clay
- Released: 1995
- Genre: Christian rock; folk rock
- Length: 17:39
- Label: Essential (1995); Silvertone (1997 re-release)

Jars of Clay chronology
Jars of Clay (1995)	Drummer Boy (1995)	Much Afraid (1997)

Professional ratings
Review scores
Source	Rating
Allmusic	2/5 stars

For the Christmas Carol, see Little Drummer Boy.

Drummer Boy is an EP release by Christian folk group Jars of Clay featuring a new interpretation of the classic 1958 Christmas Carol "Little Drummer Boy". The EP was originally released by Essential Records in the Christmas following the release of Jars Of Clay in 1995. The EP was re-released as a two-pack with Jars of Clay prior to their second album, Much Afraid.

== Track listings ==
=== 1995 release ===
1. "Little Drummer Boy" (Katherine K. Davis, Henry Onorati, Harry Simeone) – 4:23
2. "God Rest Ye Merry Gentlemen" (Unknown) – 3:03
3. "He" (Acoustic Version) (Charlie Lowell, Dan Haseltine, Matt Odmark, Stephen Mason, Matt Bronlewee) – 5:25
4. "The Little Drummer Boy" (Grinch Mix) (Katherine K. Davis, Henry Onorati, Harry Simeone) – 4:53

=== 1997 release ===
1. "The Little Drummer Boy" (Katherine K. Davis, Henry Onorati, Harry Simeone)
2. "The Little Drummer Boy" (Grinch Mix) (Katherine K. Davis, Henry Onorati, Harry Simeone)
3. "Blind" (Fluffy Sav Mix) (Charlie Lowell, Dan Haseltine, Matt Odmark, Stephen Mason)
4. "Wicker Baskets" (Original instrumental piece) (Charlie Lowell, Dan Haseltine, Matt Odmark, Stephen Mason)

== Personnel ==
- Robert Beeson – producer, executive producer, art direction, design
- Matt Bronleewe – arranger
- John Catchings – cello
- Keith Compton – mixing
- Tom Coyne – mastering
- Dan Haseltine – producer
- David Hoffner – hammered dulcimer
- Scott Hughes – art direction, design
- Jars of Clay – arranger, producer
- J.B. – mixing
- Mancy A'lan Kane – backing vocals
- Steve Lipson – producer
- Charlie Lowell – producer
- Stephen Mason – producer
- Heff Moraes – engineer, mixing
- Matt Odmark – producer
- Tamara Reynolds – photography
- Doug Sarrett – assistant engineer, assistant
- Jeff Savage – producer, drum programming
- Scott Savage – conga, snare drum, rainstick, shaker, laughs
- Rocky Schnaars – engineer
- Matt Stanfield – producer, drum programming
- Jackie Street – fretless bass
- Bobby G. Taylor – oboe
- Jim Widen – assistant engineer
- Jason Wilder – mixing assistant
- Jonathan Yudkin – mandolin, violin
