= Stephen Mason (musician) =

American musician (born 1975)

Steve Mason
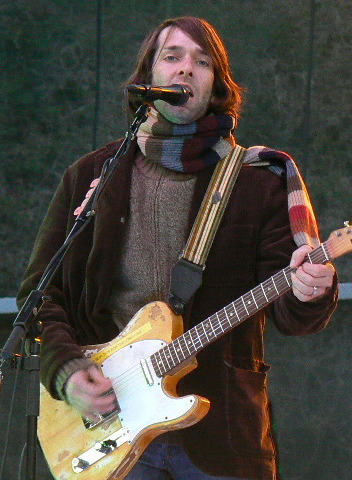

Background information
- Born: Stephen Daniel Mason; July 8, 1975 (age 51); Joliet, Illinois, U.S.
- Genres: Alternative rock; folk; Christian
- Occupations: Musician; songwriter
- Instruments: Guitar; vocals; bass; mandolin
- Years active: 1993–present
- Labels: Essential; Silvertone; Gray Matters; Nettwerk

Stephen Daniel Mason (born July 8, 1975) is an American musician best known as the lead guitarist for Christian alternative folk rock group Jars of Clay.

== Early life and education ==
Mason was born in Joliet, Illinois in 1975, however was brought up from age 8 in Decatur, Illinois, where he attended Warrensburg-Latham schools.

== Career ==
Mason joined Jars of Clay as a founding member in 1993 with singer Dan Haseltine and pianist Charlie Lowell while studying at Greenville College in his home state of Illinois. As a submission piece to get into college, Mason wrote an instrumental guitar piece entitled "Frail" which was later recorded and used as the namesake for the group's first demo Frail. The song later had lyrics added by Jars of Clay's lead singer Dan Haseltine for the group's second album Much Afraid.

In 2014, Stephen qualified as a Master Barber and has started cutting hair at his shop, The Handsomizer.

== Personal life ==
Mason married Melissa Mason in late 90s and has two children. He left Melissa in 2009 to marry former BBC Radio producer Jude Adam on October 24, 2009.

Mason is a supporter of Major League Soccer team Nashville SC and regularly attends home games in a Moses-inspired costume.

== Guitars, amps, and pedals ==
Mason uses a range of different guitars for performing with Jars of Clay, both electric and acoustic. Some of them he uses exclusively in the studio and others exclusively for live performances.

- "Grand Auditorium" Taylor twelve string guitar
- Gibson "Tal Farlow" series
- Baby Taylor guitar
- Martin Backpacker travel guitar
- Gibson "Chet Atkins" series
- Fender Telecaster
- Gibson Les Paul
- Matchless Chief Guitar Amp
- Vox AC-30

As for pedals, over the years Mason has been seen using a Boss Tuner, Visual Sound Jekyll & Hyde, Swell Pedals G-TOD, Tonephile Puredrive, Electro-Harmonix Deluxe Memory Man, DMB Pedals, and a Pedaltrain pedalboard.
