= Dan Haseltine =

American singer (born 1973)

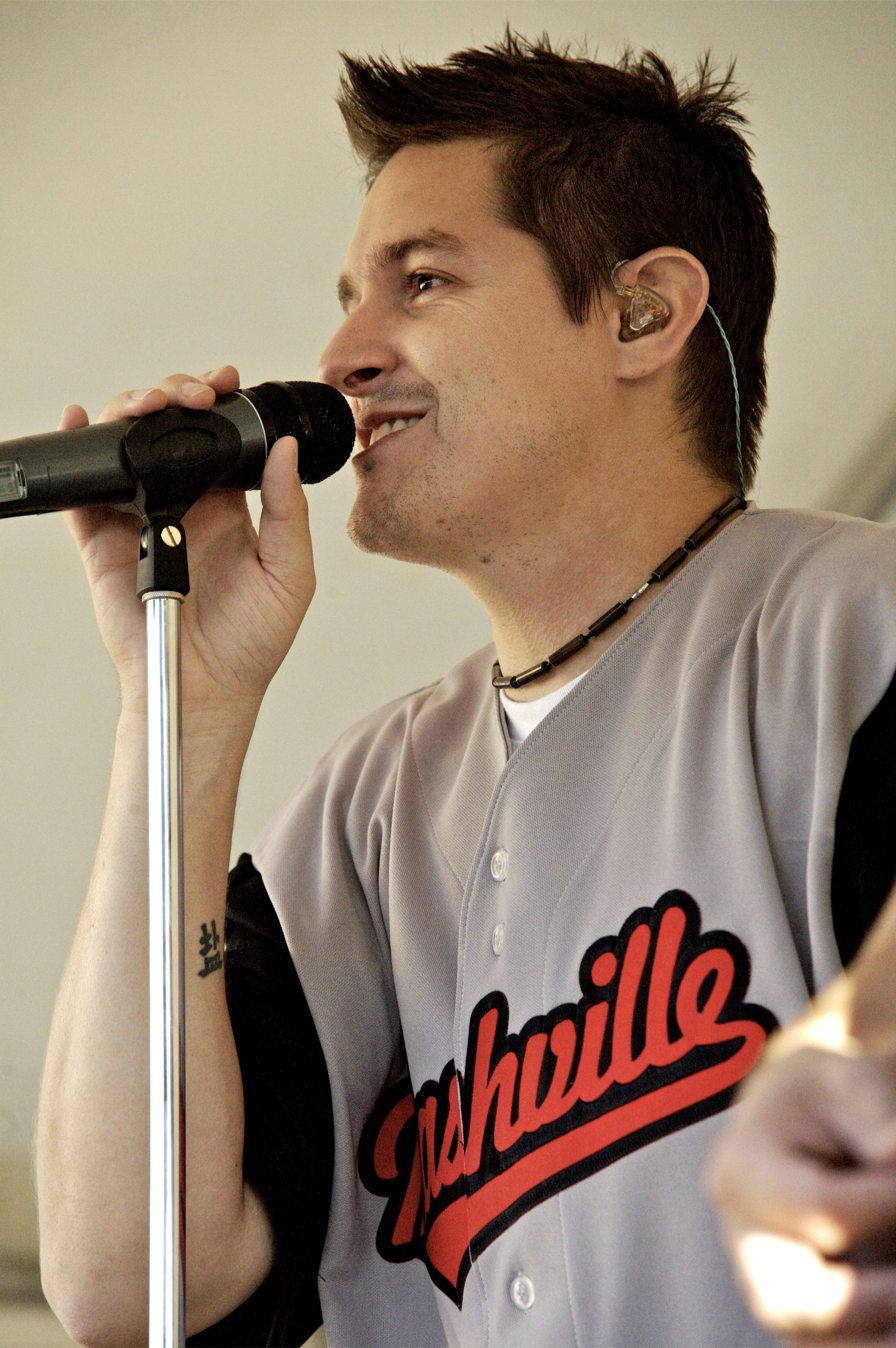
- Haseltine in 2008

Background information
- Born: Daniel Paul Haseltine; January 12, 1973 (age 53); Hampden, Massachusetts, U.S.
- Genres: Alternative rock; folk; Christian
- Occupations: Singer; songwriter
- Instruments: Vocals; drums; percussion; piano; accordion; melodica
- Years active: 1993–present
- Formerly of: Jars of Clay

Daniel Paul Haseltine (born January 12, 1973) is an American singer best known as lead vocalist for Christian alternative folk rock group Jars of Clay. He has played drums, piano, accordion, percussion and melodica while with Jars of Clay. He has had different artistic titles, including songwriter, producer, film composer, music supervisor and art designer.

Haseltine is also the founder of the non-profit organization Blood:Water Mission, where he currently sits as part of the board of directors. He is a regular writer and speaker about worship music, HIV/AIDS in Africa, social justice and church reform. Haseltine is also a regular columnist for Relevant Magazine, and has contributed articles to Moody, CCM Magazine, Christianity Today, World Vision, Campus Life and Beliefnet.

== Biography ==
Haseltine attended Greenville College, where he was noticed by fellow student Charlie Lowell while wearing a Toad the Wet Sprocket T-shirt at a local concert. The two became friends and began Jars of Clay with guitarist Stephen Mason. Later, they enlisted guitarist Matt Bronleewe, who was with the group for a short while but decided to complete his studies when the rest of the group left in 1995 before graduation. He was replaced by Matthew Odmark from Rochester, New York.

In 2001, Haseltine and the rest of Jars of Clay were awarded honorary graduations from Greenville College due to their demonstrated understanding of their craft. Haseltine has collaborated with other artists and authors in books such as "The Revolution: A Field Manual for Changing Your World" (2006) and "I.Am.Relevant: A Generation Impacting Their World With Faith" (2002).

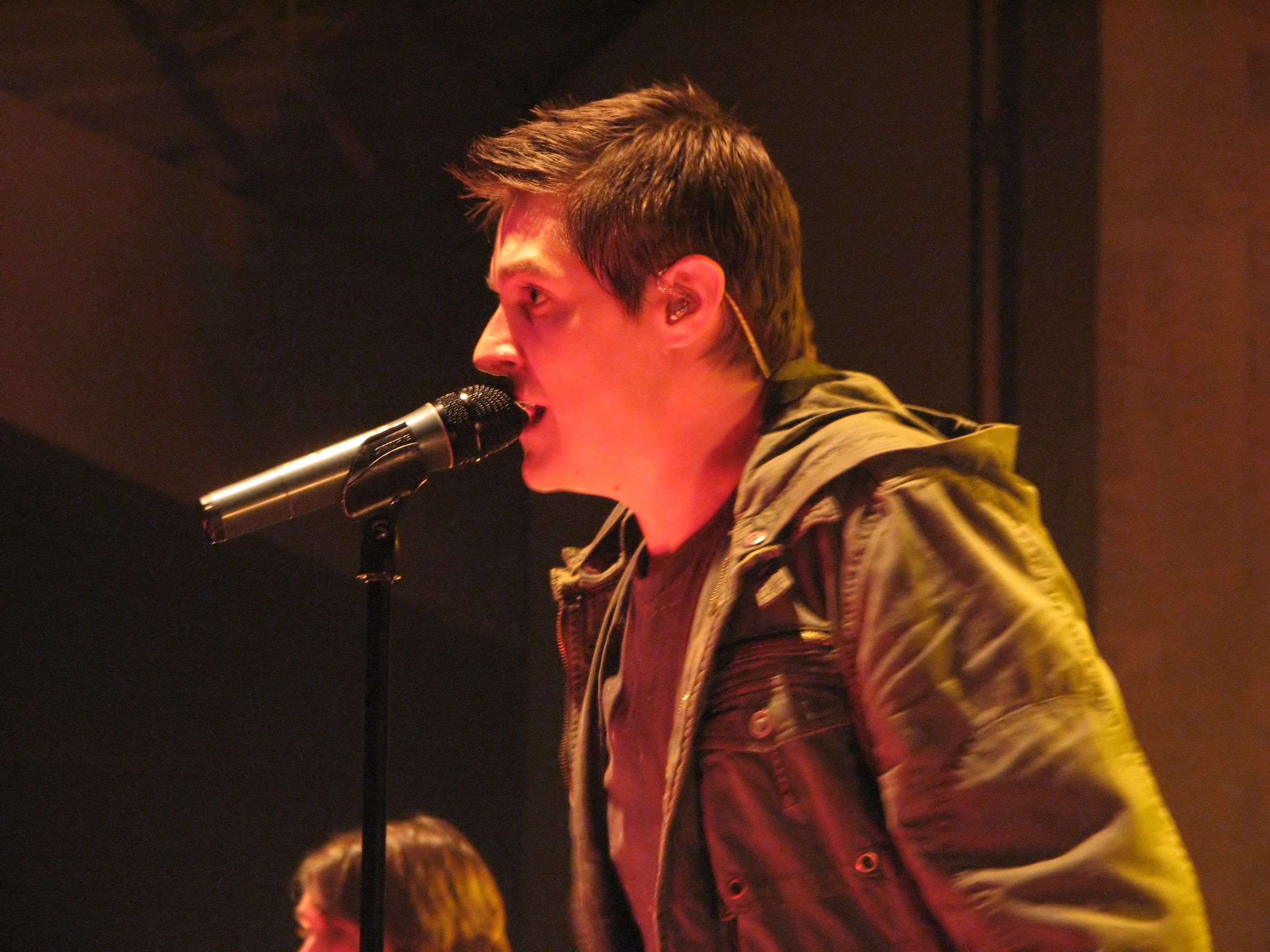
Haseltine in 2007

In 2007, Haseltine released his first children's book entitled, "The One, the Only Magnificent Me". The book features artwork by illustrator Joel Schoon Tanis and will be published by Mackinac Island Press, Inc. The book was named a CMSpin bestseller on 2007-09-12. Haseltine was featured on the 2011 Plumb song "Drifting". The song peaked at No. 36 on the Billboard Hot Christian Songs chart.

In 2012, Haseltine released an EP called His + Hers along with Jeremy Bose and Matt Bronleewe as The Hawk in Paris. A full-length album was expected to be released in 2013.

In 2019, Haseltine and Matthew S. Nelson composed the soundtrack for The Chosen, including the theme song "Walk on the Water" (featuring Ruby Amanfu).

== Personal life ==
He is married to Erin Haseltine and is the father of two children, Noah and Max.

He attends an Anglican church in Nashville, Tennessee.

== Solo discography ==
=== Compilation contributions ===
Released	Song	Album	Label(s)
October 12, 2010	"Can't Save You"	Music from the film What If...	Essential Records
September 23, 2011	"Empty (Disciples)" (with Matt Hammitt)	Music Inspired by The Story	EMI Christian Music
