= Charlie Lowell =

American pianist (born 1973)

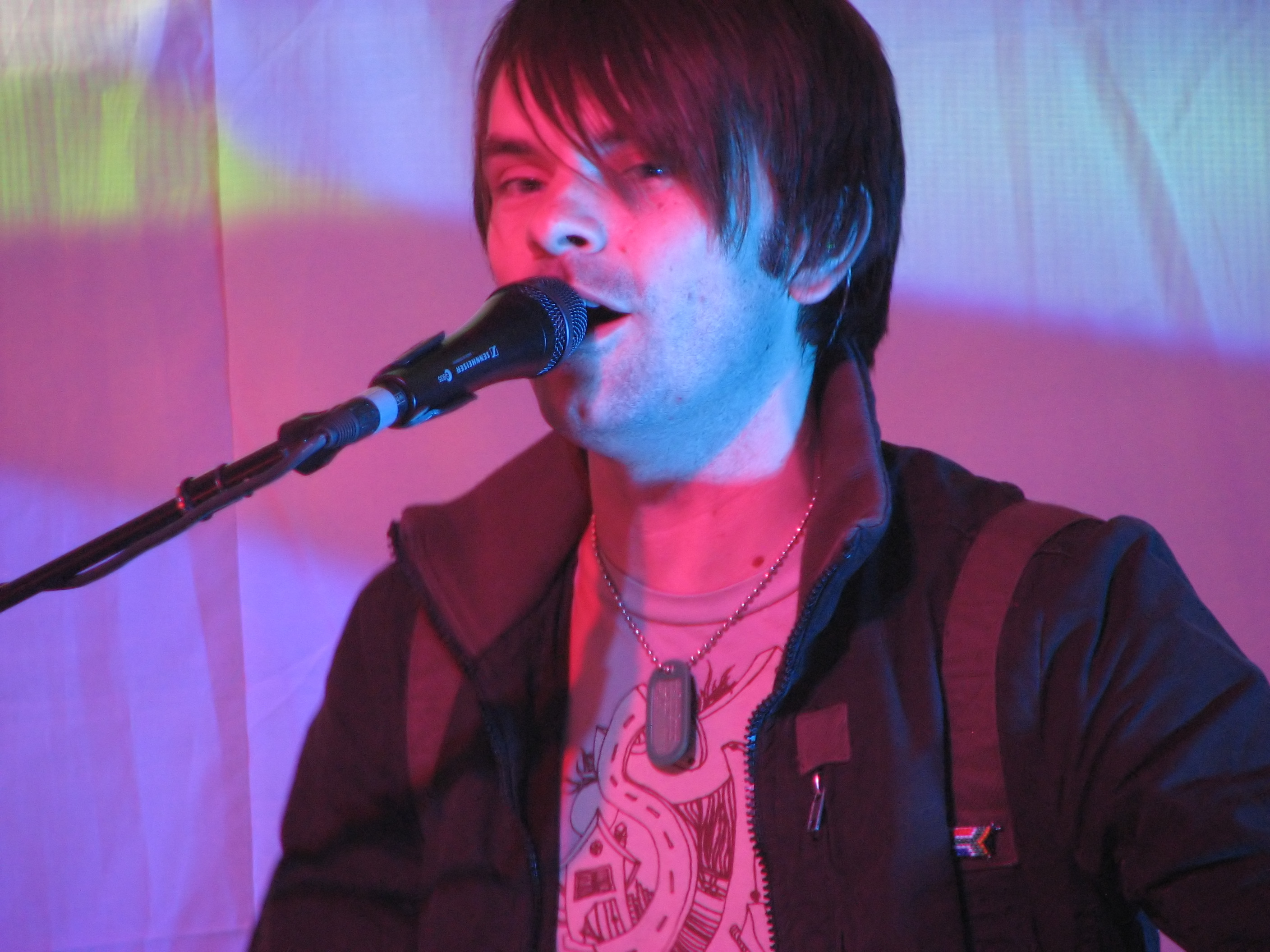
- Lowell in 2007

Background information
- Born: Charles Daniel Lowell; October 21, 1973 (age 52); Rochester, New York, U.S.
- Genres: Alternative rock; folk; Christian
- Occupations: Musician; songwriter
- Instruments: Keyboards; accordion; vocals
- Years active: 1993–present
- Labels: Essential; Silvertone; Gray Matters; Nettwerk

Charles Daniel Lowell (born October 21, 1973) is an American pianist most known for being the pianist and keyboardist for Christian alternative folk rock group Jars of Clay.

== Biography ==
Lowell was raised in Rochester, New York, where he attended McQuaid Jesuit High School. Lowell attended Greenville College as a musical studies major. While there, Lowell spotted another student wearing a T-shirt for the band Toad the Wet Sprocket. He introduced himself to this man whose name was Dan Haseltine, who was also studying music at Greenville. The two began making music with guitarist Steve Mason and eventually formed the band Jars of Clay.

The group added a fourth member, Matt Bronleewe, after a short while, as an additional guitarist. The group recorded an EP entitled Frail in 1994. As the EP gained momentum, the group decided to leave college without graduating to pursue their musical career. As Bronleewe wanted to complete his education, he left the band. Lowell then recruited his friend and McQuaid High School classmate Matt Odmark as the new guitarist. While different drummers and bassists have rotated in and out, Haseltine, Lowell, Mason, and Odmark have remained the four members of Jars of Clay.

In 2001, Lowell and the rest of Jars of Clay were awarded honorary graduations from Greenville College due to their demonstrated understanding of their craft.

Also of note, Lowell is a descendant of Mayflower Pilgrims Myles Standish and John Alden.
