= Jars of Clay =

American Christian rock band

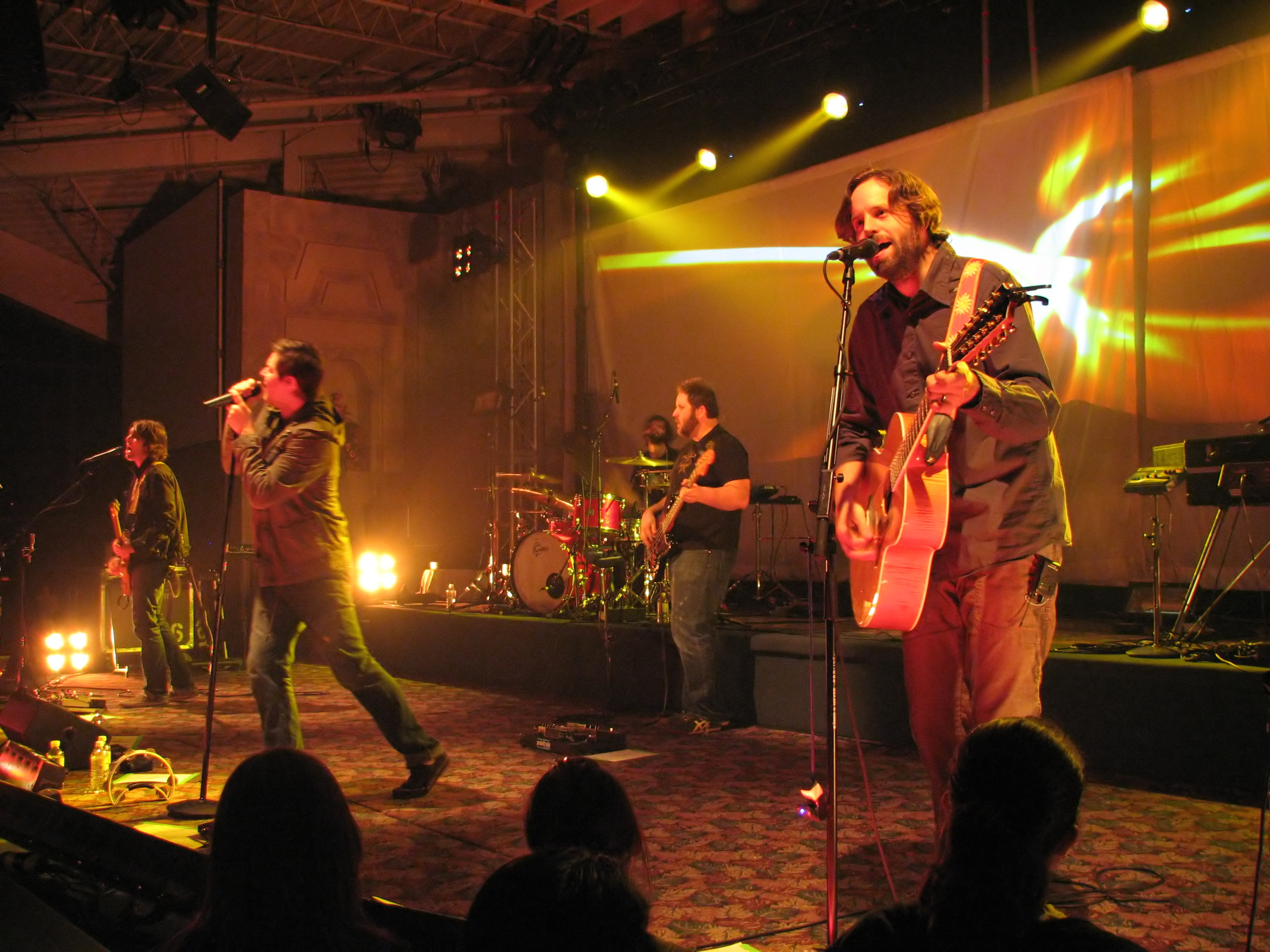

Background information
- Origin: Greenville, Illinois, U.S.
- Genres: Alternative rock; Christian rock; Folk rock; Pop rock; CCM
- Years active: 1993–present
- Labels: Essential; Silvertone; Gray Matters; Nettwerk
- Members: Dan Haseltine; Stephen Mason; Matthew Odmark; Charlie Lowell
- Past members: Matt Bronleewe
- Website: jarsofclay.com

Jars of Clay is a Christian alternative rock band from Nashville, Tennessee. The members met at Greenville College in Greenville, Illinois. They consist of Dan Haseltine on vocals, Charlie Lowell on piano and keyboards, Stephen Mason on lead guitars and Matthew Odmark on rhythm guitars. Although the band has no permanent drummer or bass guitarist, Jeremy Lutito and Gabe Ruschival of Disappointed by Candy fill these roles for live concerts. Past tour band members include Aaron Sands, Scott Savage, and Joe Porter. Jars of Clay's style is a blend of alternative rock, folk, acoustic, and R&B.

The band's name is derived from the New International Version's translation of 2 Corinthians 4:7:

But we have this treasure in jars of clay to show that this all-surpassing power is from God and not from us.

This verse is paraphrased in their song "Four Seven", which appears as a hidden track on the CD release of their self-titled album.

== Band history ==
Charlie Lowell and Matt Bronleewe originally met as friends in high school. There, Lowell first learned of 2 Corinthians 4:7, which later became the basis for the band's name. Dan Haseltine, Steve Mason, Charlie Lowell and Matt Bronleewe formed Jars of Clay at Greenville College, in Greenville, Illinois in the early 1990s. Charlie Lowell first met Dan Haseltine after noticing that he was wearing a Toad the Wet Sprocket shirt. Pursuing a career in music together was not necessarily their original goal; some of the first songs they wrote together were for music and recording classes they were taking at the time. Their second guitarist Matt Odmark joined some time later. While in college playing together at local coffee houses, Jars gained a reputation for their original arrangement of "Rudolph the Red Nosed Reindeer" which had been adapted to the tune of Nirvana's "Smells Like Teen Spirit".

In 1994, the band submitted a demo to a talent competition run by the Gospel Music Association and were selected as finalists. They traveled to Nashville to perform and won the contest. Back in Greenville, they self-released a limited-run of the same demo, Frail, after their song of the same name. The buzz from their performance in Nashville and the demo's popularity resulted in offers from record labels, so the band decided to drop school and move to Nashville. At this time, Bronleewe left the band to finish school and settle down with his fiancée. He was replaced with Matt Odmark, Lowell's childhood friend and fellow McQuaid Jesuit High School alum.

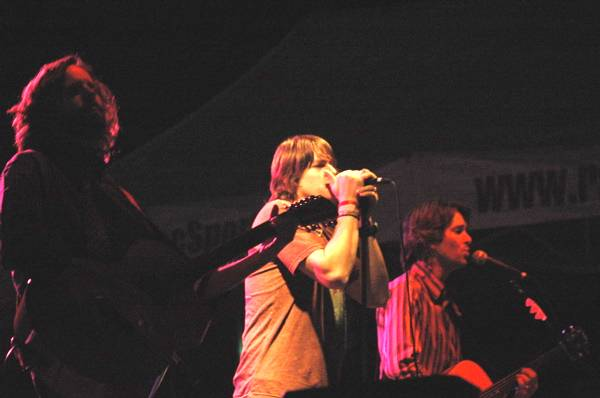
Jars of Clay performing at The University of Texas at Austin

The band signed with Essential Records and started recording their first full-length studio album, Jars of Clay. Adrian Belew, of progressive rock band King Crimson, heard the band and offered to produce, leading to him producing two songs: "Liquid" and "Flood". The band's self-titled debut released in 1995. When the single "Flood" began to climb the charts on mainstream radio stations, Silvertone Records (Essential's parent company) started to heavily promote the song, turning it into one of the biggest mainstream hits ever by a band on a Christian label. The album has since reached multi-platinum certification according to the RIAA. "Flood" peaked at No. 37 on the Billboard Hot 100 and No. 12 on the Billboard Modern Rock chart, and was the band's only secular radio hit.

The band toured in support of other Christian acts, such as PFR, and with mainstream acts like Matchbox Twenty, Duncan Sheik, and Sting. This resulted in a small backlash from some Christian groups.

The band released Drummer Boy, a Christmas EP entitled, at the end of 1995. The EP was re-released, on Silvertone Records, in 1997 with a slightly different track listing. The band's second album, Much Afraid, produced by Stephen Lipson was also released in 1997. The album sold well and like its predecessor, enjoyed crossover success. The album went on to earn a Grammy for "Best Pop/Contemporary Gospel Album". The album has since earned platinum certification by the RIAA. They released two music videos for this album for the songs "Crazy Times" and "Five Candles (You Were There)".

In 1999, Jars of Clay released their third album, If I Left the Zoo, which was produced by Dennis Herring. The record was their third to crossover into the mainstream, and it earned the band their second Grammy award. It was during this time that touring drummer Scott Savage left the band's touring group to play for Jaci Velasquez and was replaced by Joe Porter. Lead radio single, "Unforgetful You", was also featured on the soundtrack to the motion picture Drive Me Crazy. "Collide" was also featured on the motion picture "Hometown Legend". Upon the release of If I Left the Zoo they also released Front Yard Luge and after a year The White Elephant Sessions. If I Left the Zoo so far has the most singles released by Jars of Clay.

In 2001, the four members of the band received honorary degrees at Greenville College. Only three of them, Haseltine, Lowell, and Mason, had studied at the school before dropping out in 1994 to move to Nashville. Odmark still received an honorary degree, despite having attended the University of Rochester in upstate New York.

In 2002, the band self-produced and released their fourth album, The Eleventh Hour, which earned them a Grammy award for the third album in a row. The album relied on studio musicians and the band's touring musicians to fill in for the band's lack of drummer and bass player. Concerts from the subsequent "Eleventh Hour Tour" were recorded for later projects, including the release of a live concert DVD, 11Live: Jars of Clay in Concert.

The double-disc Furthermore: From the Studio, From the Stage features an acoustic disc and a live disc. The acoustic disc consisted of reworked and rearranged fan favorites, two The Eleventh Hour b-sides, and a cover of Adam Again's "Dig". The latter was actually intended for a tribute album for Gene Eugene, who had died recently. The live disc features a recent concert recording that include songs from throughout the band's career.

The band continued the acoustic and organic approach that was featured on Furthermore for their fifth studio album entitled Who We Are Instead, which released on November 4, 2003. On the album, the band revisited various styles they had used previously, as well as experimenting with new influences, such as gospel, hymns, and Nickel Creek's "newgrass" style.

In early 2005, the band released Redemption Songs, a collection of hymns and traditional songs with new melodies and rearranged the music. "God Will Lift Up Your Head", reworked as an acoustic rocker, was a hit for the band on Christian radio. They also covered five hymns from the Indelible Grace CD series (a series which originated from the work of Reformed University Fellowship).

Their next album, Good Monsters, was released on September 5, 2006, and was labeled by Jars of Clay "their first ever rock record". In the September 2006 edition of CCM Magazine, the band credited fellow artist Ashley Cleveland with inspiring the improvisational sound of the album. The magazine called it "the most profound album the Christian music community has released in years".

On September 4, 2007, two albums from the band were released simultaneously. The first was a mainstream release of Live Monsters, an EP of live concert recordings of songs, originally recorded for Good Monsters and that had been previously released through the iTunes Store and the official Jars of Clay online store. The second release, through Essential/Legacy, was a greatest hits album, The Essential Jars of Clay. On April 1, 2008, Essential Records released the band's third greatest hits album, the second in that year, Greatest Hits. Included was the new song "Love is the Protest".

In March 2007, the band announced at a concert in Des Moines, Iowa, that they were no longer on Essential Records and would now be releasing music independently. Later, press releases announced the name of their label as Gray Matters, which would be a partnership with Nettwerk Music Group. Along with the announcement of their new label, the band mentioned that they are planning to record the soundtrack to Honoring a Father's Dream: Sons of Lwala, a documentary about Milton and Fred Ochieng' - brothers from the African village training to be doctors in the States, working to build a clinic in their home town. The band's first release through Gray Matters was a full-length Christmas album, Christmas Songs, on October 16, 2007. On July 29, 2008, Gray Matters Records released Closer EP exclusively through online digital music stores. It was subsequently released on CD on August 19, 2008, and included reworked versions of "Flood", called "Flood (New Rain)", and "Love Song For a Savior ('08)" from their debut album.

The band's tenth studio album, The Long Fall Back to Earth, was released on April 21, 2009. and contained 14 songs, including "Closer" and "Safe to Land", from the Closer EP, and is influenced by 80s music, specifically Tears for Fears and The Cure. The Long Fall Back to Earth debuted at No. 29 on the Billboard 200 mainstream charts, which was Jars of Clay's highest debut since The Eleventh Hour which debuted at No. 28 in 2002. The second single off the album is "Heaven". The song "Hero" was featured on a trailer for NBC's Kings. The Long Fall Back to Earth was nominated for the Grammy to the "Best Pop/Contemporary Gospel Album", though they didn't win in the category.

The Shelter was released October 5, 2010 and features eleven tracks. During their promotion for the album, the band streamed the entire album for a few days before its release on their website. In early 2011 they toured the United States on the Rock And Worship Roadshow headlined by MercyMe. In July 2012, the band traveled to Portland, Oregon, to begin recording Inland at Flora Recording & Playback, a music studio owned and operated by Tucker Martine. The new album was released on August 27, 2013, and features twelve tracks. On March 18, 2013, the band released an exclusive track, "Love in Hard Times", that could only be acquired with the purchase of their EP Under the Weather (Live in Sellersville, PA) directly from their website. On June 17, 2013, the band released a free download of the song "Inland" through Rolling Stone's website. The first single off of the album, "After the Fight", was released on June 18.

The group's activities have been limited in recent years (as of 2022), each band member focusing on individual pursuits, but they continue to release music and perform sporadically. They collaborated with pop group SHEL, performing a Christmas concert in Nashville that led to a 6-song Christmas-themed EP titled A Family Christmas, which included four original songs. In 2022, they contributed a track to There's a Rainbow Somewhere, a tribute album to Randy Stonehill.

== Blood: Water Mission ==
Lead singer Dan Haseltine visited Africa in 2002, which in turn inspired the founding of Blood: Water Mission, a non-profit organization created to raise awareness and money for the poverty and AIDS stricken regions of the continent. The name is derived from, as Haseltine says, "The two things Africa needs most" - clean blood and clean water. The mission has begun the 1000 Wells project, an effort to have a thousand new wells built throughout Africa. In 2012, the organization met their goal of providing clean water to 1,000 African communities through the organization they founded, Blood: Water Mission, and its 1,000 Wells Project. Former Bassist for Jars of Clay Aaron Sands serves as administrative director for the project.

== Beliefs ==
In a 2002 interview with NPR's Scott Simon on Weekend Edition Saturday, responding to a question about the relatively subtle religious content of their music, Haseltine said that the band's songs are not meant to explain their faith but are written about their lives, which are affected by their faith. Haseltine explained the decision to "shy away from ... traditional religious language" as a conscious one, in part to make their music more accessible to those "put off by religion" and to "love people in a way that isn't exclusive to simply people that understand the language of Christianity". Haseltine also stated that art can "make people feel what's true rather than telling them".

== Band members ==
Current

- Dan Haseltine – lead vocals, drums, percussion, melodica, piano, accordion (1993–present)
- Charlie Lowell – keyboards, piano, organ, accordion, backing vocals (1993–present)
- Stephen Mason – guitars, bass, mandolin, backing vocals (1993–present)
- Matt Odmark – guitars, banjo, backing vocals (1994–present)

Former

- Matt Bronleewe – guitars (1993–1994)

Current touring musicians

- Jake Goss – drums (2009–present)

Former touring musicians

- Gabe Ruschival – bass (2006–2011)
- Jeremy Lutito – drums (2005–2009)
- Aaron Sands – bass (1995–2005)
- Joe Porter – drums (1999–2005)
- Scott Savage – drums (1995–99)

== Discography ==
- Jars of Clay (1995)
- Much Afraid (1997)
- If I Left the Zoo (1999)
- The Eleventh Hour (2002)
- Furthermore: From the Studio, from the Stage (2003, studio and live album)
- Who We Are Instead (2003)
- Redemption Songs (2005)
- Good Monsters (2006)
- Christmas Songs (2007)
- The Long Fall Back to Earth (2009)
- The Shelter (2010)
- Inland (2013)

== Awards ==
Jars of Clay has been nominated for and won several awards, including Grammy Awards and several other music awards, known as the GMA Dove Awards. Some of these successes have been collaborative efforts, including two City on a Hill albums and the inspired collaboration for the 2005 film The Chronicles of Narnia: The Lion, the Witch and the Wardrobe. The group has won five Broadcast Music Incorporated (BMI) awards.

In June 2009, Jars of Clay was named as one of PeaceByPeace.com's first peace heroes.
