= Matt Odmark =

American musician (born 1974)

Matthew Odmark
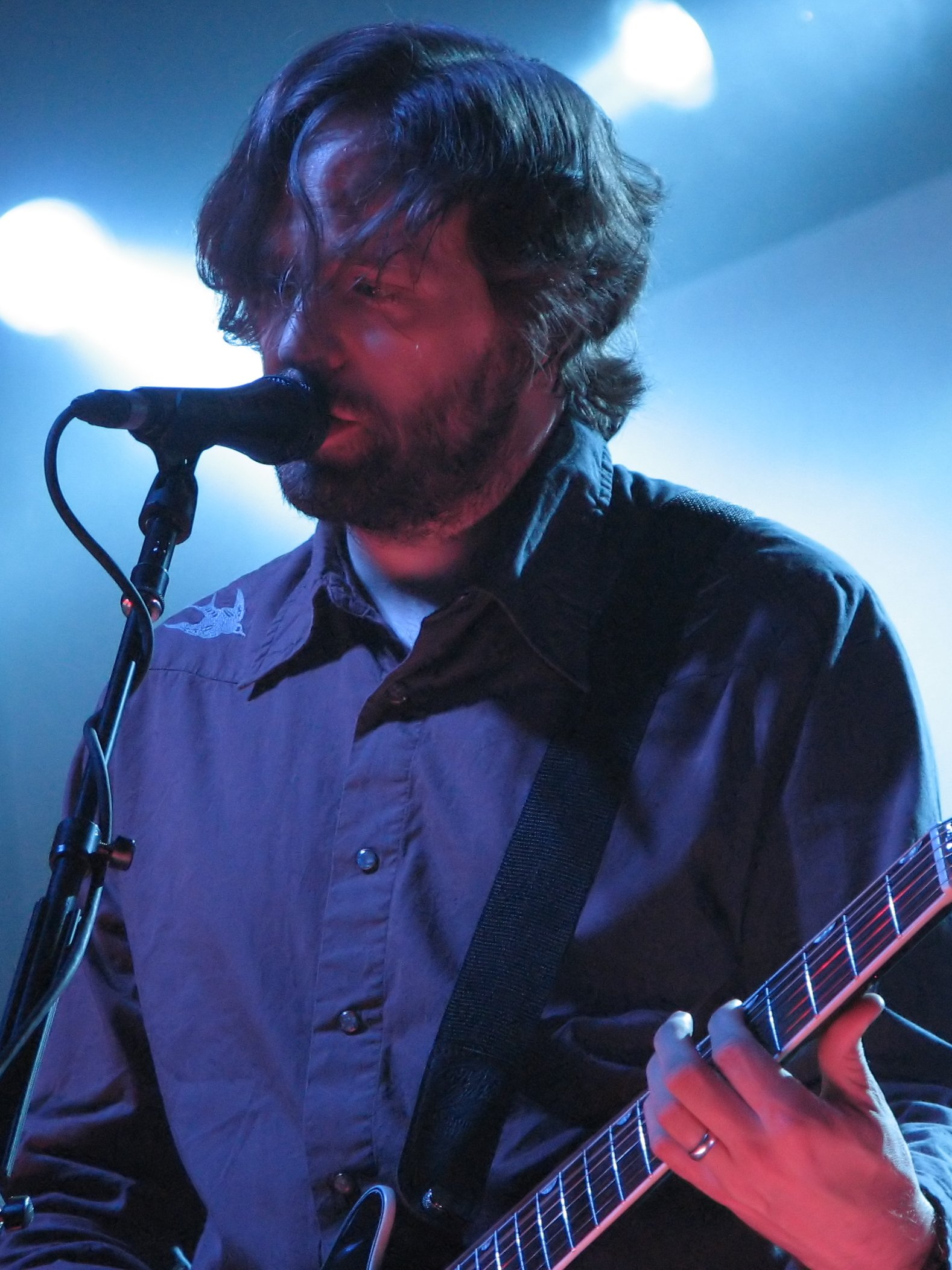

Background information
- Born: Matthew Thomas Odmark; January 25, 1974 (age 52); New York City, New York, U.S.
- Genres: Alternative rock; folk; Christian; country
- Occupations: Musician; songwriter
- Instruments: Guitar; banjo; vocals
- Years active: 1994–present
- Labels: Essential; Silvertone; Gray Matters; Nettwerk
- Member of: Jars of Clay

Matthew Thomas Odmark (born January 25, 1974) is an American musician most known for being a guitarist for Christian alternative folk rock group Jars of Clay.

== Biography ==
Matthew Odmark was raised in Rochester, New York where he attended McQuaid Jesuit High School. He studied English literature at the University of Rochester. As a youth he knew pianist Charlie Lowell. When guitarist Matt Bronleewe left Lowell's band Jars of Clay, Odmark took his place as guitarist and backing vocalist.

In 2001, Jars of Clay were awarded honorary graduations from Greenville College due to their demonstrated understanding of their craft. Despite never being an attendee of the school, Odmark was granted this award also.

== Personal life ==
Matthew Odmark is married to Kristen Odmark.

== Awards ==
In 2001, at the Orville H. Gibson Guitar Awards, Odmark received "Best Acoustic Guitar (Male)".
