= Gray Matters (record label) =

- Parent company: Nettwerk
- Founded: 2007
- Founder: Jars of Clay
- Distributor: Provident/Integrity Distribution
- Genre: Pop rock, folk rock
- Country of origin: United States

Gray Matters is an imprint record label structured underneath the Nettwerk Music Group. The label was founded in 2007 by Jars of Clay band members Dan Haseltine, Stephen Mason, Matt Odmark, and Charlie Lowell. The creation of the label was in response to the band's record contract's ending with Essential Records, and the band's desiring to control their music output. The label will be distributed by Provident/Integrity Distribution (as was Essential Records) to the Christian and mainstream markets. The band had been with Nettwerk under their management division since 2003.

As of now, Jars of Clay and Disappointed by Candy are the only acts signed to the record label. The first Gray Matters release will be a Disappointed by Candy album, followed by the Jars of Clay's Christmas album, Christmas Songs, due to be released on October 16, 2007. Shortly after, the band will record the soundtrack to a documentary that a friend of the band is producing about the African village of Lwala.

== Artists ==
=== Former ===
- Jars of Clay
