= Essential Records (Christian) =

American record label

- Parent company: Sony Music Nashville
- Founded: 1992
- Founder: Robert Beeson
- Distributor: Provident
- Genre: Contemporary Christian music
- Country of origin: United States
- Location: Franklin, Tennessee
- Official website: providentlabelgroup.com

Essential Records is a contemporary Christian record label based in Franklin, Tennessee. It is a division of the major label Sony Music Nashville.

== History ==
It was established in 1992 and acquired by Brentwood Music in 1993. The label's first big hit release was "Flood" by Jars of Clay in 1996. The song was a hit on mainstream radio before hitting on Christian formats; it reached No. 12 on the Billboard Modern Rock Tracks chart and appeared in the Billboard Hot 100. Today it is part of the Sony Music Nashville, a division of Sony Music Entertainment.

== Essential Worship ==
Also, the label has an imprint named Essential Worship, which provides resources for worship leaders, and the deals are different than traditional ones. It is a record label that provides tools for musicians, and worship leaders.

== Sub*Lime Records sublabel ==
Sub*Lime's Logo

Sub*Lime Records was a sub-label of Essential Records, via Brentwood Music and the Zomba Music Group. Signed artists included Honey, Fold Zandura, Kosmos Express, Quayle, Ruby Joe, and Silage.

== Artists ==
=== Current ===
The roster of artists from May 2019:

- Branan Murphy
- Casting Crowns
- Elle Limebear
- Jamie Kimmett
- KB (Essential Sound/Provident)
- Land of Color
- Leanna Crawford
- Matt Maher
- Matthew West
- One Sonic Society
- Red Rocks Worship
- Rhett Walker
- Seph Schlueter
- Tauren Wells
- Elevation Worship
- Vertical Worship
- Zach Williams
- All Essential Worship musicians

=== Former ===
- Warren Barfield
- Brooke Barrettsmith (active)
- Caedmon's Call (disbanded, formerly with Fair Trade Services)
- Andy Cherry (active)
- Day of Fire (inactive since 2010)
- FFH (active)
- Mia Fieldes
- Fireflight (active, with RockFest Records)
- Brian Goodell
- Grey Holiday (disbanded in 2008)
- Jars of Clay (active, with Gray Matters)
- J Monty (active, independent)
- KJ-52 (active, with BEC Recordings)
- Los Caminos (inactive)
- Leeland (active, with Integrity Music)
- Krystal Meyers (inactive)
- The Neverclaim
- Bebo Norman (retired in 2013, formerly with BEC Recordings)
- Paul Colman Trio (solo act/disbanded)
- Chuckie Perez (active, independent)
- Andrew Peterson (active, with Centricity Music)
- Pillar (active)
- Plumb (active, with Curb Records)
- Red (active, independent)
- Revive (disbanded)
- Kerrie Roberts (active, with Reunion Records)
- The Royal Royal (active)
- Royal Tailor (disbanded)
- Tal & Acacia (active)
- Tenth Avenue North (disbanded)
- Third Day (disbanded)
- True Vibe (disbanded)
- V*Enna (disbanded in 2001)
- Rhett Walker Band (disbanded)
- I Am They(disbanded, formerly with Big Future Music Group/Truss Records)
