= DC Talk discography =

- Studio albums: 5
- Extended plays: 3
- Live albums: 1
- Compilation albums: 10
- Singles: 23
- Music videos: 14

The discography of DC Talk, a Christian music band formed in the late 1980s in Lynchburg, Virginia, consists of five studio albums, three extended plays, and 23 singles. The group consists of Toby McKeehan, Kevin Max, and Michael Tait. They began as a hip hop group, but in the mid-90s they reinvented themselves as a pop/rock group. In both instances, they found critical and commercial success in both the Christian music industry as well as the general market.

== Studio albums ==
Year	Album details	Peak chart positions		Certifications (sales thresholds)
Year	Album details	US	US Christ.	Certifications (sales thresholds)
1989	DC Talk: Released: June 13, 1989; Label: ForeFront Records; Format: CD, cassette	—	10	
1990	Nu Thang: Released: 1990; Label: ForeFront; Format: CD, cassette	—	5	RIAA: Gold
1992	Free at Last: Released: November 1, 1992; Label: ForeFront; Format: CD, cassette, vinyl	—	1	RIAA: Platinum
1995	Jesus Freak: Released: November 21, 1995; Label: ForeFront; Format: CD, cassette, vinyl	16	1	RIAA: 2× Platinum; MC: Gold
1998	Supernatural: Released: September 22, 1998; Label: ForeFront/Virgin Records; Format: CD, cassette, vinyl	4	1	RIAA: Platinum

== Live albums ==
Year	Title	Label(s)	Chart positions		Certifications (sales thresholds)
Year	Title	Label(s)	US	US Christ.	Certifications (sales thresholds)
1997	Welcome to the Freak Show	ForeFront Records	109	3	RIAA: Gold
2020	The Supernatural Experience (Live)	ForeFront	—	—	
2021	Free at Last (Live)	ForeFront	—	—	

== Compilation albums ==
Year	Title	Label(s)	Chart positions		Certifications (sales thresholds)
Year	Title	Label(s)	US	US Christ.	Certifications (sales thresholds)
2000	Intermission: the Greatest Hits	ForeFront Records	81	3	RIAA: Gold
2003	8 Great Hits	ForeFront Records	—	—	—
2006	The Early Years	ForeFront Records	—	—	—
2006	Top 5 Hits	ForeFront Records	—	—	—
2007	Double Take (Jesus Freak/Supernatural)	ForeFront Records	—	—	—
2007	Greatest Hits	ForeFront Records	—	—	—
2008	Two For One: Free At Last / Supernatural	ForeFront Records	—	—	—
2008	Greatest Hits	ForeFront Records	—	—	—
2009	The Ultimate Collection	ForeFront Records	—	—	—
2012	10 Great Songs	ForeFront Records	—	—	—

== Extended plays ==
Year	Title	Label(s)	Chart positions	
Year	Title	Label(s)	US	U.S. Christ.
1994	Free at Last: Extended Play Remixes	ForeFront Records	—	35
1995	Jesus Freak (Maxi Single) AV/CD	ForeFront Records	—	—
1997	Welcome to the Freak Show – Bonus Disc	ForeFront Records	—	—
2001	Solo	ForeFront Records	142	5

== Singles ==
Year	Single	Peak chart positions							Album
Year	Single	US	US Pop Airplay	US AC	US Adult	US Christ. AC	US Christ. CHR	US Christ. Rock	Album
1989	"Heavenbound"	—	—	—	—	—	—	—	DC Talk
1989	"Spinnin' Round"	—	—	—	—	—	—	13	DC Talk
1990	"I Luv Rap Music"	—	—	—	—	—	—	—	Nu Thang
1990	"Can I Get A Witness?"	—	—	—	—	—	—	—	Nu Thang
1990	"Nu Thang"	—	—	—	—	—	3	—	Nu Thang
1990	"No More"	—	—	—	—	—	—	10	Nu Thang
1991	"Talk It Out"	—	—	—	—	—	22	—	Nu Thang
1992	"Walls"	—	—	—	—	—	—	18	Nu Thang
1992	"Jesus Is Just Alright"	—	—	—	—	—	2	11	Free At Last
1993	"Socially Acceptable"	—	—	—	—	—	1	—	Free At Last
1993	"Time Is..."	—	—	—	—	—	12	22	Free At Last
1993	"Lean on Me"	—	—	—	—	7	1	—	Free At Last
1994	"The Hardway"	—	—	—	—	25	1	—	Free At Last
1994	"Say the Words"	—	—	—	—	—	2	—	Free At Last
1994	"Luv Is A Verb"	—	—	—	—	—	15	—	Free At Last
1995	"Jesus Freak"	— (Note: "Jesus Freak" did not enter the Billboard Hot 100, but peaked at number 10 on the Bubbling Under Hot 100 Singles chart.)	—	—	—	—	23	1	Jesus Freak
1995	"I Wish We'd All Been Ready"	—	—	—	—	40	—	—	Intermission: the Greatest Hits
1995	"Mind's Eye"	—	—	—	—	—	1	—	Jesus Freak
1996	"Like It, Love It, Need It"	—	—	—	—	—	—	1	Jesus Freak
1996	"Between You and Me"	29	15	24	11	1	1	—	Jesus Freak
1996	"In the Light"	—	—	—	—	3	1	—	Jesus Freak
1996	"What If I Stumble?"	—	—	—	—	3	1	—	Jesus Freak
1997	"So Help Me God"	—	—	—	—	—	—	3	Jesus Freak
1997	"Colored People"	—	—	—	—	3	1	—	Jesus Freak
1997	"Day by Day"	—	—	—	—	—	—	3	Jesus Freak
1997	"What Have We Become?"	—	—	—	—	32	1	—	Jesus Freak
1998	"My Will"	—	—	—	—	1	1	—	Exodus
1998	"Into Jesus"	—	—	—	—	2	1	—	Supernatural
1998	"My Friend (So Long)"	—	—	—	—	—	1	1	Supernatural
1999	"Consume Me"	—	—	—	—	1	1	—	Supernatural
1999	"Wanna Be Loved"	—	—	—	—	13	1	—	Supernatural
1999	"Supernatural"	—	—	—	—	—	—	2	Supernatural
1999	"Godsend"	—	—	—	—	7	1	—	Supernatural
2000	"It's Killing Me"	—	—	—	—	—	—	4	Supernatural
2000	"Dive"	—	—	—	—	—	4	9	Supernatural
2000	"Say The Words (Now)"	—	—	—	—	1	1	—	Intermission: the Greatest Hits
2002	"Let's Roll"	—	—	—	—	—	15	2	Let's Roll: Together In Unity, Faith, and Hope (Various artists album)
2003	"The Hardway (Revisited)"	—	—	—	—	—	—	—	—
"—" denotes singles that did not chart.

== Other releases ==
Title	Year	Label(s)	Chart positions		RIAA Certification	CRIA Certification
Title	Year	Label(s)	The Billboard 200	Top Contemporary Christian	RIAA Certification	CRIA Certification
Free At Last – The Music (10th Anniversary)	2002	ForeFront Records	—	—	—	—
Jesus Freak: 10th Anniversary Special Edition	2006	ForeFront Records	—	—	—	—

== Original collaborations ==
Note: This list is for dc Talk songs not found on dc Talk albums. Compilation albums (such as the "Wow" series) should not be listed here. "My Will" and "I Wish We'd All Been Ready" appear here because they were on these albums BEFORE they were on later dc Talk releases.

Year	Song(s) / Notes	Album	Album Artist	Label(s)
1990	"Yo! Ho Ho"	Yo! Ho Ho	Various artists	Benson Records
1990	"Reason for the Season"	Yo! Ho Ho	Various artists	Benson Records
1990	"Yo! Ho Ho (Instrumental Track)"	Yo! Ho Ho	Various artists	Benson Records
1991	"Addicted to Jesus": see music video below	Addicted to Jesus	Carman	Benson Records
1992	"I Love My Neighbour"	The Beginner’s Bible		Sparrow Records
1992	"Got To B Tru": Songs open with clip of "Nu Thang"; Only Toby actually sings with Chapman	The Great Adventure	Steven Curtis Chapman	Sparrow Records
1994	"We Three Kings"	Joyful Christmas		Columbia/Sony
1995	"I Wish We’d All Been Ready": Released as a B-side on their "Jesus Freak" single on the same day; Later included on Intermission: The Greatest Hits	One Way: The Songs of Larry Norman	Various artists	ForeFront Records
1998	"My Will": Later appeared on Intermission: The Greatest Hits and almost all of dc Talk's hits compilations	Exodus	Various artists	Rocketown Records
1998	"My Deliverer": cover of Rich Mullins song just after his death	Prince of Egypt (Inspirational) soundtrack	Various artists	DreamWorks Records
2000	"Spirit in the Sky": cover of Norman Greenbaum song from 1969	Jesus: Music From & Inspired by the Epic Mini-Series	Various artists	Capitol Records
2002	"Let's Roll": 9/11 tribute song that briefly united DC Talk and was named after the last words spoken by Todd Beamer before he led passengers to stop the United Airlines Flight 93 hijackers	Let’s Roll: Together in Unity, Faith, & Hope	Various artists	Curb Records
2004	"Atmosphere (Remix)": tobyMac performed song solo and with dc Talk on same album	Welcome to Diverse City	tobyMac	ForeFront Records
2007	"The Cross": cover of a Prince song from his 1987 album Sign "O" the Times	The Blood	Kevin Max	Northern Records
2015	"Love Feels Like"	This Is Not a Test	tobyMac	ForeFront Records
2022	"Space"	Life After Death	tobyMac	forefront records

== Vocal appearances ==
This is a list of songs that include all three members of dc Talk.

Year	Album	Song(s)/Notes	Label(s)
1993	Change Your World by Michael W. Smith	Michael and Kevin sing backup on multiple songs; Toby sings intro on "I Wanna Tell the World"; Toby received production credits for programming	Reunion
1997	Blue Obsession by Michael McDonald	"Ain’t That Peculiar"; Michael and Kevin can be heard at 1:15 mark and throughout; Toby has a quiet rap at 2:35 mark, spoken-word backing at end; Kevin has a backing solo at 2:46 mark	Ramp
1998	Prince of Egypt - Soundtrack by Various Artists	"Humanity"; dc Talk along with Jessica Andrews, Clint Black, Boyz II Men, Shirley Caesar, Jesse Campbell, Carman, Beth Nielsen Chapman, Christian, Charlie Daniels, Linda Davis, Danny Glover, Jeff Goldblum, Amy Grant, The Rickey Grundy Chorale, Fred Hammond & Radical For Christ, Jars of Clay, Toby Keith, Val Kilmer, Alison Krauss, Mac McAnally, Donnie McClurkin, Brian McKnight, Helen Mirren, Brian Stokes Mitchell, Patrick Stewart, Take 6, Tyrone Tribbet and Greater Anointing, BeBe Winans and CeCe Winans; Kevin can be heard at 1:50 singing "Man versus man for number one"	Dreamworks
2003	Dove Hits 2002 by Various Artists	"In God We Trust"; Toby opens song with scripture reading; dc Talk is one of many in the "Voices of Hope" all-star lineup; Kevin can distinctly be heard at about 3:04 mark; Song was dedicated to Sep 11 healing; The song was played at the Dove Awards of 2002, Michael Tait could be seen as one of the main singers.	Sparrow

== Remixed songs ==
This list is for dc Talk songs that were remixed without involvement from dc Talk, although they are still considered part of dc Talk's official discography.

Year	Album	Song(s) / Notes	Label(s)
2003	Smash-Ups	"Colored People (mixed with the Newsboys Entertaining Angels)"; "Jesus Freak (mixed with ZOEgirl's Dismissed)"	Sparrow Records
1998	Mixdown	“Socially Acceptable (Mixdown Remix)"	ForeFront Records

== Audio interviews ==
Year	Album	Song(s) / Notes	Label(s)
1990	Rap - Straight From the Streets	Brief interview with Toby; Includes "Spinnin' Round" from 1989's DC Talk	Benson Records

== Videography ==
Year	Title	Formats	RIAA Certification
1992	Rap, Rock, & Soul	VHS	-
1994	Narrow Is the Road	VHS	Gold(50,000+ sold)
1996	Jesus Freak 1996 Tour Promo Video	VHS	-
1997, 2003	Welcome to the Freak Show	VHS (1997), DVD (2003)	Gold(50,000+ sold)
1998	The dc Talk Video Collection: Narrow Is the Road; Welcome to the Freak Show; Video Singles	VHS	Gold
1999	Sneak Peek at The Supernatural Experience	VHS	-
1999, 2003	The Supernatural Experience	VHS (1999), DVD (2003)	Platinum
2002	Free at Last: The Movie	DVD	-
2007	Greatest Hits - Special Edition	DVD	-

=== Music videos ===
Year	Title	Album	Award	Featured On*	Source
1989	"Heavenbound"	DC Talk		Rap, Rock, & Soul	Watch
1991	"Nu Thang"	Nu Thang		Rap, Rock, & Soul	Watch
1991	"I Luv Rap Music"	Nu Thang		Rap, Rock, & Soul	Watch
1992	"Walls"	Nu Thang		Rap, Rock, & Soul; Video Singles	Watch
1993	"Jesus Is Just Alright"	Free At Last		Narrow Is the Road; Video Singles; Free At Last - The Movie; Greatest Hits (2007 CD/DVD)	Watch
1994	"The Hardway"	Free At Last		Narrow Is the Road; Video Singles; Free At Last - The Movie; Greatest Hits (2007 CD/DVD)	Watch
1994	"Luv Is A Verb"	Free At Last		Narrow Is the Road; Greatest Hits (2007 CD/DVD)	Watch
1994	"I Wish We'd All Been Ready"	One Way		WoW Hits 1997: The Videos	Watch
1995	"Jesus Freak"	Jesus Freak	1997 Dove Award "Best Short-Form Video"; 1997 Billboard Award "Best Contemporary Christian Video"	Video Singles; Welcome to the Freak Show (DVD only); Greatest Hits (2007 CD/DVD)	Watch
1996	"Just Between You and Me"	Jesus Freak	1998 Dove Award "Best Short-Form Video"	Video Singles; Welcome to the Freak Show (DVD); Greatest Hits (2007 CD/DVD); X - The Birthday Video	Watch
1997	"Colored People"	Jesus Freak		Video Singles; Welcome to the Freak Show (DVD); Greatest Hits (2007 CD/DVD)	Watch
1997	"Day by Day"	Jesus Freak		Video Singles	Watch
1998	"My Friend (So Long)"	Supernatural		The Supernatural Experience; Greatest Hits (2007 CD/DVD)	Watch
1999	"Consume Me"	Supernatural	1999 Billboard Award "Best Contemporary Christian Video"	The Supernatural Experience; Greatest Hits (2007 CD/DVD)	Watch

- Only official dc Talk releases are listed. Video compilations (such as the "Wow" DVDs) should not be included in this section.

=== Video appearances ===
Year	Title	with Artist	Original Album	Included On	Source
1991	"Addicted to Jesus"	Carman	Addicted to Jesus	Addicted to Jesus (VHS Long-Form Video)	Watch
1994	"AKA Public School"	Audio Adrenaline	Don't Censor Me	Big House (VHS Long-Form Video)	Watch

=== Video contributions and interviews ===
Note: This list is for dc Talk songs that were remixed without involvement from dc Talk, although they are still considered part of dc Talk's official discography.

Year	Video	Song(s) / Notes	Label(s)
1994	The Works by The Billy Graham Crusade	Live performance of "Jesus Is Just Alright" from the 1994 Bill Graham Crusade	n/a
1998	X - The Birthday Album	Interviews; songs include "Jesus Freak", "Jesus is Just Alright", and "Walls".; Also includes Bleach covering "Heavenbound".; On the video version of the album has the music video for "Between You and Me".	ForeFront Records
2000	Creation Festival: The Movie	Live performance of "In the Light" from Creation Festival 1999; Interview	n/a

== Tributes ==
- 2006: Freaked! A Gotee Tribute to dc Talk's Jesus Freak (Gotee Records)

== DC Talk: Solo ==
- TobyMac
- Tait
- Kevin Max
- Newsboys (Michael Tait)
- Audio Adrenaline (Kevin Max)
