= Greatest Hits (DC Talk album) =

Greatest hits album by DC Talk
- Released: June 26, 2007
- Recorded: 1992–2000
- Genre: Christian rock, Christian hip hop, alternative rock, pop rock
- Length: 76:53
- Label: ForeFront

DC Talk chronology
Jesus Freak: 10th Anniversary Special Edition (2006)	Greatest Hits (2007)	Greatest Hits (2008)

Professional ratings
Review scores
Source	Rating
Jesus Freak Hideout	4/5 stars

Greatest Hits is a compilation album from DC Talk that include most of their chart-topping radio singles and fan favorites spanning the course of their career. The album is, for the most part, a re-release of their previous greatest hits album, Intermission: the Greatest Hits, but with the addition of "Godsend" and "Red Letters", and the subtraction of "Chance", "Sugar Coat It", "I Wish We'd All Been Ready", and the Mr. & Mrs. Morgan acts.

== Track listing ==
No.	Title	Originally recorded on	Length
1.	"Jesus Freak"	Jesus Freak (1995)	4:51
2.	"Say The Words (Now)"	Free at Last (1992)	4:41
3.	"Colored People"	Jesus Freak (1995)	4:25
4.	"Jesus Is Just Alright"	Free at Last (1992)	4:20
5.	"Between You and Me"	Jesus Freak (1995)	5:00
6.	"Mind's Eye"	Jesus Freak (1995)	5:07
7.	"Consume Me"	Supernatural (1998)	4:52
8.	"My Will"	Exodus (1998)	5:25
9.	"In the Light (Charlie Peacock cover)"	Jesus Freak (1995)	4:56
10.	"Socially Acceptable"	Free at Last (1992)	4:47
11.	"Luv Is A Verb"	Free at Last (1992)	4:00
12.	"Supernatural"	Supernatural (1998)	4:00
13.	"The Hardway"	Free at Last (1992)	5:16
14.	"Godsend"	Supernatural (1998)	4:14
15.	"What If I Stumble?"	Jesus Freak (1995)	4:56
16.	"Red Letters"	Supernatural (1998)	6:08
Total length:			1:16:58
