= What If I Stumble? =

Single by DC Talk

from the album Jesus Freak
- Released: 1996
- Recorded: 1995
- Genre: CCM; Christian alternative rock
- Length: 5:06
- Label: ForeFront; Virgin
- Songwriters: Toby McKeehan; Daniel Joseph
- Producers: Toby McKeehan; Mark Heimermann

DC Talk singles chronology
| "Between You and Me" (1996) | "What If I Stumble?" (1996) | "Like It, Love It, Need It" (1996) |

"What If I Stumble?" is a song by the American contemporary Christian music group DC Talk. Released in 1995, it was the third radio single from the group's fourth album, Jesus Freak.

"What If I Stumble?" received many critical plaudits from Christian sources for its deep and introspective lyrics concerning the possibilities that personal weaknesses could bring shame to Christ.

== Composition ==
The song features a vocal quote from Brennan Manning.

"The greatest single cause of atheism in the world today is Christians who acknowledge Jesus with their lips and then walk out the door and deny him by their lifestyle. That is what an unbelieving world simply finds unbelievable."

== Release and acclaim ==
The song was released as the third single for Jesus Freak in 1996 and received positive comments from Christian music critics.

"What If I Stumble?" was No. 1 for six weeks on Christian Radio.

== Other releases ==
Various versions of "What If I Stumble?" have appeared on several DC Talk official releases, including the band's greatest hits album Intermission. A live version of "What If I Stumble?" was included on the 1997 live release Welcome to the Freak Show.

=== Cover versions ===
On the DC Talk tribute album, Freaked!, Sarah Kelly recorded a cover of "What If I Stumble?"

== Personnel ==
- Toby McKeehan – vocals, production
- Michael Tait – vocals
- Kevin Max Smith – vocals
- John Painter – bass guitar
- Chris Rodriquez – guitar
- Jerry McPherson – mandolin
- John Painter – bass guitar, guitar, accordion
- Todd Collins – programming, cowbell, drums
- Shawn McWilliams – drums
- Todd Collins – percussion
- Mark Heimermann – production, vocal arrangement

== Accolades ==
| Publication | Country | Accolade | Year | Rank |
|---|---|---|---|---|
| CCM Magazine | United States | 100 Greatest Songs in Christian Music | 2006 | 31 |
