= Jesus Freaks (book) =

1999 book

- Author: DC Talk, Voice of the Martyrs
- Publisher: Bethany House
- Publication date: 1999
- ISBN: 0-7642-0083-6

Jesus Freaks is a 1999 book by DC Talk and Voice of the Martyrs. The name comes from DC Talk's album and song Jesus Freak that they released in 1995. It includes stories and testimonies of Christians from all over the world, past and present, who have been persecuted, tortured, or martyred for their Christian beliefs. Jesus Freaks is published by Bethany House (ISBN 0-7642-0083-6).

Related books were also released including a blank journaling book Jesus Freaks: A Journal (2001), a devotional-style book, Live Like a Jesus Freak (2001), and a book of Bible verses, Promises for a Jesus Freak (2001)

== Sequel and other related publications ==
A follow-up volume, Jesus Freaks Volume II, by DC Talk and Voice of the Martyrs was published in 2003.

Voice of the Martyrs released its own stories book Extreme Devotion in 2002.

Michael Tait and TobyMac of DC Talk have also compiled stories in the books Under God and Living Under God in 2004, published by WallBuilders.

== See also ==
- List of Christian martyrs
