= Roots & Wings =

EP by Jars of Clay
- Released: March 1, 2005
- Recorded: 2004–2005
- Genres: Christian rock; folk rock
- Length: 14:27
- Label: Essential
- Producer: Jars of Clay

Jars of Clay chronology
Who We Are Instead (2003)	Roots & Wings (2005)	Redemption Songs (2005)

Roots & Wings is a digitally released EP from Christian folk/rock group Jars of Clay, which preceded the release of their 2005 studio album, Redemption Songs. The track "What Wondrous Love" is a B-side from the Redemption Songs recording sessions, while "Shipwrecked" and "Tonight" are B-sides from the recording sessions of Who We Are Instead. The latter two tracks can also be found on the bonus disc that was released with the limited-edition version of Who We Are Instead.

== Track listing ==
All songs by Jars of Clay (Dan Haseltine/Charlie Lowell/Stephen Mason/Matt Odmark).

No.	Title	Length
1.	"God Will Lift Up Your Head"	4:26
2.	"What Wondrous Love"	4:01
3.	"Shipwrecked"	2:58
4.	"Tonight"	3:42
Total length:		14:27
