= Guardian Force =

Guardian Force may refer to:

- Angel Wars
- Guardian Force (Final Fantasy), a form of Summon magic in Final Fantasy VIII
- Guardian Force (video game), 1998 arcade and Saturn shooter by Success
- Zoids: Guardian Force, 1999 anime series whose title refers to the fictional organization
