= Sarah Kelly =

American musician (born 1976)

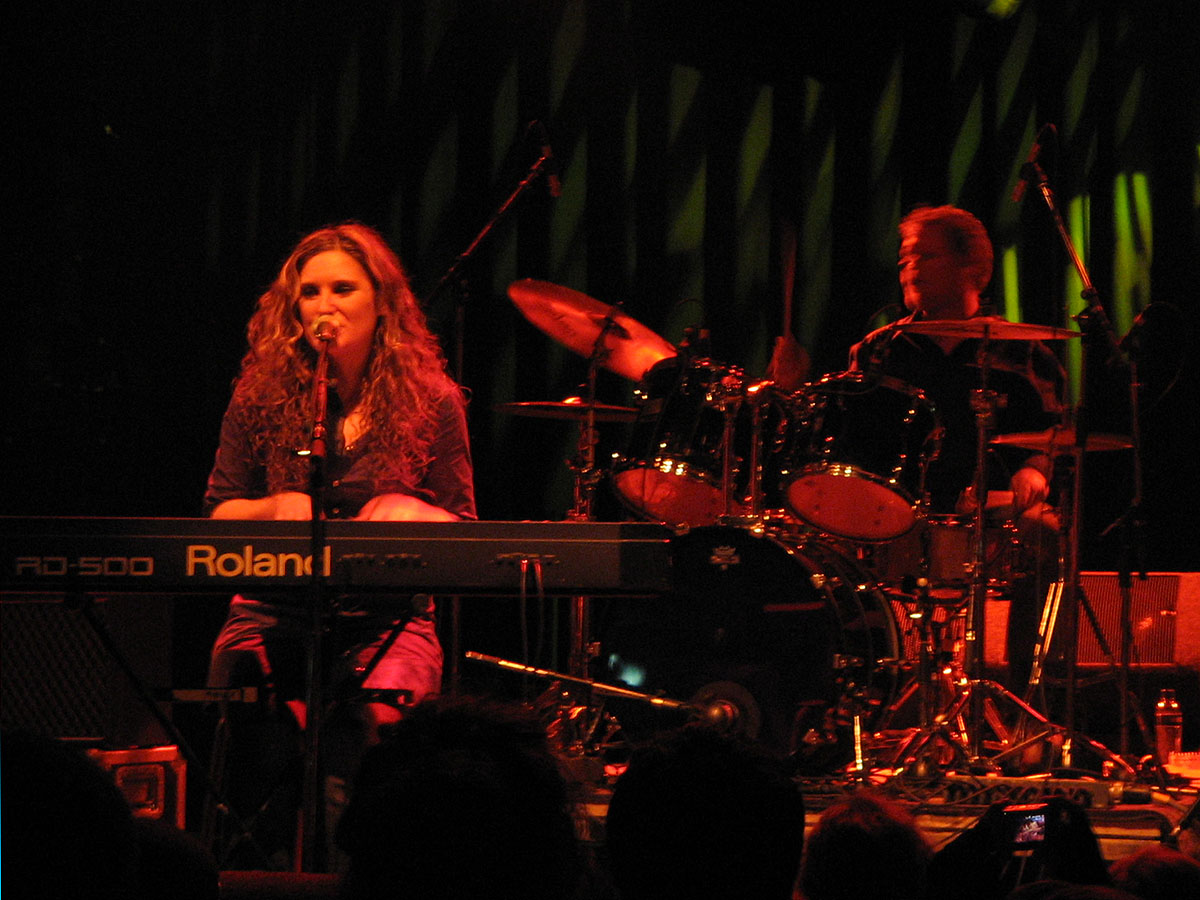
- Kelly performing in 2007

Background information
- Also known as: Sarah Ekman
- Born: Sarah Jean Kelly; September 13, 1976 (age 50)
- Origin: Rockford, Illinois
- Genres: CCM, power pop
- Website: sarahkelly.com

Sarah Jean Kelly (born September 13, 1976) is an American contemporary Christian musician from Rockford, Illinois. She was signed to Gotee Records, a Christian label under EMI. Kelly is a two time Grammy Award nominee for albums Take Me Away and Where the Past Meets Today in the category of Best Rock Or Rap Gospel Album. Her music has compared to mainstream artists Sheryl Crow, Janis Joplin, Norah Jones, Carole King, and Sarah McLachlan. She runs a music school in The Woodlands, TX.

== Personal life ==
Kelly is married to Jonas Ekman whom she met at a concert in Sweden. They were married in 2008. The couple lives in The Woodlands, Texas and she leads worship at Woodlands Church.

== Discography ==
| Year | Title | Label | Chart Positions | | | |
| Year | Title | Label | Top 200 | US Christian | US Heat | Swedish Albums Chart |
|---|---|---|---|---|---|---|
| 2000 | Experience Worship/You Overwhelm Me | Self-Released | — | — | — | |
| 2003 | Rebuild My Heart | Self-Released | — | — | — | |
| 2003 | Sarah Kelly EP | Self-Released | — | — | — | |
| 2004 | Take Me Away | Gotee Records | — | 23 | 32 | |
| 2006 | Where the Past Meets Today | Gotee Records | 165 | 9 | 6 | |
| 2007 | Live | Self-Released | — | — | — | |
| 2008 | Born To Worship | Gotee Records | — | — | — | |
| 2010 | Midnight Sun | Self-Released | — | — | — | 28 |
| 2014 | My Corner of Heaven | Self-Released | — | — | — | — |

Sarah Kelly has also recorded a cover of "What If I Stumble," by Christian rock/pop group dc Talk, which appears on the compilation album Freaked! A Gotee Tribute to dc Talk's "Jesus Freak."'

Sarah Kelly was featured on Jars of Clay's single "I'll Fly Away" from the album Redemption Songs released in 2005. She also recorded a cover of "Stand Up For Jesus" under Maranatha! Music, which was written by Adam Watts and Andy Dodd.
