= Freaked! =

FREAKED! A Gotee Tribute To dc Talk's "Jesus Freak"

Compilation album by Various artists
- Released: June 20, 2006
- Recorded: 2006
- Genre: Christian rock, CCM
- Length: 60:15
- Label: Gotee

Various artists chronology
| Hip Hope 2006 (2005) | FREAKED! A Gotee Tribute To dc Talk's "Jesus Freak" (2006) | Hip Hope 2007 (2007) |

Professional ratings
Review scores
| Source | Rating |
|---|---|
| Jesus Freak Hideout | 3.5/5 stars |

Freaked!: A Gotee Tribute to DC Talk's Jesus Freak is a 2006 tribute album primarily featuring covers of songs from the American Christian rap and rock trio DC Talk's 1995 album Jesus Freak, performed by various artists signed to the Gotee Records label.

Of the original album's 13 tracks, Freaked! omits only one: "Alas, My Love", a hidden track at the end of the original album.

== Track listing ==
| No. | Title | Artist | Length |
|---|---|---|---|
| 1. | "So Help Me God" | The Showdown | 5:00 |
| 2. | "Colored People" | The Gotee Brothers, Ayiesha Woods & John Reuben | 4:17 |
| 3. | "Jesus Freak" | 4th Avenue Jones | 4:39 |
| 4. | "What If I Stumble?" | Sarah Kelly | 3:45 |
| 5. | "Day by Day" | House of Heroes | 4:49 |
| 6. | "Mr. Tobin" | Tobin | 1:29 |
| 7. | "Between You and Me" | Relient K | 3:37 |
| 8. | "Like It, Love It, Need It" | Fighting Instinct | 4:44 |
| 9. | "Jesus Freak" (Reprise) | John Reuben | 2:11 |
| 10. | "In the Light" | StorySide:B | 4:44 |
| 11. | "What Have We Become?" | Liquid | 5:32 |
| 12. | "Mind's Eye" | Family Force 5 | 2:59 |
| 13. | "The Gotee Brothers Interlude" | The Gotee Brothers | 1:03 |
| 14. | "Between You and Me" | Paul Wright & Ayiesha Woods | 5:05 |
| 15. | "Jesus Freak" | Chasing Victory | 6:21 |
| Total length: | | | 60:15 |

== Awards ==
In 2007, the album was nominated for a Dove Award for Special Event Album of the Year at the 38th GMA Dove Awards.
