= List of angels in fiction =

This is a list of angels in fiction. For angels in theology, see the list of theological angels.

== A ==
- Abel (Angel's Friends)
- Abel (Hazbin Hotel)
- Abdiel (Paradise Lost and other fiction)
- Abner (Supernatural)
- Adam (Hazbin Hotel)
- Adam (Neon Genesis Evangelion)
- Adam (Touched by an Angel)
- Adina (Supernatural)
- Ainur (J. R. R. Tolkien's The Silmarillion)
- Alexiel (Angel Sanctuary)
- Alice Angel (Bendy and the Ink Machine)
- Amelia Harvey (Casper)
- Amenadiel (Lucifer comic-book and TV-series)
- Anael (Supernatural)
- Andrew (Touched by an Angel)
- Angel (Monica's Gang)
- Angel (Chainsaw Man)
- Angel (The Amazing Digital Circus)
- Angemon (Digimon)
- Ang-Lì (Angel's Friends)
- Akobel (Supernatural)
- Angela (Spawn)
- Annabelle (All Dogs Go to Heaven)
- Al (Angels in the Outfield)
- Apollyon (The Binding of Isaac: Afterbirth+)
- Arael (Neon Genesis Evangelion)
- Archangelo (Angel's Friends)
- Arianna (Angel Wars)
- Arkhan (Angel's Friends)
- Armisael (Neon Genesis Evangelion)
- Asmodel (DC Comics)
- Aulë (J. R. R. Tolkien's The Silmarillion)
- Auriel (Diablo and Heroes of the Storm)
- Authority, The (His Dark Materials)
- Azazeal (Hex)
- Azazel (Sandman)
- Aziraphale (Good Omens)

== B ==
- Bagwis (Filipino comic book superhero)
- Balrogs (J. R. R. Tolkien's The Silmarillion and The Lord of the Rings)
- Balthamos (His Dark Materials)
- Balthazar (Supernatural)
- Bardiel (Neon Genesis Evangelion)
- Bartholomew (Supernatural)
- Bartleby (Dogma)
- Baruch (His Dark Materials)
- Benjamin (Supernatural)
- Blue Wizards (J. R. R. Tolkien's Unfinished Tales )
- Bootsy (Spawn)

== C ==
- Cameron (Angel Wars)
- Cassidy (Angel's Friends)
- Cassiel (Wings of Desire)
- Castiel (Supernatural)
- Celestine (Image Comics)
- Charlie Barkin (All Dogs Go to Heaven)
- Cimentus (Angel's Friends)
- Clara (Touched by an Angel)
- Clara Oddbody (It Happened One Christmas)
- Clarence Odbody (It's a Wonderful Life)
- Cletus (Helluva Boss)
- Collin (Helluva Boss)
- Constantine (Supernatural)
- Conrad (Supernatural)
- Cupidon (Cupidon)
- Celestia (My Little Pony: Friendship is Magic)

== D ==
- Daniel (Supernatural)
- Daniel (Wings of Desire)
- Daniel Grigori (Fallen Series)
- DeBlanc (Preacher comic-book and TV-series)
- The Disciple (Spawn)
- Dolce (Angel's Friends)
- Duma (The Sandman and Lucifer)
- Duma (Supernatural)
- Durin's Bane (J. R. R. Tolkien's The Lord of the Rings)

== E ==
- Efram (Supernatural)
- Eli (Angel Wars)
- Elijah (Supernatural)
- Emily (Hazbin Hotel)
- Eönwë (J. R. R. Tolkien's The Silmarillion)
- Esper (Supernatural)
- Estë (J. R. R. Tolkien's The Silmarillion)
- Esther (Supernatural)
- Ezekiel (Supernatural)

== F ==
- Felicia Aldreen (Dominion)
- Fiore (Preacher comic-book and TV-series)
- Flagstaff (Supernatural)
- Furiad (Dominion)
- Faith

== G ==
- Gabi (Angel's Friends)
- Gabriel (The Binding of Isaac: Rebirth)
- Gabriel (Legion and Dominion)
- Gabriel (Good Fortune) played by Keanu Reeves
- Gabriel (Good Omens)
- Gabriel (Hellblazer and Constantine)
- Gabriel (The Prophecy)
- Gabriel (Supernatural)
- Gabriel (Ultrakill)
- Gadreel (Supernatural)
- Gabrielle (Spawn)
- Gaghiel (Neon Genesis Evangelion)
- Gail (Supernatural)
- Gandalf Wizards (J. R. R. Tolkien's The Lord of the Rings and The Hobbit)
- Godsend (Spawn)
- Gloria (Touched by an Angel)
- Gosei Angels (Tensou Sentai Goseiger)
- Gothmog (J. R. R. Tolkien's The Silmarillion)
- Galaxia

== H ==
- Hadriel (Diablo)
- Hael (Supernatural)
- Hannah (Supernatural)
- Henry (Touched by an Angel)
- Hester (Supernatural)

== I ==
- Imogen (Constantine)
- Imperius (Diablo and Heroes of the Storm)
- Inarius (Diablo)
- Indra (Supernatural)
- Ingrid (Supernatural)
- Inias (Supernatural)
- Ion (Supernatural)
- Irene (Angel's Friends)
- Ireul (Neon Genesis Evangelion)
- Ishim (Supernatural)
- Islington (Neverwhere novel and TV-series)
- Israfel (Neon Genesis Evangelion)
- Itherael (Diablo)
- Ithuriel (Paradise Lost and other fiction)
- Izual (Diablo)

== J ==
- Janus (The Tomb of Dracula)
- Jaza (Angel Wars)
- Jessica (Supernatural)
- Jonah (Supernatural)
- Joshua (Supernatural)
- Yoshiya "Joshua" Kiryu (The World Ends with You)
- Josiah (Supernatural)

== K ==
- Kathleen (Touched by an Angel)
- Keenie (Helluva Boss)
- Kelvin (Supernatural)
- Kira (Angel Wars)
- Khan Maykr (Doom video game series)

== L ==
- Leliel (Neon Genesis Evangelion)
- Leo Wyatt (Charmed); a type of angel known as a "whitelighter"
- Liandra (Fallen Angel)
- Lilin (Neon Genesis Evangelion)
- Lilith (Neon Genesis Evangelion)
- Lily (Supernatural)
- Loki (Dogma)
- Lórien (J. R. R. Tolkien's The Silmarillion)
- Louis (Dominion)
- Lucemon (Digimon)
- Lucifer (Dominion)
- Lucifer (Supernatural)
- Lucifer Morningstar (Hazbin Hotel)
- Lucifer Samael Morningstar (The Sandman and Lucifer comic-book and TV-series)
- Luke (Obey Me)
- Lyrae (Dominion)
- Lunar
- Lute (Hazbin Hotel)

== M ==
- Mabel (Angel's Friends)
- Maiar (J. R. R. Tolkien's The Silmarillion and The Lord of the Rings)
- Malachi (Supernatural)
- Malthael (Diablo and Heroes of the Storm)
- Mandos (J. R. R. Tolkien's The Silmarillion)
- Manny (Constantine (TV series))
- Manwë (J. R. R. Tolkien's The Silmarillion)
- Maribel (Supernatural)
- Matarael (Neon Genesis Evangelion)
- Melanie Beeby (Angels Unlimited)
- Melian (J. R. R. Tolkien's The Silmarillion)
- Melkor, also known as Morgoth (J. R. R. Tolkien's The Silmarillion)
- Metatron (Dogma)
- Metatron (Good Omens)
- Metatron (His Dark Materials)
- Metatron (Supernatural)
- Michael (Legion and Dominion)
- Michael (Supernatural)
- Michael Demiurgos (Lucifer)
- Mike (What If...)
- Mike the Messenger (Spawn)
- Miki (Angel's Friends)
- Monica (Touched by an Angel)
- Morgan (Angel Wars)
- Muriel (Supernatural)
- Muriel (Good Omens)
- Maykrs (including the Seraphim subspecies) (Doom video game series)

== N ==
- Naomi (Supernatural)
- Nathaniel (Supernatural)
- Nessa (J. R. R. Tolkien's The Silmarillion)
- Noma Banks (Dominion)

== O ==
- Omnia (Angel's Friends)
- Orion (Sleepy Hollow (TV series))
- Oromë (J. R. R. Tolkien's The Silmarillion)
- Ossë (J. R. R. Tolkien's The Silmarillion)

== P ==
- Paladin (Angel Wars)
- Panty (Panty and Stocking with Garterbelt)
- Sir Pentious (Hazbin Hotel)
- Saint Peter (Hazbin Hotel)
- Phil (Touched by an Angel)
- Pit and Dark Pit (Kid Icarus)
- Power (Ultrakill)
- Providence (Ultrakill)
- Purah (Supernatural)
- Pygar (Barbarella)

== R ==
- Rachel (Supernatural)
- Radagast Wizards (J. R. R. Tolkien's The Lord of the Rings)
- Raf (Angel's Friends)
- Ramiel (Neon Genesis Evangelion)
- Ramuel (Angel Wars)
- Raphael (Dominion)
- Redeemer (Spawn)
- Raphael (Shadowmancer)
- Raphael (Supernatural)
- Raziel (various)
- Rebecca (Supernatural)
- Remiel (The Sandman and Lucifer)
- Roan (Dominion)
- Ruby Gloom (Ruby Gloom)
- Ruth (Touched by an Angel)

== S ==
- Samandriel (Supernatural)
- Sachiel (Neon Genesis Evangelion)
- Samael (Touched by an Angel)
- Sahaquiel (Neon Genesis Evangelion)
- Sandalphon (Good Omens)
- Sandalphon (Neon Genesis Evangelion)
- Saruman Wizards (J. R. R. Tolkien's The Lord of the Rings)
- Sauron Wizards (J. R. R. Tolkien's The Lord of the Rings and The Silmarillion)
- SCP-001, also known as The Gate Guardian (SCP Foundation)
- Sera (Hazbin Hotel)
- Seraziel (Diablo)
- Shamshel (Neon Genesis Evangelion)
- Shaymin (Pokémon)
- Simon (The Prophecy)
- Simeon (Obey Me)
- Sophia (Supernatural)
- The Speaker of God (Hazbin Hotel)
- Stocking (Panty and Stocking with Garterbelt)
- Samur Maykr / Dr. Samuel Hayden (Doom video game series)
- Swift (Angel Wars)

== T ==
- Tabris (Neon Genesis Evangelion)
- Taylor (Touched by an Angel)
- Tamiel (Supernatural)
- Terence (Angel's Friends)
- Tess (Touched by an Angel)
- Thaddeus (Supernatural)
- Theo (Supernatural)
- Tiffany (Spawn)
- Tulkas (J. R. R. Tolkien's The Silmarillion)
- Tyco (Angel's Friends)
- Tyrael (Diablo and Heroes of the Storm)
- Tyrone (Angel's Friends)

== U ==
- Uinen (J. R. R. Tolkien's The Silmarillion)
- Ulmo (J. R. R. Tolkien's The Silmarillion)
- Urie (Angel's Friends)
- Uriel (Dominion)
- Uriel (Good Omens)
- Uriel (Lucifer)
- Uriel (Supernatural)
- Uriel (The Binding of Isaac: Rebirth)
- Uriel (The Dresden Files)
- Usiel (The Prophecy)

== V ==
- Vaggie / Vaggi (Hazbin Hotel)
- Vairë (J. R. R. Tolkien's The Silmarillion)
- Valar (J. R. R. Tolkien's The Silmarillion)
- Valak (The Conjuring Universe)
- Vána (J. R. R. Tolkien's The Silmarillion)
- Varda (J. R. R. Tolkien's The Silmarillion)
- Virgil (Supernatural)
- Virtue (Ultrakill)

== W ==
- Whis (Dragon Ball)

== X ==
- Xaphania (His Dark Materials)
- Xas (The Vintner's Luck and The Angel's Cut)

== Y ==
- Yaerius (Diablo)
- Yavanna (J. R. R. Tolkien's The Silmarillion)

== Z ==
- Zachariah (Supernatural)
- Zadkiel (Marvel Comics)
- Zauriel (DC Comics)
- Zera (Spawn)
- Zeruel (Neon Genesis Evangelion)

== See also ==
- Films about angels
- List of demons in fiction
- List of angels in theology
