= Intermission: the Greatest Hits =

Greatest hits album by DC Talk
- Released: November 21, 2000
- Recorded: 1992–2000
- Genre: Christian rock; Christian hip hop; pop rock; rap rock; alternative rock
- Length: 79:51
- Label: ForeFront

DC Talk chronology
Supernatural (1998)	Intermission: the Greatest Hits (2000)	Solo (2001)

Professional ratings
Review scores
Source	Rating
Jesus Freak Hideout	4/5 stars
dcTalkUnite	A+

Intermission: the Greatest Hits (often just called Intermission) is a compilation album released by DC Talk. It features songs from their studio albums from Free at Last to Supernatural. It also contains three new tracks: "Chance", "Sugar Coat It" and a remix of "Say the Words".

== Track listing ==
Album release
No.	Title	Originally from	Length
1.	"Say the Words (Now) - (Remix)"	Free at Last (1992)	4:41
2.	"Colored People"	Jesus Freak (1995)	4:24
3.	"Jesus Is Just Alright"	Free at Last (1992)	4:20
4.	"Between You and Me"	Jesus Freak (1995)	5:01
5.	"Mind's Eye"	Jesus Freak (1995)	5:07
6.	"Consume Me"	Supernatural (1998)	4:52
7.	"My Will"	Exodus (1998)	5:25
8.	"In the Light"	Jesus Freak (1995)	4:55
9.	"Mr. Morgan (Morgan Act I)"	new recording	1:16
10.	"Socially Acceptable"	Free at Last (1992)	3:46
11.	"Luv Is a Verb"	Free at Last (1992)	4:47
12.	"Supernatural"	Supernatural (1998)	3:55
13.	"Jesus Freak"	Jesus Freak (1995)	3:59
14.	"The Hardway" (Remix)	Free at Last (1992)	4:47
15.	"What if I Stumble"	Jesus Freak (1995)	5:01
16.	"I Wish We'd All Been Ready"	Jesus Freak (Single) (1995)	4:55
17.	"Chance"	new song	3:42
18.	"Sugar Coat It"	new song	3:59
19.	"Mrs. Morgan (Morgan Act II)"	new recording	0:52
Total length:			79:44
