= 25th GMA Dove Awards =

US music awards ceremony in 1994

- Date: April 28, 1994
- Location: Grand Ole Opry House, Nashville, Tennessee
- Hosted by: Amy Grant

The 25th Annual GMA Dove Awards were held on April 28, 1994, recognizing accomplishments of musicians for the year 1993. The show was held at the Grand Ole Opry House in Nashville, Tennessee, and was hosted by Amy Grant.

== Award recipients ==
=== Artists ===
- Artist of the Year
  - Michael English
- New Artist of the Year
  - Point of Grace
- Group of the Year
  - 4Him
- Male Vocalist of the Year
  - Michael English
- Female Vocalist of the Year
  - Twila Paris
- Songwriter of the Year
  - Steven Curtis Chapman
- Producer of the Year
  - Wayne Kirkpatrick

=== Songs ===
- Song of the Year
  - “In Christ Alone”; Shawn Craig, Donald Koch
- Rap/Hip Hop Recorded Song of the Year
  - "Socially Acceptable"; Free at Last; dc Talk
- Rock Recorded Song of the Year
  - "Jesus Is Just Alright"; Free at Last; dc Talk
- Pop/Contemporary Recorded Song of the Year
  - “Go There With You”; The Great Adventure; Steven Curtis Chapman
- Hard Music Recorded Song of the Year
  - “Psychedelic Super Jesus”; Snakes in the Playground; Bride
- Southern Gospel Recorded Song of the Year
  - "Satisfied"; The Gaither Vocal Band
- Inspirational Recorded Song of the Year
  - "Holding Out Hope To You"; Hope; Michael English
- Country Recorded Song of the Year
  - "There But for the Grace of God"; Love Is Strong; Paul Overstreet
- Traditional Gospel Recorded Song of the Year
  - "Why We Sing"; Kirk Franklin and the Family; Kirk Franklin
- Contemporary Gospel Recorded Song of the Year
  - "Sold Out"; Start All Over; Helen Baylor

=== Albums ===
- Rock Album of the Year
  - Wake-Up Call; Petra
- Pop/Contemporary Album of the Year
  - Hope; Michael English
- Hard Music Album of the Year
  - Tamplin; Ken Tamplin
- Contemporary Gospel Album of the Year
  - Start All Over; Helen Baylor
- Traditional Gospel Album of the Year
  - Kirk Franklin and the Family; Kirk Franklin
- Inspirational Album of the Year
  - The Season of Love; 4Him
- Southern Gospel Album of the Year
  - Southern Classics; Gaither Vocal Band
- Country Album of the Year
  - Walk On; Bruce Carroll
- Instrumental Album of the Year
  - Psalms, Hymns, & Spiritual Songs; Kurt Kaiser
- Praise & Worship Album of the Year
  - Songs from the Loft; Susan Ashton, Gary Chapman, Ashley Cleveland, Amy Delaine, Amy Grant, Kim Hill, Michael James, Wes King, Donna McElroy, and Michael W. Smith
- Children's Music Album of the Year
  - Come to the Cradle; Michael Card
- Musical Album
  - God with Us; Don Moen, Tom Fettke, Tom Hartley, Jack Hayford, and Camp Kirkland
- Choral Collection Album
  - Al Denson Youth Chorus Book, Vol. III; Dave Spear and Al Denson
- Recorded Music Packaging of the Year
  - The Wonder Years 1983-1993; Michael W. Smith

=== Videos ===
- Long Form Music Video of the Year
  - The Great Adventure; Steven Curtis Chapman
- Short Form Music Video of the Year
  - "Hand on My Shoulder"; Sandi Patti
