= Redemption Songs =

Studio album by Jars of Clay
- Released: March 22, 2005
- Recorded: 2005
- Studio: Sputnik SoundNashville, Tennessee; East Iris Studios, Nashville, Tennessee
- Genre: Christian rock, folk rock
- Length: 54:08
- Label: Essential
- Producer: Jars of Clay, Mitch Dane

Jars of Clay chronology
Roots & Wings (2005)	Redemption Songs (2005)	iTunes Originals – Jars of Clay (2005)

Singles from Redemption Songs
- 1. "God Will Lift Up Your Head" Released: 2005

Professional ratings
Review scores
Source	Rating
AllMusic	3/5 stars
Christianity Today	4/5 stars
Cross Rhythms	8/10 stars
Jesus Freak Hideout	4/5 stars

Redemption Songs is the sixth full-length studio album by Jars of Clay. It was released by Essential Records on March 22, 2005.

== Overview ==
Redemption Songs is a collection of reinvented hymns and spiritual songs. As part of a church community that believed passionately the blessing of understanding the story of redemption through early church songs and ancient hymns, Jars of Clay found themselves a part of a growing renaissance, one that inspired them to write new songs using the rich hymn texts as the foundation. This renaissance was the beginning of Redemption Songs, a blend of familiar hymns, spirituals, and ancient texts.

== Collaboration ==
The band enlists vocals of friends including the Blind Boys of Alabama ("Nothing But the Blood", "On Jordan's Stormy River Banks I Stand"), Sarah Kelly ("I'll Fly Away") and Martin Smith ("Let Us Love and Sing and Wonder"). It was recorded at the band's Nashville-based Sputnik Studio, and is co-produced by the band members and long-time collaborator, Mitch Dane.

== Track listing ==
No.	Title	Length
1.	"God Be Merciful to Me (Psalm 51)"	4:31
2.	"I Need Thee Every Hour"	3:47
3.	"God Will Lift Up Your Head"	4:22
4.	"I'll Fly Away" (featuring Sarah Kelly)	4:42
5.	"Nothing But the Blood" (featuring the Blind Boys of Alabama)	4:13
6.	"Let Us Love and Sing and Wonder" (featuring Martin Smith of Delirious?)	4:23
7.	"O Come and Mourn with Me Awhile"	4:04
8.	"Hiding Place"	4:06
9.	"Jesus, I Lift My Eyes"	3:28
10.	"It Is Well with My Soul"	3:54
11.	"On Jordan's Stormy Banks I Stand" (featuring the Blind Boys of Alabama)	4:32
12.	"Thou Lovely Source of True Delight"	4:31
13.	"They'll Know We Are Christians by Our Love"	3:02
Total length:		53:35

== Personnel ==
Jars of Clay

- Dan Haseltine
- Charlie Lowell
- Stephen Mason
- Matt Odmark

Additional musicians

- Aaron Sands – bass
- Ben Mize – drums (1, 3–9, 11, 12, 13)
- Bryan Owings – drums (2)
- John Catchings – cello (9, 12)
- Andrew Osenga – backing vocals (3)
- Laura Taylor – backing vocals (3)
- Sarah Kelly – backing vocals (4)
- The Blind Boys of Alabama – backing vocals (4, 11)
- Martin Smith – backing vocals (6)

Production

- Robert Beeson – executive producer
- Jars of Clay – producers
- Mitch Dane – producer, engineer, mixing (2, 10, 13)
- Jacquire King – engineer, mixing (1, 3–9, 11, 12)
- Andy Hunt – second engineer
- Mike Odmark – second engineer
- Sang Park – second engineer
- Laura Taylor – second engineer
- Richard Dodd – mastering at RichardDodd.com, Nashville, Tennessee
- John Wesley – translation
- Michelle Pearson – A&R production
- Stephanie McBrayer – art direction
- Tim Parker – art direction, design, cover art
- Jimmy Abegg – photography
- Star Klem – stylist
- Alexis Abegg – hair, make-up

== Charts ==
Chart (2005)	Peak position
US Billboard 200	71

== Awards ==
In 2006, Redemption Songs won a Dove Award for Recorded Music Packaging of the Year at the 37th GMA Dove Awards. It was also nominated for Pop/Contemporary Album of the Year.
