= Welcome to the Freak Show =

Live album by DC Talk
- Released: August 26, 1997
- Recorded: 1997
- Genre: Christian music
- Length: 78:22
- Label: ForeFront
- Producer: Toby McKeehan

DC Talk chronology
Jesus Freak (1995)	Welcome to the Freak Show (1997)	Supernatural (1998)

Professional ratings
Review scores
Source	Rating
AllMusic	3/5 stars
Jesus Freak Hideout	3.5/5 stars

Welcome to the Freak Show is a live audio and video recording by DC Talk. Chronicling the Jesus Freak Tour in the spring of 1996, they were released separately two months apart in 1997 on CD and VHS, respectively. A DVD version was later released in 2003. Each version has been certified gold by the RIAA (audio for 500,000 units and video for 50,000 units sold). Track listings differ slightly between the two. Select videos included a bonus audio disc that remains one of the rarest recordings in the DC Talk catalog. The audio version won the 1998 Grammy Award for Best Rock Gospel Album.

== Release dates ==
- VHS June 17, 1997
- CD August 26, 1997
- DVD October 21, 2003

== Jesus Freak Tour ==
Jesus Freak released in November 1995 to first-week sales of 85,000 units, a record for a Christian album at the time. This placed it at No. 16 on the Billboard 200 chart. Anticipation was already high for the scheduled 65-city tour set to begin in the Spring of 1996, but DC Talk's record label, ForeFront Records launched a massive marketing blitz to increase awareness. The tour debuted to a sold-out crowd at the Bren Center on the University of California Irvine campus. It later included stops in several European countries (which is documented in the video). Audio Adrenaline opened for DC Talk on the tour.

== Audio version ==
The audio version was recorded in the Pacific Northwest, more specifically in Portland, Oregon and Tacoma, Washington, as evidenced by the band dialogue in several places, such as following "Like It, Love It, Need It" (Michael and Kevin banter about what they like about Seattle). Of notable absence is "Just Between You and Me" which was the album's biggest mainstream hit. This song's rise on the Billboard charts was a result of the partnership with Virgin Records that came after the close of the tour. "Between You and Me" was not played until the last dates of the tour, which was after this recording had taken place.

=== Track listing ===
Album release
No.	Title	Original studio recording on	Length
1.	"Help!" (The Beatles cover)	-	1:02
2.	"So Help Me God"	Jesus Freak	4:27
3.	"Luv Is a Verb"	Free at Last	4:54
4.	"Like It, Love It, Need It"	Jesus Freak	7:58
5.	"Colored People"	Jesus Freak	4:47
6.	"Jesus Is Just Alright"	Free at Last	5:58
7.	"What If I Stumble"	Jesus Freak	6:12
8.	"In the Light" (Charlie Peacock cover)	Jesus Freak	5:02
9.	"Mind's Eye"	Jesus Freak	6:04
10.	"It's the End of the World as We Know It" (R.E.M. cover)	-	7:18
11.	"Day By Day"	Jesus Freak	4:35
12.	"Walls"	Nu Thang	2:16
13.	"Time Is..."	Free at Last	3:51
14.	"Alas, My Love"	Jesus Freak	2:12
15.	"The Hardway"	Free at Last	5:43
16.	"Jesus Freak"	Jesus Freak	6:03
Total length:			78:22

=== Awards and recognition ===
The audio recording was awarded the 1997 Grammy Award for "Best Rock Gospel Album". It was certified gold by the RIAA (500,000 units sold) on October 25, 2000.

== VHS version ==
=== Track listing ===
1. "Help!" (The Beatles cover)
2. "So Help Me God"
3. "Luv Is a Verb"
4. "Colored People"
5. "Like It, Love It, Need It"
6. "What If I Stumble"
7. "In the Light"
8. "Mind's Eye"
9. "Day by Day"
10. "Walls/Time Is..."
11. "Alas, My Love"
12. "The Hardway"
13. "Jesus Freak"

=== Description ===
The video was filmed in a variety of U.S. locations. This is evidenced by the band members wearing different clothes within the same songs. Footage was obviously spliced together. As with the audio version, dc Talk's mainstream hit "Between You and Me" had yet to be added to the set list at the time of recording. "Jesus Is Just Alright" and "It's the End of the World as We Know It (And I Feel Fine)" were left off the video recording due to time constraints. The video, however, added short segments between songs that were filmed at various stops in Europe.

=== Awards and recognition ===
The video was certified gold by the RIAA (50,000 units sold) on March 2, 1998.

== DVD Version ==
=== Track listing ===
The DVD has the main feature of the VHS versions but adds the following bonus features:

1. "Jesus Freak" (music video)
2. "Just Between You and Me" (music video)
3. "Colored People" (music video)

== Bonus disc ==
Included with an extremely select number of videos in 1997 was a four-song bonus disc. The cover reads "Limited Edition EP" although is more commonly called the "Freak Show Bonus Disc" among collectors of dc Talk's more rare releases. It contains the extremely rare release of "Colored People (Organic Mix)".

=== Track listing ===
1. "In the Light" (Welcome to the Freak Show Live Version)
2. "Day by Day" (Welcome to the Freak Show Live Version)
3. "Colored People" (Organic Mix)
4. "What Have We Become?" (Jesus Freak Album Version)

== Credits ==
dc Talk

- Toby McKeehan – vocals
- Michael Tait – vocals
- Kevin Max – vocals

Live band

- Jason Halbert – keyboards, organ
- Brent Barcus – guitars
- Mark Townsend – guitars
- Otto Price – bass
- Will Denton – drums
- Marvin Sims – percussion

Production

- Dan Brock – executive producer
- Eddie DeGarmo – executive producer
- Toby McKeehan – producer, mixing
- John Hampton – mixing
- Tim Roberge – engineer
- Robert Tassi – engineer
- Stan Coty – assistant engineer
- Joe Hayden – assistant engineer
- Tim Roberts – assistant engineer
- Jeff Boggs – editing
- Damon Riley – editing assistant
- Erik Wolf – mastering
- Louis Leluca – photography
- Martha Neumann – photography
- Tom Davis – art direction
- Kevin Max Smith – poetry, art direction
