= 4th Avenue Jones =

American alternative hip hop band

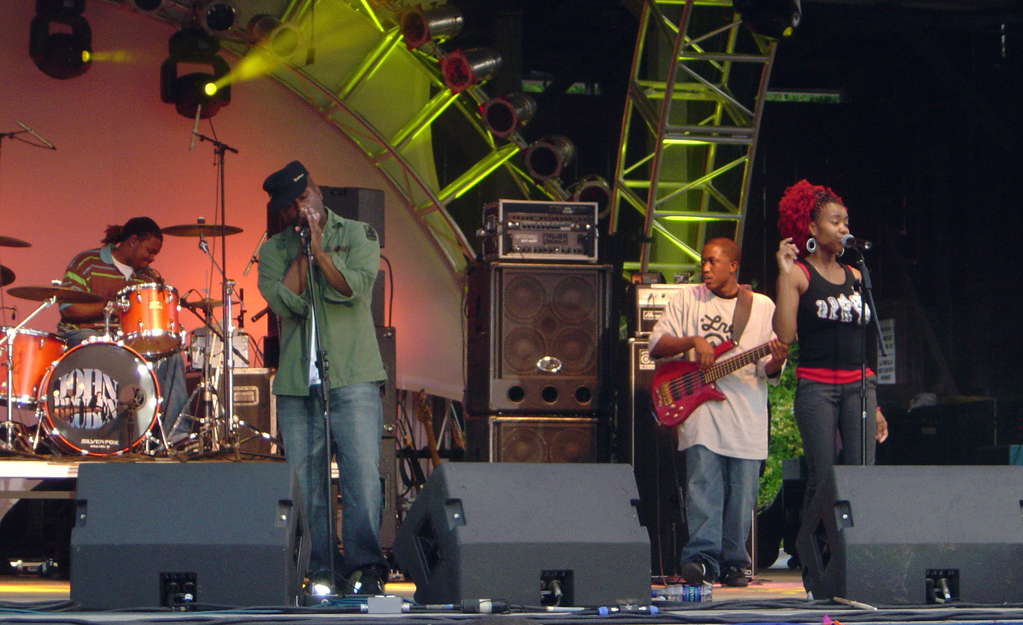
- 4th Avenue Jones at the Alive Festival on June 21, 2005

Background information
- Origin: Los Angeles, California, U.S.
- Genres: Hip hop, alternative hip hop, neo soul, alternative rock, Christian hip hop, gospel
- Years active: 1997–2006
- Labels: Lookalive, Interscope, Gotee
- Members: Ahmad; Tena Jones; Gailybird; Timmy Shakes; Phat Al; Dee
- Past members: Jabu (a.k.a. Senoj Da Baqwordz); Alex Stiff; Greg Boasberg; KP; Drummy Dave Dumonde

4th Avenue Jones (originally 4th Avenue Jones' and sometimes credited as 4th Ave. Jones') was an American alternative hip hop band based in Los Angeles, California. The band was conceived by Ahmad Ali Lewis, popularly known as Ahmad. The band's name comes from the popular idiom "Keeping up with the Joneses" and the street in South Central Los Angeles where they began their rehearsals.

== Musical career ==
=== The Interscope years ===
After the success of his 1994 platinum single "Back in the Day" as an 18-year-old, Ahmad became frustrated by the corporate politics choking the industry and the "plastic junk" being forced on the masses, and decided to abandon his solo career and form his own label, Lookalive Records. Lookalive was formed to bring together a dream team of gifted musicians who were committed to the art of music.

The vision for the band was conceived in 1997 when Ahmad Jones commenced rehearsals at a house located on 4th Avenue and Jefferson in South Central Los Angeles. In 2000 the band was formed, and the group independently pressed and distributed their first full album No Plan B. Their persistence paid off as their fan base in the Los Angeles area began to grow. Local weekly gigs soon followed, spreading word of the Jones' classic level of showmanship like wildfire throughout the West Coast music scene.

Interscope Records caught wind of the 4th Avenue Jones' buzz, and quickly offered the band a deal. After enthusiastically completing the 2002 Interscope project, No Plan B, Pt. II, the band continued to electrify audiences, sharing the stage with such notables as Sheryl Crow, Macy Gray, The Roots, James Brown, The Black Eyed Peas, Musiq, and others. Sadly, they were kept in touring limbo by the label and the album was never released.

Frustrated, the Jones' eventually earned their release from the label altogether. Fortunately, by the time they returned to independent status, releasing another underground album, Respect, the group had already stamped an influential mark, and their fans stuck with them.

=== After Interscope ===
Inspired with a new vision of things to come, some changes in the band were made. Ahmad enlisted a roster of talent that would position the group for refinement and growth: his wife, Tena Jones on vocals, Tim Stewart aka "Timmy Shakes" on lead guitar, Gailybird on violin, "Phat" Albert Parker on bass, and Derrick "Dee" Calloway on drums.

Their eclectic use of rock-influenced sounds atypical for hip-hop music, especially guitars, was most evident on their first album after leaving Interscope, 2003's compilation Gumbo which introduced the public to their new members, with several band members performing solo tracks on the album.

In 2004, 4th Avenue Jones released their fourth independent album HipRockSoul, and the next year, they released their first Gotee Records-distributed album, titled Stereo: The Evolution of HipRockSoul containing re-mastered and re-mixed tracks from the HipRockSoul album as well as several new songs. After a lot of underground success, this album was the group's mainstream breakout album earning them a Dove Award nomination as well as awards from several Christian and mainstream hip-hop websites.

== Discography ==
=== Albums ===
Year	Title	Label	Chart Positions
Year	Title	Label	Top 200
2000	No Plan B	self-released	—
2002	Respect	self-released	—
2003	No Plan B, Pt. II	Interscope Records	—
2003	Gumbo (Compilation)	self-released	—
2004	HipRockSoul	self-released	—
2005	Stereo: The Evolution of HipRockSoul	Gotee Records	—

=== Singles ===
Year	Title	Chart Positions
Year	Title	R&B/Hip-Hop
2000	"Respect"	10
2002	"Move On"	—
2002	"Do Re Mi"	—
2005	"Stereo"	—

4th Avenue Jones has also recorded a cover of "Jesus Freak" by Christian rock/pop group dc Talk, which appears on the compilation album Freaked! A Gotee Tribute to dc Talk's "Jesus Freak".
