= Hip Hope Hits =

Compilation album by Various artists
- Released: From 2004
- Genre: Christian rap
- Label: Gotee Records

Hip Hope Hits is an annual collection of Christian rap songs. The series is produced by tobyMac's Gotee Records. It began as a one off collection titled We Are Hip Hope. In late 2004, the first of the albums in the current format, Hip Hope Hits 2005 was released. It featured many more artists and tracks as well as an enhanced disc featuring a documentary about DJ Maj, a prominent Christian hip hop producer, having produced many tracks on the album.

A DVD of music videos was also released alongside Hip Hope Hits 2005, featuring some of the same tracks and some differing tracks, and also the same documentary. Since then, an album and DVD have been released annually with the latest, Hip Hope Hits 2009, being released on February 3, 2009. The compilations continue to feature more and more tracks or remixes exclusive to Hip Hope and not taken from an artist's own album.

== Awards ==
In 2010, the album Hip Hope Hits 2009 was nominated for a Dove Award for Special Event Album of the Year at the 41st GMA Dove Awards.
