= Supernatural (DC Talk album) =

Studio album by DC Talk
- Released: September 22, 1998
- Recorded: 1997–1998
- Studio: House of Insomnia and Fun Attic Studio, (Franklin, Tennessee); Javelina Studios, The White House and Sixteenth Avenue Sound (Nashville, Tennessee)
- Genre: Christian rock; Christian alternative rock; pop rock
- Length: 56:52
- Label: ForeFront; Virgin
- Producer: Toby McKeehan; Mark Heimermann

DC Talk chronology
Welcome to the Freak Show (1997)	Supernatural (1998)	Intermission: the Greatest Hits (2000)

Professional ratings
Review scores
Source	Rating
AllMusic	2.5/5 stars
Cross Rhythms	9/10 stars
Entertainment Weekly	(B−)
Jesus Freak Hideout	3.5/5 stars
Robert Christgau	(C)
Rolling Stone	3/5 stars

Supernatural is the fifth and final studio album from DC Talk. It debuted on the US Billboard Chart at No. 4, selling 106,213 copies. It was certified platinum three years after its release on February 21, 2002. A remastered edition was released in 2013. It released on vinyl in 2015.

== Track listing ==
Album release
No.	Title	Writer(s)	Length
1.	"Intro"		0:24
2.	"It's Killing Me"	Kevin Max, Toby McKeehan, Michael Tait, Greg Wells	3:56
3.	"Dive"	Mark Heimermann, Max, McKeehan, Tait	4:21
4.	"Consume Me"	Heimermann, Max, McKeehan, Tait	4:51
5.	"My Friend (So Long)"	Mark Hudson, Max, McKeehan, Tait	4:11
6.	"Fearless"	George Cocchini, Heimermann, Max, McKeehan, Tait	5:07
7.	"Godsend"	Chad Chapin, Heimermann, Max, McKeehan, Tait	4:14
8.	"Wanna Be Loved"	Heimermann, Max, McKeehan, Tait	4:15
9.	"The Truth"	Heimermann, Max, McKeehan, Tait	4:25
10.	"Since I Met You"	Heimermann, Max, McKeehan, Tait	5:00
11.	"Into Jesus"	Heimermann, Max, McKeehan, Tait	4:19
12.	"Supernatural"	Heimermann, Max, McKeehan, Tait	4:00
13.	"Red Letters"	Chris Harris, Heimermann, Max, McKeehan, Tait	6:06
14.	"There Is A Treason at Sea"	Max	1:40
Total length:			56:52

No commercial singles were released but there were promotional singles released for "Consume Me", "Into Jesus", "Wanna Be Loved", "Dive", "Supernatural", "My Friend (So Long)" and "Godsend" with them gaining major airplay in their singles market. Billboard Top 40, Alternative Rock radio and AC/CHR. "Consume Me" and "My Friend, So Long" were released as videos as well.

The title track, "Supernatural", is featured on two of the Angel Wars trailers, as well as the main song on the first episode DVD main menu. "Wanna Be Loved" was covered by Chris Sligh on a Season 6 episode of American Idol. "The Truth" was originally recorded for The X-Files: The Album, the soundtrack for The X-Files film Fight the Future, but didn't make the cut.

"Into Jesus" appears on WOW 1999, "Consume Me" appears on WOW 2000 and Commencemix, "Red Letters" appears on WOW Hits 2001.

== Personnel ==
DC Talk

- Toby Mac
- Kevin Max
- Michael Tait

Musicians

- Mark Heimermann
- Rick May
- Brent Barcus
- George Cocchini
- Dann Huff
- Jerry McPherson
- Will Owsley
- Pete Stewart
- Brent Milligan
- Otto Price
- Todd Collins
- Greg Wells
- Scott Williamson
- Tom Howard – string arrangements
- Carl Marsh – string arrangements
- Carl Gorodetzky
- The Nashville String Machine

Production

- Eddie DeGarmo – A&R
- Danny Goodwin – A&R
- Mark Heimermann – producer
- Toby McKeehan – producer
- Todd Robbins – engineer
- Robert "Void" Caprio – additional engineer
- Bryan Lenox – additional engineer
- David Schober – additional engineer
- F. Reid Shippen – additional engineer
- Kent Hitchcock – assistant engineer
- Pete Martinez – assistant engineer
- Mike Purcell – assistant engineer
- Reid "Elemental" Waltz – assistant engineer
- Steve MacMillan – mixing at The Castle (Franklin, Tennessee)
- Joe Costa – mix assistant
- PJ Heimmerman – production manager
- Deborah Norcross – art direction, design
- Alastair Thain – cover photography
- Len Peltier – band photography
