= Jesus Freak (song) =

Single by DC Talk

from the album Jesus Freak
- Released: August 1, 1995
- Recorded: 1995
- Genre: Christian rock; Christian hip-hop; rap rock; grunge
- Length: 4:50
- Label: ForeFront
- Songwriters: Toby McKeehan, Mark Heimermann
- Producers: Toby McKeehan, Mark Heimermann

DC Talk singles chronology
| "The Hardway" (1994) | "Jesus Freak" (1995) | "Between You and Me" (1996) |

"Jesus Freak" is a song by the American contemporary Christian music group DC Talk. Released on August 1, 1995, the song served as the lead radio single from the group's fourth studio album of the same name. The song was written and produced by Toby McKeehan and Mark Heimermann. Lyrically, the song is about standing up for the belief in Jesus Christ in the midst of persecution. Musically, the song has been described as alternative rock and grunge. It received airplay on both contemporary Christian music and alternative rock stations, formats that rarely interact. "Jesus Freak" earned DC Talk three GMA Dove Awards.

== Origin and lyrics ==
After the success of DC Talk's third album, Free at Last (1992), which was based primarily on hip-hop and pop oriented songwriting, the trio decided to innovate their style. Michael Tait, one of the members of DC Talk, said, "I was totally into rock and roll at the time [...] I really wanted to make a rock record." The band decided to focus on more rock-oriented music, with touches of rap and pop interwoven into the mix. Tait later explained, "We wanted to write songs that would hopefully touch a generation." DC Talk member Toby McKeehan, writer of the song's lyrics, wrote the song to be a bold declaration of love for Jesus Christ, even in the midst of persecution. In order to bring the hard-hitting reality of their message to the mainstream, DC Talk combined the raw lyrics with guitar-driven grunge-rock. McKeehan took the song's title from the derogatory 1970s term "Jesus freak" and turned it on its head; he noted that when he was looking up the word "freak" in the dictionary, he saw an entry that said "ardent enthusiast". Since the song and album's release, many of the group's fans have donned products with the term "Jesus Freak".

The first time the band performed the song live, McKeehan only had about a verse written. He later recalled, "We had not yet recorded it for our album, but we had a demo with one verse written. We thought it would be safe to try it [in South Africa]. We could not believe the immediate response it got."

== Composition ==
"Jesus Freak"
30 second sample of "Jesus Freak" from DC Talk's 1995 album Jesus Freak. The sample illustrates the change in style, progressing from a subdued verse to rapped pre-chorus to a grunge chorus.

"Jesus Freak", which follows a "three-part repetitive" song form that is common to the rock genre (i.e. chorus, verse, bridge), opens with four acoustic guitar scraps, establishing the time signature (4/4) and the tempo (roughly 107 bpm). Following this brief count-off, an acoustic guitar begins strumming the main riff in the key of E♭ minor; the guitar is accompanied by faint vocals singing the song's chorus (i.e. "What will people think when they hear that I'm a Jesus Freak?/What will people do when they find that's it's true?"). The guitar then abruptly switches into overdrive, and modulates into the key of F minor. Throughout this portion of the song, the chorus riff is repeated twice on electric guitar, but no main vocals are heard.

During the verses, a sparse electric guitar pattern, which outlines the chord progression, is played. The opening portion of the first verse, according to Jon Radwan, describes "a change in self-concept". The second portion, rapped by McKeehan, describes the story of a street preacher who, "stood on a box in the middle of the city and he claimed he had a dream". The first portion of the second verse discusses self-sacrifice and "the killing of an old self that feared social judgement" for being a Christian. The verse then shifts into a rap about John the Baptist, re-reads "John a Christian martyr instead of a Jewish political dissident." A repetition of the chorus follows, succeeded by a melodic breakdown and a dissonant guitar solo. Following a final play-through of the chorus, the feedback-laden conclusion ends abruptly.

Musically, the song has been described as alternative rock and grunge, with many reviews noting a similarity with the sound of Nirvana. Radwan argues that the song contains "direct allusions to hit songs by Nirvana", and that the drum flam entrance to the song and the chord progression in the verses recall "Smells like Teen Spirit" and "Heart-Shaped Box", respectively. According to the Encyclopedia of American Gospel Music, "Jesus Freak" is believed to be one of the first songs to link alternative rock and rap rock in CCM.

== Music video ==
The opening scene of "Jesus Freak" illustrating Simon Maxwell's dark treatment of the video, the filming style, and the Christian symbolism.

The music video for "Jesus Freak" was directed by Simon Maxwell, who also worked on the music video for "Hurt" by Nine Inch Nails. Maxwell's treatment of the video, reminiscent of his work with Nine Inch Nails, features footage of Christian imagery such as doves and crosses mixed with stock footage of riots, book burnings, hate crimes, a metallic hammer and sickle, footage of the Russian Revolution, footage of one of Hitler's speeches and an accompanying Nazi propaganda film projected onto a screen that includes Nazi burnings of "degenerate" materials. Interspersed between the stock footage is video of the band performing the song in a darkened room.

Although the song and video are, on the surface, about expressing one's belief in Jesus Christ, the band later commented that the song could also be a metaphor for the "preservation of standing up for what you believe in – even in the midst of persecution." McKeehan later said that the point of the video was to "push the envelope" for the Christian rock community, and indeed, the song and video proved controversial. Although the song and video were an earnest attempt to "declare a single-hearted faithfulness in Christ in an age when such devotion strikes many as the freakiest kind of fanaticism," some of the more conservative Christian community members disapproved of the video. The song however, was highly successful on Z Music and managed to achieve air time on MTV.

== Release and reception ==
Professional ratings
Review scores
| Source | Rating |
|---|---|
| Allmusic | 3/5 stars |
| Jesus Freak Hideout | 5/5 stars |

"Jesus Freak", which served as the lead-off single for the album of the same name, was released in 1995 to alternative and modern rock stations, the band's first venture into these radio formats. Because the song – which is defined by a dark, grunge sound – was released during an era when alternative rock was ruling the airwaves, the song was played on some non-Christian stations. As part of the promotion strategy for the song, InterLinc, a Nashville-based Christian music promotion company, sent out over 4,000 copies of the CD single to youth pastors, along with Bible study material. The single initially charted on the Bubbling Under Hot 100 Singles at No. 25 with little mainstream radio assistance. The song peaked at No. 10 on this chart. The single also peaked at No. 1 on CCM Magazine's rock chart.

Entertainment Weekly editor Laura Jamison, in a review for the Jesus Freak album, said that DC Talk, "successfully, if derivatively, combines textured vocals, aggressive guitar, and solid songwriting, especially on [...] the raucous title track." In a review of "Jesus Freak", the Chicago Tribune said "In considering the group's artistic merits, it's time to bury the over-burdened label 'Christian band' [...] DC Talk deserves to be judged by a different standard."

In addition to "Colored People" and "Between You and Me", "Jesus Freak" was considered instrumental in breaking DC Talk into the mainstream. In 1996, the song won GMA Dove Award for Song of the Year and Rock Recorded Song of the Year. The music video for the song later won the award for Short Form Music Video of the Year in 1997.

== Other releases ==
Various versions of "Jesus Freak" have appeared on several DC Talk official releases, including the band's greatest hits album Intermission. A live version of "Jesus Freak" was included on the 1997 live release Welcome to the Freak Show (1997). A short, comedic reprise, performed by co-producer Todd Collins, is included on the Jesus Freak album. In addition, a remix of the song, available on the "Jesus Freak" single, entitled "Jesus Freak" (Gotee Bros. Freaked Out remix) features a more hip-hop sound, reminiscent of the band's third album, Free at Last. On August 3, 2010, the single was released as downloadable content for Rock Band.

=== Cover versions and remixes ===
The Christian rock band Newsboys recorded a cover of "Jesus Freak" and released it on their 2010 album Born Again. On the DC Talk tribute album, Freaked! (2006), both 4th Avenue Jones and Chasing Victory recorded covers of this particular song. "Jesus Freak" has also been covered by Larry Norman. McKeehan, under his stage name TobyMac, also recorded a cover version of the song for his album Alive and Transported. On January 1, 2021, Owl City released a remix the song. On April 2, 2025, Josiah Queen and tobyMac released a version of the song.

== Track listing ==
CD single
| No. | Title | Writer(s) | Length |
|---|---|---|---|
| 1. | "Jesus Freak" | Mark Heimermann, Toby McKeehan | 4:50 |
| 2. | "Jesus Freak" (Gotee Bros. Freaked Out remix) | Mark Heimermann, Toby McKeehan | 4:42 |
| 3. | "I Wish We'd All Been Ready" | Larry Norman | 3:45 |
| 4. | "Jesus Is Just Alright" (live) | Arthur Reynolds | 4:51 |
| Total length: | | | 18:08 |

== Charts ==
| Chart (1995) | Peak position |
|---|---|
| US Bubbling Under Hot 100 (Billboard) | 10 |
| US Christian Rock (CCM Magazine) | 1 |

== Album credits ==
Personnel

- Toby McKeehan – vocals
- Michael Tait – vocals
- Kevin Max – vocals
- Oran Thornton – guitar
- Dann Huff – guitar
- Sean Turner – guitar
- John Painter – bass guitar
- David L. Huff – drums
- Todd Collins – cowbell, drums
- Mark Heimermann – double bass, Hammond B-3

Production

- Toby McKeehan – producer
- Mark Heimermann – programming, producer
- Todd Collins – programming
- Joe Baldridge – engineer
- Pat Murphy – engineer assistant
- Chuck Linder – engineer assistant

== Accolades ==
| Year | Publication | Country | Accolade | Rank |
|---|---|---|---|---|
| 2006 | CCM Magazine | United States | 100 Greatest Songs in Christian Music | 2 |
