= Angel Wars =

- Starring: Dave Thomas; M.J. Muldoon; Doug Stone; John Daniels; Justin Moran; Nanci Johnson
- Music by: Michael J. Nelson
- Distributed by: EMI, Telestory
- Release date: October 28, 2004
- Country: United States
- Language: English

Angel Wars is an animated action adventure series from TeleStory TOONS and EMI CMG and more recently Twentieth Century Fox. Since its introduction in late 2004, the series has presented Christian-based storylines through 3D animation provided by the, LA based Backyard Digital Studios.

The CGI film series, officially titled "Angel Wars Guardian Force," centers on the fundamental theme of the battle between good versus evil. Its target audience is individuals aged six years and older. The characters featured in the series are a mixture of Biblical and fictional angels.

The series is a departure from the traditional version of angels such as envisioned by Gustave Doré; the almost mech-armoured angels in this series are more futuristic with fantastical chariot vehicles and glowing weaponry.

The Guardian Force, headed by the biblical archangel Michael, are briefed by the unseen Maker, aboard an airship called The Seven. They depart by spreading their wings and flying down to Earth where they battle demonic fallen angels that seek to corrupt humanity. The student angels (Anawim) use wingboards until they earn their wings. The angels and demons (like Morg) are invisible to the human eye as they exist on a spiritual plane, unless they take human form. However, the angels can affect the physical world in order to miraculously save humans from danger.

== DVDs ==
=== Angel Wars Episode 1 ===
- "About Face" – Eli and Kira, two junior members of the Guardian Force must grow up in a hurry when their first mission to earth takes a detour, pitting them against Morg, a deadly but long forgotten foe. In a race against time, the Guardians must uncover the source of Morg's power, defeat his crafty minions, and stop the ruin of a mortal life, all while learning to work together.
- Video: Sanctus Real – "Everything About You"
- Falling Up – "Broken Heart"
- Kutless – "Not What You See"
- Songs: Sanctus Real – "Alone"
- Newsboys – "Entertaining Angels"
- dc Talk – "Supernatural"
- Release date: October 28, 2004
- DVD run time: 60 min.
- Episode run time: 33 min.

=== Angel Wars Episode 2 ===
- "Over the Moon" – With each of the Guardians engaged on their assignments, Morg moves quickly to his hideaway base where he prepares to unleash a devastating blow against humankind with a missile. Drawn together by providence, the Guardian Force must uncover the secrets of their old foe and stop him before the earth is changed forever.
- Video: TobyMac – "Gone"
- 4th Avenue Jones – "My Stereo"
- GRITS – "Hitting Curves"
- Release date: August 30, 2005
- DVD run time: 108 min.
- Episode run time: 38 min.
- How to draw Angel Wars
- Release date: November 22, 2005
- DVD run time: 120 min.

=== Angel Wars Episode 3 ===
- "Grace and Glory" – With his angel hostage in tow, the archangel Michael on his tail, and a symbiotic stone taking control of his body, the demon Morg flees to the underworld where he quickly establishes a new base of operations. Feeding off the demon's pride, the symbiont stone slowly transforms Morg into an all-consuming beast with the power to threaten both Heaven and Earth. Facing impossible odds, it's up to Michael and the Guardian Force to prove the old Proverb true: that pride comes before the fall.
- Video: Hawk Nelson – "The One Thing I Have Left"
- Sanctus Real – "I'm Not Alright"
- Kutless – "Shut Me Out"
- Songs: Sanctus Real – "The Face of Love"
- Release date: September 26, 2006
- Episode run time: 33 min.
- Bonus Content: 80 minutes

=== Angel Wars Episode 4 ===
- "The Messengers" – 5 stories in One DVD:
- "Some Sound Advice" – When Eli says that learning music is a waste of time, Paladin tells him the story of how he once used music to save the day and how that feat earned him his wings.
- "A Bone To Pick" – An elderly demon resurrects his brutish son to rule in his stead, but he instead goes on a rampage that Eli and Kira must put a stop to.
- "Be Careful What You Wish For" – Eli finally gains his "wings", but they come at a huge cost.
- "Stick Together" – After an argument splits them up, Eli and Kira discover a hive of demonic insects.
- "Return to Sender" – Swift and the Messenger Archangel Ramuel are captured by demons and it's up to Eli, Kira, and Ramuel's unsure protege Cameron to save the day by delivering a crucial message before time runs out.
- DVD run time: 89 min.

== Characters ==
Name	Color	Rank	Wingspan	Height	Weight	Vehicle	Weapon	Actor/Actress	Spanish Voice
Michael	Gold	Archangel	16 cubits	6 ft 6in	260 lbs	The Seven	Sword	Dave Thomas	Marcos Witt
Arianna	Purple	Guardian	13.5 cubits	6 ft 1in	140 lbs	Wings	Spear	M.J. Muldoon	Maria del Sol
Paladin	Blue	Guardian	14.5 cubits	6 ft 4in	230 lbs	Flycycle	Starblades	Doug Stone	Pablo Olivares
Swift	Orange	Guardian	20 cubits	7 ft 3in	350 lbs	Hover Tank	Hammer	John Daniels	Coalo Zamorano
Eli	Yellow	Anawim	N/A	5 ft 9in	150 lbs	Wing Board	Sword	Justin Moran	Alex Campos
Kira	Green	Anawim	N/A	5 ft 6in	110 lbs	Wing Board	Crossbow	Nanci Johnson	Lali Torres
Morgan/Morg	Amber	Fallen Angel	16 cubits	6 ft 6in	280 lbs	None	Sword	Peter Hazel	Víctor Hugo Aguilar

== Other ==
- Distributor Cactus Game Design cross-promoted the series with an Angel Wars-themed expansion to its Redemption CCG card game in 2004, after the movie was released. The expansion featured 150 cards, which used artwork from the series for the illustrations found on the cards.
- Episode 4, "The Messengers" introduces a new class of lightning fast messenger angels.
- Episodes 4-6 are being distributed exclusively by Twentieth Century Fox and are slated for release in spring 2009.[source]
- There is a comic and graphic novel in pre-production as well.
- Angel Wars: Soul Quest was released 2001. The idea of Angel Wars was laid out but pulled into a lower age group. There was only one episode released "Soul Quest" on VHS, which had a trailer for a second episode said to be in development, and to be released in 2002. It was abandoned in favor of developing the Guardian Force series.
- The Switchfoot song "Dare You to Move" and the Newsboys song "Entertaining Angels" appear in Episode 1. Sanctus Real's "The Face of Love" appears in Episode 3. There are no songs in Episode 2.
- The first line of action figures were announced by Chris Waters in late 2006 for Easter of 2007. The line includes the Archangel Michael and the fallen angel Morgan. The 6.5" posable figures include removable helmets, wings, and swords. The collectables were managed by Near Point Toys.

== See also ==
- List of films about angels
