= Exodus (compilation album) =

Compilation album by Various
- Released: May 16, 1998
- Genre: Contemporary Christian music
- Label: Sony

Exodus is a worship album envisioned and produced by Michael W. Smith featuring Smith and various artists of Contemporary Christian Music, such as dc Talk, Jars of Clay, Third Day. The album is noted for recreations of two well-known songs: Third Day recreates Smith's "Agnus Dei" with a version still played on the radio today, and Smith recreates "I See You", a song written by Rich Mullins, and also plays the song on his second worship album, Worship Again. The album was released on May 16, 1998, and sold in excess of 400,000 copies.

== Track listing ==
Album release
No.	Title	Writer(s)	Artist	Length
1.	"Exodus"	Michael W. Smith	Michael W. Smith	5:30
2.	"My Will"	Joey Elwood, Daniel Joseph, Toby McKeehan, Michael Tait	dc Talk	5:48
3.	"Needful Hands"	Jars of Clay, Dan Haseltine	Jars of Clay	3:57
4.	"Brighten My Heart"	Matt Slocum	Sixpence None the Richer	4:37
5.	"Make Us One"	Cindy Morgan, Michael W. Smith	Cindy Morgan	3:49
6.	"Nothin'"	Chris Rice	Chris Rice	2:50
7.	"Draw Me Close"	Kelly Carpenter	The Katinas	5:07
8.	"Agnus Dei"	Michael W. Smith	Third Day	5:01
9.	"Salvation Belongs to Our God"	Adrian Howard, Pat Turner	Crystal Lewis	4:15
10.	"I See You"	Rich Mullins	Michael W. Smith	6:30
Total length:				42:?
