= Give to the Winds Thy Fears =

"Give to the Winds Thy Fears" is a traditional Christian hymn in short metre with words written by John Wesley.

== History and description ==
Its first verse is:

Give to the winds thy fears;
Home and be undismayed;
God hears thy sighs, God counts thy tears;
God shall lift up thy head.

It is one of two hymns that Wesley published in 1739 that he had translated from "Befiehl du deine Wege", a longer 1653 hymn by German hymnwriter Paul Gerhardt, the other being "Commit thou all Thy Griefs". The latter has 8 out of the original 12 verses by Gerhardt, and "Give" has 4 verses. Wesley encountered Gerhardt's hymn sung by Moravians on his travels in the United States, and compiled it into the hymnal that he compiled for the people in Georgia where he lived for a while. In his diary for 1737-05-07 he records "translated six hymns from the German while on a journey to another plantation".

In hymnals such as the U.S. Armed Forces Hymnal (1959) and The Presbyterian Hymnal (1990) it is set to the tune St Bride composed by Samuel Howard.

The Woman's Christian Temperance Union adopted the hymn as its "Crusade Hymn"; to be sung at meetings at local, state, and national levels of the organization.

== Jars of Clay ==
"God Will Lift Up Your Head"

Single by Jars of Clay

from the album Redemption Songs
- Released: 2005
- Recorded: 2005
- Genre: Rock
- Length: 4:22
- Label: Essential Records
- Songwriter(s): Dan Haseltine, Charlie Lowell, Stephen Mason, Matt Odmark
- Producer(s): Jars of Clay

Jars of Clay singles chronology
"Sunny Days" (2004)	"God Will Lift Up Your Head" (2005)	"I'll Fly Away" (2005)

Christian rock band Jars of Clay recorded the hymn, slightly altering Wesley's lyrics, as "God Will Lift Up Your Head", released on its album Redemption Songs. The song is the first of two radio singles in promotion of the album which hit number one on the Christian CHR radio charts in 2005.

=== Track listing ===
1. "God Will Lift Up Your Head" - 4:22
