= DC Talk (album) =

Studio album by DC Talk
- Released: June 13, 1989
- Recorded: 1989
- Studio: Nashville, Tennessee
- Genre: Golden age hip hop; Christian hip hop
- Length: 31:01
- Label: ForeFront
- Producer: Toby McKeehan; Ron W. Griffin

DC Talk chronology
DC Talk (1989)	Nu Thang (1990)

Professional ratings
Review scores
Source	Rating
AllMusic	3/5 stars
Cross Rhythms	8/10 stars
Jesus Freak Hideout	2/5 stars

DC Talk is the first studio album released from vocal trio DC Talk. It is the most hip hop-oriented of all of their albums as each later album gradually progressed into a more rock-centered sound. Michael Tait stated that their original goal for the album was to sell 10,000 units. It sold 7,142 units in 1989. After their popularity spiked with the release of Free at Last, back sales increased although it is the only of their studio albums to not reach RIAA gold status (500,000 units sold).

== Track listing ==
No.	Title	Length
1.	"Heavenbound"	3:53
2.	"Gah Ta Be"	3:57
3.	"Final Days"	4:08
4.	"The King (Allelujah)"	4:10
5.	"Spinnin' Round"	3:48
6.	"Voices Praise Him"	3:51
7.	"Time Ta Jam"	2:02
8.	"He Loves Me"	5:11

=== In the Free at Last tour ===
1. "Heavenbound"
2. "Time Ta Jam"
3. "He Loves Me"

== Recording ==
DC Talk (consisting of Toby McKeehan, Michael Tait, and Kevin Max) signed their initial record deal with ForeFront Records in January 1989, along with Vic Mignogna and Mike Valliere. In the long-form video Narrow Is the Road, the group points out the apartment where the deal was signed. Dropping out of Liberty University, the trio moved to Nashville, TN and recording for DC Talk immediately began. Recording was a fast process as the album released June 13, 1989.

== Singles ==
The album's opening track provided the majority of the album's relative sales success. "Heavenbound" was originally recorded for the group's independently released cassette demo, Christian Rhymes to a Rhythm, which featured only Tait and McKeehan. It was re-recorded after Kevin Max was added to the group just prior to this release. The album received a sales boost after the music video for "Heavenbound", their first music video, received a mighty airplay on the BET network's hip-hop show: "Rap City". "Heavenbound" was included on the compilation Ultimate Rap (Starsong, 1989).

The second but minor hit was "Spinnin' Round" featuring their friend and beatboxer Mike "DJ Valet Beat" Valliere who beatboxed on both "Final Days" and "Time Ta Jam". "Spinnin' Round" was included on the compilations Rappin' His Word: Today's Hottest Christian Rap (Arrival Recordings, 1990) and Rap - Straight From the Streets (Benson, 1990).

Both songs were included in the compilation album, dc talk: The Early Years. Additionally, "Gah Ta Be" was featured on Ultimate Rap 2 (Starsong, 1990).

The album Christian Rhymes to a Rhythm included "Always Leanin'" which was excluded from this album.

== Sales ==
The album released to minimum sales on June 13, 1989. The album grossed 7,142 units by the end of 1989. Christian albums are tracked on Billboard's Top Contemporary Albums chart, which then tracked the top forty albums on a bi-weekly basis (now weekly). DC Talk managed to break onto the chart just once in 1989 (No. 34 on November 18, 1989). Seven months later, in June 1990, the album returned to Top 40 on the June 2 and June 16 charts (No. 32 and No. 39, respectively). The trio's second album, Nu Thang, broke into the Top 10 in November 1990 and remained in at least the Top 12 for six straight months. It peaked at No. 5 three times during this run. The success of Nu Thang led to an interest in DC Talk far higher than it ever enjoyed on its own. After reaching the Top 40 only six times, and no higher than No. 32, in its first two and a half years, DC Talk soared to No. 18 for the chart of November 2, 1991. Proving it was no fluke, it remained on the chart for the next two and a half months. It peaked at No. 10 on November 30, 1991 but had other Top 20 showings of No. 11, No. 14 (twice), and No. 19 at various points of its run. After its rather humble beginning, DC Talk crossed the 100,000 units-sold mark.

== Reworked Live Versions ==
Two songs from DC Talk were reworked for the Free at Last World Tour in 1994. The first eight lines of lyrics from "Time ta Jam" were updated into a live-only song, which introduced by name the group's touring band members, called "Back 2 the Basics." Footage can be seen in the long-form video Narrow is the Road. Also on the Free at Last World Tour was a completely reworked version of "Heavenbound" that brought the song into the combo rap/rock sound of the Free at Last era. This version of "Heavenbound" has never been commercially released in audio or video format. An even different version of "Heavenbound" was included on The Supernatural Experience tour. It was "freestyled" by Toby McKeehan and bass player Otto Price (a.k.a. "Sugar Bear"). A clip of this version is included on the DVD/VHS The Supernatural Experience.

== Rap, Rock, & Soul ==
Following the success of Nu Thang, the group released Rap, Rock, & Soul, a long-form video that chronicled the group's first two albums. For the portion detailing DC Talk, the VHS video contains live performances of "He Loves Me" and "Time Ta Jam". The music video for "Heavenbound" is also included.

== Music videos ==
- "Heavenbound"

== Singles ==
- Heavenbound
- Spinnin' Round

== Production credits ==
- Executive Producer –Dan R. Brock
- Production –Toby McKeehan and Ron W. Griffin
- Engineering and mixing –Ron W. Griffin, Richard Hartline, E. Q. Monroe
- Recorded at Horizon Recording Studios, Pittman, NJ; OmniSound, Nashville, TN; and Crosstown Recorders, Memphis, TN
- Mastered by Hank Williams for MasterMix, Nashville TN
- Cover design –Jon Timian
- Photography –Steve Eastham and Jon Timian
- Music for "Heavenbound" arranged by Richard Hartline
- Music and vocals for "Final Days", and "He Loves Me" arranged by Vic Mignogna
- Beatbox on "Time Ta Jam", "Final Days", and "Spinnin Round" by Mike "Moose" Valliere (Valet Beat)
- Words and music by Toby McKeehan except "Voices Praise Him" and "He Loves Me" - Words by Toby McKeehan, music by Toby McKeehan and Richard Hartline
