= Solo (DC Talk album) =

EP by DC Talk
- Released: April 24, 2001
- Length: 26:50
- Label: ForeFront

DC Talk chronology
Intermission: the Greatest Hits (2000)	Solo (2001)	The Early Years (2006)

Professional ratings
Review scores
Source	Rating
Allmusic	4/5 stars
Jesus Freak Hideout	3.5/5 stars

Solo is an EP by DC Talk consisting primarily of the band members' solo efforts with the exception of a live-performance cover of U2's "40", which is the last recording made by the band before going on hiatus. "Extreme Days", was written and recorded for the film Extreme Days and a different mix was released on Momentum released later in the year.

The album won 2002 Grammy Award for Best Rock Gospel Album.

== Track listing ==
Album release
No.	Title	Writer(s)	Artist(s)	Length
1.	"40" (U2 cover) (Live)	Adam Clayton, David Evans	dc Talk	2:40
2.	"Alibi"	Michael Tait, Pete Stewart	Tait	4:12
3.	"All You Got"	Tait, Chad Chapin, Toby McKeehan	Tait	4:39
4.	"Return of the Singer"	Kevin Max, Mark Townsend	Kevin Max	3:51
5.	"Be"	Erick Cole, Max	Kevin Max	3:47
6.	"Somebody's Watching"	McKeehan, Michael-Anthony Taylor	tobyMac	3:47
7.	"Extreme Days"	McKeehan, Jamie Rowe, Taylor	tobyMac	3:50
Total length:				26:46

== Music videos ==
- Extreme Days
