= Colored People (song) =

Single by DC Talk

from the album Jesus Freak
- Released: December 22, 1996
- Recorded: 1995
- Genre: Pop rock, CCM, Christian rock, rap rock
- Length: 4:26
- Label: ForeFront/Virgin
- Songwriters: Toby McKeehan, George Cocchini
- Producers: Mark Heimermann, Toby McKeehan, John Mark Painter

DC Talk singles chronology
"Like It, Love It, Need It" (1996)	"Colored People" (1996)	"In the Light" (1996)

Audio sample
- file; help

"Colored People" is a song written and recorded by Christian rock band DC Talk. The song was one of several radio singles released from their 1995 studio album, Jesus Freak.

== Music and lyrics ==
"Colored People" is a pop rock song primarily based on acoustic guitars, a background electric guitar, and occasional strings. The verses are sung by Kevin Max, while the chorus vocals are shared by all three members with Michael Tait leading. Lyrically, the song is about appreciation of racial variety, promoting unity and a "kaleidoscopic take on race relations".

== Release and acclaim ==
The song was released as a single in 1996 and received positive comments from music critics. Entertainment Weekly editor Laura Jamison said that the album Jesus Freak "combines textured vocals, aggressive guitar, and solid songwriting, especially on 'Colored People'".

In addition to "Jesus Freak" and "Between You and Me", "Colored People" was considered instrumental in breaking DC Talk into the mainstream.

== Other releases ==
Various versions of "Colored People" have appeared on several DC Talk official releases, including the band's greatest hits album Intermission. A live version of "Colored People" was included on the 1997 live release Welcome to the Freak Show. "Colored People" also appears on the compilation album WOW 1998.

=== Cover versions ===
On the DC Talk tribute album, Freaked!, Ayiesha Woods recorded a cover of "Colored People" featuring The Gotee Brothers and John Reuben.

== Track listing ==
1. "Colored People" (radio edit)
2. "Colored People" (album version)
3. Call Out Research Hook
