= Between You and Me (DC Talk song) =

Single by DC Talk

from the album Jesus Freak
- Released: 1996
- Genre: Contemporary Christian music
- Length: 3:47 (radio edit)
- Label: ForeFront; Virgin
- Songwriters: Toby McKeehan; Mark Heimermann

DC Talk singles chronology
"Jesus Freak" (1995)	"Between You and Me" (1996)	"What If I Stumble?" (1996)

Music video
- "Between You and Me" by DC Talk on YouTube

"Between You and Me" (Note: Some official releases, such as the single cover, label the song "Just Between You and Me".) is a song by the American contemporary Christian music group DC Talk. Released in 1996, it was the second radio and commercial single released from the group's fourth album, Jesus Freak. After the unexpected success of the grunge rock single "Jesus Freak", "Between You and Me" helped to bring DC Talk to a new level of success and solidify them as mainstream artists. The song later earned DC Talk a GMA Dove Award and is the only DC Talk single to have charted on the Billboard Hot 100. The single was also a Christian radio success and peaked at No. 1 on both the Christian adult contemporary and Christian Contemporary Hit Radio CCM Magazine charts.

== Meaning and composition ==
"Between You and Me"
A 30 second sample from DC Talk's "Between You and Me"

Lyrically, the song stresses the importance of forgiveness. In addition, the bridge of the song addresses the need for confessing one's sins to God. DC Talk member Toby McKeehan, co-writer of the song, said that the lyrics simply describe the way relationships work. McKeehan later elaborated in an interview that the song came from his relationship with fellow band members Michael Tait and Kevin Max.

In contrast to many of the DC Talk's other singles, the Christian message – the importance of forgiveness and confession – is heavily implied, although it is not blatantly stated in terms of any specific religion. The only mention of God is featured during the breakdown of the song, which is absent in the radio edit. This removal of God from the song caused some fans of the band to wonder if the group's record label made a "conscious effort to remove any overt Christian content from the song."

The song is built around acoustic strumming and synthesized drums, courtesy of Scott Williamson. The song begins with acoustic strumming in the key of G major. The song then moves into the key of E major during the verses. It features a chorus that is in the key of G major; in addition, the chorus is composed of "boyish lead vocals", "sweet harmonies", and "whirling organs". During the verses, Michael Tait, Kevin Max, and Toby McKeehan take turns singing lead. The second chorus is followed by a melodic breakdown featuring minimalistic guitar and whispered vocals. The song then repeats the line "It's my way to freedom" and "I've got something to say" until the end.

== Music video ==
The music video for the song features Michael Tait, Kevin Max, and Toby McKeehan performing the song in a laundromat. Interspersed is footage of a man carrying a package while running from two other men. Near the end, he runs into the laundromat where DC Talk are singing and deposits the box in a trash can before leaving. Tait, Max, and McKeehan then reach into the trash can to investigate the contents of the box. Just as the box is opened, the video ends.

The song's video received regular airtime on MTV and VH1. While the video was popular, however, the band found it more and more difficult to get airplay on MTV for what they perceived as a bias against the Christian music scene. McKeehan explained that with "Between You and Me", the group was able to "sneak one past the goalie", but afterwards the DJs realized that "this group's from the Christian market".

== Release and reception ==
Professional ratings
Review scores
Source	Rating
AllMusic	2.5/5 stars
Billboard	(Positive)

The song was released as the second single for Jesus Freak in 1996. Due to its wide appeal, however, the song was extensively played on many non-Christian stations, leading the single to become a major crossover hit. The song's surprising rise on the Billboard's charts was a result of the partnership with Virgin Records. Phil Quartararo, then-CEO of Virgin Records said the song was "identified early in the game as a very radio-friendly cut." In addition to "Jesus Freak" and "Colored People", this song was considered instrumental in breaking DC Talk into the mainstream.

Commercially, the song was a top 40 hit. The song remains DC Talk's highest-charting single on mainstream radio, peaking at No. 29 on the Billboard Hot 100 single chart. The single was also a Christian radio success. It peaked at No. 1 on both the Christian Adult Contemporary and Christian Contemporary Hit Radio CCM Magazine charts. The fact that the band was able to achieve success impressed many fans and individuals in the music industry. Jay R. Howard and John M. Streck, in their book Apostles of Rock: The Splintered World of Contemporary Christian Music, called it "a significant validation of the music".

Critically, the song was also a success. Billboard magazine gave the single an extremely positive review and noted that the song and band were helping to shatter the myth that "Christian pop has to be heavy-handed or steeping power-ballad syrup". The magazine also praised the song for "lyrics [that] remain subtle but forthright in the song's positive message". Michael Mehle of the Rocky Mountain News positively noted that the song possessed "Seal-like R&B" qualities. AllMusic awarded the single two-and-a-half stars out of five. The song was successful when it came to the GMA Dove Awards. In 1997, the song won an award for the best Pop/Contemporary Recorded Song of the Year.

== Other releases ==
A live version is not included on the 1997 live release Welcome to the Freak Show as it was not played until the last dates of the tour, after the recording had already taken place. The music video, however, was included on the DVD release of the album. "Between You and Me" also appears on the compilation album WOW 1997 and was covered by both Relient K and the team-up of Paul Wright and Ayiesha Woods for the tribute album Freaked!

== Track listing ==
US commercial single

1. "Between You and Me" (radio edit) – 3:47
2. "So Help Me God" – 4:39

European commercial single

1. "Between You and Me" (radio edit) – 3:47
2. "So Help Me God" – 4:39
3. "The Hardway" – 5:18
4. "Between You and Me" (album version) – 4:59

== Chart positions ==
=== Weekly charts ===
Chart (1996)	Peak position
Canada (RPM)	6
Germany (GfK)	91
New Zealand (Recorded Music NZ)	50
US Billboard Hot 100	29
US Hot Adult Top 40 Tracks (Billboard)	11
US Adult Contemporary (Billboard)	24
US Christian AC (The CCM Update)	1
US Christian CHR (The CCM Update)	1

=== Year-end charts ===
Chart (1997)	Position
Canada Top Singles (RPM)	54

== Album credits ==
Personnel

- Toby McKeehan – vocals
- Michael Tait – vocals
- Kevin Max Smith – vocals
- Dann Huff – guitar
- Otto Price – bass guitar
- Scott Williamson – hat and fills
- Todd Collins – Conga, Cabasa
- Mark Heimermann – double bass, Hammond B-3

Production

- Toby McKeehan – producer
- Mark Heimermann – programming, producer
- Todd Collins – programming
