= Nu Thang =

Studio album by DC Talk
- Released: September 1990
- Studios: Duckworth Studio, Hummingbird Studios, OmniSound Studios and Quad Studios (Nashville, Tennessee); North Beach Studio (Franklin, Tennessee); Crosstown Recorders (Memphis, Tennessee)
- Genres: Golden age hip hop; Christian hip hop; Christian R&B
- Length: 43:50
- Label: ForeFront
- Producers: Mark Heimermann; Toby McKeehan

DC Talk chronology
DC Talk (1989)	Nu Thang (1990)	Free at Last (1992)

Professional ratings
Review scores
Source	Rating
AllMusic	3/5 stars
Cross Rhythms	10/10 stars
Jesus Freak Hideout	3/5 stars
CCM Magazine	No score

Nu Thang is the second studio album from DC Talk, which was released in 1990. It was certified Gold by RIAA. Almost two decades later, the single "Nu Thang" and its YouTube video gained more recognition after a viral video was put up known as "The Nu Thang Kid". It is a video of a boy from the 1990s rapping "Nu Thang", and the video was used on an episode of Equals Three.

== Track listing ==
1. "When DC Talks" (Toby McKeehan, Mark Heimmerman) – 2:28
2. "He Works" (Toby McKeehan, Joe Hogue, Jeff Silvey) – 3:39
3. "I Luv Rap Music" (Jackie Gore) – 3:49
4. "No More" (Toby McKeehan) – 3:37
5. "Nu Thang" (Toby McKeehan, Joel Dobbins) – 4:12
6. "Things of This World" (Toby McKeehan) – 5:11
7. "Walls" (Toby McKeehan, Michael Tait) – 4:10
8. "Talk It Out" (Toby McKeehan) – 3:59
9. "Take It to the Lord" (Toby McKeehan) – 4:20
10. "Children Can Live (Without It)" (Toby McKeehan) – 3:56
11. "Can I Get a Witness" (Toby McKeehan, Jeff Silvey) – 4:25

== Singles ==
- "I Luv Rap Music"
- "Can I Get A Witness"

== Music videos ==
- "I Luv Rap Music"
- "Nu Thang"
- "Walls"

== Personnel ==
DC Talk

- Toby McKeehan – rap, backing vocals, drum programming, samples, scratches
- Kevin Max Smith – vocals, backing vocals, keyboards
- Michael Tait – vocals, backing vocals

Musicians

- Mark Heimermann – keyboards, backing vocals
- Tony Thomas – keyboards
- Jerry McPherson – guitars
- Greg Redding – guitars
- Chris Rodriguez – guitars, backing vocals
- Steve Taylor – guitars
- Jackie Street – bass
- Joel Dobbins – drum programming
- Joe Hogue – drum programming, backing vocals
- Tom Lonardo – drum programming
- Gary Lunn – drum programming
- Todd Collins – samples, scratches, backing vocals
- True M.C. – samples, scratches
- Vicki Hampton – backing vocals
- Chris Harris – backing vocals
- Chris Hogue – backing vocals
- Lisa Rodriguez – backing vocals

Production

- Dan Brock – executive producer
- Ron W. Griffin – executive producer
- Chris Harris – executive producer
- Mark Heimermann – producer
- Toby McKeehan – producer
- Joe Baldridge – engineer
- Lynn Fuston – engineer
- Rusty McFarland – engineer
- Greg Morrow – engineer
- Bret Teegarden – mixing
- Randy Garmon – assistant engineer
- Ray Gaston – assistant engineer
- Ken Love – mastering at MasterMix (Nashville, Tennessee)
- Buddy Jackson – art direction
- Beth Middleworth – design
- Mark Tucker – photography
- Brock & Associates – management
