= Jesus Freak (album) =

Studio album by DC Talk
- Released: November 21, 1995
- Studios: Fun Attic Studio, Franklin, Tennessee; House of Insomnia Franklin, Tennessee; Sanctuary Sound Studio, Nashville, Tennessee; Secret Sound, Nashville, Tennessee
- Genres: Christian rock; Christian hip-hop; CCM; rap rock; alternative rock
- Length: 57:53
- Labels: ForeFront; Virgin
- Producers: Mark Heimermann; Toby McKeehan; John Mark Painter

DC Talk chronology
Free at Last (1992)	Jesus Freak (1995)	Welcome to the Freak Show (1997)

Jesus Freak is the fourth studio album by the American Christian rap and rock trio DC Talk, released on November 21, 1995, on ForeFront Records. The style was a marked departure from the group's previous releases, incorporating a heavier rock sound and elements of grunge that was popular at the time.

The album was released to both critical and commercial success. It peaked at number 16 on the Billboard 200 and six of the album's seven singles reached number one across various Christian radio formats. It won the 1997 Grammy Award for Best Rock Gospel Album.

Jesus Freak is widely considered to be one of the greatest and most influential albums in the history of contemporary Christian music (CCM).

== Background ==
After three albums of hip-hop-oriented sound, including DC Talk's Grammy award-winning third album, Free at Last, which was based primarily on hip-hop and pop-oriented songwriting, the trio decided to innovate and reinvent their style.

After three years, DC Talk returned with songs featuring a more alternative rock sound. Thus, fans and critics considered the album's lead single, "Jesus Freak", unexpected.

Michael Tait said, "I was totally into rock and roll at the time [...] I really wanted to make a rock record." The band focused on more rock-oriented music, with touches of rap and pop interwoven into the mix. Tait later explained, "We wanted to write songs that would hopefully touch a generation."

== Recording and production ==
Compared to DC Talk's other albums, Jesus Freak was, stylistically, an experiment. The album was a fusion of various musical genres, including pop, rock, and grunge, all combined with hip-hop.

The title track, "Jesus Freak," is also of historical importance. It is believed to be the first link between grunge and rapcore in CCM. The song was even played on some secular stations.

In addition, the album contains two cover songs: "Day by Day," from the musical Godspell, and a heavily overhauled version of "In the Light" originally by Charlie Peacock. Two spoken-word samples are also heard; "Mind's Eye" features the words of Billy Graham and "What If I Stumble" contains a quote from Brennan Manning.

== Lyrical themes ==
As with the genres, the themes of Jesus Freak are varied, ranging from the spiritual–such as accepting Jesus, hypocrisy, atheism–to the social, such as seeking forgiveness from a friend, racism, facing intolerance, and acceptance.

== Release ==
Jesus Freak was released on November 21, 1995. It debuted at number 16 on the Billboard 200, selling over 85,800 copies in its first week of release. This number was the highest debut for a Christian album at the time.

After the album, released through ForeFront Records, proved to be extremely successful, the band signed an exclusive distribution deal with Virgin Records. The label made it a priority to promote the album to mainstream music fans. Due to this promotional increase, "Between You and Me" became a hit for the band, managing to chart on the Billboard Hot 100.

== Reception ==
Professional ratings
Review scores
Source	Rating
AllMusic	3/5 stars
Cross Rhythms	10/10 stars
Entertainment Weekly	B+ (1995); B (1996)
Jesus Freak Hideout	5/5 stars
Pitchfork	6.7/10

After the initial success of its release, Jesus Freak was RIAA-certified as Gold by its first month, for shipments exceeding 500,000 units. The album has gone on to sell over two million copies in the United States, achieving double platinum certification by the RIAA. Critical response to Jesus Freak was generally positive, and many of the album's singles were met with positive reception. For instance, "Jesus Freak" was the first non-AC song to win the Dove Award for Song of the Year. The album also spawned several hit singles. Six of the album's singles became number-one hits across various Christian radio formats. "Between You and Me" was even a cross-over hit on secular radio, peaking at number 29 on the Billboard Hot 100.

== Legacy ==
The album is considered one of the greatest and most influential Christian albums of all time and is viewed as a landmark of the 1990s christian music scene.

It is one of the biggest-selling Christian albums of all time and has been certified double platinum in the United States and gold in Canada.

On June 20, 2006, Gotee Records released a ten-year anniversary tribute, Freaked!, featuring artists from record labels Gotee and Mono vs Stereo covering songs from the original album. "In the Light" and "Jesus Freak" are both featured in Alive and Transported. In addition, the songs are still regularly sung in tobyMac and Newsboys concerts.

In 2006, EMI released a commemorative 10th-anniversary version of the album, Jesus Freak: 10th Anniversary Special Edition. This special edition contained a bonus disc of brand-new remixes, rarities, live tracks, and demos. A single-disc remaster was released in 2013.

For the 20th anniversary of the album in November 2015, SMLXLVinyl.com released a double lp 180-gram vinyl of the album. It was its first pressing on the format.

== Track listing ==
No.	Title	Writer(s)	Length
1.	"So Help Me God"	Toby McKeehan; Michael Tait; Kevin Smith; Mark Heimermann; Dann Huff	4:39
2.	"Colored People"	McKeehan; George Cocchini	4:26
3.	"Jesus Freak"	McKeehan; Heimermann	4:50
4.	"What If I Stumble?"	McKeehan; Daniel Joseph	5:06
5.	"Day by Day"	Stephen Schwartz; McKeehan; Smith	4:30
6.	"Mrs. Morgan"		0:57
7.	"Between You and Me"	McKeehan; Heimermann	4:59
8.	"Like It, Love It, Need It"	McKeehan; Smith; Heimermann; David Soldi; Jason Barrett	5:23
9.	"Jesus Freak (Reprise)"		1:17
10.	"In the Light" (Charlie Peacock cover)	Charlie Peacock; McKeehan	5:06
11.	"What Have We Become?"	McKeehan; Smith; Heimermann	6:09
12.	"Mind's Eye"	McKeehan; Tait; Heimermann	5:17
13.	"Alas, My Love" (hidden track)	Smith	5:18
Total length:			57:53

10th anniversary special edition bonus disc
No.	Title	Writer(s)	Length
14.	"So Help Me God" (Savadocious Junk Yard mix 1974)	McKeehan; Tait; Smith; Heimermann; Duff	4:13
15.	"Jesus Freak" (Savage Perspective mix)	McKeehan; Heimermann	4:42
16.	"What If I Stumble" (DoubleDutch remix)	McKeehan; Joseph	4:19
17.	"Between You and Me" (Fab remix)	McKeehan; Heimermann	4:58
18.	"Like It, Love It, Need It" (dDubb remix)	McKeehan; Smith; Heimermann; Soldi; Barrett	4:18
19.	"What Have We Become?" (dDubb remix)	McKeehan; Smith; Heimermann	4:14
20.	"Mind's Eye" (1995 A Swing and a Miss mix featuring Mark Heimermann/unreleased demo version)	McKeehan; Tait; Heimermann	5:06
21.	"Jesus Freak" (1995 Gotee Bros. Freaked Out remix)	McKeehan; Heimermann	4:40
22.	"Help!" (The Beatles cover; live)	Lennon–McCartney	0:59
23.	"Colored People" (live)	McKeehan; Cocchoni	4:45
24.	"It's the End of the World (As We Know It)" (R.E.M. cover; live)	Bill Berry; Peter Buck; Mike Mills; Michael Stipe	2:12
25.	"I Wish We'd All Been Ready" (live)	Larry Norman	3:37
26.	"40" (U2 cover; live)	U2	2:37
27.	"In the Light" (instrumental)	Peacock	5:21

== Chart positions ==
Chart (1995)	Peak position
U.S. Billboard 200	16
U.S. Top Christian Albums	1

Year	Single	Chart	Peak position
1995	"Jesus Freak"	CCM Christian CHR	23
1995	"Jesus Freak"	CCM Christian Rock	1
1995	"Jesus Freak"	U.S. Bubbling Under Hot 100	10
1995	"Mind's Eye"	CCM Christian CHR	1
1995	Just Between You and Me"	CCM Christian CHR	1
1995	Just Between You and Me"	CCM Christian Adult Contemporary	1
1995	Just Between You and Me"	U.S. Billboard Hot 100	29
1995	Just Between You and Me"	U.S. Billboard Top 40	15
1995	Just Between You and Me"	U.S. Billboard Adult Contemporary	24
1995	Just Between You and Me"	U.S. Billboard Adult Top 40 Tracks	11
1996	"Like It, Love It, Need It"	CCM Christian Rock	1
1996	"In the Light"	CCM Christian CHR	1
1996	"In the Light"	CCM Christian Adult Contemporary	3
1996	"What If I Stumble?"	CCM Christian CHR	1
1996	"What If I Stumble?"	CCM Christian Adult Contemporary	3
1997	"So Help Me God"	CCM Christian Rock	3
1997	"Colored People"	CCM Christian CHR	1
1997	"Colored People"	CCM Christian Adult Contemporary	3
1997	"Day by Day"	CCM Christian Rock	3
1997	"What Have We Become?"	CCM Christian CHR	1
1997	"What Have We Become?"	CCM Christian Adult Contemporary	32

== Personnel ==
DC Talk

- TobyMac – raps, lead and backing vocals
- Kevin Max – lead and backing vocals, poem (13)
- Michael Tait – lead and backing vocals, additional BGV arrangements (1, 4, 7, 8, 10, 12)

Musicians

- Mark Heimermann – programming (1–3, 5, 7, 11, 13), Hammond B3 organ (1, 3, 5, 7, 11, 12), upright bass (3), additional vocal arrangements (4), Wurlitzer electric piano (5), pads (7, 12), Moog synthesizer (8), finger cymbals (8), acoustic piano (10), broom (12), keyboards (13)
- Dann Huff – programming (1), guitars (1, 3, 5, 7, 13)
- George Cocchini – guitars (2, 13)
- Chris Rodriguez – guitars (2, 4, 10)
- Oran Thornton – guitars (3, 5, 8)
- Sean Turner – guitars (3)
- Jerry McPherson – mandolin (4), guitars (11, 12)
- Brent Barcus – guitars (5), bridge arrangements (10)
- Dave Perkins – guitars (11)
- Jackie Street – bass (1, 2, 12)
- Otto Price – bass (2, 5, 7, 10), bridge arrangements (10), wah bass (11)
- John Mark Painter – bass (3, 4, 11), accordion (4), guitars (4)
- Brent Milligan – bass (8)
- Jimmie Lee Sloas – bass (13)
- Scott Williamson – drums (1, 11), drum fills (7), hi-hat (7)
- Aaron Smith – drums (2, 10)
- David Huff – drums (3, 5, 12)
- Shaun McWilliams – drums (4)
- Will Denton – drums (8), bridge arrangements (10)
- Todd Collins – bongos (1, 12), loops (1, 12), programming (3, 5, 7, 11, 12), drums (3), cowbell (3), percussion (4), congas (5, 7), tambourine (5), cabasa (7), vocals (9), brush snare (11), Akai MPC60 (13)
- Terry McMillan – percussion (2, 10, 13)
- Greg Herrington – loops (10)
- Denis Solee – flute (11)
- Ronn Huff – string arrangements and conductor (2, 10)
- Jason Halbert – bridge arrangements (10)
- Brennan Manning – ragamuffin intro (4)
- Charlie Peacock – guest vocals (10)
- Billy Graham – spoken word (12)

== Production ==
- Dan R.Brock – executive producer
- Eddie DeGarmo – executive producer
- Toby McKeehan – producer, collage photos
- Mark Heimermann – producer (1–3, 5–13)
- John Mark Painter – producer (4)
- Joe Baldridge – engineer, mixing, collage photos
- Lynn Fuston – string recording
- Russ Long – additional engineer
- Todd Robbins – additional engineer
- Dave Dillbeck – assistant engineer
- Dan Fritzsell – assistant engineer (1–3, 5–13)
- Patrick Murphy – assistant engineer (1–3, 5–13)
- Ed Sharpe – assistant engineer (1–3, 5–13)
- Penn Singleton – assistant engineer (1–3, 5–13)
- Shane D. Wilson – assistant engineer (1–3, 5–13)
- Chuck Linder – mix assistant
- Ronnie Thomas – editing at MasterMix (Nashville, Tennessee)
- Ken Love – mastering at MasterMix (Nashville, Tennessee)
- Nate Yetton – A&R
- Kevin Max Smith – art direction
- Paul Venaas – design, layout
- John Falls – individual band photos
- Norman Jean Roy – back cover photography

== Music videos ==
- Colored People
- Jesus Freak
- Day by Day
- Between You and Me
