= Free at Last (DC Talk album) =

Studio album by DC Talk
- Released: November 18, 1992
- Recorded: 1991–1992
- Studios: Deer Valley Studio, The Bennett House, The Castle and Studio At Mole End (Franklin, Tennessee); Emerald Sound Studios, Midtown Studios, Nightingale Studio, OmniSound Studios, Recording Arts, Sound Revolutions, Skylab Recording Studios, Quad Studios and Syncrosound (Nashville, Tennessee); Southern Living Studios (Atlanta, Georgia)
- Genres: Golden age hip hop; Christian rock; Christian hip hop
- Length: 54:07
- Label: ForeFront
- Producers: Mark Heimermann; Joe Hogue; Toby McKeehan

DC Talk chronology
Nu Thang (1990)	Free at Last (1992)	Jesus Freak (1995)

Professional ratings
Review scores
Source	Rating
AllMusic	4.5/5 stars
Cross Rhythms	10/10 stars
Jesus Freak Hideout	5/5 stars

Free at Last is the third studio album from DC Talk, which was released in 1992. Music videos were filmed for "Jesus Is Just Alright", "The Hardway" and "Luv Is A Verb". In 1994, DC Talk released a long-form video of the "Free at Last World Tour" entitled Narrow is the Road, in which all three music videos can be seen.

The album was listed at No. 9 in the 2001 book, CCM Presents: The 100 Greatest Albums in Christian Music and received the Grammy Award for Best Rock Gospel Album (including Best Rock/Contemporary Gospel Album) in 1993. The songs "Socially Acceptable" and "Jesus Is Just Alright" received Dove Awards at the 24th GMA Dove Awards for Rap/Hip Hop Recorded Song of the Year and Rock Recorded Song of the Year respectively. "Luv Is a Verb" received a Dove Award for Rap/Hip Hop Recorded Song of the Year at the 25th GMA Dove Awards.

A special commemorative reissue of this album, including rare tracks and a DVD, was released upon its 10th anniversary.

== Track listing ==
No.	Title	Writer(s)	Length
1.	"Luv Is a Verb"	Toby McKeehan, Mark Heimermann, George Cocchini	4:15
2.	"That Kinda Girl"	Toby McKeehan	4:12
3.	"Greer"		0:21
4.	"Jesus Is Just Alright (The Doobie Brothers cover)"	Arthur Reid Reynolds	4:37
5.	"Say the Words"	Toby McKeehan, Mark Heimermann	5:00
6.	"WDCT"		0:43
7.	"Socially Acceptable"	Toby McKeehan, Mark Heimermann	4:57
8.	"Free at Last"	Toby McKeehan, Joe Hogue	4:55
9.	"Time Is... (featuring Michael Sweet)"	Toby McKeehan, Mark Heimermann, George Cocchini	4:10
10.	"The Hardway"	Toby McKeehan	5:19
11.	"2 Honks & a Negro"		0:18
12.	"Lean on Me"	Bill Withers	5:00
13.	"Testimony"		0:44
14.	"I Don't Want It"	Kevin Max Smith, Toby McKeehan	4:14
15.	"Will Power"		0:15
16.	"Word 2 the Father"	Toby McKeehan	4:02
17.	"Jesus Is Just Alright (Reprise)"		1:00
Total length:			54:07

- (10th Anniversary Edition features "The Hardway - Revisited" and look back tracks)

== Music videos ==
- "Jesus Is Just Alright"
- "The Hardway"
- "Luv Is a Verb"

== Singles ==
- "Jesus Is Just Alright"
- "Socially Acceptable"
- "Luv is a Verb"
- "The Hardway"
- "Say the Words (Now) - (Remix)"

== Legacy ==
The album is looked at as a turning point in the history of Christian music and has been named one of the greatest albums in the genre. It has been rereleased twice with a tenth anniversary edition in 2002 and a single disc remaster in 2013.

== Credits ==
DC Talk

- Michael Tait – lead vocals, backing vocals (1, 2, 4, 7–9, 12, 14, 16)
- Kevin Max – lead vocals, additional backing vocals (1, 7), backing vocals (2, 4, 8, 9, 12, 14)
- TobyMac – rapping (1, 2, 4, 5, 7–10, 12, 14, 16), lead vocals (10), drum programming (1, 2, 4, 5, 7–10, 12, 14, 16), keyboards (2, 8, 12), bass programming (2, 8, 12), additional programming (2), sampler (4), backing vocals (2, 8, 12, 14, 16)

Musicians

- Mark Heimermann – keyboards (1, 5, 7, 9, 16), drum programming (1, 5, 9), additional backing vocals (1, 5, 7), additional keyboards (4, 10, 14), backing vocals (10, 14)
- Todd Collins – additional programming (1, 5, 7, 9, 10, 14, 16), rapping (1, 4, 5, 7–10, 12, 16), backing vocals (8, 10, 14, 16)
- Phil Madeira – Hammond B3 organ (1, 4, 8), guitars (4), live drums (4)
- Joe Hogue – keyboards (2, 4, 7, 8, 12), bass programming (2, 8, 12), drum programming (2, 4, 7, 8, 12), backing vocals (2, 4, 8, 12), congregation vocals (8)
- Tony Miracle – keyboards (10, 14, 16), drum programming (10, 14)
- Michael Brooks Linney – keyboards (16), drum programming (16)
- Danny Duncan – additional programming (16)
- George Cocchini – guitars (1, 5, 8, 9, 14, 16)
- Micah Wilshire – guitars (2, 12), backing vocals (2), congregation vocals (8)
- Dann Huff – guitars (4, 7, 9)
- Jerry McPherson – guitars (10, 12)
- Jackie Street – bass (1, 5, 9, 14, 16), additional bass (8)
- Wade Jaynes – bass (4)
- John Mark Painter – wah bass (7), string arrangements (7), muted trumpet (10)
- Mark Douthit – saxophones (1)
- Chris McDonald – trombone (1)
- Mike Haynes – trumpet (1)
- George Tidwell – trumpet (1)
- Kristin Wilkinson – strings (7)
- Teron Carter – rapping (1, 7)
- Stacy Jones – rapping (1, 7)
- Majik – DJ (4, 8)
- Billy Gaines – backing vocals (1, 7, 16)
- Chris Rodriguez – backing vocals (1, 7)
- Chris Willis – backing vocals (1, 2, 7)
- Angelo Petrucci – backing vocals (8)
- Veronica Petrucci – backing vocals (8), guest vocalist (8)
- Michael Sweet – backing vocals (9)
- P.J. Heimermann – backing vocals (10)
- Ken "Scat" Springs – backing vocals (16)
- Raymond Boyd – congregation vocals (8)
- Shirley Durrance – congregation vocals (8)
- Cher Hogue – congregation vocals (8)
- Nyana Parker – congregation vocals (8)
- Michael Quinlan – congregation vocals (8)
- Chris Harris – preacher (8), backing vocals (10)
- Oliver Wells – choir director (8)
- Cindy Butts – choir (8)
- Mary Chapman – choir (8)
- Mancilla Elder – choir (8)
- Mark Elem – choir (8)
- Monica Flair – choir (8)
- Juanita Flemster – choir (8)
- Roberta Higgs – choir (8)
- John Madgett – choir (8)
- Sheila Price – choir (8)
- Dexter M. Redding – choir (8)
- Kimberly Thompson – choir (8)
- Carmen Williams – choir (8)
- Michael Wright – choir (8)

Production

- Dan R. Brock – executive producer
- Eddie DeGarmo – executive producer
- TobyMac – producer (1–17), art direction
- Mark Heimermann – producer (1, 3–7, 9, 10, 11, 13–17)
- Joe Hogue – producer (2, 8, 12)
- Michael Quinlan – assistant producer (2, 8, 12)
- Joe Baldridge – engineer
- Paul Salveson – engineer
- Stephen Stewart-Short – mixing
- Steve Bishir – additional engineer
- Ronnie Brookshire – additional engineer
- Keith Compton – additional engineer
- Lynn Fuston – additional engineer
- Bryan Lenox – additional engineer
- Penn Singleton – additional engineer
- Jeff Coppage – assistant engineer
- Bryan Harden – assistant engineer
- Clark Hook – assistant engineer, mix assistant
- Patrick Kelly – assistant engineer
- Greg Parker – assistant engineer
- Shane D. Wilson – assistant engineer
- Martin Woodlee – assistant engineer, mix assistant
- Amy Hughes – mix assistant
- John Hurley – mix assistant
- Ken Love – mastering at MasteMix (Nashville, Tennessee)
- Beth Finch – art coordination
- Lisa Stutts – art coordination
- Michael McGaffin – design, layout
- Judy Northcutt – design, layout
- John Falls – photography
- Russ Harrington – photograph
- Norman Roy – photography
- True Artist Management – management
