= DC Talk =

American Christian rap band

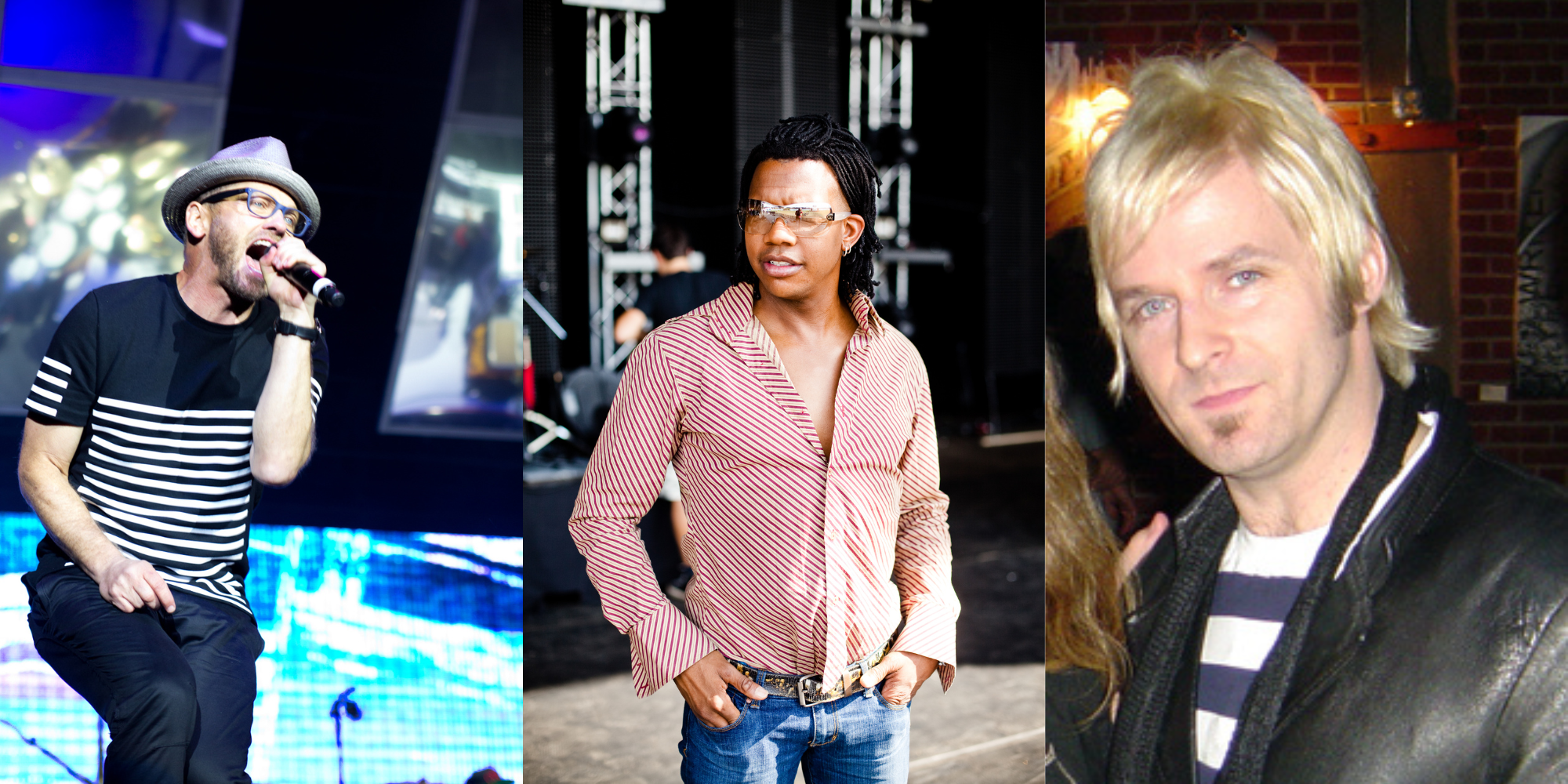
- DC Talk members left to right: Toby McKeehan, Michael Tait, Kevin Max Smith

Background information
- Origin: Liberty University, Lynchburg, Virginia, U.S.
- Genres: Christian hip-hop; Christian rock; rap rock; pop rock; alternative rock; Christian R&B
- Years active: 1987–2002; 2015; 2017–2019; 2022
- Labels: ForeFront; Virgin; Capitol CMG; Sparrow
- Past members: Toby McKeehan; Michael Tait; Kevin Max
- Website: dctalk.com

DC Talk (stylized as dc Talk) was an American Christian rap and rock trio. The group was formed at Liberty University in Lynchburg, Virginia in 1987 by Toby McKeehan, Michael Tait, and Kevin Max Smith. They released five major studio albums together: dc Talk (1989), Nu Thang (1990), Free at Last (1992), Jesus Freak (1995), and Supernatural (1998). In 2002, the Encyclopedia of Contemporary Christian Music called dc Talk "the most popular overtly Christian act of all time."

In 2001, the group released an EP, Solo, which contained two solo songs from each member. Since that time, the three band members all have led solo careers and two have joined other groups, though they never formally disbanded. They performed and recorded individual songs together several times during the 2000s and 2010s, and in 2017, and in 2019 the band reunited for a cruise.

The group's musical style evolved significantly throughout its career. Its first two releases, DC Talk and Nu Thang, were predominantly hip-hop. Their third album, Free at Last, also mainly took influence from hip-hop while the group's music began to incorporate rock and other influences. The trio's last two albums, Jesus Freak and Supernatural, were predominantly pop rock.

In June 2025, following allegations of sexual assault made against Michael Tait, many radio stations removed from rotation DC Talk and Newsboys (with whom Tait was the lead singer from 2009 to 2025).

== History ==
=== Formation ===
While attending Liberty University, Toby McKeehan met Michael Tait, and the two began to perform together. Tait had previously been featured on Jerry Falwell's The Old Time Gospel Hour and with the Falwell Singers. He also performed solo, what McKeehan later described as a "kind of an R&B/church-oriented music".

The two joined forces to record a song that McKeehan had written, "Heavenbound". They performed the song before an audience of 8,000 Liberty University students with McKeehan rapping and Tait singing the chorus. The song was well received, selling out the approximately 3,000 copies of their demo tape, Christian Rhymes to a Rhythm. The tape included "Heavenbound" and was distributed by the group in the Washington, D.C. area.

Kevin Max Smith came from a campus rock band to join the group. Max was approached by Tait after performing The Imperials's "Lord of the Harvest" during a chapel session. The two became friends and Max was introduced to McKeehan. All three moved off campus to live together.

In 1988, the group independently released their self-titled album, a cassette-only release. This album would be re-released by ForeFront Records the following year.

The success of the group's demo tape eventually led to a recording contract with ForeFront Records in January 1989. Shortly after signing the recording contract the trio moved to Nashville, Tennessee, and called themselves "DC Talk and the One Way Crew". The name was later simplified to "DC Talk", which came to stand for "decent Christian talk", though originally "DC" was taken from Washington, D.C., where Toby McKeehan had formerly been rapping.

=== DC Talk (1989) ===
After signing the recording contract with ForeFront, the trio released their self-titled debut album, DC Talk, in 1989 with Mike Valliere and Vic Mignogna. The music video for their first single, "Heavenbound", received airplay on the BET network.

=== Nu Thang (1990–1992) ===
Their follow-up full-length release, Nu Thang, and a Christmas three-song EP titled Yo! Ho! Ho!, were both released in 1990. Nu Thang had two successful singles: "I Luv Rap Music" and "Can I Get a Witness". Apart from dealing with strictly Christian themes, the band incorporated songs addressing social issues, such as racism in the song "Walls" and abortion in "Children Can Live Without It". The hip-hop/pop styling of the album earned the band attention, expanding the group's audience, and by 1991, Nu Thang had sold 200,000 copies. The band became an opening act for Michael W. Smith and received a Dove Award. The release of their Rap, Rock, n' Soul video garnered a wider audience for the group, being certified gold for long form video.

In 1992, a year after its release, Nu Thang sold more than 300,000 copies and gave the trio two more Dove Awards. In addition to the increasing attention that the group began to receive, DC Talk appeared on The Arsenio Hall Show that same year. "Nu Thang" was eventually certified gold, selling over 500,000 copies, an impressive feat for a Christian artist at that time.

=== Free at Last (1992–1994) ===
In November 1992, the group released their third album, Free at Last, which was eventually certified platinum by the RIAA in 1995. In 2001, CCM ranked "Free at Last" as the ninth best album in Christian music. The album included a cover version of the Bill Withers song "Lean on Me" and a remake of "Jesus Is Just Alright", originally recorded by the Art Reynolds Singers. Free at Last stayed at the No. 1 spot on the Billboard CCM sales chart for 34 weeks and was the band's first album to top the Christian Albums chart. DC Talk became one of the first contemporary Christian groups to perform on late-night television when, on November 12, 1993, the band performed "Jesus Is Just Alright" on The Tonight Show with Jay Leno. Free at Last also garnered the group's first Grammy Award for Best Rock Gospel Album in 1994. The success of the album is attributed to the group moving away from a rap sound to a blend of hip-hop and pop. The album also prompted the filming of a documentary film with the same name. In 1994, the band released a Christmas single, "We Three Kings", on the album "Joyful Christmas".

==== Free at Last: The Movie ====
During the Free at Last tour, the band was followed around by camera crews to film a documentary. The documentary was planned to be released as a theatrical film, Free at Last: The Movie, and was heavily promoted on Lightmusic TV, a Christian music video show. After months of teaser trailers, they abruptly stopped, because the movie could not find a distributor. Eight years after the film was to be released theatrically, the movie was finally released on DVD in unfinished form. Some of the footage used for the movie was shown in the music video for "The Hardway".

=== Jesus Freak (1995–1997) ===
Jesus Freak was released in 1995, and it achieved the highest first-week sales of any Christian release at the time, reaching No. 16 on the Billboard 200. The album, which was ultimately certified double platinum, was certified gold within 30 days of its release. This album was a fusion of musical stylings, with a more pop-rock oriented sound combined with hip-hop.

Jesus Freak marked a milestone in the group's commercial career, as they signed a deal with Virgin Records in 1996 to distribute their music to the mainstream market. It also earned DC Talk their second Grammy.

The title track is also of historical importance. It is believed to be the first link between grunge and rapcore in Contemporary Christian music, and was the first non–Adult Contemporary song to win the Dove Award for Song of the Year. The song was also played on some secular stations. "Between You and Me" was a successful single, reaching No. 24 and No. 29 respectively on Billboard's Adult Contemporary and Hot 100 and No. 12 on Casey's Top 40, while the video received regular airtime on MTV and VH1.

With the release of the album, the group launched a massive tour titled the Freakshow Tour, which took the trio across the United States, Canada, and Europe. The group released a live video titled Live in Concert: Welcome To The Freak Show which contained footage from the tour. An audio CD of the soundtrack from the video was also released under the same title, reaching No. 109 on the Billboard 200. The CD Welcome to the Freakshow was certified gold and won dc Talk another Grammy award.

The album is looked at by many as one of the greatest and most important albums to be released in Christian music.

=== Supernatural (1998–2000) ===
Supernatural, released in 1998, was their last all-new studio album. Upon release, the album overtook Jesus Freak to set a new record for the highest first week sales for a Christian release. It debuted at No. 4 on the Billboard 200 charts, an unprecedented feat for a Christian rock album. Supernatural abandoned the hip-hop/rap style found on the group's earlier releases to settle for the pop/rock sound. The group has stated in The Supernatural Experience video that this album was different; it was a collaborative effort of all three members. The singles for the album received their fair share of radio play on modern rock, contemporary Christian, and alternative outlets. The group then embarked on a 60-city tour across the United States titled, The Supernatural Experience. Footage from the tour was combined with interviews and released as The Supernatural Experience video and was certified gold for long form video.

In addition to touring and recording Supernatural, the members of the group went on to co-author a book titled Jesus Freaks in collaboration with The Voice of the Martyrs in 1999. The book contains the shortened biographies and incidents in the lives of famous and lesser-known Christians who stood up for their faith. Since then, the group has co-authored a series of other books.

In 2000, DC Talk hosted a show titled Intermission: A Decade of DC Talk. A compilation album titled Intermission: The Greatest Hits was then released, containing many of their previously recorded songs either remixed or in their original formats. Two new songs, "Chance" and "Sugar Coat It", were recorded for the album. Intermission reached No. 81 on the Billboard 200.

=== Continued success, hiatus, and other activities (2000–present) ===
In 2000, the members announced that they would be taking a break from the group to pursue solo efforts. They released Solo: Special Edition EP, which contained two new songs from each member's solo ventures and a live version of the U2 song "40" performed by all three members. The EP reached No. 142 on the Billboard 200 and won DC Talk their fourth Grammy award.

During their hiatus, DC Talk has continued to sporadically release singles together, including "Let's Roll" (2002), which was about the September 11 attacks. Multiple compilation albums have been released during their hiatus, including the 10th anniversary versions of their albums Free at Last (2002) and Jesus Freak (2006), as well as 8 Great Hits (2004), Freaked! (2006), The Early Years (2006), Greatest Hits (2007), and Back 2 Back Hits (2011). The three members still frequently show up at each other's shows and cover DC Talk songs. The band has also continued to help each other in their respective solo careers, including "Atmosphere" by tobyMac (2004), a cover of "The Cross" by Kevin Max (2007), and "Love Feels Like" by tobyMac (2015). Most recently, the band was featured on tobyMac's single "Space" (2022).

Group members TobyMac and Michael Tait, with assistance from Christian organization WallBuilders, collaborated on two books: Under God, published in 2004, and Living Under God: Discovering Your Part in God's Plan, published in 2005. Both books are collections of American history-inspired inspirational stories with a Christian perspective.

In 2010, the trio performed with Aaron Shust, Brandon Heath, Matthew West, Natalie Grant, Steven Curtis Chapman, Casting Crowns, and some other artists to serve as the backing choir for "Come Together Now", a song about the 2010 Haiti earthquakes. Later in the year, Kevin Max admitted that he would love to make more DC Talk music, but he thinks "that time has passed us by...". He then explained, "as individuals we are so different in our approaches that it might be quite a process." tobyMac released the song "Wonderin'" with his album Tonight; the song is "a warm look back at DC Talk" for Toby. On October 11, 2016, the trio came together to perform "Love Feels Like" at the Allen Arena in Nashville, Tennessee for the 47th Annual GMA Dove Awards.

In 2015, Gotee Records announced the issuance of Jesus Freak and Supernatural on vinyl.

In June 2025, following allegations of sexual assault made against Tait, many radio stations removed DC Talk and Newsboys (with whom Tait was the lead singer from 2009 to 2025) from circulation.

==== Reunion tour ====
In June 2010, Max tweeted that he was trying to arrange a reunion tour for "perhaps" 2011. In January 2011, TobyMac stated that a reunion tour would probably happen "sooner or later", but not in the near future. In January 2014, Tait indicated that he liked the sound of a "20-years-later" tour in 2015, but tobyMac commented that "nothing concrete is in the works" due to conflicting schedules.

DC Talk performed two concerts on July 13, 2017, and a third show on July 14, 2017 aboard the MSC Divina in the Bahamas on the reunion cruise. The group hinted at more reunions in the future.

In June 2019, the group performed on a second cruise. Tait stated in an interview that DC Talk would be doing a "land cruise" starting in 2020, though it never came to fruition.

== Group members ==
- Toby McKeehan – lead and backing vocals, keyboards, programming, sampler (1987–2002; 2015; 2017–2019; 2022)
- Michael Tait – lead and backing vocals (1987–2002; 2015; 2017–2019; 2022)
- Kevin Max – lead and backing vocals, keyboards, tambourine (1988–2002; 2015; 2017–2019; 2022)

=== Band ===
- Jason Halbert – keyboards, organ
- Brent Barcus – guitar
- Erick Cole – guitar
- Barry Graul – guitar
- Mark Lee Townsend – guitar
- Martin Upton – guitar
- Otto "Sugar Bear" Price – bass
- Will Denton – drums
- Rick Mayday May – drums
- Ric "DJ Form" Robbins – DJ
- Marvin Sims – percussion
- GRITS – choreography

== Discography ==
- 1989: DC Talk
- 1990: Nu Thang
- 1992: Free at Last
- 1995: Jesus Freak
- 1998: Supernatural

== Bibliography ==
By DC Talk

- Jesus Freaks (1999)
- Live Like a Jesus Freak (2001)
- Jesus Freaks: Promises for a Jesus Freak (2001)
- Jesus Freaks Volume II: Stories of Revolutionaries Who Changed Their World Fearing God, Not Man (2002)
- Jesus Freaks: Revolutionaries (2005)
- Jesus Freaks: Martyrs (2005)

By TobyMac and Michael Tait

- Under God, Bethany House, ISBN 0-7642-0008-9
- Living Under God: Discovering Your Part in God's Plan, Bethany House, ISBN 0-7642-0142-5

== Awards and nominations ==
=== Grammy Awards ===
| Year | Nominee / work | Award | Result |
|---|---|---|---|
| 1992 | Nu Thang | Best Rock/Contemporary Gospel Album | Nominated |
| 1993 | Free at Last | Grammy Award for Best Rock Gospel Album | Won |
| 1996 | Jesus Freak | Grammy Award for Best Rock Gospel Album | Won |
| 1997 | Welcome to the Freak Show | Grammy Award for Best Rock Gospel Album | Won |
| 1999 | Supernatural | Grammy Award for Best Pop/Contemporary Gospel Album | Nominated |
| 2001 | Solo | Grammy Award for Best Rock Gospel Album | Won |

=== Dove Awards ===
| Year | Nominee / work | Award | Result |
|---|---|---|---|
| 1992 | Rap, Rock, & Soul | Long Form Music Video of the Year | Won |
| 1992 | "I Love Rap Music" | Rap/Hip Hop Recorded Song of the Year | Won |
| 1993 | "Can I Get a Witness" | Rap/Hip Hop Recorded Song of the Year | Won |
| 1994 | "Socially Acceptable" | Rap/Hip Hop Recorded Song of the Year | Won |
| 1994 | "Jesus is Just Alright" | Rock Recorded Song of the Year | Won |
| 1994 | "Luv is a Verb" | Rap/Hip Hop Recorded Song of the Year | Won |
| 1996 | DC Talk | Artist of the Year | Won |
| 1996 | "Jesus Freak" | Song of the Year | Won |
| 1996 | "Jesus Freak" | Rock Recorded Song of the Year | Won |
| 1997 | "Between You and Me" | Pop/Contemporary Recorded Song of the Year | Won |
| 1997 | Jesus Freak | Rock Album of the Year | Won |
| 1997 | "Like It, Love It, Need It" | Rock Recorded Song of the Year | Won |
| 1997 | "Jesus Freak" | Short Form Music Video of the Year | Won |
| 1998 | "Colored People" | Short Form Music Video of the Year | Won |
| 1999 | DC Talk | Group of the Year | Nominated |
| 1999 | DC Talk | Artist of the Year | Nominated |
| 1999 | "My Friend (So Long)" | Rock Recorded Song of the Year | Nominated |
| 1999 | Supernatural | Pop/Contemporary Album of the Year | Nominated |
| 2000 | The Supernatural Experience | Long Form Music Video of the Year | Won |
| 2001 | "Dive" | Alternative/Modern Rock Song | Won |
| 2004 | Free at Last: The Movie (10th Anniversary) | Long Form Music Video of the Year | Nominated |
