= Sixpence None the Richer discography =

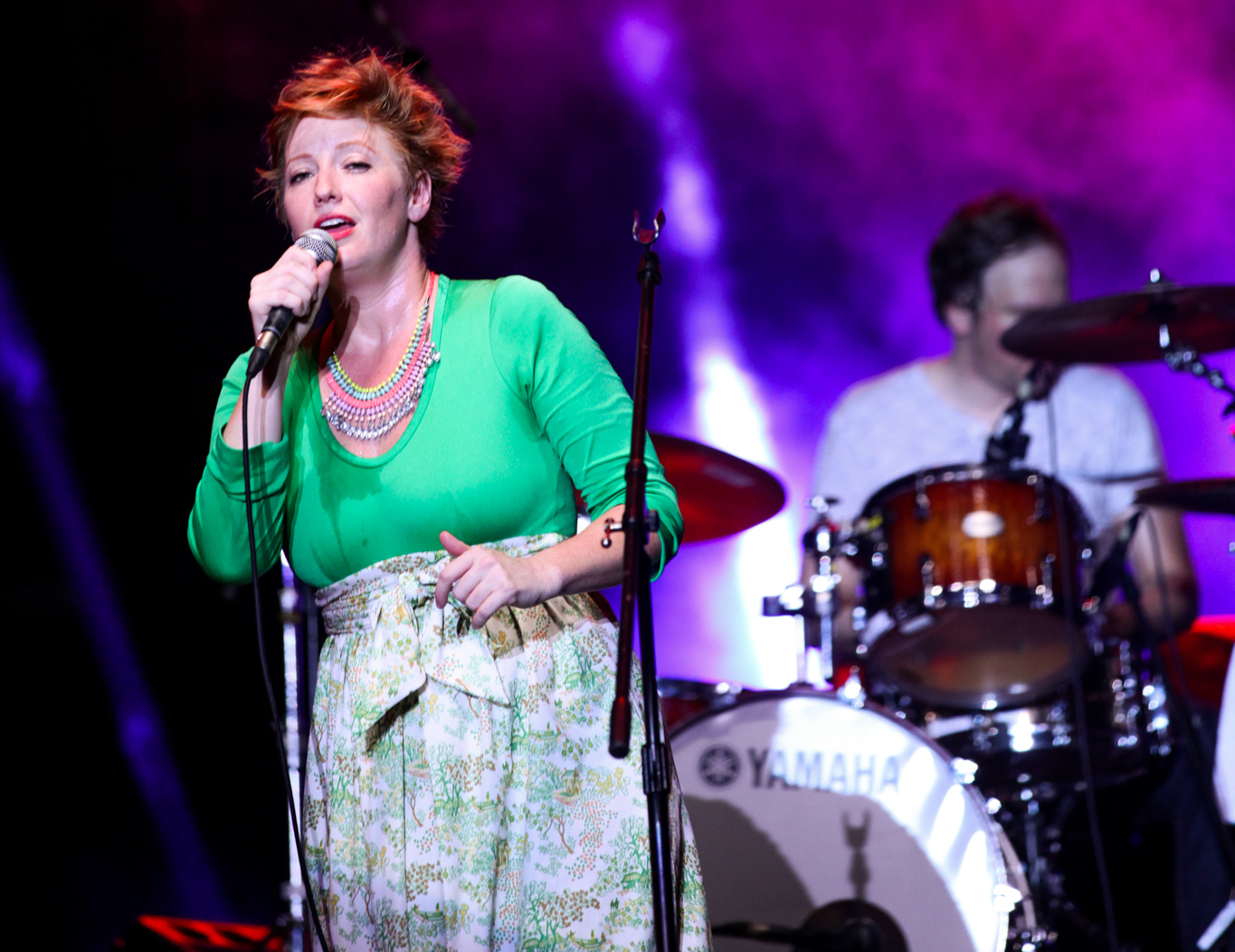
- Studio albums: 6
- Extended plays: 7
- Live albums: 1
- Compilation albums: 6
- Singles: 24
- Music videos: 12

American pop rock band Sixpence None the Richer has released six studio albums, six compilation albums, seven extended plays and 24 singles. They gained mainstream popularity in 1997 with their self-titled album, producing the hit single "Kiss Me", which was an international hit. The song topped the Australian charts, and reached the top five in New Zealand, the United Kingdom, and the band's native United States.

== Albums ==
=== Studio albums ===
List of albums, with selected chart positions and certifications
Title	Album details	Peak chart positions									Certifications
Title	Album details	US	US Christ	AUS	AUT	GER	NOR	NZ	SWI	UK	Certifications
The Fatherless and the Widow	Released: April 26, 1994; Label: R.E.X.; Format: CD, digital download	—	—	—	—	—	—	—	—	—	
This Beautiful Mess	Released: April 18, 1995; Label: R.E.X.; Format: CD, digital download	—	—	—	—	—	—	—	—	—	
Sixpence None the Richer	Released: November 22, 1997; Re-released: April 26, 1999; Label: Squint; Format: CD, CS, LP	89	1	79	32	57	16	45	26	27	RIAA: Platinum
Divine Discontent	Released: October 29, 2002; Label: Reprise; Format: CD, digital download	154	9	—	—	—	—	—	—	—	
The Dawn of Grace	Released: October 14, 2008; Re-released: November 15, 2024; Label: Nettwerk; Format: CD, digital download	—	47	—	—	—	—	—	—	—	
Lost in Transition	Released: August 7, 2012; Label: Credential; Format: CD, digital download	—	—	—	—	—	—	—	—	—	
"—" denotes releases that did not chart or were not released in that territory.

=== Live albums ===
Year	Title
2025	Live at Gruene Hall

=== Compilation albums ===
Year	Title
1998	Collage: A Portrait of Their Best
2004	The Best of Sixpence None the Richer; Includes 3 new tracks and 7 non-album tracks
2005	The Best of the Early Years
2010	Early Favorites
2010	Top Ten
2015	The Ultimate Collection

=== Box sets ===
Year	Title
2002	Mega 3 Collection
2011	Sixpence None the Richer/Divine Discontent

== Extended plays ==
Year	Title
1992	The Original Demos
1996	Tickets for a Prayer Wheel
2004	Sessions@AOL – EP
2005	Waiting On the Sun (Studio Series Performance Track) – EP
2008	My Dear Machine
2009	6 Picks (Essential Radio Hits) – EP
2024	Rosemary Hill

== Singles ==
Title	Year	Peak chart positions										Certifications (sales thresholds)	Album
Title	Year	US	US AC	US Adult	US Christ	US Pop	AUS	CAN	GER	NZ	UK	Certifications (sales thresholds)	Album
"Angeltread"	1995	—	—	—	—	—	—	—	—	—	—		This Beautiful Mess
"Within a Room Somewhere"	1995	—	—	—	7	—	—	—	—	—	—		This Beautiful Mess
"Thought Menagerie"	1995	—	—	—	19	—	—	—	—	—	—		This Beautiful Mess
"Kiss Me"	1998	2	2	2	— (Note: "Kiss Me" did not enter the Billboard Hot Christian Songs, but peaked at No. 6 on the Billboard Christian Digital Song Sales)	1	1	1	7	4	4	RIAA: 3× Platinum; ARIA: Platinum; BPI: 3× Platinum; RMNZ: 4× Platinum	Sixpence None the Richer
"Love"	1998	—	—	—	16	—	—	—	—	—	—		Sixpence None the Richer
"Brighten My Heart"	1998	—	—	—	8	—	—	—	—	—	—		Exodus
"There She Goes"	1999	32	19	7	— (Note: "There She Goes" did not enter the Billboard Hot Christian Songs, but peaked at No. 11 on the Billboard Christian Digital Song Sales)	13	47	13	67	17	14	RIAA: Gold; RMNZ: Gold	Sixpence None the Richer
"I Can't Catch You"	2000	—	—	—	—	—	—	—	—	—	—		Sixpence None the Richer
"Breathe"	2000	—	—	—	6	—	—	—	—	—	—		Streams
"Breathe Your Name"	2002	—	—	18	—	—	—	—	—	—	—		Divine Discontent
"Don't Dream It's Over"	2003	78	12	9	—	—	—	—	—	—	—		Divine Discontent
"Us"	2004	—	—	—	—	—	—	—	—	—	—		The Best of Sixpence None the Richer
"My Dear Machine"	2008	—	—	—	—	—	—	—	—	—	—		My Dear Machine
"Angels We Have Heard on High"	2008	—	—	—	— (Note: "Angels We Have Heard on High" did not enter the Billboard Hot Christian Songs, but peaked at No. 15 on the Billboard Christian Streaming Songs)	—	—	—	—	—	—		The Dawn of Grace
"Radio"	2012	—	—	—	—	—	—	—	—	—	—		Lost in Transition
"The Tide" (feat. Leigh Nash)	2023	—	—	—	—	—	—	—	—	—	—		Non-album singles
"Once In a Lifetime" (With The Ascendants feat. Leigh Nash)	2023	—	—	—	—	—	—	—	—	—	—		Non-album singles
"Ring, Ring the Bells"	2023	—	—	—	—	—	—	—	—	—	—		Non-album singles
"We Are Love"	2024	—	—	—	—	—	—	—	—	—	—		Rosemary Hill - EP
"Julia"	2024	—	—	—	—	—	—	—	—	—	—		Rosemary Hill - EP
"I Believe in Father Christmas" (Greg Lake cover)	2024	—	—	—	—	—	—	—	—	—	—		The Dawn of Grace (Deluxe)
"Kiss Me (Live at Gruene Hall)"	2025	—	—	—	—	—	—	—	—	—	—		Live at Gruene Hall
"Thread the Needle (Live at Gruene Hall)"	2025	—	—	—	—	—	—	—	—	—	—		Live at Gruene Hall
"Julia (Live at Gruene Hall)"	2025	—	—	—	—	—	—	—	—	—	—		Live at Gruene Hall
"—" denotes releases that did not chart

== Music videos ==
- "Angeltread" (1995)
- "Kiss Me (B&W Version)" (1998)
- "Kiss Me" (1998)
- "There She Goes" (1999)
- "Breathe Your Name" (2002)
- "Don't Dream It's Over" (2004)
- "My Dear Machine" (2008)
- "Angels We Have Heard on High" (2008)
- "Silent Night (feat. Dan Haseltine)" (2008)
- "Sooner Than Later" (2012)
- "Radio" (2012)
- "Rosemary Hill" (2024)

== Other appearances ==
Along with their albums, Sixpence has recorded a number of covers and original songs for compilations, including:

- 1994: "Bouquet" (Steve Taylor) – A Steve Taylor Tribute: I Predict a Clone (1994, label unknown)
- 1996: "Road to Zion" (Petra) Never Say Dinosaur (1996, Starsong / EMD)
- 1996: "You're a Mean One, Mr. Grinch" – Christmas in Heaven – Flying Tart Records Presents (1996; Flying Tart Records) (later re-released on Happy Christmas Vol. 2 1999)
- 1997: "Sad But True" – alternate track found only on the limited edition vinyl LP version of Sixpence's self-titled third album.
- 1998: "Brighten My Heart" – Exodus (1998, Rocketown Records)
- 1999: "Dancing Queen" (ABBA) – Dick (motion picture soundtrack, Virgin Records)
- 1999: "Trust 99" (LP Version) Songs From the Book (Word Entertainment)
- 1999: "Breathe" – Streams (Word Entertainment) (Later re-released on Word's 2011 compilation Songs That Defined a Decade, Vol. 3: Christian Hits of the 90's and 2013's The Iconic Groups of Christian Music)
- 2000: "With Every Breath," "You're Here" – City on a Hill: Songs of Worship and Praise (Essential Records)
- 2000: "Babe in the Straw" (Leigh Nash only) – One Silent Night (Word Entertainment)
- 2000: "The Ground You Shook" – Roaring Lambs (Squint)
- 2000: "I Need Love" (Sam Phillips) Here on Earth (motion picture soundtrack) (Sony)
- 2000: "Need to Be Next to You" and "Love (Remix)" – Bounce (Music From and Inspired By the Miramax Motion Picture) (RCA Records, a division of Sony Music Entertainment)
- 2002: "Silent Night" (traditional) – City on a Hill: It's Christmas Time (Essential Records)
- 2002: "Goodnight Children Everywhere" (Vera Lynn) – For the Kids (Nettwerk)
- 2003: "Christmastime is Here" (Vince Guaraldi) – WOW Christmas: 30 Top Christian Artists and Holiday Songs (Word Entertainment) (Later re-released on You're Here, 2009, Word)
- 2003: "I Just Wasn't Made for These Times" (The Beach Boys) – Making God Smile: An Artists' Tribute to the Songs of Beach Boy Brian Wilson
- 2003: "Beautiful Scandalous Night" (with Bebo Norman) (The Choir) – City on a Hill: The Gathering (Essential Records)
- 2003: "On the Run" (Electric Light Orchestra) – Lynne Me Your Ears – A Tribute to the Music of Jeff Lynne (Not Lame Recordings)
- 2003: "It Came Upon a Midnight Clear" (traditional) – Maybe This Christmas Too? (Nettwerk) (also released on Nettwerk's A Winter's Night in 2005, and on 2006's Christmas Present: New Holiday Traditions, Warner Music)
- 2004: "Love is Blindness" (U2) – In the Name of Love: Artists United for Africa (Sparrow Records)
- 2004: "Every Heartbeat" (Amy Grant) – Charlie Peacock: Full Circle: A Celebration of Songs and Friends (Sparrow Records)
- 2008: "Carol of the Bells" (traditional) – What I Want for Christmas... (Nettwerk)
- 2008: "Christmas for Two" – Merry Happy Christmas (Nettwerk)
- 2009: "Wayfaring Stranger" (traditional folk) – The Village (429 Records & SLG, LLC)
- 2011: "I Won't Share You" (The Smiths) – Please, Please, Please – A Tribute to The Smiths (American Laundromat Records)
- 2012: "Angels We Have Heard on High" (traditional) – Isn't This World Enough?? A Nettwerk Christmas (Nettwerk)
- 2017: "Angels We Have Heard on High" and "The Last Christmas Without You" – Maybe This Christmas Vol 7: Country Sleigh Ride (Nettwerk)
- 2022: "Until Your Love Broke Through" (Randy Stonehill) – There's A Rainbow Somewhere (The Songs Of Randy Stonehill)

Many songs that Sixpence had recorded for their own albums reappeared on later compilations. These include:

- 1997: "Kiss Me" – Originally released on Sixpence None the Richer (album). Later appeared on:
  - Lilith Fair: A Celebration of Women in Music, Vol. 3 (Live) (1999, Nettwerk)
  - How to Lose a Guy In 10 Days (Music From the Motion Picture) (2003, Virgin Records America, Inc)
  - WOW #1s (2005, Provident Label Group LLC, a unit of Sony Music Entertainment)
  - Kiss Me – Songs of Love & Romance (2011, Word Entertainment LLC, A Warner/Curb Company)
  - Whatever: Pop Hits of the '90s (2011, Rhino Entertainment Company, a Warner Music Group Company)
  - WORD: Six Decades of Hits (2011, Word Entertainment LLC, A Warner/Curb Company) – This version is referred to as "Top Ten Edit."
- 1997: "Love" – Originally released on Sixpence None the Richer (album). Later appeared on:
  - One (2000, Word Entertainment) – This version is referred to as "Ben Grosse Remix."
  - Mercy Streets Soundtrack (2000, NSoul Records) – This version is referred to as "Remix." At the time of writing, it is unknown if this is the same remix as the one listed above.
- 1999: "There She Goes" (The La's)– Originally released on Sixpence None the Richer (album). Later appeared on:
  - This Is Alice Music, Volume 7 (2003)
- 2002: "Breathe Your Name" – Originally recorded for Divine Discontent. Later appeared on:
  - WOW Hits 2004 (EMI Christian Music Group, Inc., Word Entertainment LLC, Provident Label Group)
- 2002: "Don't Dream It's Over" (Crowded House) – Originally recorded for Divine Discontent. Later appeared on:
  - Smallville: The Talon Mix (Original Soundtrack) (2005, Elektra)
  - CrossCuts: Top Pop Hits Performed By Your Favorite Christian Artists (2008, Word Entertainment)
- 2002: "Melody of You" – Originally recorded for Divine Discontent. Later appeared on:
  - Felicity (Senior Year) (series soundtrack) (2002, Nettwerk Productions)
- 2009: "Us" – Originally appeared on The Best of Sixpence None the Richer as a new track. Later appeared on:
  - Dare to Love: Songs of Unconditional Love for Couples (2009, Word Entertainment LLC, A Warner/Curb Company)
