= The Best of Sixpence None the Richer =

Greatest hits album by Sixpence None the Richer
- Released: October 26, 2004
- Recorded: 1993–2004
- Genre: Pop rock, alternative rock
- Length: 76:14 (Non-US)
- Label: Squint

Sixpence None the Richer chronology
Divine Discontent (2002)	The Best of Sixpence None the Richer (2004)	My Dear Machine (2008)

Professional ratings
Review scores
Source	Rating
AbsolutePunk	(80%)
AllMusic	4/5 stars

The Best of Sixpence None the Richer is a greatest hits album of American band Sixpence None the Richer, released in 2004 (see 2004 in music). It contains all their most successful songs as well as various rarities, covers and three new tracks that had originally been intended to be released on Divine Discontent but were shelved.

== Track listing ==
All songs by Matt Slocum, except where noted. Parenthetical items indicate on which album the song originally appeared.

=== Standard Edition ===
1. "Loser Like Me" – 3:35 (New Recording)
2. "Us" – 4:24 (New Recording)
3. "Too Far Gone" – 6:39 (New Recording)
4. "The Ground You Shook" – 4:20 (Roaring Lambs)
5. "Kiss Me" – 3:30 (Sixpence None the Richer)
6. "Breathe Your Name" – 3:58 (Divine Discontent)
7. "Melody of You" – 4:52 (Divine Discontent)
8. "Dancing Queen" (Stig Anderson, Benny Andersson, Björn Ulvaeus) – 4:04 (Dick: Soundtrack from the Motion Picture)
9. "Don't Dream It's Over" (Neil Finn) – 4:04 (Divine Discontent)
10. "There She Goes" (Lee Mavers) – 2:45 (Sixpence None the Richer)
11. "I Need Love" (Sam Phillips) – 4:14 (Here on Earth soundtrack)
12. "I Just Wasn't Made For These Times" (Brian Wilson, Tony Asher) – 3:04 (Making God Smile: An Artists' Tribute to the Songs of Beach Boy Brian Wilson)
13. "Breathe" (John Mallory, Leigh Nash, Michelle Tumes) – 4:07 (Streams)
14. "Brighten My Heart" – 4:40 (Exodus)
15. "Angeltread" – 3:28 (This Beautiful Mess)
16. "Within a Room Somewhere" – 5:06 (This Beautiful Mess)
17. "Trust" – 3:23 (The Fatherless and the Widow)
18. "Kiss Me" (Japanese Version) – 3:18

=== Asian Edition ===
1. "Kiss Me" – 3:30
2. "Loser Like Me" – 3:35
3. "Need to Be Next to You" (Diane Warren) – 4:09 (Bounce soundtrack)
4. "Breathe" – 4:07
5. "Dancing Queen" – 4:04
6. "Melody of You" – 4:52
7. "I Can't Catch You" – 4:14 (Sixpence None the Richer)
8. "I Just Wasn't Made for These Times" – 3:04
9. "There She Goes" – 2:45
10. "Don't Dream It's Over" – 4:04
11. "I Need Love" – 4:14
12. "Breathe Your Name" – 3:58
13. "Us" – 4:24
14. "The Ground You Shook" – 4:20
15. "Too Far Gone" – 6:39
16. "Waiting on the Sun" (Ron Aniello, Jason Wade) – 2:54 (Divine Discontent)
17. "Brighten My Heart" – 4:40
18. "Trust" – 3:23
19. "Kiss Me" (Japanese Version) – 3:18

Taiwan special edition bonus VCD

1. Kiss Me (Music Video)
2. There She Goes (Music Video)
3. Breathe Your Name (Music Video)
4. Don't Dream It's Over (Music Video)

== Production ==
- Mark Lusk – Artist Development
- Katherine Petillo – Creative Direction
- Jonathan Richter – Illustration & Design
- Matthew Welch – Photography
- Mark Joseph & Rachel Williams – Liner Notes
