= Leigh Nash discography =

- Studio albums: 3
- Extended plays: 5
- Soundtrack albums: 11
- Singles: 8
- Music videos: 7

American singer-songwriter Leigh Nash has released three studio albums and five extended plays as well as a number of collaborations.

== Studio albums ==
Title	Album details	Chart positions		
Title	Album details	US Heat	US Country	US Christian
Blue on Blue	Released: August 15, 2006; Label: One Son/Nettwerk; Format: CD, music download	25	—	19
Hymns and Sacred Songs	Released: November 15, 2011; Label: EMI Christian Music Group; Format: CD, music download	—	—	—
The State I'm In	Released: September 18, 2015; Label: One Son Records; Format: CD, music download	18	39	—
"—" denotes releases that did not chart

== Extended plays ==
Title	Details	Label
My Idea of Heaven	Released: May 29, 2006; 4 tracks: 2 songs with 2 versions each	Nettwerk Productions
My Idea of Heaven Remixed	Released: October 24, 2006; 4 tracks: 1 song with 4 versions	Nettwerk Productions
Wishing for This	Released: November 14, 2006; Christmas EP; 7 tracks	One Son/Nettwerk
Remixed 2	Released: November 28, 2006; 3 tracks: remixed versions of songs from Blue on Blue	One Son Records
Connect Sets	Released: July 3, 2007; 5 tracks: acoustic versions of songs from Blue on Blue	One Son/Sony Connect
Daytrotter Session	Exclusive at Noisetrade; Released: April 18, 2016; 4 tracks	Bill Graham Archives
Limited Edition EP	Only available at live shows; 6 tracks	One Son Records
Get Happy	Released: February 14, 2020; 6 tracks	Leigh Nash / Tone Tree Music
The Tide, Vol. 1	Released: September 24, 2021; 6 tracks; Includes collaborations with Vince Gill, Tanya Tucker, CeCe Winans, Raul Malo and Ruby Amanfu	Visionary Media Group
The Tide Acoustic Sessions	Released: December 2, 2022; 6 tracks: acoustic versions of songs from The Tide, Vol. 1, collaboration with Ruby Amanfu	Visionary Media Group
The Tide, Vol. 2	To be released: February 7, 2025; 6 tracks; Includes collaborations with Sixpence None the Richer, Villiers, Roland Orzabal, Olivia Slocum and Wendy Moten	Visionary Media Group

== Singles ==
Year	Single	Peak positions		
Year	Single	US Adult	US AC	AUS
2000	"Need to Be Next to You"	23	21	94
2006	"My Idea of Heaven"	—	—	—
2006	"Baby, It's Cold Outside"	—	—	—
2007	"Ocean Size Love"	—	—	—
2008	"Stars in My Eyes"	—	—	—
2012	"Give Myself To You"	—	—	—
2012	"Saviour Like A Shepherd Lead Us (Blessed Jesus)"	—	—	—
2015	"Somebody's Yesterday"	—	—	—
2017	"Christmas on the Phone"	—	—	—
2018	"Don't Get Me Wrong"	—	—	—
2019	"Kiss Me (20th Anniversary Edition)" / "God Gave Me Horses"	—	—	—
2019	"My Love My Drug"	—	—	—
2019	"Don't Let Me Die in Dallas"	—	—	—
2019	"Pretty Paper"	—	—	—
2021	"Good Trouble" (with Ruby Amanfu)	—	—	—
2021	"Made For This" (with Stephen Wilson Jr.)	—	—	—
2021	"Never Again, Every Time" (with Tanya Tucker)	—	—	—
2022	"Joy to the World"	—	—	—
2022	"Made For This (The Tide Acoustic Sessions)"	—	—	—
2022	"Good Trouble (The Tide Acoustic Sessions)" (with Ruby Amanfu)	—	—	—
2022	"Never Again, Every Time (The Tide Acoustic Sessions)"	—	—	—
2022	"Your Song (The Tide Acoustic Sessions)"	—	—	—
2022	"I Need Thee Every Hour (The Tide Acoustic Sessions)"	—	—	—
2022	"God Gave Me Horses (The Tide Acoustic Sessions)"	—	—	—
2023	"The Tide" (with Sixpence None the Richer)	—	—	—
2024	"Unraveling" (feat. Roland Orzabal of Tears for Fears)	—	—	—
2024	"Cry" (with Villiers)	—	—	—
2024	"Cry (Fear of Tigers Remix)" (with Villiers)	—	—	—

== Collaborations ==
=== Albums ===
Year	Title	Album details
2007	Fauxliage (with Delerium)	Release date: August 14, 2007; Label: Nettwerk; Format: CD, music download

=== Singles ===
Year	Title	Artist	Album
1997	"In Your Hand"	The Kid Brothers of St. Frank	Canticle of the Plains
1997	"Buenas Noches From Nacogdoches"	The Kid Brothers of St. Frank	Canticle of the Plains
2000	"Innocente (Falling in Love)"	Delerium	Poem
2001	"The End of the World" (Skeeter Davis cover)	Los Straitjackets	Sing Along With Los Straitjackets
2003	"Run for It"	Delerium	Chimera
2003	"Orbit of Me"	Delerium	Chimera
2004	"She is Like the Swallow"	Lucia Micarelli	Music from a Farther Room
2006	"New Day Rising"	Rin'	Inland Sea
2006	"Never Knew What Love Meant"	Rin'	Inland Sea
2006	"Sea of Tranquility"	Rin'	Inland Sea
2006	"Mirror and Smoke"	Jars of Clay	Good Monsters
2006	"Happy Christmas"	Sarah McLachlan	Live From Etown: 2006 Christmas Special
2008	"Every Kinda People"	Grady Nichols	Take Me With You
2012	"After All"	The Choir	The Loudest Sound Ever Heard
2013	"Under the Gun"	Conjure One	Holoscenic
2016	"Rhythm of the Road"	The Choir	non-album singles
2017	"Under the Gun [Kago Pengchi Remix]"	Conjure One	non-album singles
2017	"Blowing Me Kisses"	John Stamp	Franklin54
2017	"After All [Reimagined Remix]"	The Choir	non-album singles
2019	"Innocente [Sam Mitcham Remix]"	Delerium	non-album singles
2019	"Dime Adiós (Say Goodbye to Me)"	Matt Lovell	Nobody Cries Today
2019	"Dezembro"	Darko	non-album singles
2020	"What You Think I Am (Reimagined)"	The Choir	non-album singles
2021	"Welcome To Our World"	Marc Martel	Hark!
2021	"Someday At Christmas"	John Tibbs	non-album singles
2022	"Innocente (Falling in Love) [Lost Witness Remix Edit]"	Delerium	non-album singles
2023	"When We're Still You Speak"	Tim West	non-album singles
2023	"Wildflowers"	The Hound + The Fox	Star Songs: Lullabies for the Whole Family
2023	"Once In a Lifetime"	The Ascendants & Sixpence None the Richer	non-album singles
2023	"Baby, It's Cold Outside"	The Choir	non-album singles

== Compilations ==
Year	Title	Artist	Album
1998	"O Holy Night" (feat. Michael Tait)	—	City On a Hill - It's Christmas Time
2000	"Precious Jesus"	The Choir	City on a Hill: Songs of Worship and Praise
2000	"With Every Breath"	Dan Haseltine	City on a Hill: Songs of Worship and Praise
2000	"Babe in Straw"	—	One Silent Night
2003	"Kyrie Eleison"	Friends	City on a Hill: The Gathering
2005	"Mistletoe & Holly"	—	Sounds of the Season NBC 2005
2005	"The First Noel"	—	A Winter's Night: The Best of Nettwerk Christmas Albums
2005	"Innocente (Falling in Love)" (Deep Dish Mix)	Delerium	Plastic - Club Hits, Vol. 1
2006	"Wasn't It Good"	—	Sweet Nothings
2006	"Baby, It's Cold Outside" (feat. Gabe Dixon)	—	Do You Hear What I Hear?
2007	"Wishing for This"	—	Canadian Tire Christmas Moments: Volume 2
2007	"Crazy"	—	Sony/ATV Nashville Classic Covers: Volume One
2008	"Last Christmas"	—	What I Want For Christmas...
2008	"Maybe This Christmas"	—	Merry Happy Christmas
2010	"With Every Breath" (feat. Dan Haseltine & Leigh Nash)	City On A Hill	WOW Hits 2002 (The Year's 30 Top Christian Artists And Hits)
2010	"Blessed Redeemer"	—	Modern Hymnal 2.0
2011	"Good (Adam & Eve)" (feat. Matthew West)	—	Music Inspired by The Story
2011	"O Holy Night"	—	A Winter's Night 2011
2011	"Praise The Lord Who Reigns Above"	—	Love Divine - The Hymns of Charles Wesley
2011	"Innocente (Falling in Love)" (feat. Leigh Nash)	Delerium	Hotel Chill 2
2011	"O Sacred and Immortal Day"	—	Christmas Hymns & Carols
2012	"Deeper Than You Know" (feat. Marc Scibilia)	—	The 2012 Paste Holiday Sampler
2013	"Draw Near To God" (with Russ Taff)	—	Fanny Crosby & Friends - It Was Love

== Soundtrack ==
Year	Title	Movie
2000	"Need to Be Next to You"	Bounce
2003	"Charmed Life"	Uptown Girls
2004	"Father & Son"	Everwood
2005	"I've Gotta See You Smile"	Because of Winn-Dixie
2005	"Happy to Love You"(unreleased)	Mom at Sixteen
2006	"Beautiful World"	Charlotte's Web
2007	"A Place for Us"	Bridge to Terabithia
2007	"Hole in the Bucket"	The Simple Life: Camp Songs
2007	"The First Noel"	Fred Claus
2008	"My Idea of Heaven"	Wedding Daze
2010	"Beautiful World"	Charlotte's Web
2014	"Ready For The Storm"	Ragamuffin: The True Story of Rich Mullins
2021	"Heaven On Earth"	Playing God

== Music videos ==
Year	Song	Director
2000	"Need to Be Next to You"	
2001	"Innocente (Falling in Love)" (with Delerium)	
2006	"My Idea of Heaven"	
2012	"Give Myself To You"	
2012	"Saviour Like A Shepherd Lead Us (Blessed Jesus)"	
2013	"Under the Gun" (with Conjure One)	William Murray
2015	"Doing It Wrong"	Matt Bizer
2021	"Good Trouble" (with Ruby Amanfu)	Tim Cofield
2021	"Made For This" (with Stephen Wilson Jr.)	Tim Cofield
2021	"Never Again Every Time" (with Tanya Tucker)	
2024	"Cry" (with Villiers)	
2024	"Cry (Fear of Tigers Remix)" (with Villiers)	
