= Blue on blue =

Blue on blue may refer to:

== Music ==
- "Blue on Blue" (song), a 1963 hit song recorded by Bobby Vinton
  - Blue on Blue (Bobby Vinton album), 1963
- Blue on Blue (Leigh Nash album), 2006
- "Blue on Blue" (James Blunt song), a 2013 song by James Blunt
- "Blue on Blue" (Pet Shop Boys song), a c. 2006 song by the Pet Shop Boys

== Television ==
- "Blue on Blue" (Ugly Betty), an episode of Ugly Betty
- "Blue on Blue" (Under the Dome), an episode of Under the Dome

== Other ==
- Blue on Blue (book), a 2017 book about police misconduct by Charles Campisi and Gordon Dillow
- Blue on blue (military), inadvertent firing towards an allied NATO military force
