= Streams (1999 album) =

1999 compilation album

Streams is a 1999 album by various artists in the contemporary Christian music genre. Streams is a loose concept album focusing on the themes of pain and healing. In addition to the vocalists, the Irish Film Orchestra contributes instrumental scores to the album.

== Track listing ==
1. "Job" (Cindy Morgan, Loren Balman) – 5:04; performed by Cindy Morgan
2. "Don't Give Up" (Peter Gabriel) – 6:52; performed by Maire Brennan and Michael McDonald
3. "Breathe" (Leigh Nash) – 4:03; performed by Sixpence None the Richer
4. "Sanctuary" (Balman, Mark Harris, Michael W. Smith) – 4:32; performed by Chris Rodriguez
5. "Hold On" (Brent Bourgeois, Morgan) – 4:25; performed by Michelle Tumes
6. "The Only Thing I Need" (Bourgeois) – 5:01; performed by 4Him and Jon Anderson
7. "Find Me In the River" – (Martin Smith) – 5:48; performed by Delirious? and Amy Grant
8. "I Will Rest In You" (Bourgeois, Tumes) – 5:11; performed by Jaci Velasquez
9. "From Above" (Steven Delopoulos) – 5:15; performed by Burlap to Cashmere
10. "Forever On and On" (Gordon Kennedy, Jimmie Lee Sloas) – 5:29; performed by Point of Grace
11. "Orchestral Suite: For Cova" (Morgan, Carl Marsh) – 5:16; performed by The Irish Film Orchestra
12. "Orchestral Suite: Abigail" (Marsh, Michael W. Smith) – 4:43; performed by The Irish Film Orchestra
13. "Orchestral Suite: Delaney McDowell" (Marsh, Martin Smith) – 5:02; performed by The Irish Film Orchestra
14. "Orchestral Suite: Streams (for John Cole)" (Marsh, Morgan) – 5:48; performed by The Irish Film Orchestra

== Personnel ==
- Matt Rollings – acoustic piano (1, 14)
- Brent Bourgeois – keyboards (2, 5, 6, 8), backing vocals (2, 4, 5), acoustic piano (3, 10, 13), arrangements (13)
- Michael W. Smith – keyboards (4), programming (4), loops (4)
- Kent Hooper – additional keyboards (5, 8)
- Tim Jupp – keyboards (7)
- Tedd T – programming (7)
- Michael Quinlan – additional programming (7)
- Josh Zandman – acoustic piano (9)
- Phil Madeira – Hammond B3 organ (10)
- Robin Crow – acoustic guitar (2, 6, 8, 13)
- Chris Rodriguez – electric guitar (2, 4, 5, 6, 8, 9), backing vocals (4)
- Matt Slocum – electric guitar (3)
- Stuart Garrard – electric guitar (7)
- Martin Smith – electric guitar (7), lead vocals (7)
- Jon Anderson (of Yes (band)) - lead vocals (6)
- Steve Delopoulos – acoustic guitar (9), lead vocals (9)
- Johnny Philippides – acoustic guitar (9), backing vocals (9)
- Tom Hemby – acoustic guitar (10)
- Gordon Kennedy – acoustic guitar (10), electric guitar (10)
- Phil Keaggy – Ebow (13)
- Larry Tagg – bass (2, 5, 6, 8)
- Justin Cary – bass (3)
- Jimmie Lee Sloas – bass (4, 10)
- Jon Thatcher – bass (7)
- Craig Young – bass (9)
- Chris McHugh – drums (2, 4, 5, 6, 8)
- Dale Baker – drums (3)
- Stewart Smith – drums (7), percussion (7)
- Aaron Smith – drums (9)
- Steve Brewster – drums (10)
- Eric Darken – percussion (2, 3, 5, 6, 8–11, 13)
- Davy Spillane – Uilleann pipes (2, 9, 13), low whistle (2, 9, 13)
- Carl Marsh – arrangements and conductor (11–14)
- Caitriona Walsh – string contractor
- The Irish Film Orchestra – strings
- Maire Brennan – backing vocals (2, 11, 13)
- Leigh Nash – lead vocals (3)
- Michelle Tumes – backing vocals (3–6, 8, 13)
- Shelley Breen – backing vocals (5, 8)

Production

- Brent Bourgeois – producer
- Delirious? – producer (7)
- Lynn Nichols – producer (7)
- Brown Bannister – producer (10)
- Loren Balman – co-producer, executive producer
- Linda Bourne Wornell – A&R coordinator
- David Schober – engineer (1–9, 11–14)
- Steve Bishir – engineer (10)
- Julian Kindred – additional engineer
- Jim McCaslin – additional engineer
- Mike Elsner – additional string engineer
- Rob Evans – additional string engineer
- David Rand Martin – additional string engineer
- Darren Moran – additional string engineer
- Greg Parker – additional string engineer
- David Schober – mixing
- Dark Horse Recording Studio, Franklin, Tennessee – recording studio (1–6, 8, 9, 11–14)
- Ocean Way Recording, Hollywood, California – recording studio (7)
- Sound Emporium, Nashville, Tennessee – recording studio (10)
- Antenna Studios, Franklin, Tennessee – additional recording location
- Windmill Lane Studios, Dublin, Ireland – string recording location
- Dark Horse Recording – mixing location
- Doug Sax – mastering at The Mastering Lab (Hollywood, California)
- Loren Balman – art direction
- Chuck Hargett – art direction, design
- Robert M. Ascroft – talent photography
- Loren Balman – cover and streams photography
- Robin Geary – hair and make-up
- Tracy Kujawa – styling
