= Wishing for This =

EP by Leigh Nash
- Released: November 14, 2006
- Recorded: 2006
- Genre: Alternative rock; indie pop; Christmas; country
- Length: 24:10
- Label: Nettwerk
- Producer: Mark Nash, Nate Blackstone

Leigh Nash chronology
Blue on Blue (2006)	Wishing for This (2006)	Fauxliage (2007)

Professional ratings
Review scores
Source	Rating
Jesus Freak Hideout	3.5/5 stars

Wishing for This is a Christmas EP by the alternative rock and indie pop artist and Sixpence None the Richer member Leigh Nash. It was released for download on November 14, 2006. Wishing for This was produced by Mark Nash and Nate Blackstone and is made up of seven tracks: one traditional Christmas song, "O Holy Night", one original Christmas tune (the title track), and five cover tunes.

== Track listing ==
1. "Baby, It's Cold Outside" (featuring Gabe Dixon) (Frank Loesser) - 3:16
2. "Maybe This Christmas" (Ron Sexsmith) - 2:23
3. "Last Christmas" (George Michael) - 3:35
4. "O Holy Night" - 4:02
5. "Hard Candy Christmas" (Carol Hall) - 3:23
6. "Eternal Gifts" (Kate York) - 3:57
7. "Wishing for This" (Leigh Nash) - 3:39
