= Charmed Life =

Charmed Life may refer to:

- Charmed Life (novel), a 1977 novel by Diana Wynne Jones
- A Charmed Life, a 1955 novel by Mary McCarthy
- Charmed Life (Billy Idol album), 1990
- Charmed Life (Half Japanese album), 1988
- "Charmed Life", a song by Mick Jagger from The Very Best of Mick Jagger
- "Charmed Life", a song by Leigh Nash
