= Lost in Transition =

Sixth studio album by Sixpence None the Richer

Studio album by Sixpence None the Richer
- Released: August 7, 2012
- Recorded: 2008–2010
- Genres: Alternative rock, pop rock
- Length: 41:49
- Label: Credential
- Producers: Jim Scott, Daniel Tashian

Sixpence None the Richer chronology
The Dawn of Grace (2008)	Lost in Transition (2012)

Professional ratings
Review scores
Source	Rating
AllMusic	4/5 stars
Christianity Today	4/5 stars
Jesus Freak Hideout	4/5 stars
NewReleaseTuesday.com	5/5 stars
The Phantom Tollbooth.org	4.5/5 stars
UnderTheGunReview.net	6/10 stars

Lost in Transition is the sixth studio album by Sixpence None the Richer. The album was released on August 7, 2012. It is the first album full of mostly original material since 2002's Divine Discontent. The interim period included several new tracks for a greatest hits album, several solo projects for lead singer Leigh Nash, a 2008 album containing mostly Christmas standards, and My Dear Machine EP. "My Dear Machine", "Sooner Than Later", and "Give It Back" (under the title "Amazing Grace [Give It Back]") all appeared on the EP, although the latter two were completely re-recorded. Although not classified as country, a few songs are noted to have a country style in their sound, particularly the tracks "Sooner Than Later" and "Go Your Way" in the latter half of the album. Nash, who grew up in Texas, would go on to release a solo country album in 2015 titled The State I'm In.

== Track listing ==
No.	Title	Writer(s)	Length
1.	"My Dear Machine"	Slocum, Jamieson, Tashian	2:48
2.	"Radio"	Slocum, Ashworth	3:33
3.	"Give It Back"	Slocum, Nash, Fitchuk	4:46
4.	"Safety Line"	Slocum, Shive	4:37
5.	"When You Call Me"	Nash, Stephen Wilson Jr.	3:23
6.	"Should Not Be This Hard"	Slocum, Wilson	3:15
7.	"Go Your Way"	Slocum, Ashworth	3:13
8.	"Failure"	Slocum	3:32
9.	"Don't Blame Yourself"	Slocum, Ashworth	3:38
10.	"Stand My Ground"	Nash, Wilson	2:39
11.	"Sooner Than Later"	Nash, Wilson	3:35
12.	"Be OK"	Slocum, Jamieson, Tashian	2:50
Total length:			41:49

iTunes bonus track
No.	Title	Writer(s)	Length
13.	"I Do"	Slocum	3:54
Total length:			45:43

== Personnel ==
- Leigh Nash – vocals
- Matt Slocum – guitar, cello
- Justin Cary – bass, baritone guitar
- Will Sayles – drums, percussion, photography
- Jim Scott – producer, engineer, mixing, percussion (2–12)
- Daniel Tashian – producer (1)
- Jason Lehning – keyboards (1), mixing
- John Painter – horns (1)
- Cason Cooley – keyboards (2–12)
- Greg Leisz – pedal steel guitar, lap steel guitar (2–12)
- Kevin Dean – additional engineer (2–12)
- Bob Ludwig – mastering
- Don Clark – art direction, design
