= Sixpence None the Richer (album) =

- Standard artwork

Studio album by Sixpence None the Richer
- Released: November 22, 1997
- Studios: The Carport, Chelsea, The White House (Nashville)
- Genres: Alternative rock; Christian rock; pop rock; art pop
- Length: 50:45
- Labels: Squint; Elektra
- Producer: Steve Taylor

Sixpence None the Richer chronology
| This Beautiful Mess (1995) | Sixpence None the Richer (1997) | Divine Discontent (2002) |

Singles from Sixpence None the Richer
- 1. "Kiss Me" Released: August 12, 1998; 2. "There She Goes" Released: July 12, 1999; 3. "I Can't Catch You" Released: 2000

Professional ratings
Review scores
| Source | Rating |
|---|---|
| AllMusic | 4/5 stars |
| Cross Rhythms | 10/10 squares |
| Exit Zine | 5/5 stars |
| Melody Maker | 4/5 stars |
| NME | 2/10 |
| Q | 3/5 stars |
| The Village Voice | C+ |

Sixpence None the Richer is the third studio album by American band Sixpence None the Richer. The album released in November 22, 1997. It was certified platinum by the RIAA on February 9, 2000, for a million certified units in the United States and was nominated for a Grammy Award for Best Rock Gospel Album at the 41st Annual Grammy Awards.

== Track listing ==
All songs written by Matt Slocum, except where noted.

Sixpence None the Richer – Standard Edition track listing
| No. | Title | Lyrics | Music | Length |
|---|---|---|---|---|
| 1. | "We Have Forgotten" | | | 5:07 |
| 2. | "Anything" | | | 4:44 |
| 3. | "The Waiting Room" | Slocum | Slocum; Chris Donohue | 5:15 |
| 4. | "Kiss Me" | | | 3:30 |
| 5. | "Easy to Ignore" | Leigh Nash | Nash | 3:52 |
| 6. | "Puedo Escribir" | Pablo Neruda | Slocum; Dale Baker; J.J. Plasencio | 3:45 |
| 7. | "I Can't Catch You" | | | 4:12 |
| 8. | "The Lines of My Earth" | | | 4:26 |
| 9. | "Sister, Mother" | | | 3:05 |
| 10. | "I Won't Stay Long" | Sam Ashworth | Ashworth | 2:15 |
| 11. | "Love" | | | 3:56 |
| 12. | "Moving On" | Slocum | Slocum; Donohue | 3:56 |
| 13. | "There She Goes" | Lee Mavers | Mavers | 2:42 |
| Total length: | | | | 50:45 |

Sixpence None the Richer – Deluxe Anniversary Edition track listing
| No. | Title | Writer(s) | Length |
|---|---|---|---|
| 14. | "The Tide" | Nash; Slocum; Ruby Amanfu; Ashworth | 3:32 |
| 15. | "Sad But True" | | 4:00 |
| 16. | "Kiss Me (Acoustic)" | | 3:13 |
| 17. | "There She Goes (Acoustic)" | Mavers | 2:45 |
| Total length: | | | 64:15 |

Notes

- "There She Goes" did not appear on the album until a re-release in 1999. On the limited edition vinyl LP, the song "Sad But True" replaces "Puedo Escribir" and "Easy to Ignore". The 2024 Deluxe Anniversary Edition was released on 180-gram double vinyl (including standard black, limited edition orange, and limited edition green olive variants), CD, and streaming platforms, and contains all previously released tracks as well as four additional tracks.

== Personnel ==
Sixpence None the Richer

- Leigh Nash – vocals
- Matt Slocum – guitars, cello, string arrangements, Wurlitzer electric piano (3, 10)
- Dale Baker – drums, percussion

Additional personnel

- J.J. Plasencio – bass guitar (1–7, 9–11), upright bass (8)
- Phil Madeira – Hammond B3 organ (2, 4, 9)
- John Mark Painter – Mellotron (2), bells (3), accordion (4), oud (7), hurdy-gurdy (8, 11), muted trumpet (8)
- Tom Howard – acoustic piano (8)
- Al Perkins – pedal steel guitar (5, 8)
- Chris Donohue – bass (12)
- Justin Cary – bass (13)
- Mark Nash – cymbals (11), hi-hat (11)
- Kristin Wilkinson – viola (2, 3, 6, 11, 12)
- Peter Hyrka – violin (1, 10)
- Antoine Silverman – first violin (2, 3, 6, 11, 12), violin (5)
- David Davidson – second violin (2, 3, 6, 11, 12)

Production

- Steve Taylor – producer
- Russ Long – engineer, mixing (1–10, 12)
- Ryan Freeland – second engineer
- Chris Grainger – second engineer
- Tara Wilson – second engineer
- Andreas Krause – additional engineer
- John Mark Painter – additional engineer
- Tony Palacios – additional engineer
- Bob Clearmountain – mixing (11)
- Tom Lord-Alge – mixing (13)
- Nathaniel Tarn – editing
- Bob Ludwig – mastering
- W.S. Merwin – translation
- Gina R. Binkley – design direction
- Beth Lee – art direction
- Janice Booker – design
- D.L. Taylor – cover and back paintings
- Ben Pearson – original photography
- Randee St. Nicholas – band photography
- Toni Armani – stylist

Studios

- Recorded at The White House and The Carport (Nashville, Tennessee); Chelsea Recording Studios (Brentwood, Tennessee).
- Mixed at The Carport; Mix This! (Los Angeles, California); South Beach Studios (Miami Beach, Florida).
- Mastered at Gateway Mastering (Portland, Maine).

== Charts ==
=== Weekly ===
Weekly chart performance for Sixpence None the Richer
| Chart (1997–1999) | Peak position |
|---|---|
| Australian Albums (ARIA) | 79 |
| Austrian Albums (Ö3 Austria) | 32 |
| German Albums (Offizielle Top 100) | 57 |
| Norwegian Albums (VG-lista) | 16 |
| New Zealand Albums (RMNZ) | 45 |
| Swiss Albums (Schweizer Hitparade) | 26 |
| UK Albums (Official Charts) | 27 |
| US Billboard 200 | 89 |
| US Top Christian Albums (Billboard) | 1 |

=== Year-end ===
Year-end chart performance for Sixpence None the Richer
| Chart (2025) | Position |
|---|---|
| US Top Christian Albums (Billboard) | 18 |
