= Kiss Me (Sixpence None the Richer song) =

1998 single by Sixpence None the Richer

- 1999 US CD re-release

Single by Sixpence None the Richer

from the album Sixpence None the Richer
- B-side: "Sad but True"; "Love"; "I Can't Catch You"
- Released: July 14, 1998
- Studio: The White House (Nashville, Tennessee)
- Genre: Pop; alternative rock
- Length: 3:30 (album version); 3:19 (radio version)
- Label: Squint; Columbia; Elektra
- Songwriter: Matt Slocum
- Producer: Steve Taylor

Sixpence None the Richer singles chronology
"Angeltread" (1995)	"Kiss Me" (1998)	"There She Goes" (1999)

Music videos
- "Kiss Me" on YouTube; "Kiss Me" (alternative version) on YouTube; "Kiss Me" (She's All That version) on YouTube

"Kiss Me" is a song written by Matt Slocum and performed by American Christian alternative rock band Sixpence None the Richer. The ballad served as the lead single from their self-titled third album (1997). "Kiss Me" was serviced to US modern rock radio on July 14, 1998, and was issued physically on August 12. Several critics compared the song to works by English alternative rock band the Sundays, and it was nominated for a Best Pop Performance by a Duo or Group with Vocals at the 42nd Grammy Awards.

"Kiss Me" is the band's highest-charting single in the US, peaking at No. 2 on the Billboard Hot 100 and becoming the country's sixth-best-selling single of 1999. Worldwide, the song reached No. 1 on the Australian and Canadian charts as well as No. 4 on the UK Singles Chart, entering the top 10 in 16 countries altogether. Three music videos were made, directed by Steve Taylor and Randee St. Nicholas, with one paying tribute to French romantic drama film Jules and Jim and two featuring the band in a park watching a portable television.

== Background ==
"Kiss Me" originated as a draft of a song written in a Dutch motel. Sixpence None the Richer's lead vocalist Leigh Nash said the band had been in their rooms for about an hour when member Matt Slocum called to tell her he had written a new song. Nash added, "We were on tour over there, and we had a show that night at Flevo Festival. We performed it that night! I went down into his room and learned it. It was an instant hit with fans, but it was still like a year and a half before we recorded it."

The song has a more lighthearted, "poppier" sound than the band's earlier work; the band was reluctant to include it on their self-titled third album until their producer persuaded them to reconsider. Nash said early drafts of the song had "slightly edgier lyrics, with 'silver moon sparkling' originally written as 'cigarettes sparkling.'"

== Composition ==
The song is in E♭ major, with a "moderate beat" of 96 bpm. The time signature is 4/4 common time, and the vocal range is B♭_{3}–B♭_{4}, according to Musicnotes.com.

== Release ==
In January 1999, Miramax used "Kiss Me" as the theme song of its teen romantic comedy film She's All That. The film's box office success helped "Kiss Me" gain widespread mainstream attention and chart success. In Italy, the film was retitled Kiss Me. The song was also included on Dawson's Creek's first soundtrack in April 1999.

== Critical reception ==
Rick Anderson of AllMusic called the song "an utterly irresistible slice of swoony guitar pop", adding that "is impossible to shake loose from the brain and could well turn out to be this generation's 'I Wanna Hold Your Hand'." Chuck Taylor and Deborah Evans Price of Billboard magazine compared the song to those recorded by the Sundays. Taylor called it "admirably well-written" and "brightly produced", further comparing the track to 10,000 Maniacs. British music columnist James Masterton also compared "Kiss Me" to the Sundays, calling it a cross with a mellow Cranberries song and a "wonderful tapestry of jangling guitars". Jim Kerr of Radio & Records magazine called the song an "amazing piece of alterna-pop" reminiscent of the Sundays. Larry Flick of Billboard described "Kiss Me" as a "refreshing summertime tune" with "airy" production and "romantic" imagery. Daily Record called it an "excellent pop song."

== Chart performance ==
"Kiss Me" debuted on the US Billboard Hot 100 at number 90 on the issue of November 28, 1998, but it fell out of the top 100 the next week. On February 13, 1999, it reentered the listing at number 91, then took another 11 weeks to reach its peak of number two on May 1, where it stayed for one week. It stayed in the top 100 for 33 weeks, ending 1999 as the United States' sixth-most-successful song of the year. The single additionally peaked atop the Billboard Mainstream Top 40 chart and reached number two on the Adult Contemporary and Adult Top 40 charts. In Canada, "Kiss Me" debuted at number 45 on the RPM 100 Hit Tracks chart on March 22 and rose to number one on May 10, becoming Canada's 11th-best-performing hit of 1999. It topped the RPM Adult Contemporary chart as well.

The track reached number one in Australia, where it stayed for three weeks in June 1999 following a four-week climb up the ARIA Singles Chart. It appeared at number 19 on the Australian year-end chart of 1999. In New Zealand, "Kiss Me" debuted at number 16 in May and rose to its peak of number four on July 18, spending 15 weeks in the top 50 and ending the year at number 44 on the RIANZ year-end chart. The song became a hit in several European countries, reaching the top 10 in Austria, Flanders, Germany, Greece, Hungary, Ireland, Italy, Norway, Switzerland, and the United Kingdom. It peaked within the top 20 in Iceland, the Netherlands, Sweden, and Wallonia, attaining a peak of number 15 on the Eurochart Hot 100. In France, it rose to number 32 in September 1999. "Kiss Me" has earned several certifications, receiving a quadruple-platinum award in New Zealand, a triple-platinum award in the UK and US, a platinum disc in Australia and Denmark, and gold discs in Belgium, Italy, and Japan.

== Music videos ==
The original video, directed by producer Steve Taylor and filmed in Paris, pays tribute to François Truffaut's film Jules and Jim, made in black and white and recreating many of the classic scenes from the film. Two alternate versions of the video were released later, directed by Randee St. Nicholas, that feature the band sitting on a park bench, performing and watching scenes from either She's All That or Dawson's Creek on a portable television or projected on an outdoor screen. Freddie Prinze Jr. and Rachael Leigh Cook appear in the She's All That version. The Dawson's Creek version was VH1's number-one video of May 1999.

== Legacy ==
=== Covers and samples ===
As a solo artist, Nash recorded a cover of the song for her 2018 Limited Edition EP and sings it as part of her live sets. The song has been covered by Avril Lavigne, UK R&B singer Nathan, Lava Lava on their album Tour Demo, and New Found Glory on their 2007 album From the Screen to Your Stereo Part II. The New Found Glory version has been released as a single with a video. Olivia Ong covered the song on her 2006 album A Girl Meets Bossa Nova 2. A cover by Debbie Scott appeared in the 2004 game Pump It Up: Exceed. Another cover was put in the 2003 game Karaoke Revolution.

The song was covered on the eighth season of The X Factor UK in 2011 by Janet Devlin in Week 7. In 2019, SZA performed a cover version as part of her set at the III Points Festival. In August 2021, Cyn recorded a cover version for the soundtrack to the Netflix film He's All That. In the season 1 episode of the TV series Ghosts, "Attic Girl" (2022), Sam Arondekar (Rose McIver) and Jay Arondekar (Utkarsh Ambudkar) throw a prom for the ghosts. The episode ends with Sam walking down the stairs in an homage to She's All That, a reference Jay mentions. The song was also covered by Ruel on June 27, 2024, on his EP Adaptations, which also features covers of other songs.

Lisa of the K-pop girl group Blackpink interpolated the song's chorus in her single "Moonlit Floor (Kiss Me)" on her 2024 album Alter Ego, transforming the alternative rock ballad into a more upbeat nu-disco dance-pop track.

=== In popular culture ===
In 2006, the song garnered renewed popularity in the Philippines because of a viral performance from actress and former Viva Hot Babes member Alyssa Alano. The viral video, which was uploaded on YouTube, featured a mondegreened version of the performance, with karaoke subtitles of her accented lyrics, which — among other things — rendered the title as "Keys Me".

In the 2003 romantic comedy How to Lose a Guy in 10 Days starring Kate Hudson and Matthew McConaughey, "Kiss Me" plays during a kiss-cam scene when their characters Andie Anderson and Benjamin Barry attend a New York Knicks game at Madison Square Garden. The song appears in the movie's soundtrack album.

Taylor Swift said that "Kiss Me" was the first song she learned to play on guitar, when she was 12 years old. The NHL used the song in a Stanley Cup Playoffs commercial in 2023.

== Track listings ==
- US Christian retail single
1. "Kiss Me" (radio remix) – 3:21
2. "Kiss Me" (album edit) – 3:02
3. "Sad but True" – 3:59
4. "Kiss Me" (live in Hollywood 2.12.98) – 3:29
- US cassette single
1. "Kiss Me"
2. "Love"
- UK CD single
1. "Kiss Me" (radio remix) – 3:18
2. "Sad but True" – 3:57
3. "Kiss Me" (live in Hollywood 2.12.98) – 3:28
- UK cassette single
1. "Kiss Me" (radio remix) – 3:18
2. "Sad but True" – 3:57
- Japanese CD single
1. "Kiss Me" (Japanese version) – 3:17
2. "Kiss Me" (LP version) – 3:27
3. "Kiss Me" (acoustic version) – 3:16
4. "I Can't Catch You" (Ben Grosse Remix) – 3:36
5. "Love" (Ben Grosse Remix) – 3:53
6. "Kiss Me" (instrumental edit) – 3:18

== Credits and personnel ==
Credits are lifted from the Sixpence None the Richer album booklet.

Studios

- Recorded at The White House (Nashville, Tennessee)
- Additional recording and mix at The Carport (Nashville, Tennessee)
- Mastered at Gateway Mastering (Portland, Maine)

Personnel

- Matt Slocum – words, music, guitar, cello
- Leigh Nash – vocals
- Dale Baker – drums, percussion
- J.J. Plasencio – bass
- John Mark Painter – accordion, additional engineering
- Phil Madeira – B-3
- Steve Taylor – production
- Russ Long – mixing, engineering
- Andreas Krause – additional engineering
- Tony Palacios – additional engineering
- Chris Grainger – second engineering
- Bob Ludwig – mastering

== Charts ==
=== Weekly charts ===
Chart (1998–1999)	Peak position
Australia (ARIA)	1
Austria (Ö3 Austria Top 40)	7
Belgium (Ultratop 50 Flanders)	7
Belgium (Ultratop 50 Wallonia)	12
Canada Top Singles (RPM)	1
Canada Adult Contemporary (RPM)	1
Czech Republic (IFPI)	10
Europe (Eurochart Hot 100)	15
France (SNEP)	32
Germany (GfK)	7
Greece (IFPI Greece)	7
Hungary (Mahasz)	4
Iceland (Íslenski Listinn Topp 40)	17
Ireland (IRMA)	6
Italy (Musica e dischi)	7
Netherlands (Dutch Top 40)	12
Netherlands (Single Top 100)	27
New Zealand (Recorded Music NZ)	4
Norway (VG-lista)	8
Poland Airplay (Music & Media)	4
Scottish Singles Sales (Official Charts)	2
Sweden (Sverigetopplistan)	13
Switzerland (Schweizer Hitparade)	6
UK Singles (Official Charts)	4
US Billboard Hot 100	2
US Adult Alternative Airplay (Billboard)	17
US Adult Contemporary (Billboard)	2
US Adult Pop Airplay (Billboard)	2
US Pop Airplay (Billboard)	1

Chart (2016)	Peak position
Poland Airplay (ZPAV)	75

Chart (2026)	Peak position
Global 200 (Billboard)	172

=== Year-end charts ===
Chart (1999)	Position
Australia (ARIA)	19
Belgium (Ultratop 50 Flanders)	47
Belgium (Ultratop 50 Wallonia)	61
Brazil (Crowley)	74
Canada Top Singles (RPM)	11
Canada Adult Contemporary (RPM)	6
Europe (Eurochart Hot 100)	56
Germany (Media Control)	53
Netherlands (Dutch Top 40)	75
New Zealand (RIANZ)	44
Sweden (Hitlistan)	89
Switzerland (Schweizer Hitparade)	42
UK Singles (OCC)	63
UK Airplay (Music Week)	2
US Billboard Hot 100	6
US Adult Contemporary (Billboard)	7
US Adult Top 40 (Billboard)	2
US Mainstream Top 40 (Billboard)	8

Chart (2000)	Position
US Adult Contemporary (Billboard)	26

Chart (2025)	Position
Estonia Airplay (TopHit)	195

== Certifications ==
Region	Certification	Certified units/sales
Australia (ARIA)	Platinum	70,000^{^}
Belgium (BRMA)	Gold	25,000^{*}
Denmark (IFPI Danmark)	Platinum	90,000^{‡}
Italy (FIMI) sales since 2009	Gold	35,000^{‡}
Japan (RIAJ) digital 2005 release	Gold	100,000^{*}
New Zealand (RMNZ)	4× Platinum	120,000^{‡}
United Kingdom (BPI)	3× Platinum	1,800,000^{‡}
United States (RIAA)	3× Platinum	3,000,000^{‡}
^{*} Sales figures based on certification alone.^{^} Shipments figures based on certification alone.^{‡} Sales+streaming figures based on certification alone.

== Release history ==
Region	Date	Format(s)	Label(s)	Ref.
United States	July 14, 1998	Modern rock radio	Columbia; Squint	
United States	August 1998	Modern AC radio	Columbia; Squint	
United States	August 12, 1998	CD; cassette	Columbia; Squint	
United States	December 8, 1998	Top 40 radio	Columbia; Squint	
Germany	May 17, 1999	CD	Elektra; Squint	
United Kingdom	May 17, 1999	CD; cassette	Elektra; Squint	
Japan	February 9, 2000	CD	EastWest Japan; Squint	
Various	February 13, 2026	7-inch vinyl	Flatiron	
