= Breathe Your Name =

Single by Sixpence None the Richer

from the album Divine Discontent
- Released: October 1, 2002
- Recorded: 2002
- Genre: Alternative rock
- Length: 3:59
- Label: Reprise; Squint
- Songwriter: Matt Slocum
- Producers: Matt Slocum; Paul Fox

Sixpence None the Richer singles chronology
| "I Can't Catch You" (2000) | "Breathe Your Name" (2002) | "Don't Dream It's Over" (2003) |

Music video
- "Breathe Your Name" on YouTube

"Breathe Your Name" is a song by the American pop rock band Sixpence None the Richer. It was released in 2002 on Reprise Records and Squint Entertainment as the debut radio single and as well as the opening track from their fourth studio album, Divine Discontent (2002). It is a pop song that was produced by Paul Fox and Matt Slocum and written by the latter.

== In popular culture ==
- In February 2003, the song was featured in season 7, episode 16 of Sabrina the Teenage Witch where the band makes a guest appearance and performs the song live.
- In September 2021, the song was featured in season 3, episode 7 of the Netflix Series Sex Education.

== Track listing ==
US CD single
| No. | Title | Length |
|---|---|---|
| 1. | "Breathe Your Name" (single version) | 3:59 |
| 2. | "Northern Lights" | 4:05 |

US promo CD single
| No. | Title | Length |
|---|---|---|
| 1. | "Breathe Your Name" (album version) | 3:58 |

US 7" single A-side
| No. | Title | Length |
|---|---|---|
| 1. | "Breathe Your Name" (single mix) | 3:58 |

B-side
| No. | Title | Length |
|---|---|---|
| 1. | "Waiting on the Sun" (album version) | 2:55 |

== Charts ==
| Chart (2002) | Peak position |
|---|---|
| US Adult Pop Airplay (Billboard) | 18 |
