= Freedom Souls =

Studio album by Burlap to Cashmere
- Released: June 23, 2015
- Genres: Contemporary Christian music, indie rock, worldbeat
- Length: 40:10
- Label: B2C

Burlap to Cashmere chronology
| From the Vault (2013) | Freedom Souls (2015) |

Freedom Souls is the fourth studio album from Burlap to Cashmere. B2C Recordings released the project on June 23, 2015.

== Critical reception ==
Professional ratings
Review scores
| Source | Rating |
|---|---|
| CCM Magazine | 4/5 stars |
| Jesus Freak Hideout | 4.5/5 stars |
| The Phantom Tollbooth | 4/5; 4/5 |

Awarding the album four stars from CCM Magazine, Andy Argyrakis states, "Past-recording history may have been spotty, but Burlap to Cashmere is officially back with Freedom Souls". Bert Saraco, giving the album a four out of five at The Phantom Tollbooth, writes, "Freedom Souls brings a slightly more diverse palette to Burlap to Cashmere, with a richer blend of keyboard and some atmospheric journeys that incorporate some jazzier elements into their already-fascinating mix of classic rock, pop, and Mediterranean sounds." Rating the album four out of five for The Phantom Tollbooth, Derek Walker says, "the sound remains fresh and unpredictable". Alex Caldwell, awarding the album four and a half stars for Jesus Freak Hideout, describes, "Freedom Souls is an excellent record, full of both bold, eclectic music (filling a particular need in a Christian Music scene filled with so many sound-alike artists) and a strong, story-like theme of wandering and redemption."

== Track listing ==
| No. | Title | Length |
|---|---|---|
| 1. | "I Will Follow" | 2:52 |
| 2. | "The Great I Am" | 4:08 |
| 3. | "Freedom Souls" | 4:21 |
| 4. | "Tonilou" | 4:12 |
| 5. | "16 Miles" | 3:15 |
| 6. | "Passover" | 3:46 |
| 7. | "Agape Mou" | 3:54 |
| 8. | "Brain Fog" | 2:48 |
| 9. | "River in My Head" | 3:49 |
| 10. | "Dialing God" | 3:42 |
| 11. | "Dialing God (Instrumental)" | 3:23 |
| Total length: | | 40:10 |
