= Superfast Rock n' Roll Played Slow =

Studio album by Tess Wiley
- Released: April 27, 2007
- Recorded: 2006
- Genre: Rock
- Length: 47:11
- Label: Tapete Records

Tess Wiley chronology
Not Quite Me (2004)	Superfast Rock n' Roll Played Slow (2007)	Little Secrets (2013)

Professional ratings
Review scores
Source	Rating
Cross Rhythms	9/10 stars

Superfast Rock n' Roll Played Slow is the third studio album by American singer/songwriter Tess Wiley, released on April 27, 2007.

== Track listing ==
1. "Halfway Through"
2. "Raise Your Hand"
3. "Crying for You"
4. "Idle"
5. "Messed Up Everywhere Blues"
6. "All for You"
7. "Tenderness and love"
8. "Slow"
9. "Some Old Way Out"
10. "What it comes down to"
11. "Anette"

All songs by Tess Wiley, except "Messed Up Everywhere Blues" by Jason Harrod.

== Personnel ==
- Tess Wiley - guitar, vocals
