= Not Quite Me =

Studio album by Tess Wiley
- Released: January 1, 2004
- Genre: Rock
- Length: 41:38
- Label: Tapete Records

Tess Wiley chronology
| Rainy Day Assembly (2001) | Not Quite Me (2004) | Superfast Rock n' Roll Played Slow (2007) |

Professional ratings
Review scores
| Source | Rating |
|---|---|
| AllMusic | 3.5/5 stars |

Not Quite Me is the second studio album by American singer/songwriter Tess Wiley, released in 2004.

== Track listing ==
All songs by Tess Wiley, except where noted

1. "Not Quite Me" – 3:52
2. "How Does Silence Feel" – 3:28
3. "Let It Come" – 4:00
4. "Nature of the World" – 4:23
5. "Revelry" – 4:37
6. "Delicate Skin" – 4:04
7. "My Fortress and My Shield" – 4:37
8. "Falling In and Out" – 4:25
9. "Happy Now" – 5:00
10. "This Shadow" – 3:22

== Personnel ==
- Tess Wiley - vocals, guitar
- Miriam - background vocals
- Christian - drums
