= Divine Discontent =

2002 studio album by Sixpence None the Richer

Studio album by Sixpence None the Richer
- Released: October 29, 2002
- Recorded: 1999–2002
- Genres: Pop rock, Christian rock
- Length: 55:11
- Labels: Reprise, Squint
- Producers: Rob Cavallo; Paul Fox; Ron Aniello

Sixpence None the Richer chronology
Sixpence None the Richer (1997)	Divine Discontent (2002)	The Best of Sixpence None the Richer (2004)

Singles from Divine Discontent
- 1. "Breathe Your Name" Released: 2002; 2. "Don't Dream It's Over" Released: January 21, 2003

Divine Discontent is the fourth studio album by Sixpence None the Richer. The album was released on October 29, 2002.

== Background ==
Lead singer Leigh Nash has described her understanding of the album title as being that "sometimes your pain and the bad things you go through in life can be good if they bring you to a better place, a stronger place in your life," that is, "discontent can be divine." The album's completion and release was delayed due to a protracted struggle with their prior record label which Nash has described as being a low point for her, but that the process had made her emotionally stronger. In press notes, lead songwriter Matt Slocum said that there is "spiritual content" in many of his songs which come from "trying to be honest about the issues of life," while adding that "it also comes more in the form of asking questions than giving answers."

The cover of Crowded House's "Don't Dream It's Over" was one of the later songs to be selected for the album (along with "A Million Parachutes" and "Waiting on the Sun") as it was a request by the label. However, the band was an admirer of Neil Finn and so did not mind.

Nash and Slocum parted ways in early 2004 before reuniting to record the My Dear Machine EP in 2008.

== Critical reception ==
Professional ratings
Review scores
Source	Rating
AllMusic	4.5/5 stars
The Austin Chronicle	3.5/5 stars
Blender	3/5 stars
Cross Rhythms	10/10 squares
Rolling Stone	2/5 stars
USA Today	3/4 stars

Nikki Tranter of PopMatters praised Divine Discontent as "an expertly written, musically tight, effortlessly executed ride, proving that, as musical partners, Nash and Slocum are a force to be reckoned with."

In 2003, the song "Breathe Your Name" won the GMA Dove Award for Modern Rock/Alternative Recorded Song of the Year.

== Track listing ==
No.	Title	Writer(s)	Length
1.	"Breathe Your Name"	Matt Slocum	3:56
2.	"Tonight"	Slocum	3:52
3.	"Down and Out of Time"	Leigh Nash; Slocum	3:28
4.	"Don't Dream It's Over"	Neil Finn	4:03
5.	"Waiting on the Sun"	Aniello; Jason Wade	2:54
6.	"Still Burning"	Kelly; Slocum	4:02
7.	"Melody of You"	Slocum	4:50
8.	"Paralyzed"	Slocum	3:54
9.	"I've Been Waiting"	Slocum	4:19
10.	"Eyes Wide Open"	Nash	3:28
11.	"Dizzy"	Slocum	6:36
12.	"Tension Is a Passing Note"	Slocum	3:30
13.	"A Million Parachutes"	Ashworth; Slocum	6:19
Total length:			55:11

== Personnel ==
Sixpence None the Richer

- Leigh Nash – vocals
- Matt Slocum – acoustic guitar, cello, electric guitar, keyboard, vibraphone, e-bow
- Justin Cary – bass guitar
- Sean Kelly – acoustic guitar, electric guitar, hi-string guitar
- Dale Baker – percussion, drums
- Jerry Dale McFadden – piano, Hammond organ, mellotron
- Rob Mitchell – drums, percussion

Additional personnel

- Bob Becker – viola
- Denyse Buffum – viola
- Monisa Phillips Angel – viola
- Evan Wilson – viola
- Bruce Dukov – concert master, violin
- Suzie Katayama – cello
- Anthony LaMarchina – cello
- Carl Rabinowitz – cello
- John Catchings – cello
- Larry Corbett – cello
- Dan Smith – cello
- Rudy Stein – cello
- Mario de Leon – violin
- Peter Kent – violin
- David Davidson – violin
- Pamela Sixfin – violin
- Bob Peterson – violin
- Jacob Lawson – violin
- Rachel Purkin – violin
- Brian Leonard – violin
- Joel Derouin – violin
- Eve Butler – violin
- John Wittenberg – violin
- Jamie Muhoberac – keyboards
- Van Dyke Parks – leader
- Tim Pierce – guitar
- Rick Todd – french horn
- Kris Wilkinson – leader, viola

Production

- Paul Fox – producer (1–3, 5–13)
- Matt Slocum – producer (1–3, 5–13)
- Rob Cavallo – producer (4)
- Marc Chevalier – recording (1–3, 5–13), string recording (7, 12)
- Jeff Tomei – Pro Tools editing (1–3, 5–13), recording (2, 3, 5, 13), string recording (6, 11)
- Allen Sides – recording (4)
- Jenny Knotts – additional recording (1–3, 5–13), recording assistant (1–3, 5–13)
- Eric Bickle – recording assistant (2, 3, 5, 13)
- Greg Fogie – recording assistant (2, 3, 5, 13)
- Brian Vibberts – recording assistant (4)
- Bill Appleberry – Pro Tools editing (1–3, 5–13)
- Luke Wooten – Pro Tools editing (1–3, 5–13)
- Doug McKean – Pro Tools engineer (4)
- Louie Teran – digital editing (1–3, 5–13)
- Stewart Whitmore – digital editing (1–3, 5–13)
- Tom Lord-Alge – mixing
- Femio Hernández – mix assistant
- Stephen Marcussen – mastering (1–3, 5–13)
- Robert Vosgien – mastering (4)
- Cheryl Jenets – production coordinator (4)
- Paul McMenamin – art direction
- Darren Waterston – paintings
- Matthew Welch – photography

== Charts ==
Album - Billboard (United States)

Year	Chart	Position
2002	US Billboard 200	154
2002	US Christian Albums (Billboard)	9

Singles - Billboard (United States)

Year	Single	Chart	Position
2002	"Breathe Your Name"	US Adult Top 40 (Billboard)	18
2003	"Don't Dream It's Over"	US Adult Contemporary (Billboard)	12
2003	"Don't Dream It's Over"	US Adult Top 40 (Billboard)	9
2003	"Don't Dream It's Over"	US Billboard Hot 100	78
