= Rainy Day Assembly =

Studio album by Tess Wiley
- Released: September 28, 2001
- Recorded: June 1999 – January 2001
- Genre: Rock
- Length: 44:28
- Label: Effanel Music
- Producer: Paul Bryan

Tess Wiley chronology
Rainy Day Assembly (2001)	Not Quite Me (2004)

Professional ratings
Review scores
Source	Rating
AllMusic	(favorable)
Cross Rhythms	9/10 stars
PopMatters	(favorable)

Rainy Day Assembly is the debut album by American singer/songwriter Tess Wiley, released in 2001.

== Track listing ==
All tracks are written by Tess Wiley.

No.	Title	Length
1.	"Small Things Define"	4:21
2.	"Rainy Day Assembly"	3:06
3.	"Nice And Warm"	3:45
4.	"Breathe"	5:49
5.	"Something Sweet and Real"	4:06
6.	"The Energy You Keep"	4:27
7.	"Skinny Little Line"	3:40
8.	"Favorite One"	5:50
9.	"Untitled"	5:56
10.	"Out of my Head"	4:19
Total length:		44:28

== Personnel ==
- Tess Wiley – guitar, vocals
- Gerry Leonard – guitar, banjo
- Paul Bryan – piano, keyboards, vibraphone, bass, background vocals
- Jay Bellerose – drums, percussion
- Shawn Pelton – drums
- Paul Bryan – producer
