= Tess Wiley =

American singer-songwriter (born 1974)

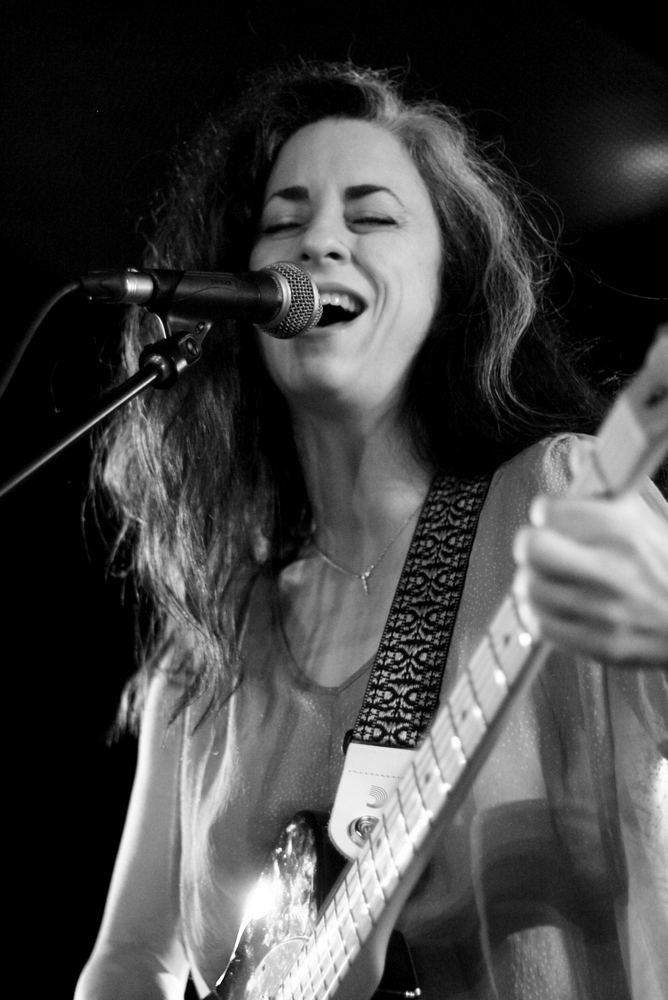
- Wiley performing in 2015

Background information
- Born: Tess Wiley; November 5, 1974 (age 51); Dallas, Texas, U.S.
- Genres: Pop rock, soft rock, alternative rock
- Occupations: Singer-songwriter, musician
- Instruments: Guitar, vocals
- Years active: 1991–present
- Labels: Tapete, Nordpol
- Formerly of: Sixpence None the Richer, Velour 100
- Website: www.tesswiley.com

Tess Wiley (born November 5, 1974) is an American singer-songwriter.

== Early life ==
Tess Wiley was born in Dallas, Texas in 1974 to a Christian family. Her mother, Kathryn Wiley, was a poet while her father, Fletch Wiley, was a musician, one of The Disciples. Tess's childhood was rather peripatetic: she travelled frequently from Houston to Seattle to San Francisco then back to Houston. She showed an interest in music and songwriting from an early age, adding "Create in Me a Clean Heart" and "Tender Shepherd" to her repertoire at the age of two. She began to play the piano at the age of five, then the violin at 12, and the guitar at 14. She wanted to make her musical style along the lines of hard rock guitarist Slash, but riffing soon gave way to contemplative songwriting. She spent her high school years singing in the band Nothing in Return while studying classical piano at the High School for the Performing and Visual Arts in Houston, Texas where she sang along with Mariah Carey and Whitney Houston.

== Career ==
=== Sixpence None the Richer ===
In 1995, Wiley joined the band Sixpence None the Richer on their European and American tours and wrote a mini-album Tickets For A Prayer Wheel as well as "Disconnect" for their second record, This Beautiful Mess. Wiley left the band shortly after the American tour in 1996. When Sixpence reunited in 2007, Wiley performed with the band on their 2008 European tour.

=== Solo career ===
After her departure from Sixpence, she began recording under the name "Splendora" but had to abandon it due to a copyright violation with the New York City group of the same name. She adopted "Phantasmic" name for her group when she was dating Chris Colbert, who was a singer in Fluffy. Together, they agreed to change the name of the band to Xtra Fluffy and compiled a few songs along with Zachary Gresham of Southern Hymns. Eventually, she formed her own band, called Tess Wiley and Her Orchestra.

She also lent her vocals to Velour 100 on the album Of Color Bright in 1997 and the following year recorded a covers album, I Light Up Your Life. In 2001 Wiley released her first album, Rainy Day Assembly.

In 2003, Wiley relocated to Giessen, Germany where she formed a band with Tim Potzas, Christian Weiss and Christian Pfaff. In 2004 her solo album Not Quite Me was released by Tapete Records. In 2007, Tapete released Superfast Rock n' Roll Played Slow. In 2010 Tess formed a duo band along with Elo von Knorre, whom she met at church. During those times, she also wrote a German song, "Licht Leuchte Auf" and translated "My Fortress And My Shield", an inspiration of Psalm 42 from her Not Quite Me record.

In 2013, her album Little Secrets was released by Nordpol.

== Personal life ==
Wiley was married to Christian Roth, a photo-journalist. Her brother, Gabriel Wiley, is the drummer in the emo band Mineral.

== Discography ==
- Rainy Day Assembly (Effanel, 2001)
- Not Quite Me (Tapete, 2004)
- Superfast Rock n' Roll Played Slow (Tapete, 2007)
- Little Secrets (Nordpol, 2013)
- Femme Sole (What we call Records, 2018)

== Sidewoman ==
With Steev Richter

- Beloved (Steev Richter, 2016)

With Velour 100

- Of Color Bright (Tooth and Nail, 1997)
