= Blue on Blue (book) =

2017 book by Charles Campisi and Gordon Dillow

Blue on Blue: An Insider's Story of Good Cops Catching Bad Cops
- Author: Charles Campisi, Gordon Dillow
- Language: English
- Genre: Nonfiction
- Publisher: Scribner
- Publication date: February 2017
- ISBN: 978-1-5011-2719-9

Blue on Blue: An Insider's Story of Good Cops Catching Bad Cops is a 2017 nonfiction book by Charles Campisi and journalist Gordon Dillow.

Campisi, the primary author of Blue on Blue, was the head of the New York Police Department Internal Affairs Bureau. With Dillow, he describes his police career, and various cases of the Bureau investigating police officers who stole drugs, employed excessive force, or otherwise violated laws or regulations. The Abner Louima case and the shooting of Amadou Diallo are covered, and the "blue wall of silence" phenomena is discussed.

Campisi and Dillow also describe the activities of the Police Impersonation Group, the Bureau's section devoted to catching people impersonating New York City police officers. The authors outline how miscreants obtain fake copies of police badges and even full uniforms and use them against unwitting victims, and sometimes whole communities (typically vulnerable immigrant communities), for crimes including rape and extortion.

The book ends with a commentary on the current state of the New York City police, where the authors express concern that the Department is vulnerable to infiltration by sympathizers or even sleeper agents of terrorist organizations such as ISIS or al-Qaeda.

The book was reviewed by The Wall Street Journal, who wrote "Mr. Campisi... tells his cop stories with verve, intriguing detail and a generous heart", and it received generally favorable reviews in some other notable websites and publications.
