= The Dawn of Grace =

Studio album by Sixpence None the Richer
- Released: October 14, 2008
- Recorded: 2008
- Studio: Las Vegas, Nevada
- Genres: Alternative rock; Christian rock; indie pop; Christmas
- Length: 34:24
- Label: Nettwerk
- Producer: Steve Hindalong

Sixpence None the Richer chronology
Divine Discontent (2002)	The Dawn of Grace (2008)	Lost in Transition (2012)

Professional ratings
Review scores
Source	Rating
AllMusic	7/10 stars
Cross Rhythms	8/10 squares
Jesus Freak Hideout	3/5 stars

The Dawn of Grace is the fifth studio album and first Christmas album by Sixpence None the Richer. The album was released on October 14, 2008.

== Background ==
The Dawn of Grace was produced by Steve Hindalong and consists of eight traditional Christmas songs, including "Angels We Have Heard on High" and "Silent Night", featuring guest vocalist Dan Haseltine of Jars of Clay, and two original Sixpence Christmas tunes called "The Last Christmas Without You" and "Christmas for Two". The subtitle on the cover reads: A Collection of Original and Traditional Christmas Songs. Although one single were released from the album, two animated music videos were released for "Angels We Have Heard on High" and "Silent Night". The album reached No. 47 on the U.S. Christian Album Chart. After spending three years apart, the band reunited for this album.

Deluxe version was released in November 15, 2024, with the songs remastered and two new songs.

== Track listing ==
No.	Title	Writer(s)	Length
1.	"Angels We Have Heard on High"		4:15
2.	"The Last Christmas Without You"	Matt Slocum, Steve Hindalong	3:12
3.	"O Come, O Come, Emmanuel"		3:06
4.	"Silent Night" (featuring Dan Haseltine)		4:28
5.	"Riu Riu Chiu"		3:06
6.	"Carol of the Bells"		2:24
7.	"Christmas Island"	Lyle Moraine	2:33
8.	"River"	Joni Mitchell	3:57
9.	"Christmas for Two"	Leigh Nash, Kate York	3:09
10.	"Some Children See Him"	Alfred Burt	4:14
Total length:			34:24

Deluxe version
No.	Title	Writer(s)	Length
1.	"I Believe in Father Christmas"		3:19
2.	"It Came Upon the Midnight Clear"		3:47
3.	"Angels We Have Heard on High (2024 Remaster)"		4:15
4.	"The Last Christmas Without You (2024 Remaster)"	Matt Slocum, Steve Hindalong	3:12
5.	"O Come, O Come, Emmanuel (2024 Remaster)"		3:06
6.	"Ríu Ríu Chíu (2024 Remaster)"		3:06
7.	"Silent Night (2024 Remaster)" (featuring Dan Haseltine)		4:28
8.	"Carol of the Bells (2024 Remaster)"		2:24
9.	"Christmas Island (2024 Remaster)"	Lyle Moraine	2:33
10.	"River (2024 Remaster)"	Joni Mitchell	3:57
11.	"Christmas for Two (2024 Remaster)"	Leigh Nash, Kate York	3:09
12.	"Some Children See Him (2024 Remaster)"	Alfred Burt	4:14
Total length:			41:30

== Credits ==
- Derri Daughterty – co–producer, engineer
- Jason Lehning – mixing
- Steve Hindalong – producer
- Leigh Nash – vocals
