= Fauxliage =

Studio album by Fauxliage
- Released: 14 August 2007
- Genre: Electronic, pop, ambient
- Label: Nettwerk
- Producer: Bill Leeb, Rhys Fulber

Professional ratings
Review scores
Source	Rating
Jesus Freak Hideout	4/5 stars
mxdwn	Unfavourable
PopMatters	6/10
Release	6/10

Fauxliage is a musical project consisting of Canadian electronic musicians Bill Leeb and Rhys Fulber, both of Delerium and Front Line Assembly, and Leigh Nash of Sixpence None the Richer in 2007. The vocals are performed exclusively by Nash.

Many of the songs from this album have been on the soundtrack of the television series Moonlight.

== Track listing ==
All tracks are written by Bill Leeb, Leigh Nash and Roy Salmond, except where noted

No.	Title	Length
1.	"All the World"	4:40
2.	"Someday the Wind"	4:11
3.	"Draw My Life"	4:03
4.	"Let it Go" (Written by Leigh Nash, Chris Elliot and Rhys Fulber)	4:45
5.	"Magic" (Written by Rhys Fulber)	3:38
6.	"Without You"	4:57
7.	"Rafe"	5:15
8.	"Vibing"	5:26
9.	"All Alone"	5:11
10.	"Rafe (Gabin Remix)"	4:10
11.	"Rafe (Pacha Remix)"	4:39

== Personnel ==
=== Musicians ===
- Leigh Nash – vocals, writing (1–4, 6–11)
- Bill Leeb – writing (1–3, 6–11), production
- Rhys Fulber – writing (4, 5), production
- Leah Randi – bass (1, 2, 4, 5, 7, 8), vocals (5)
- Roy Salmond – guitar (1–3, 6–9), keyboard (1–3, 6–9), writing (1–3, 6–11)
- Mike Hiratzka – programming (1)
- Ashwin Sood – drums (2, 3, 9)
- Emerson Swinford – guitar (2, 4, 5)
- Mark Jowett – guitar (3, 6), programming (3, 6)
- Andy Holt – programming (3, 6)
- Chris Elliot – arrangement (4), keyboard (4), writing (4)

=== Technical personnel ===
- Ted Jensen – mastering
- Greg Reely – mixing
