= Blue on Blue (Leigh Nash album) =

Studio album by Leigh Nash
- Released: August 15, 2006
- Recorded: 2005–2006
- Genre: Pop
- Length: 44:08
- Label: One Son
- Producer: Pierre Marchand

Leigh Nash chronology
Blue on Blue (2006)	Wishing for This (2006)

Singles from Blue on Blue
- 1. "My Idea of Heaven" Released: July 2006; 2. "Ocean Size Love" Released: 2007; 3. "Blue Sky" Released: May 2007

Blue on Blue is Leigh Nash's debut solo album and consists of pop songs. Nash began working on the album a year after Sixpence None the Richer disbanded. The album was produced by Pierre Marchand, who is best known for his collaborations with Sarah McLachlan.

"My Idea of Heaven" was released to US radio on the July 14, 2006. A video was also made to accompany the song.

== Critical and commercial response ==
Professional ratings
Review scores
Source	Rating
AllMusic	4/5 stars
E! Online	B−
Jesus Freak Hideout	3.5/5 stars
Slant Magazine	3/5 stars

The album met mixed to positive reviews upon release. Nash's vocals, lyrics and music direction were lauded. Blue on Blue was criticized mainly because of the songs not being as immediately appealing as the ones released by Sixpence None the Richer. Collaborators on this album are Sixpence bandmate Matt Slocum, and the songwriting/production team of Rick Nowels and Billy Steinberg.

Commercially, the album did not perform well. One of the main reasons for this is the fact that the album remains unknown among the masses due to the lack of promotion and airplay. So far, it managed to reach No. 25 in the Billboard Top Heatseekers charts; however, the bonus track "Blue Sky" reached No. 5 in Japanese pop music Chart due to its frequent airplay and the advertisement of "Toyota Prius" in Japan in 2007.

== Track listing ==
1. "Along the Wall" (Pierre Marchand, Leigh Nash) - 4:30
2. "Nervous in the Light of Dawn" (Rick Nowels, Billy Steinberg, Matt Slocum, Leigh Nash) - 4:40
3. "My Idea of Heaven" (Nowels, Steinberg, Leigh Nash) - 4:05
4. "Ocean Size Love" (Leigh Nash, Scott Cutler, Anne Preven) - 4:58
5. "Never Finish" (Ron Aniello, Leigh Nash) - 3:44
6. "Between the Lines" (Leigh Nash, Pierre Marchand) - 4:07
7. "More of It" (Greg Wells, Leigh Nash) - 3:09
8. "Angel Tonight" (Holly Knight, Leigh Nash) - 3:17
9. "Blue" (Jude Cole, Leigh Nash) - 3:32
10. "Cloud Nine" (Cutler, Preven, Leigh Nash) - 3:47
11. "Just a Little" (Leigh Nash, Danielle Brisebois, Wayne Rodrigues) - 4:01

iTunes edition bonus track

12. "Thank You" - 3:59

Japanese edition bonus tracks

12. "Run Together" (Rick Nowels, Billy Steinberg, Matt Slocum, Leigh Nash) - 4:13
13. "Blue Sky" (Rick Nowels, Billy Steinberg, Leigh Nash) - 4:09
14. "Blue Sky" (A cappella version) - 4:01
- "Along the Wall" can be heard at the Kyle XY episode "Hands on a Hybrid".
- "Blue Sky" is the theme to Toyota Prius in Japan.

== Chart performance ==
Chart (2006/2007)	Peak position
U.S. Top Heatseekers	25
U.S. Top Christian Albums	19
Japan Albums Chart	5
