= My Dear Machine =

EP by Sixpence None the Richer
- Released: July 8, 2008
- Genre: Alternative rock, indie pop
- Length: 15:08
- Label: Independent

Sixpence None the Richer albums chronology
The Best of Sixpence None the Richer (2004)	My Dear Machine (2008)	The Dawn of Grace (2008)

Sixpence None the Richer singles chronology
"'Don't Dream It's Over'" (2003)	"'My Dear Machine'" (2008)

Professional ratings
Review scores
Source	Rating
AbsolutePunk.net	85%
Jesus Freak Hideout	4/5 stars

My Dear Machine is an EP by Sixpence None the Richer, released on the music website NoiseTrade in July 8, 2008, although it was discontinued from the site in early 2009. It is the band's first official release in the four years since The Best of Sixpence None the Richer in 2004. "My Dear Machine", "Sooner Than Later", and "Amazing Grace (Give It Back)" would later appear on the band's 2012 album, Lost in Transition.

== Track listing ==
1. "My Dear Machine" – 2:45
2. "Amazing Grace (Give It Back)" – 4:01
3. "Sooner Than Later" – 3:56
4. "Around" – 4:26
