= This Beautiful Mess =

Studio album by Sixpence None the Richer
- Released: April 18, 1995
- Studio: Omni Sound (Nashville, Tennessee)
- Genres: Alternative rock, pop rock, Christian rock
- Length: 49:39
- Label: R.E.X.
- Producer: Armand John Petri

Sixpence None the Richer chronology
The Fatherless and the Widow (1994)	This Beautiful Mess (1995)	Sixpence None the Richer (1997)

This Beautiful Mess is the second studio album by American band Sixpence None the Richer, released in 1995 (see 1995 in music). The recording was produced by Armand John Petri, who also managed the band from 1993 to 1997. This Beautiful Mess surpassed 50,000 copies sold during its first year of release and laid the foundation for Sixpence's self-titled breakout album two years later. This Beautiful Mess won the 1996 Dove Award for "Alternative/Modern Rock Album of the Year." The songs "Within a Room Somewhere" and "I Can't Explain" were both minor hits on the Christian music charts.

Two bands named after this album exist. The first originated in Colorado Springs, Colorado in 1996 and went on to become OneRepublic. The second, formed in 1997, is the Dutch rock quintet from the Netherlands.

== Critical reception ==
Professional ratings
Review scores
Source	Rating
AllMusic	2.5/5 stars
Cross Rhythms	10/10 squares

At the time of the album's release, Sixpence None the Richer were stereotyped as both an indie band and a Christian band, which led to This Beautiful Mess receiving relatively little in the way of attention from the secular or "mainstream" music industries — the band's lead vocalist, Leigh Nash, stated during a 1999 interview, "we really knocked ourselves out for [This Beautiful Mess] and it didn’t really go anywhere." — although the attention it did receive was generally positive. The magazine Cross Rhythms highly praised it, saying "This, their second (proper) album, has been eagerly awaited and does not disappoint.", and AllMusic gave a moderately favorable review with particular praise going to the songs "Within a Room, Somewhere", calling it "one of the strongest songs of the album," and "Melting Alone," which "keenly expresses the pain of loneliness."

However, following the release of their eponymous album in 1997 and the explosion in popularity of the song "Kiss Me" in 1999, the band began to gather a much larger following outside of the Christian music industry. Accordingly, in the years since, This Beautiful Mess has also received more, mostly positive, attention. Alan Parish penned an opinion piece for the online blog Medium, in which he detailed the profound impact the album had on his life, writing, "It was the best complete album I had ever heard, and to this day I consider it my favorite album of all time. [...] The internal emotions and thoughts this album spurred in me gave me a confidence and self-worth I had never before experienced." Jesus Freak Hideout noted that the album was a step up from their previous work and that the addition of three new members since then made Sixpence None the Richer "a full band," and ultimately summarized the album as "a must for fans of 90s alternative rock, and jangle pop, and those digging deeper into the history of Contemporary Christian Music."

== Track listing ==
All tracks are written by Matt Slocum, except where noted.

CD
No.	Title	Writer(s)	Length
1.	"Angeltread"		3:28
2.	"Love, Salvation, the Fear of Death"	Slocum, James Arhelger	3:51
3.	"Bleeding"		5:04
4.	"Within a Room Somewhere"		5:06
5.	"Melting Alone"		4:03
6.	"Circle of Error"		5:04
7.	"The Garden"	Slocum, Arhelger, Dale Baker, Leigh Bingham	4:03
8.	"Disconnect"	Tess Wiley	4:20
9.	"Thought Menagerie"		3:11
10.	"Maybe Tomorrow"		4:22
11.	"Drifting"		3:42
12.	"I Can't Explain"		3:25
Total length:			49:39

== Personnel ==
- Leigh Nash – vocals
- Matt Slocum – guitars, cello
- Tess Wiley – guitars, vocals
- J.J. Plasencio – bass
- Dale Baker – drums

Production

- Armand John Petri – producer, engineer, mixing
- Bryan Lenox – basic track engineer, mixing
- Scott Lenox – assistant engineer
- Aaron Swihart – assistant engineer
- Tyler Bacon – executive producer
- Gavin Morkel – executive producer
- Duncan Stanbury – mastering
- Jeff Spencer – digital prepress, design assistant at Nosegrind Creative
- Kim Thomas – cover painting
- Chris Taylor – title
- Ben Pearson – photography
