= Don't Dream It's Over =

1986 single by Crowded House

- Original 1986 Australian single

Single by Crowded House

from the album Crowded House
- B-side: "That's What I Call Love"
- Released: 20 October 1986
- Studio: Capitol Recording, Sunset Sound Factory (Los Angeles)
- Genre: Soft rock; shoegaze; pop; blue-eyed soul
- Length: 3:55
- Label: Capitol
- Songwriter: Neil Finn
- Producer: Mitchell Froom

Crowded House singles chronology
"Now We're Getting Somewhere" (1986)	"Don't Dream It's Over" (1986)	"Something So Strong" (1987)

Music video
- "Don't Dream It's Over" on YouTube

"Don't Dream It's Over" is a song by Australian-New Zealand rock band Crowded House. Written and composed by frontman Neil Finn, it was released on 20 October 1986 as the fourth single from the band's self-titled debut studio album.

"Don't Dream It's Over" became the band's biggest international hit and signature song, reaching No. 2 on the US Billboard Hot 100 in April 1987. It has been certified 2x platinum in the United Kingdom and 9x platinum in Australia. In May 2001, the Australasian Performing Right Association (APRA) ranked "Don't Dream It's Over" second on its list of the Top 100 New Zealand songs of all time and seventh on its list of the Top 100 Australian songs of all time.

The song has been recorded by other artists, including Paul Young, Sixpence None the Richer, and New Zealand artist Stan Walker; Walker produced a Māori version entitled Moemoeā ("Dream"). Italian singer-songwriter Antonello Venditti performed an adaptation in Italian entitled "Alta marea" ("High Tide").

== Composition ==
"Don't Dream It's Over" was composed and written by Neil Finn, the frontman of Crowded House. It was composed in the key of E-flat major. AudioCulture writer Michael Brown points to the song as a mainstream use of a type of strum developed among Māori guitarists in the 1930s called the "jingajik" or "party strum". The song includes an organ solo.

Neil Finn has said that the song was "'pretty much written in a day'". He added, "'I was contemplating the end of things, relationships and the challenges that you face. It's an exhortation to myself – and to anyone who's going through that – to not think it's the end, to keep on pushing, keep on believing. It's a song of hope, I think'".

== Release ==
"Don't Dream It's Over" was recorded for Crowded House's 1986 debut album, Crowded House. It was released as a single on 20 October 1986.

== Reception ==
A "melancholic but hopeful anthem", "Don't Dream It's Over" became the band's signature song and biggest international hit, reaching No. 2 on the US Billboard Hot 100 in April 1987. The song reached No. 1 in Canada and in Finn's native New Zealand, while in Australia, it peaked at No. 8. In Europe, it reached No. 6 in Norway, No. 5 in the Netherlands, No. 13 in West Germany, and No. 25 in the United Kingdom.

At the 1986 Countdown Australian Music Awards, the song was nominated for three awards, winning Best Video.

In May 2001, the Australasian Performing Right Association (APRA) ranked "Don't Dream It's Over" second on its list of the Top 100 New Zealand songs of all time and seventh on its list of the Top 100 Australian songs of all time. In January 2018, as part of Triple M's "Ozzest 100", the 'most Australian' songs of all time, "Don't Dream It's Over" was ranked number 65. In 2025 the song was voted 5th in the Triple J Hottest 100 of Australian Songs.

AllMusic described the song as a "majestic ballad". Cash Box said: "The easy going and pretty song camouflages a pained longing. Neil Finn's voice, recognisable from his stint with Split Enz, is reedy and expressive and full of irony."

In 2025, Neil Crossley of MusicRadar.com wrote that "Don't Dream It's Over" "traverses genres and generations. It is also a masterpiece of the songwriting craft which, 40 years since its release, resonates as strongly as ever".

== Music video ==
The music video for the song was produced by Australian film production company Meaningful Eye Contact and was directed by Alex Proyas. The video features some surreal special effects such as household objects—including shattering crockery—and film reels that float in the air, with lead singer Neil Finn playing a guitar and walking through the same house during different time periods while his bandmates are either performing household chores or playing various backing instruments. The video was nominated for Best Group Video and Best Direction at the 1987 MTV Video Music Awards, and earned the band a Best New Artist award.

== Track listings ==
"Don't Dream It's Over", written by Neil Finn. "That's What I Call Love", written by Neil Finn and Paul Hester. All tracks on vinyl, from the album Crowded House except the extended version of "Don't Dream It's Over". All live tracks, recorded on Phil Jupitus Show at BBC GLR, 21 June 1996.

- 7-inch vinyl
1. "Don't Dream It's Over" – 4:03
2. "That's What I Call Love" – 3:39
- 12-inch vinyl
1. "Don't Dream It's Over" (Extended version) – 6:10 (only in 12-inch vinyl single)
2. "Don't Dream It's Over" – 4:03
3. "That's What I Call Love" – 3:39
- 7-inch US vinyl (American Pie label)
1. "Don't Dream It's Over" – 4:03
2. "Something So Strong" – 2:51
- 1996 UK CD1
1. "Don't Dream It's Over" – 3:53
2. "Weather with You" (live) – 4:35
3. "Into Temptation" (live) – 4:48
4. "Locked Out" (live) – 2:04
- 1996 UK CD2
1. "Don't Dream It's Over" – 3:53
2. "Four Seasons in One Day" (live) – 3:08
3. "In My Command" (live) – 4:14
4. "Pineapple Head" (live) – 3:40

== Personnel ==
- Neil Finn: lead vocals, guitars
- Nick Seymour: bass guitar
- Paul Hester: drums, backing vocals
- Mitchell Froom: keyboards and organ
- Tim Pierce: guitar
- Jorge Bermudez: percussion
- Noel Crombie, Jim Gilstrap, Andy Milton and Joe Satriani: backing vocals

== Charts ==
=== Weekly charts ===
Chart (1986–1987)	Peak position
Australia (Kent Music Report)	8
Belgium (Ultratop 50 Flanders)	6
Canada Top Singles (RPM)	1
Canada Adult Contemporary (RPM)	22
Ireland (IRMA)	19
Israel (Israeli Singles Chart)	27
Italy Airplay (Music & Media)	4
Netherlands (Dutch Top 40)	5
Netherlands (Single Top 100)	7
New Zealand (Recorded Music NZ)	1
Norway (VG-lista)	6
UK Singles (Official Charts)	27
US Billboard Hot 100	2
US Adult Contemporary (Billboard)	9
US Album Rock Tracks (Billboard)	11
West Germany (GfK)	13

Chart (1996)	Peak position
Scottish Singles Sales (Official Charts)	23
UK Singles (Official Charts)	25

Chart (2024)	Peak position
Global 200 (Billboard)	130
Lithuania (AGATA)	86
Sweden Heatseeker (Sverigetopplistan)	6
UK Singles (OCC)	32
US Hot Rock & Alternative Songs (Billboard)	15

=== Year-end charts ===
Chart (1987)	Position
Australia (Australian Music Report)	54
Belgium (Ultratop)	77
Canada Top Singles (RPM)	34
Netherlands (Dutch Top 40)	26
Netherlands (Single Top 100)	44
New Zealand (RIANZ)	4
US Billboard Hot 100	13

Chart (2025)	Position
Australia (ARIA)	98

== Certifications ==
Region	Certification	Certified units/sales
Australia (ARIA)	9× Platinum	630,000^{‡}
Denmark (IFPI Danmark)	Gold	45,000^{‡}
New Zealand (RMNZ)	8× Platinum	240,000^{‡}
Spain (Promusicae)	Platinum	60,000^{‡}
United Kingdom (BPI) Sales since 2004	2× Platinum	1,200,000^{‡}
^{‡} Sales+streaming figures based on certification alone.

== Other versions ==
The song has been recorded by other artists, including Paul Young, Sixpence None the Richer, and New Zealand artist Stan Walker—the latter producing a Māori version titled Moemoeā ("Dream"). Italian singer-songwriter Antonello Venditti performed an adaptation in Italian entitled "Alta marea" ("High Tide").

=== Paul Young version ===
"Don't Dream It's Over"

Single by Paul Young

from the album From Time to Time – The Singles Collection
- B-side: "I Need Somebody"
- Released: 14 October 1991
- Length: 3:56
- Label: Columbia
- Songwriter: Neil Finn
- Producer: Dan Hartman

Paul Young singles chronology
"Both Sides, Now" (1991)	"Don't Dream It's Over" (1991)	"Come On In" (1991)

In 1991, British musician Paul Young covered "Don't Dream It's Over" on his first compilation album, From Time to Time – The Singles Collection (1991). Young's version, released by Columbia Records, was produced by Dan Hartman, and featured Paul Carrack singing the fourth chorus and performing the keyboard and synthesizers.

=== Track listing ===
- UK 7-inch and cassette single
1. "Don't Dream It's Over" (Neil Finn) – 3:56
2. "I Need Somebody" (Paul Young) – 4:00

=== Personnel ===
- Paul Young: lead vocals
- Paul Carrack: co-lead & backing vocals, Hammond organ
- Dan Hartman, Neil Hubbard & Neil Taylor: guitars
- Pino Palladino: bass guitar
- Steve Ferrone: drums
- Danny Schogger: keyboards
- Danny Cummings: percussion
- George Chandler, Jimmy Chambers & Tony Jackson: backing vocals

=== Charts ===
==== Weekly charts ====
Chart (1991)	Peak position
Belgium (Ultratop 50 Flanders)	48
Europe (Eurochart Hot 100)	30
Europe (European Hit Radio)	9
France (SNEP)	27
Germany (GfK)	71
Ireland (IRMA)	13
Luxembourg (Radio Luxembourg)	5
Netherlands (Single Top 100)	67
Norway (VG-lista)	6
Sweden (Sverigetopplistan)	25
UK Singles (Official Charts)	20
UK Airplay (Music Week)	3

==== Year-end charts ====
Chart (1991)	Position
Europe (European Hit Radio)	77

=== Sixpence None the Richer version ===
"Don't Dream It's Over"

Single by Sixpence None the Richer

from the album Divine Discontent
- B-side: "Don't Pass Me By"
- Released: 21 January 2003
- Length: 4:03
- Label: Reprise; Squint
- Songwriter: Neil Finn
- Producer: Rob Cavallo

Sixpence None the Richer singles chronology
"Breathe Your Name" (2002)	"Don't Dream It's Over" (2003)	"My Dear Machine" (2008)

"Don't Dream It's Over" was the second radio single released in promotion of the album Divine Discontent by Sixpence None the Richer. The commercial single release features the B-side "Don't Pass Me By," which was recorded during the sessions for Divine Discontent. Their version was also included in the 2003 compilation album Smallville: The Talon Mix.

=== Track listing ===
- US CD single
1. "Don't Dream It's Over" (radio edit) – 3:39
2. "Don't Pass Me By" – 3:26

=== Charts ===
==== Weekly charts ====
Chart (2003)	Peak position
Romania (Romanian Top 100)	24
US Billboard Hot 100	78
US Adult Contemporary (Billboard)	12
US Adult Pop Airplay (Billboard)	9

==== Year-end charts ====
Chart (2003)	Position
US Adult Contemporary (Billboard)	30
US Adult Top 40 (Billboard)	39

=== Release history ===
Region	Date	Format(s)	Label(s)	Ref.
United States	21 January 2003	Hot adult contemporary radio	Reprise; Squint	
United States	17 February 2003	Contemporary hit; adult contemporary radio	Reprise; Squint	

=== Antonello Venditti adaptation ===
Italian singer-songwriter Antonello Venditti performed an adaptation in Italian entitled "Alta marea" ("High Tide"), inspired by Monte Argentario and recorded for his 1991 album Benvenuti in paradiso (Welcome to Heaven), which remains one of his best-remembered songs to this day. A 16-year-old Angelina Jolie appears in the video.

== In popular culture ==
"Don't Dream It's Over" was prominently featured in the 1994 miniseries adaptation of Stephen King's novel The Stand and in the Netflix series Monsters: The Lyle and Erik Menendez Story in which the song was also referenced in the episode of the same name.
