= The Fatherless and the Widow =

Studio album by Sixpence None the Richer
- Released: April 26, 1994
- Recorded: The Sonic Temple, Elgin, IL and Select Sound, Buffalo, NY
- Genres: Christian rock, alternative rock, pop rock
- Length: 40:22
- Label: R.E.X.
- Producer: Armand John Petri

Sixpence None the Richer chronology
The Fatherless and the Widow (1994)	This Beautiful Mess (1995)

Professional ratings
Review scores
Source	Rating
AllMusic	2.5/5 stars
Cross Rhythms	10/10 squares

The Fatherless and the Widow is the debut studio album by American band Sixpence None the Richer, released in 1994.

== Track listing ==
All songs written by Matt Slocum, except "Spotlight" by T.J. Behling.

1. "Field of Flowers" – 2:37
2. "Spotlight" – 3:51
3. "The Fatherless and the Widow" – 4:44
4. "Musings" – 4:34
5. "Trust" – 3:25
6. "Falling Leaves" – 3:31
7. "Meaningless" – 5:08
8. "Soul" – 3:50
9. "An Apology" – 4:40
10. "Trust (Reprise)" – 4:02

== Personnel ==
Sixpence None the Richer

- Leigh Bingham – vocals
- Matt Slocum – guitars, keyboards, bass, backing vocals on "Trust"

Additional musicians

- Chris Dodds – drums
- Armand John Petri – percussion
- Joseph Rozier – piano and string arrangements on "Trust (Reprise)"
- Native Soil Cello Trio on "Trust (Reprise)"
  - Bryan Eckenrode
  - Alfred B. Frenning
  - Robbie Hausman

Production

- Armand John Petri – producer, engineer, mixing
- Tyler Bacon – executive producer
- Peter Gavin Morkel – executive producer
- John Caruso – assistant engineer on "Trust (Reprise)"
- Joe Brescio – mastering
- Duncan Stanbury – mastering
- Jeff Spencer – art direction, design
- Nosegrind Creative – art direction, design
- Tony Gerber – digital image processing, layout
- Michael Wilson – photography

Studios

- The Sonic Temple (Elgin, IL) – recording (all except "Trust (Reprise)")
- Select Sound (Buffalo, NY) – recording location for "Trust (Reprise)"
- Master Cutting Room (New York, NY) – mastering location
