= The State I'm In (Leigh Nash album) =

Studio album by Leigh Nash
- Released: September 18, 2015
- Genre: Country
- Length: 38:38
- Producer: Brendan Benson

Leigh Nash chronology
Hymns and Sacred Songs (2011)	The State I'm In (2015)	The Tide (2021)

The State I'm In is the first country music studio album from Leigh Nash. She released the project on September 18, 2015. Nash worked with producer Brendan Benson, in the production of this album.

== Background ==
Nash worked with producer Brendan Benson, in the creation of this album. The album has a traditional country feel, and Nash cited country artists such as Willie Nelson, Patsy Cline and Jim Reeves as influences. The album a recurring theme of being homesick. A single, "Somebody's Yesterday", co-written with Gerry House, was released from the album.

The album debuted on the Top Country Albums chart at No. 39, and No. 18 on the Heatseeker Albums chart, with 1,100 copies sold on its debut week.

== Critical reception ==
Professional ratings
Review scores
Source	Rating
Jesus Freak Hideout	5/5 stars

Awarding the album five stars from Jesus Freak Hideout, Ryan Barbee states, "it's fresh, melancholy but hopeful, whimsical, and endearing."

=== Accolades ===
Publication	Rank	List
The Guardian	4	The 10 Best Country Albums of 2015

== Track listing ==
No.	Title	Writer(s)	Length
1.	"Spider and the Moth"	Jesse Hall, Leigh Nash	3:49
2.	"Cruel Heart"	Hall, Nash	3:16
3.	"Chicago"	Hall, Nash, Emily West, Stephen Wilson	3:37
4.	"Mountain"	Hall, Nash	2:37
5.	"What's Behind Me"	Hall, Nash, Stephen Wilson	3:05
6.	"Somebody's Yesterday"	Gerry House, Nash	2:59
7.	"The Promise Break"	House, Nash	2:54
8.	"Dreaming Out Loud"	Hall, Nash	3:37
9.	"The State I'm In"	Nash, Wilson	3:18
10.	"High Is Better"	Nash, Wilson	3:24
11.	"Tell Me Now Tennessee"	Nash, Wilson	3:13
12.	"Doing It Wrong"	Brendan Benson, Nash	2:49
Total length:			38:38

== Charts ==
Chart (2015)	Peak position
US Top Country Albums (Billboard)	39
US Heatseekers Albums (Billboard)	18
