= Burlap to Cashmere =

Contemporary Christian world music band

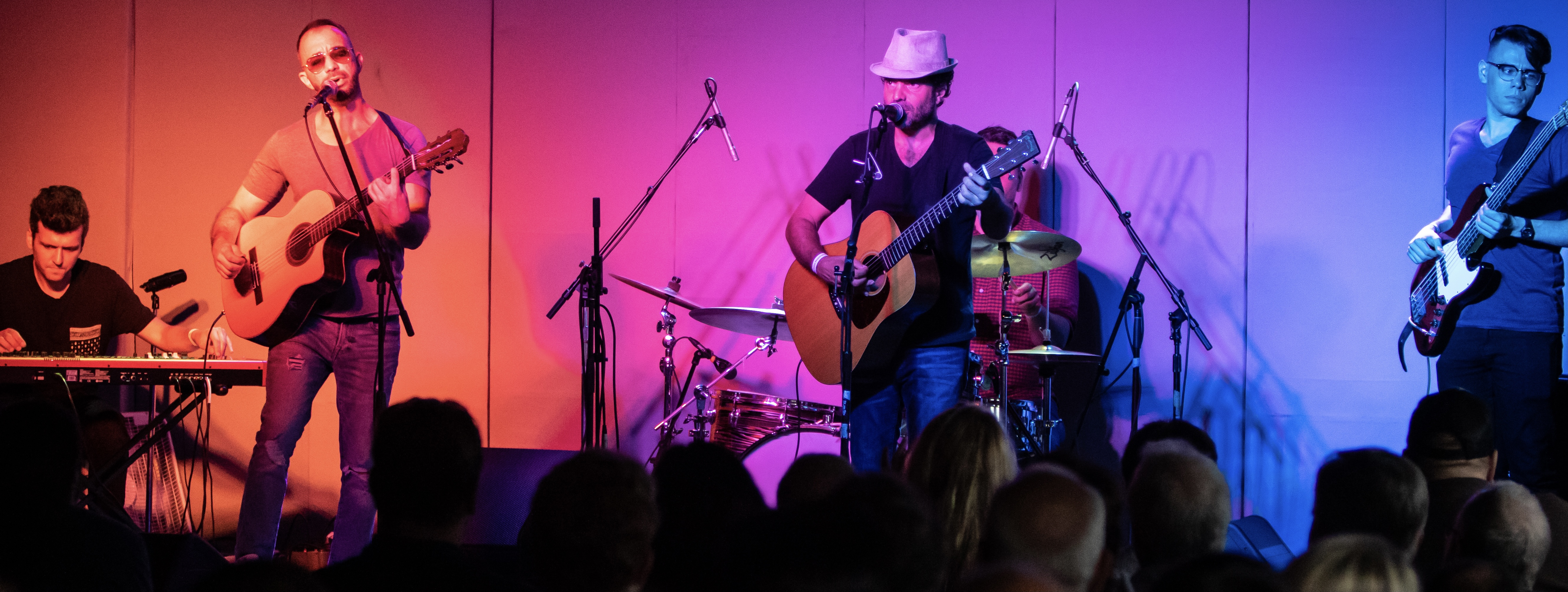
- Burlap to Cashmere performing in 2019

Background information
- Origin: New York City, United States
- Genres: Worldbeat, acoustic, contemporary Christian
- Years active: 1994–present

Burlap to Cashmere is a contemporary Christian world music band formed in the 1990s by Steven Delopoulos and Johnny Phillips. Their music draws heavily on folk and world music influences, especially Greek folk music.

== Background ==
Burlap to Cashmere was formed in the winter of 1994 by cousins John Philippidis and Steven Delopoulos. The troupe was originally a college theater show that Steven Delopoulos put together for his final exam at Marymount Manhattan College, a theater and dance college which Delopoulos attended. He later asked his then 14-year-old cousin Johnny to join him in the show, and the band was formed. Members Mike Ernest (guitar) and childhood friend Theodore Pagano (drums) followed.

In 1995 manager Jamison Ernest arranged for them to play at The Bitter End on a regular basis.

In 1998 Burlap to Cashmere signed with A&M Records and released the full-length recording Anybody Out There? followed by an A&M re-release of Live at the Bitter End, but the constant touring "caused Burlap to burn bright and then burn out."

In 2005, a new Burlap to Cashmere demo album was recorded. The demo was never released. While returning home from the studio, John Philippidis was nearly beaten to death in an altercation that took place subsequent to a minor motor vehicle accident.

In 2007, Burlap to Cashmere was billed on tour dates for Jars of Clay and NEEDTOBREATHE, with Delopoulos and Philippidis performing an acoustic set as a duo.

On July 19, 2011, Burlap to Cashmere released their first full-length album in 13 years, the self-titled Burlap to Cashmere.

In 2012, the band was recruited by director Brett Leonard to be the launch artist for his musical cinema concept "PopFictionLife". The resulting full-length feature The Other Country - Starring Burlap to Cashmere was shot on the road during one of the band's tours, with subsequent filming done around Los Angeles. The movie tells the story of the band's history, along with live concert footage and recordings. The film also stars Samantha Lockwood and America's Next Top Model winner Nicole Fox.

In 2015, the band released their third album, Freedom Souls, as a digital-only release.

=== Solo projects ===
In 2003, Delopoulos released a solo album, Me Died Blue, on Universal South Records. 1000 copies of a live recording, Live at the Bluebird, was released exclusively at tour shows. Delopoulos released a second solo album, Straightjacket, in late 2007.

Delopoulos released "Yellow and Green" on February 14, 2019.

Philippidis, under the name "Johnny Philipps", has toured with a band called Tamarama, as well as recording sessions including T.V. and film work.

== Members ==
- Steven Delopoulos – songwriter, lead vocals, guitar
- John Philippidis – guitar, vocals
- Theodore Pagano – drums
- Roby Guanera – bass
- Mike Ernest – guitar
- Scott Barksdale – percussion

== Discography ==
- Live at the Bitter End (1997)

1. "Anybody Out There?" (live)
2. "Chop Chop" (live)
3. "Divorce" (live)
4. "Eileen's Song" (live)
5. "Basic Instructions" (live)

- Anybody Out There? (1998)

1. "Digee Dime"
2. "Eileen's Song"
3. "Basic Instructions"
4. "Chop Chop"
5. "Anybody Out There?"
6. "Treasures In Heaven"
7. "Skin Is Burning"
8. "Divorce"
9. "Good Man"
10. "Scenes"
11. "Ancient Man"
12. "Mansions"

- Burlap to Cashmere (2011)

1. "Don't Forget to Write"
2. "Build a Wall"
3. "Tonight"
4. "Love Reclaims the Atmosphere"
5. "Closer to the Edge"
6. "Orchestrated Love Song"
7. "Live in a Van"
8. "Santorini"
9. "Hey Man"
10. "Seasons"
11. "The Other Country"

- From the Vault: Exclusive Content (2013)

1. "Closer to the Edge" (alternative version)
2. "Live in a Van" (alternative version)
3. "Tonilou" (live)
4. "Live in a Van" (live)

- From the Vault EP (2015)

1. "Black Stain"
2. "Down to the Cellar"
3. "A Possible Anna"
4. "Dark City"
5. "Middle Class Man"
6. "May I Never Find You"

- Freedom Souls (2015)

1. "I Will Follow"
2. "The Great I Am"
3. "Freedom Souls"
4. "Tonilou"
5. "16 Miles"
6. "Passover"
7. "Agape Mou"
8. "Brain Fog"
9. "River in My Head"
10. "Dialing God"
11. "Dialing God (Instrumental)"
