= Leigh Nash =

American singer (born 1976)

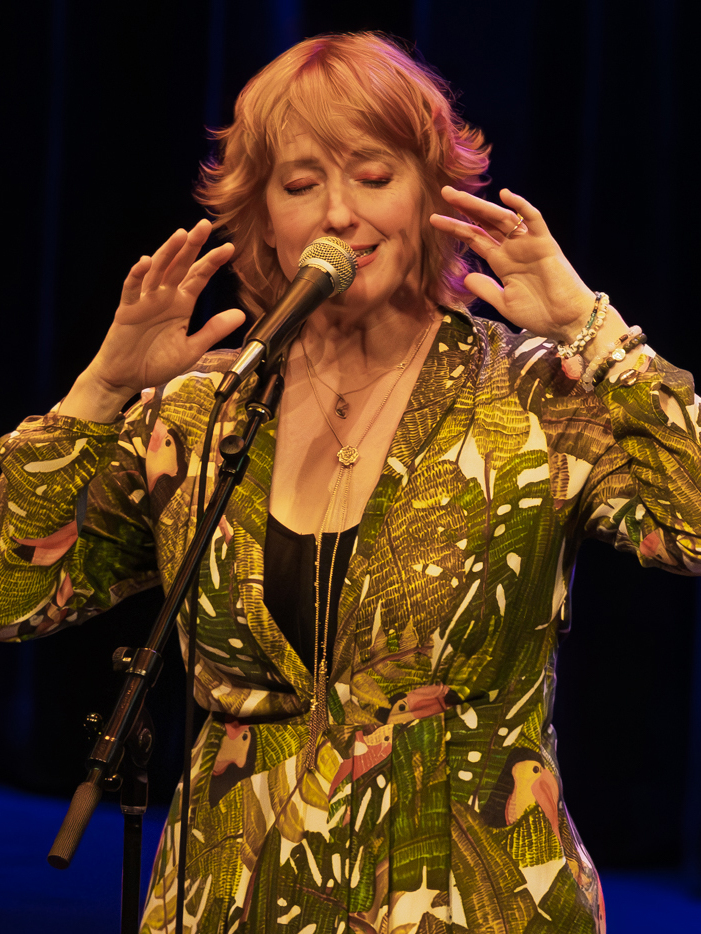
- Nash performing in 2025

Background information
- Born: Leigh Anne Bingham; June 27, 1976 (age 50); New Braunfels, Texas, U.S.
- Genres: Pop rock; soft rock; country
- Occupations: Singer; songwriter
- Years active: 1992–present
- Member of: Sixpence None the Richer
- Formerly of: Fauxliage
- Website: Official website

Leigh Anne Nash (/liː/ LEE; born June 27, 1976) is an American singer and songwriter. She is best known as the lead vocalist of the Christian alternative rock band Sixpence None the Richer, and was also a member of the musical collective Fauxliage. Her debut solo album, Blue on Blue, was released in August 2006, followed by two additional solo albums in 2011 and 2015. Nash has received two Grammy Award nominations: Best Rock Gospel Album in 1998 and Best Pop Performance by a Duo or Group with Vocal in 1999.

== Early life ==
Leigh Anne Bingham Nash was born in New Braunfels, Texas. She started singing country music and learning old country songs on the guitar at the age of 12. She had several years of experience singing in local cafes with a band and performed regularly at a Texan country & western dance hall. She met guitarist and songwriter Matt Slocum at a church retreat in the early 1990s.

== Career ==
Leigh Nash and Matt Slocum formed Sixpence None the Richer (named for a line from the book Mere Christianity by the author C. S. Lewis) soon after and went on to record four full-length albums with the band. Their first album, released when she was age 17, was The Fatherless & the Widow. The album garnered critical acclaim and Slocum and Nash searched for new band members.

Joined by Tess Wiley, Dale Baker, and J.J. Plascencio, the new band recorded This Beautiful Mess, which won a Dove Award for Best Album. Wiley quit the band after their US tour and the band released the Tickets for a Prayer Wheel EP and then signed to the Squint Records label following the demise of R.E.X.

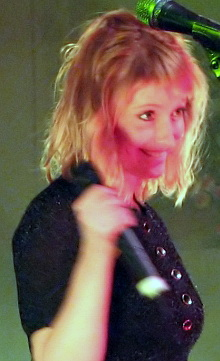
Leigh Nash with Jars of Clay in Toronto in 2009

The band's self-titled album was released in 1997 and the single "Kiss Me" in 1999. In 1999 they received numerous Dove Awards, including Best Artist of the Year. The band was also nominated for a Grammy Award. A second single, a cover of the La's "There She Goes", also hit the Billboard Hot 100, followed by a third single, "I Can't Catch You."

In 2000, Nash sang the song "Need to Be Next to You" for the movie Bounce. Written by Diane Warren, it became Nash's first solo single.

After the departure of drummer Dale Baker and bass player J.J. Plascencio, Sixpence None the Richer released Divine Discontent in 2001. Two singles from that album, "Breathe Your Name" and a cover of Crowded House's 1986 hit single "Don't Dream It's Over", charted on the US Adult Top 40 at No. 18 and No. 9, respectively.

In 2004, Sixpence None the Richer announced their breakup by letter from Matt Slocum to CCM Magazine. After that, the band released The Best of Sixpence None the Richer. Nash and her husband left their Nashville home of 10 years and moved to Los Angeles.

Nash released her first solo record, Blue on Blue, in August 2006 on One Son Records, Nash's own imprint label through Nettwerk Productions. The first single, "My Idea of Heaven", was released to U.S. radio the week of July 14, 2006, and the song "Ocean Size Love" was to be the second single, but it was a promo release only. She has also recorded a song "Mirrors and Smoke" with the band Jars of Clay on their album Good Monsters the same year. She also performed the song "A Place for Us" (written by Bryan Adams) with Tyler James for the 2007 Disney film Bridge to Terabithia.

In 2007, Nash began a new band, Fauxliage, with Canadian band Delerium, which released a self-titled album on August 14, 2007. Nash, Megan Thompson and Kate York also started a Christian band called Thompson, York & Nash. They worked on a few songs that have been put on MySpace. However, none of the songs posted on their MySpace page have been formally released.

Nash has since rejoined Sixpence and worked on a new EP My Dear Machine EP, and the Christmas album The Dawn of Grace. Guitarist Tess Wiley returned to the band to support them on a European tour.

Nash joined Open Wings-Broken Strings tour in late 2009, along with Ed Kowalczyk of Live and Art Alexakis of Everclear. In 2011 she released a worship album entitled Hymns and Sacred Songs, and in August 2012, she released Lost in Transition, her sixth studio album with Sixpence None the Richer.

On September 18, 2015, Nash released her album: The State I'm In. She writes for BMG.

In 2018, Nash released a cover of the Pretenders' 1986 single "Don't Get Me Wrong". In an interview, Nash stated that new music will be coming soon and will be crowd-funded. On August 25, 2021, Nash announced The Tide, a six-song project, would be released September 24 and would feature collaborations with Vince Gill, Tanya Tucker, CeCe Winans, Ruby Amanfu, Raul Malo and Stephen Wilson Jr.

In July 2023, it was announced that Nash would be joining 10,000 Maniacs as their new lead singer. Just six months later, however, Nash left the band, with Mary Ramsey returning as lead singer.

== Inspiration ==
Nash has two distinct poles of inspiration: her work with Sixpence in the Christian music sphere and her childhood fascination with older female country artists like Tanya Tucker, Loretta Lynn, and Patsy Cline.

"I started singing country music and learning old country songs on the guitar when I was 12. I was really, really shy but just had this desire to get on stage and started calling clubs myself to ask if I could come down and sing," says Nash, who grew up in the Texas Hill Country town of New Braunfels.

Before long, the adolescent Nash was singing Loretta Lynn and Tanya Tucker songs like "You Ain't Woman Enough to Take My Man" and "Texas When I Die" on alcohol-free, open mic Sunday nights, backed by a middle-aged band of town locals. Later in life her interest in pop acts like the Sundays, Innocence Mission, and the Cranberries provided more formative material for her songwriting and singing.

== Personal life ==
Nash is the younger of two sisters. In May 1996, she married PFR drummer Mark Nash, whom she met while both bands were performing at the Cornerstone Festival in Illinois. The couple divorced in 2007. Nash later married musician Stephen Wilson Jr.

== Discography ==
- Blue on Blue (2006)
- Fauxliage (collaboration with Delerium) (2007)
- Hymns and Sacred Songs (2011)
- The State I'm In (2015)
- The Tide (2025)

=== Other appearances ===
Title	Year	Album
"If Tomorrow Was Forever" (The Normals featuring Leigh Nash)	1998	Better Than This
"Innocente (Falling in Love)" (Delerium featuring Leigh Nash)	2000	Poem
"With Every Breath" (Dan Haseltine and Leigh Nash)	2000	City on a Hill: Songs of Worship and Praise
"Precious Jesus" (Derri Daugherty and Leigh Nash)	2000	City on a Hill: Songs of Worship and Praise
"Run for It" (Delerium featuring Leigh Nash)	2003	Chimera
"Orbit of Me" (Delerium featuring Leigh Nash)	2003	Chimera
"I Sought the Lord" (Bifrost Arts featuring Leigh Nash and Megan Roderick)	2009	Come O Spirit!
"Good" (Matthew West and Leigh Nash)	2011	Music Inspired by The Story
"After All" (The Choir featuring Leigh Nash)	2012	The Loudest Sound Ever Heard
"Still Kill" (Delerium featuring Leigh Nash)	2012	Music Box Opera (Bonus track)
"Baby, It's Cold Outside" (The Choir duet with Leigh Nash)	2013	Peace, Love & Light
"Under the Gun" (Conjure One featuring Leigh Nash)	2013	Holoscenic
"Breathe Baby" (Derri Daugherty)	2018	The Color of Dreams
