= Matt Slocum =

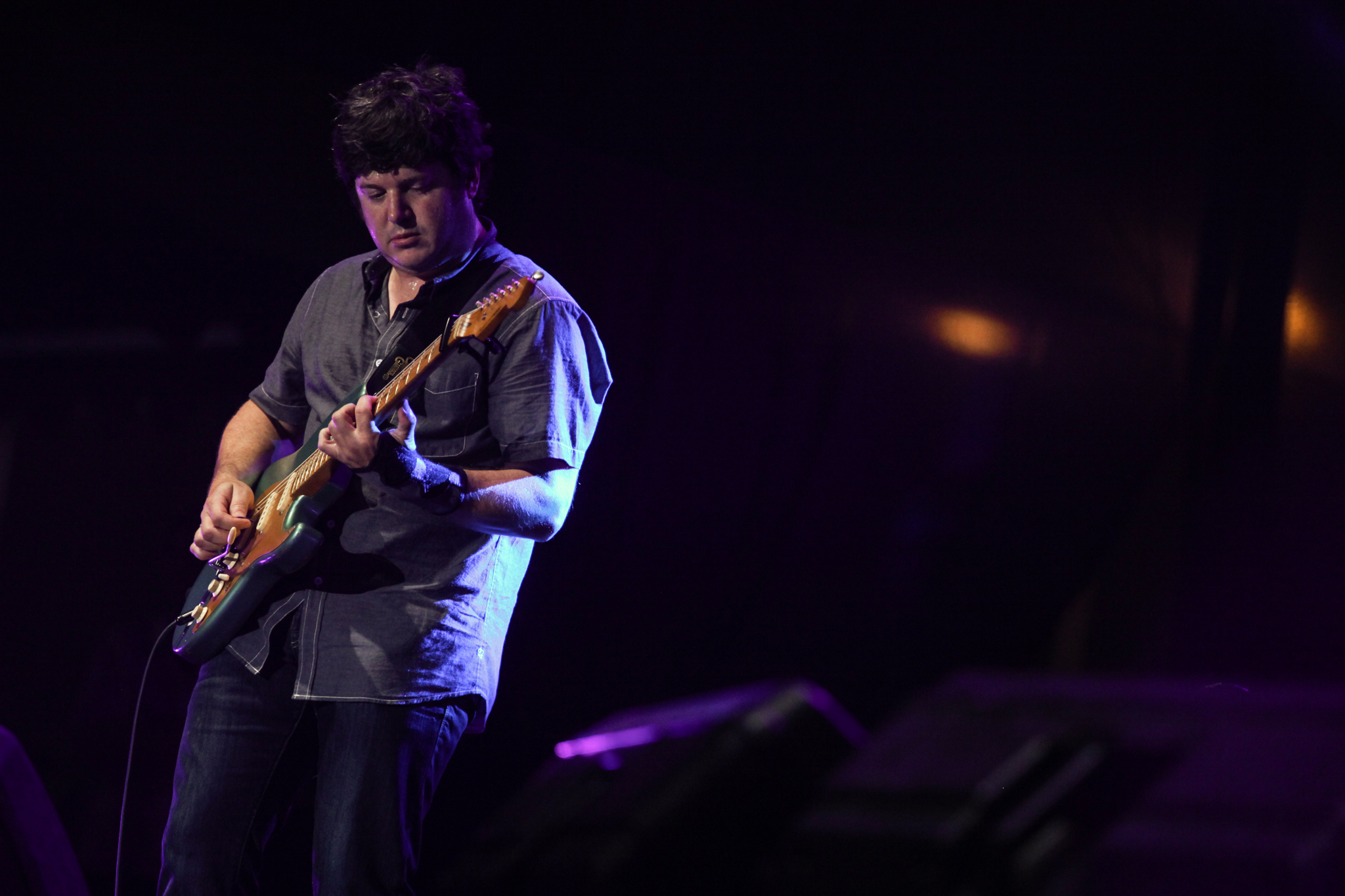
- Slocum performing in Jakarta in June 2013

Background information
- Born: Matt Slocum; December 27, 1972 (age 53); Bristol, Rhode Island, U.S.
- Genres: Pop rock, soft rock, adult album alternative, country
- Occupations: Singer-songwriter, musician
- Instruments: Guitar; bass; cello; piano
- Years active: 1991–present

Matt Slocum (born December 27, 1972) is an American musician and songwriter, known for his work as the principal songwriter and lead guitarist of Sixpence None the Richer.

== Biography ==
Born in Rhode Island to Joseph and Hildegard Slocum, his family moved to New Braunfels, Texas, when he was eight months old, and opened a book store. In 1991, while a senior at New Braunfels High School, Slocum played guitar with Chris Taylor on a garage-band tape release called A Place to Hide Away (Part 1). He was a member of Love Coma, a Christian rock band, and in the early 1990s he met vocalist Leigh Bingham Nash while attending the same church in New Braunfels, Texas. Slocum and Leigh formed Sixpence None the Richer; he and Nash are the band's only constant members. He co-wrote, with Nash, the song "Nervous In the Light of Dawn" for Nash's debut solo album Blue on Blue. In 2006, Slocum toured with the band The Choir, playing bass. He has also played guitar with Over the Rhine, and played bass in the band the Astronaut Pushers.

Slocum played cello on Viva Voce's first album, Hooray for Now. As studio guitarist and cellist, he has recorded on albums by artists Julie Miller, Plumb, Wes King, Switchfoot, Hammock, Lost Dogs, The Choir, Dividing the Plunder, Threefold, and Brooke Waggoner. He also appeared as cellist on the Chris Rice DVD Inside Out.

In 2023, Slocum and Nash joined 10,000 Maniacs; they returned to Sixpence None the Richer the following year.

== Discography ==
- The Fatherless and the Widow (1994)
- This Beautiful Mess (1995)
- Sixpence None the Richer (1997)
- Divine Discontent (2002)
- The Dawn of Grace (2008)
- Lost in Transition (2012)
