= Squint Entertainment =

Record label

- Type: Private
- Industry: Record label
- Founded: 1997, United States
- Founder: Steve Taylor
- Headquarters: United States
- Number of locations: San Francisco, California, U.S.
- Total assets: US$24million
- Owner: Warner Records
- Parent: Warner Music Group

Squint Entertainment was a record label owned by Word Entertainment, started and run by musician and songwriter Steve Taylor in 1997. Squint pushed Sixpence None the Richer to mainstream success with their single "Kiss Me". The band had been in the CCM genre for several years before that. Other successful bands, such as Chevelle, emerged from Squint's brief creative life.

== History ==
It first appeared in the United States in 1997. In an attempt to bring meaningful Christian content to other media, the company started a major film project called St. Gimp. The project was abandoned when Taylor was forced out of the company leadership.

The label name was resurrected by Word Entertainment after Taylor's departure, to create a new, unrelated label as an avenue for potential crossover acts under their newfound partnership with AOL Time Warner. The only common element was the existence of Sixpence None the Richer on the label's roster, due to their existing contract.

== Artists ==
- Burlap to Cashmere
- Chevelle
- The Insyderz
- LA Symphony
- PFR
- Radial Angel
- Sixpence None the Richer
- Strange Celebrity
- 38th Parallel
- Waterdeep

== See also ==
- List of record labels
