= Sixpence None the Richer =

American alternative rock band

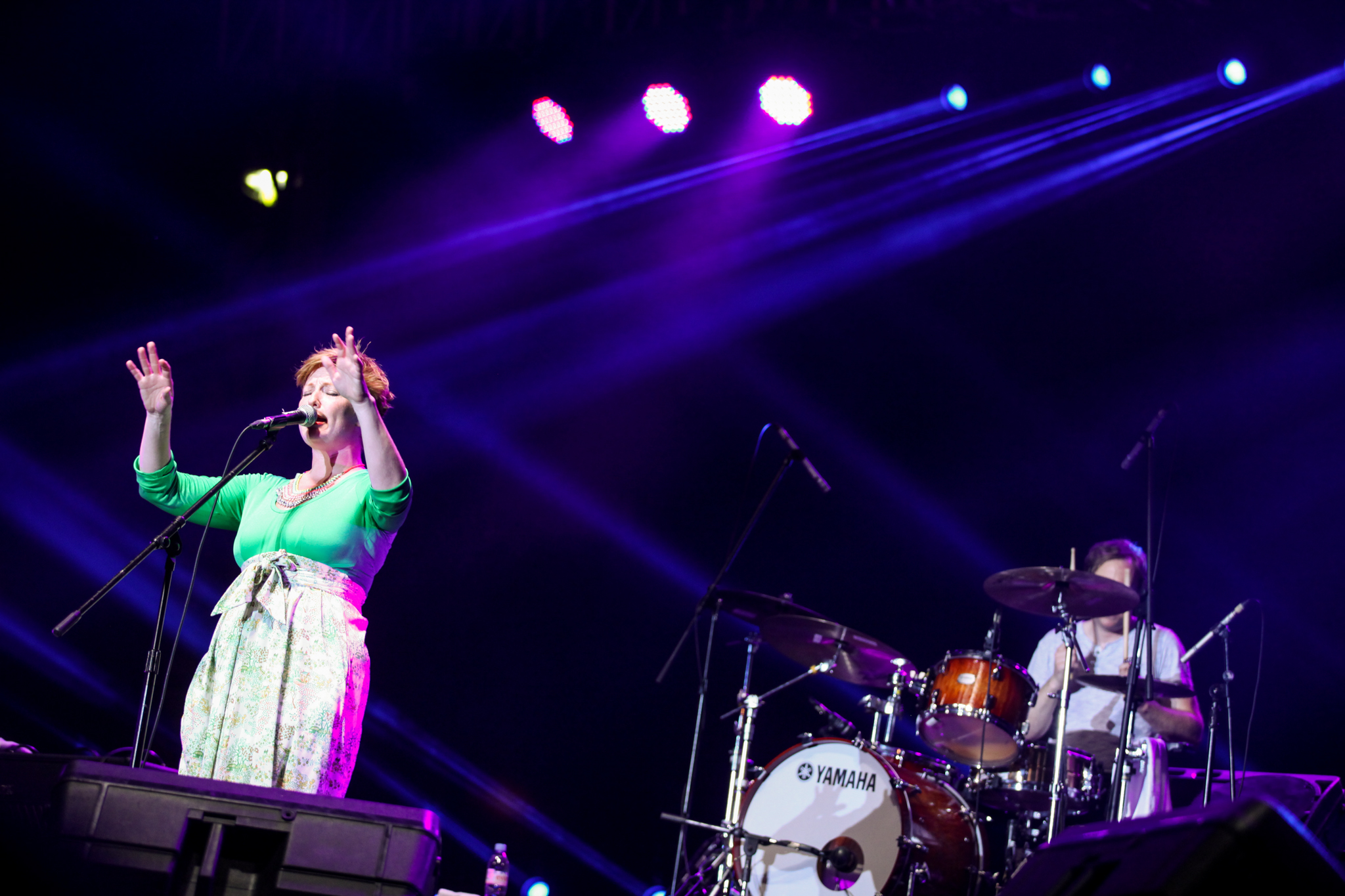
- Sixpence None the Richer live in Jakarta, Indonesia (2013)

Background information
- Origin: New Braunfels, Texas, U.S.
- Genres: Alternative rock, Christian rock
- Years active: 1992–2004, 2007–present
- Labels: R.E.X.; Flying Tart; Squint; Reprise; Nettwerk; Credential; Curb
- Members: Leigh Nash; Matt Slocum; Dale Baker
- Past members: T.J. Behling; Tess Wiley; J.J. Plasencio; Sean Kelly; Jerry Dale McFadden; Rob Mitchell; Jason Lehning; Justin Cary
- Website: sixpencenonethericher.com

Sixpence None the Richer is an American alternative rock band that formed in New Braunfels, Texas, and settled in Nashville, Tennessee. They are best known for their songs "Kiss Me" and "Breathe Your Name", and their covers of "Don't Dream It's Over" and "There She Goes".

The band received two Grammy Award nominations, Best Pop Performance by a Duo or Group with Vocals for "Kiss Me" and Grammy Award for Best Rock Gospel Album for Sixpence None the Richer (1997).

== History ==
=== Formation and early years (1992–1996) ===
Guitarist/songwriter Matt Slocum met Leigh Nash in the early 1990s and recorded a demo, circulated as "The Original Demos", with bassist T.J. Behling at Verge Music Works recording studio in Dallas, and eventually an album, The Fatherless and the Widow, for the independent label R.E.X. Records in 1994. After adding more members, the band toured in support of The Fatherless and the Widow. The band released This Beautiful Mess in 1995.

The band's name was inspired by a passage from C. S. Lewis's book Mere Christianity discussing how there is value in the act of children buying gifts for their parents with the parents' money even though the parents are "none the richer" monetarily (mirroring the Christian God/human dynamic).

=== Into the mainstream (1997–2004) ===
In 1997, the group signed to Steve Taylor's label Squint Entertainment and released a self-titled album, which began garnering attention from mainstream audiences.

In 1998, "Kiss Me" was released as a single, propelling Sixpence None the Richer into the national pop spotlight. The next year, the band followed up with a cover of The La's' "There She Goes". Sixpence appeared on the Late Show with David Letterman, The Tonight Show with Jay Leno, and numerous morning talk shows.

The band had a follow-up album ready to release, but Squint Entertainment started to fall apart, leaving the band in limbo for several years. Finally, Squint Entertainment folded, and the album, Divine Discontent, was released in 2002.

The band made a musical appearance in season 7 episode 16 of the sitcom Sabrina the Teenage Witch (2003).

On February 26, 2004, Matt Slocum announced that the group had disbanded.

=== First reunion and Lost in Transition (2007–2016) ===
In November 2007, Sixpence None the Richer reunited. They released the EP My Dear Machine on the website NoiseTrade in 2008, the band's first official release since The Best of Sixpence None the Richer in 2004. In October 2008, they released a Christmas album, The Dawn of Grace.

Sixpence signed to Credential Recordings and played a headline slot at the 2009 Greenbelt Festival in the UK. According to Nash, the band began recording a new album in 2010. The album, Lost in Transition, was released on August 7, 2012.

=== Second reunion, Rosemary Hill, and Justin Cary's death (2023–present) ===
In September 2023, Nash released a single, "The Tide", that additionally credited Sixpence None the Richer, making it the band's first new song in 11 years. She and Slocum also announced a new tour with 10,000 Maniacs, playing songs by both bands, but in January 2024, Nash and Slocum left the tour early, saying they "had other commitments arise".

In January 2024, it was announced that drummer Dale Baker was returning to the band and that they had signed a management deal with Deep South Entertainment with plans to re-release their self-titled album on vinyl. In June, they announced a 25th-anniversary tour with the classic lineup for the first time since Baker left. In August 2024, they announced a new single, We are Love, and a new EP, Rosemary Hill, released on October 4, 2024.

While the band has made no official announcement of lineup changes, Baker has not played with the band since the anniversary tour. Jon Radford has played live with the band since 2025.

Bassist Justin Cary died on June 18, 2026, at the age of 50, following a stroke.

== Band members ==
Current members

- Leigh Nash – vocals (1992–2004, 2007–present)
- Matt Slocum – guitar, cello (1992–2004, 2007–present)
- Dale Baker – drums (1993–2001, 2024–present)

Current touring members

- Steve Hindalong – percussion, guitars (2024–present)
- Jon Radford – drums (2025–present)

Former members

- T. J. Behling – bass (1992–1993)
- Tess Wiley – guitars, vocals (1995–1996, 2008)
- J. J. Plasencio – bass (1995–1997)
- Sean Kelly – guitars (1997–2004)
- Jerry Dale McFadden – keyboards (2001–2004)
- Rob Mitchell – drums (2001–2004, 2012–2017)
- Jason Lehning – keyboards (2012–2013)
- Justin Cary – bass (1997–2004, 2008–2026; his death)

== Discography ==
- The Fatherless and the Widow (1994)
- This Beautiful Mess (1995)
- Sixpence None the Richer (1997)
- Divine Discontent (2002)
- The Dawn of Grace (2008)
- Lost in Transition (2012)

== Awards and nominations ==
Year	Awards	Work	Category	Result
1996	Dove Awards	This Beautiful Mess	Best Alternative/Modern Rock Album	Won
1998	Dove Awards	Sixpence None the Richer	Best Alternative/Modern Rock Album	Nominated
1998	Dove Awards	Sixpence None the Richer	Recorded Music Packaging of the Year	Nominated
1998	Dove Awards	"Love"	Modern Rock/Alternative Recorded Song of the Year	Nominated
1998	Billboard Music Video Awards	"Kiss Me"	Best New Artist Clip, Contemporary Christian	Nominated
1999	Grammy Awards	Sixpence None the Richer	Best Rock Gospel Album	Nominated
1999	Teen Choice Awards	"Kiss Me"	Choice Music: Love Song	Nominated
1999	Dove Awards	"Kiss Me"	Short Form Music Video of the Year	Nominated
1999	Billboard Music Awards	"Kiss Me"	Top Hot 100 Airplay Track	Nominated
1999	Billboard Music Awards	"Kiss Me"	Top Adult Top 40 Track	Nominated
1999	Billboard Music Awards	"Kiss Me"	Top Soundtrack Single	Won
1999	Billboard Music Awards	Themselves	Top Hot 100 Artist - Duo/Group	Nominated
1999	Billboard Music Awards	Themselves	Top Adult Top 40 Artist	Nominated
2000	Grammy Awards	"Kiss Me"	Best Pop Performance by a Duo or Group with Vocals	Nominated
2000	APRA Music Awards	"Kiss Me"	Most Performed Foreign Work	Nominated
2000	Nickelodeon's Kids' Choice Awards	Themselves	Favorite Band	Nominated
2000	Dove Awards	Themselves	Group of the Year	Won
2001	Young Hollywood Awards	"Kiss Me"	Best Song	Won
2001	BMI Pop Awards	"There She Goes"	Award-Winning Song	Won
2003	Dove Awards	"Breathe Your Name"	Modern Rock/Alternative Recorded Song of the Year	Won
2003	Dove Awards	Divine Discontent	Best Alternative/Modern Rock Album	Nominated
2003	Dove Awards	Themselves	Group of the Year	Nominated
2003	BDSCertified Spin Awards	"Kiss Me"	600,000 Spins	Won
2006	BDSCertified Spin Awards	"Kiss Me"	700,000 Spins	Won
