= The Essential Jars of Clay =

Greatest hits album by Jars of Clay
- Released: September 4, 2007
- Genres: Christian alternative rock; pop rock; folk rock; acoustic; Christmas music
- Length: 134:03
- Label: Essential/Legacy
- Producers: Adrian Belew; Jars of Clay; Stephen Lipson; Dennis Herring; Ron Aniello; Mitch Dane; Steve Hindalong; Robert Beeson

Jars of Clay chronology
Live Monsters (2007)	The Essential Jars of Clay (2007)	Christmas Songs (2007)

Professional ratings
Review scores
Source	Rating
AllMusic	3.5/5 stars
Christianity Today	4.5/5 stars

The Essential Jars of Clay is a greatest hits album from Jars of Clay that was released on September 4, 2007 through Essential Records/Legacy Recordings. This is the last release (along with a simultaneous release of Live Monsters) from the band through Essential Records as they have since moved on to the Nettwerk Music Group's Gray Matters imprint. The album is part of the Sony BMG series The Essential, which is a series of greatest hits collections.

== Track listing ==
All songs written by Dan Haseltine, Charlie Lowell, Matt Odmark, & Stephen Mason, unless otherwise noted

Disc one

1. "Flood" - 3:30
2. "Liquid" - 3:31 (Charlie Lowell, Stephen Mason, Miguel DeJesus, Josh Cougle, Matt Bronleewe)
3. "Worlds Apart" - 5:18
4. "Love Song for a Savior" - 4:45 (Dan Haseltine, Charlie Lowell, Stephen Mason, Matt Bronleewe)
5. "Tea and Sympathy" - 4:46 (Dan Haseltine, Mark Hudson, Greg Wells)
6. "Fade to Grey" - 3:33 (Dan Haseltine, Matt Odmark, Stephen Mason, Charlie Lowell, Matt Bronleewe)
7. "Crazy Times" - 3:35 (Dan Haseltine, Stephen Mason, Mark Hudson, Greg Wells)
8. "Five Candles (You Were There)" - 3:49
9. "Goodbye, Goodnight" - 2:54
10. "Grace" - 4:31 (Dan Haseltine, Matt Odmark, Stephen Mason, Charlie Lowell, Mark Hudson, Greg Wells)
11. "Can't Erase It" - 3:33
12. "Unforgetful You" - 3:20
13. "I Need You" - 3:39
14. "Fly" - 3:19
15. "Silence" - 5:16
16. "Revolution" - 3:42
17. "Coffee Song" - 3:02
18. "New Math" - 3:20

Disc two

1. "Sunny Days" - 3:30
2. "Tonight" - 3:39
3. "Shipwrecked" - 2:52
4. "Faith Enough" - 5:25
5. "Jealous Kind" - 4:09
6. "Needful Hands" (Acoustic Version) - 2:45
7. "Dig" - 3:15 (Gene Eugene, Greg Lawless, Riki Michele, Paul Valadez, Jon Knox)
8. "God Will Lift Up Your Head" - 4:22 (Paul Gerhardt, John Wesley, Dan Haseltine, Charlie Lowell, Matt Odmark, Stephen Mason)
9. "Work" - 3:54
10. "Oh My God" - 6:04
11. "Dead Man (Carry Me)" - 3:19
12. "Mirrors & Smoke" - 3:58
13. "This Road" - 5:07
14. "The Widowing Field" - 3:57
15. "Bethlehem Town" - 4:34
16. "The Little Drummer Boy" - 4:24 (Katherine Davis, Henry Onorati, Harry Simeone)

== Technical credits ==
Compilation personnel

- Jeff Magid - producer
- Dave Donnelly - mastering (at DNA Mastering, Studio City, CA)
- Jim Parham - project direction
- Carol Bobolts - design

Track production

- Ron Aniello - "Sunny Days", "Faith Enough"
- Robert Beeson - "Little Drummer Boy"
- Adrian Belew - "Flood", "Liquid"
- Mitch Dane - "Tonight", "Shipwrecked", "Jealous Kind"
- Dennis Herring - "Goodbye, Goodnight", "Grace", "Can't Erase It", "Unforgetful You"
- Steve Hindalong - "This Road"
- Stephen Lipson - "Tea and Sympathy", "Fade To Grey", "Crazy Times", "Five Candles (You Were There)"
- Jars of Clay - All others ("Worlds Apart", "Love Song For A Savior", "I Need You", "Fly", "Silence", "Revolution", "Coffee Song", "New Math", "Jealous Kind", "Needful Hands", "Dig", "God Will Lift Up Your Head", "Work", "Oh My God", "Dead Man (Carry M)e)", "Mirrors & Smoke", "The Widowing Field", "Bethlehem Town", "Little Drummer Boy")

Photography

- Jeremy Cowart
- Kristen Barlow
- David Dobson
- Michael Wilson
- Jimmy Abegg
- Martyn Atkins
