= List of awards and nominations received by Jars of Clay =

Jars of Clay awards and nominations
Awards and nominations
Award	Wins	Nominations
Grammy Awards	3	5
GMA Dove Awards	9	9
BMI Awards	5	5
American Music Awards	0	3

Jars of Clay has been successful in being nominated for and winning several awards, including prestigious Grammy Awards and several of the Christian music awards, known as the GMA Dove Awards. Some of these successes have been collaborative efforts, including two City on a Hill albums and the inspired collaboration for the 2005 film The Chronicles of Narnia: The Lion, the Witch and the Wardrobe. The group has won five BMI Awards from Broadcast Music Incorporated.

== GMA Dove Awards ==
Year	Award	Result
2004	Group of the Year	Nominated
2004	Rock/Contemporary Album of the Year (Furthermore: From the Studio, From the Stage)	Nominated
2004	Recorded Music Packaging of the Year (Furthermore: From the Studio, From the Stage)	Nominated
2005	Rock/Contemporary Recorded Song of the Year ("Show You Love")	Nominated
2006	Pop/Contemporary Album of the Year (Redemption Songs)	Nominated
2006	Recorded Music Packaging of the Year (Redemption Songs)	Won
2007	Artist of the Year	Nominated
2007	Group of the Year	Nominated
2007	Pop/Contemporary Recorded Song of the Year ("Dead Man (Carry Me)")	Nominated
2007	Rock/Contemporary Recorded Song of the Year ("Work")	Nominated
2007	Rock/Contemporary Album of the Year (Good Monsters)	Won
2007	Short Form Music Video of the Year ("Work")	Won
2008	Christmas Album of the Year (Christmas Songs)	Nominated
2010	Artist of the Year	Nominated
2010	Group of the Year	Nominated
2010	Song of the Year ("Two Hands")	Nominated
2010	Pop/Contemporary Album of the Year (The Long Fall Back to Earth)	Won
2010	Recorded Music Packaging of the Year (The Long Fall Back to Earth: Deluxe Edition)	Won
2010	Recorded Music Packaging of the Year (The Long Fall Back to Earth)	Nominated
2011	Pop/Contemporary Album of the Year (Jars of Clay Presents: The Shelter)	Nominated
2011	Praise & Worship Album of the Year (Jars of Clay Presents: The Shelter)	Nominated
2014	Rock/Contemporary Album of the Year (Inland)	Nominated

== Grammy Awards ==
Year	Category	Result
1996	Best Rock Gospel Album (Jars of Clay)	Nominated
1998	Best Pop/Contemporary Gospel Album (Much Afraid)	Won
2000	Best Pop/Contemporary Gospel Album (If I Left the Zoo)	Won
2002	Best Pop/Contemporary Gospel Album (The Eleventh Hour)	Won
2010	Best Pop/Contemporary Gospel Album (The Long Fall Back to Earth)	Nominated

== Broadcast Music Incorporated ==
The following songs were awarded by BMI as some of the most performed songs in their genre:

Year	Category	Result
1996	"Flood"	Won
2000	"Can't Erase It"	Won
2002	"I Need You"	Won
2002	"Fly"	Won
2003	"The Valley Song (Sing of Your Mercy)"	Won

== American Music Awards ==
Year	Category	Result
2002	Contemporary Inspirational - Favourite Artist	Nominated
2003	Contemporary Inspirational - Favourite Artist	Nominated
2005	Contemporary Inspirational - Favourite Artist	Nominated
