= Jar of Gems =

Greatest hits album by Jars of Clay
- Released: 2001
- Recorded: 1995–1999
- Genre: Christian rock, pop rock
- Label: Essential/Zomba
- Producer: Various

Jars of Clay chronology
The White Elephant Sessions (1999)	Jar of Gems (2001)	The Eleventh Hour (2002)

Jar of Gems is a greatest hits album by Jars of Clay that was released exclusively in Singapore and the Philippines due to the band's popularity in those countries. The 12-track compilation on the first disc features all of the band's radio singles that were released in Singapore and the Philippines. The second disc features several of the tracks that appear on the 1999 rarities album, The White Elephant Sessions. Fans in other parts of the world have been able to purchase the album through various online retailers, as well as through the Official Jars of Clay Fanclub at one point in time. It was rated three stars by AllMusic.

== Track listing ==
Disc One

1. "Love Song for a Savior"
2. "Like a Child"
3. "Liquid"
4. "Blind"
5. "Tea And Sympathy"
6. "Flood"
7. "Five Candles (You Were There)"
8. "Unforgetful You"
9. "Collide"
10. "No One Loves Me Like You"
11. "Famous Last Words"
12. "Hand"

Disc Two

1. "Unforgetful You" (Remix)
2. "Can't Erase It" (Tweed Horse Sessions)
3. "The New Math" (Tweed Horse Sessions)
4. "Collide" (Tweed Horse Sessions)
5. "Grace" (Hudson & Wells Demo)
6. "The Coffee Song" (from Seatbelt Tuba)
7. "Frail" (Instrumental)
