= Missing =

Missing or The Missing may refer to:

== Film ==
- Missing (1918 film), an American silent drama directed by James Young
- Missing (1982 film), an American historical drama directed by Costa-Gavras about the 1973 coup in Chile
- Missing (2007 film), a Belgian film that was a 2007 box office number-one film in Belgium
- Missing, a 2007 film featuring Nao Ōmori
- Missing (2008 film), a Hong Kong horror film directed by Tsui Hark
- Missing (2009 film), a South Korean film directed by Kim Sung-hong
- Missing (2009 short film), a film starring Susan Glover
- Missing (2010 film), a Jordanian film directed by Tariq Rimawi
- Missing (2016 film), a South Korean film directed by Lee Eon-hee
- Missing (2018 film), an Indian film directed by Mukul Abhyankar
- Missing (2019 film), a Hong Kong film directed by Ronnie Chau
- Missing (2023 film), an American thriller
- Missing, a 2024 film featuring Satomi Ishihara
- The Missing (1999 film), an Australian film directed by Manuela Alberti
- The Missing (2003 Taiwanese film), a Taiwanese drama directed by Lee Kang-sheng
- The Missing (2003 film), an American Western directed by Ron Howard
- The Missing (2017 film), a Chinese action crime film directed by Xu Jinglei
- The Missing (2020 film), a Philippine film directed by Easy Ferrer
- The Missing (2023 film), a Philippine film directed by Carl Joseph Papa

== Literature ==
- Missing (Ward novel), a 1917 novel by Mary Augusta Ward
- Missing (Alvtegen novel), 2000, by Karin Alvtegen
- Missing (novel series), a 2005 Japanese light novel series and manga
- Missing, a Fear Street book by R.L. Stine
- The Missing (novel series), a 2008 series of young-adult novels by Margaret Peterson Haddix
- The Missing, a 2009 novel by Tim Gautreaux

== Music ==
=== Albums ===
- Missing (album), a 2014 album by Lala Hsu
- Missing (EP), a 1995 EP by Drunk Tank
- Missing, a 2005 EP by City and Colour

=== Songs ===
- "Missing" (Everything but the Girl song), 1994
- "Missing" (Teen Top song), 2014
- "Missing", by Beck from Guero, 2005
- "Missing", by Bruce Springsteen from The Essential Bruce Springsteen, 2003
- "Missing", by Eliza Doolittle from Eliza Doolittle, 2010
- "Missing", by Evanescence from Anywhere but Home, 2004
- "Missing", by Flyleaf from Memento Mori, 2009
- "Missing", by Gucci Mane from The Appeal: Georgia's Most Wanted, 2010
- "Missing", by London Grammar from Californian Soil, 2021
- "Missing", by the McGuire Sisters, 1956
- "Missing", by Melvins from Electroretard, 2001
- "Missing", by Slowthai from Nothing Great About Britain, 2019
- "Missing", by William Michael Morgan from Vinyl, 2016
- "Missing", by the xx from Coexist, 2012
- "The Missing", by Cassius, Ryan Tedder and Jaw from Ibifornia, 2016
- "The Missing", by Deerhunter from Monomania, 2013
- "The Missing", by Ministry from The Land of Rape and Honey, 1988

== Television ==
- Missing (TV program), a 2003 American syndicated missing-persons program
- Missing (Canadian TV series) (originally titled 1-800-Missing), 2003
- Missing (2006 TV series), a British crime drama
- Missing (2009 TV series), a British police drama
- Missing (American TV series), 2012
- Missing (Singaporean TV series), 2018
- The Missing (British TV series), 2014
- The Missing (South Korean TV series), 2015
- Missing Live (titled Missing from 2005–2007 and 2011), a 2005 British missing-persons morning program

=== Episodes ===
- "Missing" (.hack//Roots)
- "Missing" (Adam-12)
- "Missing" (Arrow)
- "Missing" (Baywatch)
- "Missing" (The Bill)
- "Missing" (Blue Heelers)
- "Missing" (Body of Proof)
- "Missing" (Brothers & Sisters)
- "Missing" (Dallas)
- "Missing" (Doctors)
- "Missing" (ER)
- "Missing" (La Femme Nikita)
- "Missing" (A Fine Romance)
- "Missing" (Flipper)
- "Missing" (Heartbeat)
- "Missing" (In the Heat of the Night)
- "Missing" (The Killing)
- "Missing" (Law & Order)
- "Missing" (Lincoln Heights)
- "Missing" (The Listener)
- "Missing" (Man with a Camera)
- "Missing" (Miami 7)
- "Missing" (My Secret Identity)
- "Missing" (NCIS)
- "Missing" (New York Undercover)
- "Missing" (Orleans)
- "Missing" (Parenthood)
- "Missing" (Perfect Strangers)
- "Missing" (Point Pleasant)
- "Missing" (Power Rangers S.P.D.)
- "Missing" (Powers)
- "Missing" (Roswell)
- "Missing" (Sirens)
- "Missing" (Stargate Atlantis)
- "Missing" (Street Justice)
- "Missing" (Sue Thomas: F.B.Eye)
- "Missing" (Tim and Eric Awesome Show, Great Job!)
- "Missing" (Time Trax)
- "Missing" (Watching)
- "Missing" (Webster)
- "Missing" (Witch Hunter Robin)

== Video games ==
- In Memoriam (video game) (US title: Missing: Since January), a 2003 video game
- The Missing: J.J. Macfield and the Island of Memories, a 2018 video game

== Other ==
- Missing (awareness campaign), a public awareness campaign and NGO in India

== See also ==
- Disappear (disambiguation)
- Disappeared (disambiguation)
- Lost (disambiguation)
- Missing in action
- Missing person
- Missing women (disambiguation)
- Mising (disambiguation)
