= Mirish =

Mirish may refer to:

- Mirisch, a surname
- Miri, people of a town
- Mirish, Iran, a village
