= Disappeared (disambiguation) =

The term disappeared most commonly refers to the victims of forced disappearance.

Disappeared or The Disappeared may also refer to:

- Disappeared (Northern Ireland), forced disappearance during The Troubles
- Missing person, any person who has disappeared and whose status as alive or dead cannot be confirmed

== Film and television ==
- The Disappeared (2008 film), a British horror film by Johnny Kevorkian
- The Disappeared (2012 film), a Canadian drama film by Shandi Mitchell
- Disappeared (TV program), an American program on Investigation Discovery
- "Disappeared" (Law & Order), a television episode
- "The Disappeared" (Star Wars: The Clone Wars), a two-part television episode
- "The Disappeared" (Star Wars Resistance)
- "The Disappeared" (The Strain), a television episode

== Literature ==
- The Disappeared (novel), a 2015 novel by Roger Scruton
- Disappeared, a 1995 play by Phyllis Nagy
- The Disappeared, a 2002 novel by Kristine Kathryn Rusch
- The Disappeared, a 2009 novel by Kim Echlin

== Music ==
- Disappeared (album), a 2000 album by Spring Heel Jack

== See also ==
- Desaparecidos (disambiguation)
- Disappear (disambiguation)
- Disappearance (disambiguation)
- Disappearing (disambiguation)
- Missing (disambiguation)
- Missing women (disambiguation)
