= Needful Hands =

Single by Jars of Clay

from the album Exodus
- Released: 1998
- Recorded: 1998
- Genre: Inspirational
- Length: 3:40 (Album Version)
- Label: Rocketown Records
- Songwriter(s): Dan Haseltine, Charlie Lowell, Stephen Mason, Matt Odmark

Jars of Clay singles chronology
"Truce" (1998)	"Needful Hands" (1998)	"Unforgetful You" (1999)

"Needful Hands" is a song written and performed by Jars of Clay. The song was recorded for the special event album Exodus, which also featured contributions from dc Talk, Sixpence None the Richer, and Third Day, among many other Christian artists. The single reached number one on the Christian adult contemporary airplay charts and number two on Christian CHR in 1998. An acoustic version of "Needful Hands" appears on the album Furthermore: From the Studio, From the Stage.

== Track listing ==
Note: All versions of the song written by Charlie Lowell, Dan Haseltine, Matt Odmark, & Stephen Mason, unless otherwise noted

1. "Needful Hands" (Radio Edit 1) - 3:25
2. "Needful Hands" (Radio Edit 2) - 3:08
3. "Needful Hands" (Album Version) - 3:40
