= Frail (Jars of Clay song) =

1994 song by Jars of Clay

Song by Jars of Clay

from the album Much Afraid
- Recorded: 1997
- Genre: Christian ambient
- Length: 6:57
- Label: Essential
- Songwriter(s): Dan Haseltine, Stephen Mason, Matt Odmark, Charlie Lowell.
- Producer(s): Steve Lipson

"Frail" is a song written and performed by Christian rock band Jars of Clay. It has appeared on many recordings by the group and lends its name to their debut demo release, Frail, from 1994. The song has never been released as a single.

== Background ==
"Frail" was initially the college submission entry for Stephen Mason, guitarist for Jars of Clay. As written by Mason, the song was purely instrumental. After creating Jars of Clay with singer Dan Haseltine and pianist Charlie Lowell, Mason put forward the song to the group. It was then re-recorded for the group's demo, Frail, in 1994, and was chosen as the demo's title track.

In 1995, the band recorded their highly successful debut full-length studio album, Jars of Clay. "Frail" was not chosen to be included on the album, however. Like the song "Fade to Grey," it was added to their next studio album, Much Afraid, in 1997. For the re-recording, lyrics were written by the group, which by this time included second guitarist Matt Odmark. This version is considered to be the "standard" version of the song.

In 1999, following the release of the group's third album, If I Left the Zoo, Jars of Clay released a rarities collection named The White Elephant Sessions. This collection included the instrumental version of "Frail" from the original demo album.

Most recently, the band re-recorded the song in 2003 for the studio portion of their 2-disc studio/live album Furthermore: From the Studio, From the Stage. Like most of the studio recordings for the album, "Frail" was a re-recorded, rearranged version. However, it was the first to change key: All previous recordings of the song have been in E minor, but this version was transposed to the key of G minor. It also contained a very brief introduction unique to this recording.

== Personnel ==
This personnel section pertains to the Much Afraid version of the song. The personnel may vary from version to version.

=== Jars of Clay ===
- Dan Haseltine - vocals
- Stephen Mason - guitars and backing vocals
- Matt Odmark - guitars and backing vocals
- Charlie Lowell - keyboards and backing vocals

=== Additional musicians ===
- Greg Wells - drums, bass guitar
- Kate St. John - English horn

=== Production personnel ===
- Stephen Lipson - producer
- Robert Beeson - executive producer
- Heff Moraes - engineer and mixer
- Chuck Linder - assistant engineer
- Stephen Marcussen - mastering
- Don C. Tyler - editing
