= Miri (disambiguation) =

Miri is a city in northern Sarawak, Malaysia, on the island of Borneo.

Miri or MIRI may also refer to:

== Geography ==
=== Sarawak ===
- Miri (federal constituency), in Sarawak, Malaysia, represented in the Dewan Rakyat
- Miri (state constituency), defunct constituency formerly represented in the Sarawak State Legislative Assembly (1969–91)
- Miri District, an administrative district in Miri Division, Sarawak, Malaysia
- Miri Division, Sarawak, Malaysia

=== Others ===
- Miri, India, a village, List of villages in Pathardi taluka, in Pathardi taluka, Ahmednagar district, Maharashtra State, India
- Miri-ye Khani-ye Do, a village in Kerman Province, Iran.
- Miray, also spelled Miri, Afghanistan
- Miri, Indonesia, a subdistrict in Sragen Regency, Central Java

== People ==
=== Surname ===
- Angela Miri (born 1959), Nigerian academic and poet
- Maziar Miri, Iranian filmmaker
- Mrinal Miri, Indian philosopher and educationalist
- Seyed Javad Miri, Iranian sociologist

=== Given name ===
- Miri Aloni, Israeli folk-singer.
- Miri Ben-Ari, classically trained violinist known primarily for her work on several hip-hop projects
- Miri Bohadana, Israeli actress, model and presenter.
- Miri Eisin, Colonel of the Israeli Army with a background in political science
- Miri Fabian, Israeli actress
- Miri Gold, American-Israeli rabbi
- Miri Ichika, Japanese gravure idol, tarento, and actress
- Miri Mesika, Israeli singer and actress
- Miri Regev, Israeli politician
- Miri Rubin, medievalist at Queen Mary, University of London
- Miri Yu, Zainichi Korean playwright, novelist, and essayist

== Peoples ==
- Mising people (Plains Miri), a people of Arunachal Pradesh, India
  - Mishing language, their Sino-Tibetan language
- Hill Miri people, a tribal people of Arunachal Pradesh, India
  - Hill Miri language, their Sino-Tibetan language

== Crime syndicate ==
- Miri-Clan, German crime syndicate run by a Lebanese clan

== Technology ==
- Machine Intelligence Research Institute
- MIRI (Mid-Infrared Instrument), part of the James Webb Space Telescope

== Other ==
- "Miri" (Star Trek: The Original Series), a first season episode of Star Trek: The Original Series
- Miri language (disambiguation)
- Mising (disambiguation)
- Miri piri in Sikhism
