= Gregor McLennan =

British sociologist (1952–2026)

Gregor McLennan FAcSS
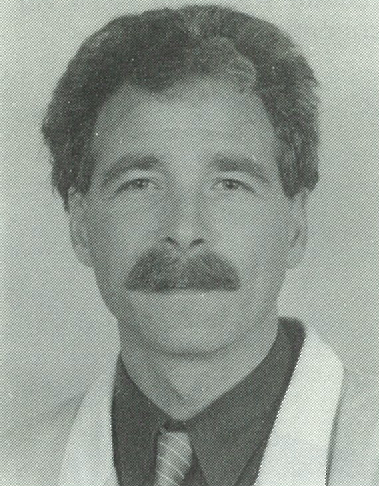
- McLennan in 1991
- Born: 21 October 1952
- Died: June 2026 (aged 73); Snowdonia, Wales
- Education: University of Birmingham (PhD), Bristol University (BA)
- Known for: Work on postcolonial and postsecular social theory
- Scientific career
- Fields: Social theory, ideology and politics, philosophy of social sciences
- Workplaces: Massey University; Bristol University
- Academic advisors: Stuart Hall
- Doctoral students: Seyed Javad Miri

Gregor McLennan (21 October 1952 – June 2026) was a British sociologist and a Fellow of the Academy of Social Sciences.

== Early life and career ==
Gregor McLennan was born on 21 October 1952. He studied under Stuart Hall at the Birmingham Centre for Contemporary Cultural Studies in the 1970s and continued to work with Hall at the Open University during the 1980s, co-editing several key texts on politics, ideology and crime. From 1991 to 1997 he was Head of the Department of Sociology at Massey University. In 1997 he assumed the Established Chair in Sociology at the University of Bristol, where he was also Director of the Institute of Advanced Studies. He was professor emeritus.

McLennan was known for his works on postcolonialism and postsecularism. He was also a Trustee of the Stuart Hall Foundation and edited Hall's Selected Writings on Marxism for Duke University Press in 2021.

== Disappearance and death ==
McLennan was last seen hiking in Eryri on 25 June 2026 during a record-breaking heatwave. The following day, mountain rescue teams and other agencies began searching for McLennan. His body was found on the mountain Carnedd Y Filiast on 29 June 2026.

== Books ==
Authored:

- Marxism and the Methodologies of History (1981)
- Marxism, Pluralism and Beyond (1989)
- Pluralism (1995)
- Sociological Cultural Studies: Reflexivity and Positivity in the Human Sciences (2006)
- Exploring Society (3rd edition 2010 – co-authored)
- Story of Sociology (2011)

Edited or co-edited:

- On Ideology (1978)
- Making Histories (1982)
- Crime and Society: Readings in History and Theory (1982)
- State and Society in Contemporary Britain (1984)
- The Idea of the Modern State (1984)
