= Live Monsters =

Live Monsters may refer to:

- Live Monsters (EP), 2007 live EP by Jars of Clay
- Live Monsters (video), 2004 DVD concert release by Dave Gahan
- Live Monsters, 1998 live album by Big Head Todd and the Monsters
