= WOW 1998 =

Compilation album by various artists
- Released: November 4, 1997
- Genre: Contemporary Christian music
- Label: EMI Christian Music Group
- Producer: Various

Various artists chronology
WOW 1997 (1996)	WOW 1998 (1997)	WOW 1999 (1998)

Professional ratings
Review scores
Source	Rating
Allmusic	4/5 stars

WOW 1998 is a compilation album of 30 contemporary Christian music hits which was released on November 4, 1997. WOW 1998 peaked at chart position 52 on the Billboard 200 in 1997, and also at No. 2 on the Top Contemporary Christian album chart. The album was certified platinum by the Recording Industry Association of America (RIAA) in 1998. It was certified as gold in Canada in 1999 by the Canadian Recording Industry Association

== Track listing ==
=== Disc one (Red) ===
1. "Overjoyed" – Jars of Clay
2. "Colored People" – dc Talk
3. "Hope to Carry On" – Caedmon's Call
4. "Abba (Father)" – Rebecca St. James
5. "My Hope Is You" – Third Day
6. "Missing Person" – Michael W. Smith
7. "Man of God" – Audio Adrenaline
8. "Disappear" – Out of the Grey
9. "Mission 3:16" – Carman
10. "Reality" – Newsboys
11. "We Can Make a Difference" – Jaci Velasquez
12. "People Get Ready... Jesus Is Comin'" – Crystal Lewis
13. "Saving the World" – Clay Crosse
14. "We Need Jesus" – Petra
15. "More Than You Know" – Out of Eden

=== Disc two (Black) ===
1. "Let Us Pray" – Steven Curtis Chapman
2. "Circle of Friends" – Point of Grace
3. "On My Way to Paradise" – Bob Carlisle
4. "Carry You" – Amy Grant (previously unreleased track from Behind the Eyes)
5. "The Measure of a Man" – 4Him
6. "Give It Up" – Avalon
7. "I Call Him Love" – Kathy Troccoli
8. "Adore You" – Anointed
9. "Just One" – Phillips, Craig and Dean
10. "Up Where We Belong" – BeBe & CeCe
11. "You Move Me" – Susan Ashton
12. "Breathe On Me" – Sandi Patty
13. "One of Two" – Gary Chapman
14. "A Whisper Heard Around the World" – Bryan Duncan
15. "My Utmost for His Highest" – Twila Paris

== Certifications ==
Region	Certification	Certified units/sales
Canada (Music Canada)	Gold	50,000^{^}
United States (RIAA)	Platinum	1,000,000^{^}
^{^} Shipments figures based on certification alone.
