= Disappearing =

Disappearing may refer to:

- "Disappearing" (The Sinceros song), from the 1981 album Pet Rock
- "Disappearing", a 2013 song by musician Dan Wilson
- "Disappearing", by The War on Drugs from the 2014 album Lost in the Dream
- "Disappearing", a 2017 episode of the Korean series My Only Love Song

== See also ==
- Disappear (disambiguation)
- Disappearance (disambiguation)
- Disappeared (disambiguation)
