= Furthermore: From the Studio, from the Stage =

Studio album by Jars of Clay
- Released: February 4, 2003
- Recorded: 2002–2003
- Genre: Christian rock, acoustic
- Length: 91:06
- Label: Essential
- Producer: Jars of Clay

Jars of Clay chronology
11Live: Jars of Clay In Concert (2002)	Furthermore: From the Studio, from the Stage (2003)	Who We Are Instead (2003)

Singles from Furthermore
- 1. "The Valley Song (Sing of Your Mercy)" Released: 2002

Professional ratings
Review scores
Source	Rating
Allmusic	4/5 stars
Cross Rhythms	6/10 stars
Jesus Freak Hideout	4.5/5 stars

Furthermore: From the Studio, from the Stage is the fifth album of Christian band Jars of Clay. It was released in 2003 by Essential Records. The album consists of two discs, one containing a live performance, and the other featuring re-recorded versions of songs from previous albums and three songs not previously on Jars of Clay albums.

== History ==
Furthermore was conceived as an alternative means of putting out a greatest hits project. The band chose to re-release a number of their most popular songs in re-recorded acoustic versions (disc one) and live versions (disc two). The only song to appear twice is "The Eleventh Hour", the title track of the prior album, and it appears as track five on both studio and stage discs.

The first disc also features three new songs: "The Valley Song (Sing Of Your Mercy)", a cover of "Dig" (originally by pioneering Christian alternative band Adam Again), and "Redemption". "Needful Hands" was not from one of the group's albums; they recorded it in 1998 for the worship collection Exodus.

The second disc featured audio of most of the songs from the group's DVD, 11Live: Jars of Clay In Concert, which documented their tour for The Eleventh Hour. All of the songs on this disc originally appeared on the band's first four albums, except for "This Road", which comes from the first of a series of multi-artist worship albums called City on a Hill.

== Charts and certifications ==
Release year	The Billboard 200	RIAA certification
2003	64	Gold

== Track listing ==
=== Disc One (From the Studio) ===
1. "Overjoyed" - 3:40
2. "Something Beautiful" - 3:57
3. "The Valley Song (Sing Of Your Mercy)" - 4:11
4. "Liquid" - 3:38
5. "The Eleventh Hour" - 4:09
6. "Dig" (Adam Again cover) - 3:14
7. "Redemption" - 3:10
8. "Love Song for a Savior" - 4:49
9. "Frail" - 4:15
10. "Needful Hands" - 2:47

=== Disc Two (From the Stage) ===
1. "Disappear" - 4:41
2. "Like a Child" - 4:43
3. "Crazy Times" - 3:56
4. "I Need You" - 3:35
5. "The Eleventh Hour" - 4:18
6. "This Road" - 4:29
7. "Fly" - 3:46
8. "I'm Alright" - 5:14
9. "Revolution" - 3:43
10. "Flood" - 3:59
11. "Worlds Apart" - 10:52
