= Disappearance =

Disappearance may refer to:

- Forced disappearance, when an organization forces a person to vanish from public view

== Books ==
- Disappearance (Trifonov novel), published posthumously in 1987
- Disappearance, 1993 novel by Guyanese writer David Dabydeen
- Disappearance (Watson novel), a young adult novel by Jude Watson
- The Disappearance, a fantasy novel by Philip Wylie
- The Wide Window: or, Disappearance!, a special edition of the novel The Wide Window by Lemony Snicket
- The Book of Disappearance, a 2014 Arabic novel by Ibtisam Azem

== Film and television ==
- The Disappearance (film), a 1977 British-Canadian film directed by Stuart Cooper
- Disappearance (2002 film), an American television film directed by Walter Klenhard
- Disappearances (film), a 2006 American film directed by Jay Craven
- Disappearance (2017 Dutch film), a film directed by Boudewijn Koole
- Disappearance (2017 Iranian film), a film directed by Ali Asgari
- The Disappearance (2015 TV series), a French TV series, originally titled Disparue
- The Disappearance (2017 TV series), a Canadian TV series
- Disappearance, a 2018 Egyptian TV series starring Nelly Karim
- "Disappearance" (Dynasty), a 1984 episode of the television series Dynasty

== See also ==
- Lists of people who disappeared
- List of missing ships
- Missing person
- Disappear (disambiguation)
- Disappeared (disambiguation)
- Disappearing (disambiguation)
