= Mising =

Mising or Mishing may refer to:

- Mising people, of northeastern India
- Mising language, their Sino Tibetan language

== See also ==
- Miri (disambiguation), another name of the people and language
- Missing (disambiguation)
