= WOW 1999 =

Compilation album by various artists
- Released: October 20, 1998
- Genre: Contemporary Christian music
- Label: EMI Christian Music Group
- Producer: Various

Various artists chronology
WOW 1998 (1997)	WOW 1999 (1998)	WOW 2000 (1999)

Professional ratings
Review scores
Source	Rating
Allmusic	4.5/5 stars

WOW 1999 is a compilation album of 30 contemporary Christian music hits that was released on October 20, 1998. It also featured three bonus tracks from new artists. WOW 1999 peaked at the 51st position on the Billboard 200 chart in 1998, and 2nd place on the Top Contemporary Christian album chart. In 2000 it reached No. 21 on the Top Contemporary Christian chart. The album was certified as double platinum in the year 2000 by the Recording Industry Association of America (RIAA). It was certified as gold in Canada in 1999 by the Canadian Recording Industry Association.

== Track listing ==
=== Green disc ===
1. "Into Jesus" – dc Talk
2. "Entertaining Angels" – Newsboys
3. "Crazy Times" – Jars of Clay
4. "Love Me Good" – Michael W. Smith
5. "Undo Me" – Jennifer Knapp
6. "Deeper" – Delirious?
7. "Pray" (Radio Edit) – Rebecca St. James
8. "The Devil Is Bad" – The W's
9. "If You Really Knew" – Out of Eden
10. "Agnus Dei" – Third Day
11. "Anything Genuine" – Smalltown Poets
12. "Little Man" – Supertones
13. "Chevette" (Remix) – Audio Adrenaline
14. "What Would Jesus Do?" – Big Tent Revival
15. "His Cheeseburger" – VeggieTales
16. "To Know You" – Nichole Nordeman

"Hard To Get" – Rich Mullins [hidden track within previous track]

=== Silver disc ===
1. "Steady On" – Point of Grace
2. "God So Loved" – Jaci Velasquez
3. "Testify to Love" – Avalon
4. "I Will Not Go Quietly" – Steven Curtis Chapman
5. "Can't Get Past the Evidence" – 4Him
6. "Somewhere Down the Road" – Amy Grant
7. "Lord I Believe In You" (Remix) – Crystal Lewis
8. "That Where I Am, There You May Also Be" – Rich Mullins
9. "In the Hands of Jesus" – Bob Carlisle
10. "Healing Waters" – Michelle Tumes
11. "The Power of a Moment" – Chris Rice
12. "He Will Make a Way" – Kathy Troccoli
13. "Strollin' On the Water" – Bryan Duncan
14. "Never Be" – Carman
15. "The Light on the Hill" – Máire Brennan
16. "There Is a God" – Natalie Grant
17. "Lord of Eternity" – Fernando Ortega

== Certifications ==
Region	Certification	Certified units/sales
Canada (Music Canada)	Gold	50,000^{^}
United States (RIAA)	2× Platinum	2,000,000^{^}
^{^} Shipments figures based on certification alone.
