= Desecularization =

Proliferation or growth of religion

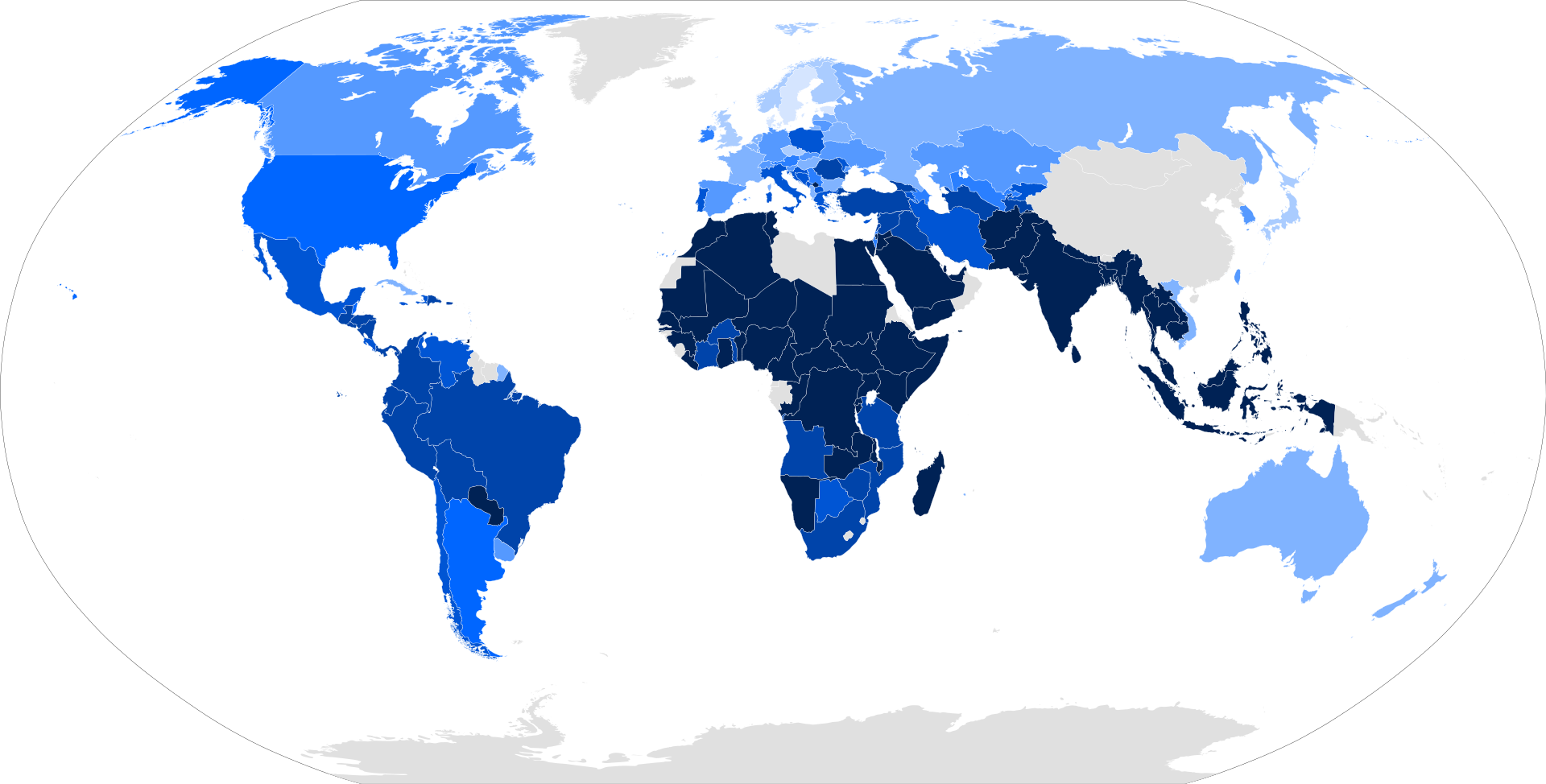
Importance of religion by country in a 2008-2009 poll by Gallup.

In sociology, desecularization (also spelled desecularisation) is a resurgence or growth of religion after a period of secularization. The theory of desecularization is a reaction to the theory known as the secularization thesis, which posits a gradual decline in the importance of religion and in religious belief itself, as a universal feature of modern society. The term desecularization was coined by Peter L. Berger, a former proponent of the secularization thesis, in his 1999 book The Desecularization of the World.

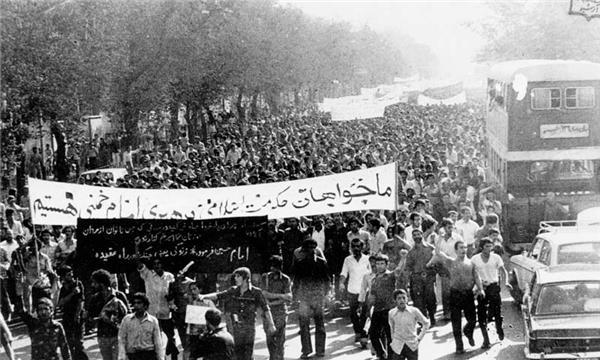
Demonstration during the Iranian Revolution. The banner reads: We want an Islamic government, led by Imam Khomeini.

Proponents of the theory of desecularization point to examples such as the Islamic revival since the 1970s, in particular the Iranian Revolution, the resurgence of religion in Russia and China, where governments had practiced state atheism, and the growing Christian population in the Global South. Berger also cited the rise of evangelical Christianity in the United States and elsewhere, rising religiosity in Hinduism, Sikhism and Buddhism, and the prevalence of religious conflict as evidence of the continued relevance of religion in the modern world. He claimed that the world today "is as furiously religious as it ever was".

Berger has recognized that his original description of desecularization was overly broad. Desecularization refers primarily to a resurgence in a single country or region, rather than mere persistence or a global trend. Some researchers speculated that people with religious beliefs could grow as a share of world population, due to higher fertility rates in poorer, more religious countries, and among religious believers, but Pew Research Center estimates that between 2010 and 2020, the religiously unaffiliated share increased from 23.3% to 24.2%. According to Pippa Norris and Ronald Inglehart, "virtually all advanced industrial societies" have become more secular in recent decades, and Pew notes that economic development is positively correlated with irreligiousness. Vyacheslav Karpov states that secularization and desecularization are not mutually exclusive, but rather involve an interplay between the two phenomena. Global studies show that many people who do not identify with a religion, still hold religious beliefs and participate in religious practices, thus complicating the situation.

== Secularization theories ==
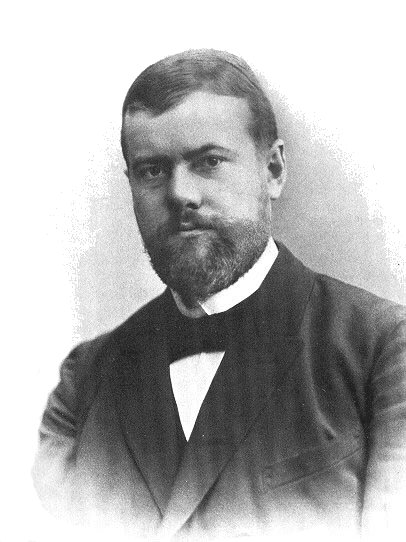
Max Weber

Many scholars of the 19th century posited that the world was undergoing a process of secularization. Individuals such as Emile Durkheim, Max Weber, Karl Marx, and Sigmund Freud believed that this trend would continue until religion became essentially insignificant in the public sphere. At the least it was believed that religion would become "privatized." The secularization thesis was underscored by rationalism, an argument born from the Age of Enlightenment.

=== Demand-side and supply-side theories ===
According to Norris and Inglehart, the traditional view of 19th century secularization can be divided into two perspectives: demand-side theories and supply-side theories. They take the view that "although the original theory of secularization was flawed in certain regards, it was correct in the demand-side perspective".

Demand-side theories assert that secularization occurs "bottom up," such that as a whole, the general population will become increasingly rational independent of any influence from the secular government or religious leadership body.

Examples of demand-side theories can be found in the accounts given by Weber and Durkheim. Whilst Weber rarely used the term "secularization," he is generally given credit for alluding to the idea that religion was gradually losing its prominence in society. According to Weber, the world was initially seen as unified, with religion, politics and economics all existing on the same social plane. Thus the term "religion" was not necessary nor was it widely used because religion was included in all aspects of life. According to Weber, when different aspects of society such as politics and economics were severed from religion, the demise of religion in the public sphere became inevitable.

Supply-side theories of secularization argue that the demand for religion exerted by the general population remains constant. This means that any change in the religious landscape occurs as a result of the manipulation of the "supply market" by religious leaders. The construction therefore views the phenomenon as 'top down' development. Steve Bruce argues that the "supply" of religion is greatest when there is a "free" and "competitive" market for "providers" of religion, as in most Western nations, as opposed to states where one religion predominates.

=== Diversity ===
Secularization is itself complex and not unidirectional since there are many types of secularization and most do not lead to atheism, irreligion, nor are they automatically antithetical to religion. Global studies show that many people who do not identify with a religion, still hold religious beliefs and participate in religious practices, thus complicating the situation.

== Desecularization theories ==
=== Terminology and definition ===
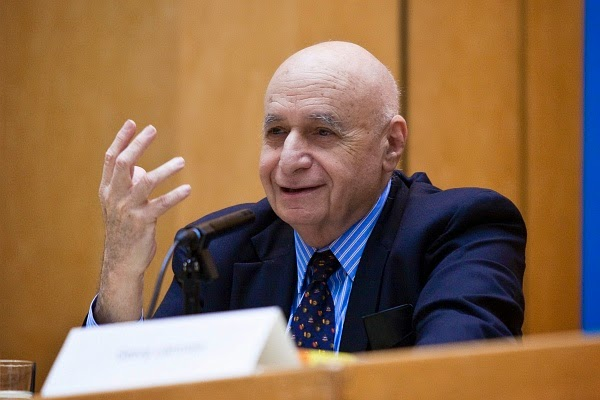
Peter L. Berger

The term desecularization appears in the title of Peter L. Berger's seminal 1999 book The Desecularization of the World: Resurgent Religion and World Politics. According to Vyacheslav Karpov, the term has received little analysis in the field of sociology, however this section will refer to at least one significant development in the term's definition since its first use.

In that book, Berger argued that secularization theory has been "falsified", though in a 2015 article said that it "was not completely mistaken". He acknowledges that his original use of the term, referring merely to "the continuing strong presence of religion in the modern world", was "a bit sloppy". Karpov has since developed the definition of the term, which Berger subsequently affirmed. Karpov defines the term as referring to a phenomenon that is counter-secularization and thus is reactionary to a prior period of secularism. He states that desecularization can be defined as "the growth of religion's societal influence," but only if it develops in response to "previously secularizing trends." Therefore, Karpov's development of the term essentially limited the definition to instances where religion was actively re-established as opposed to simply a state of continuity.

=== Methodological concerns ===
Some scholars raise the issue of evidence. Karpov for example, mounts a discussion on the different analytics that can be used in providing evidence for desecularizing trends. He divides these analytics into two different types of evidence, (1) societal-level data or "macro-data" and (2) non-societal data, named in Karpov's article as "mega data." Macro-data deals with evidence obtained from individual societal "units." These units cannot exclusively be referred to as countries or nation-states because sometimes they can represent smaller sections, i.e. racial groups. Other data ("mega-data") is less objective according to Karpov, because it often refers to trends in more abstract terms such as in "modern society" or civilization generally. Essentially, mega-data attempts to identify patterns on a more cosmic or global scale, whereas macro data can be very specific to nations, cities and racial groups such as church attendance and census results.

Because the term "desecularization" has been used to describe a global trend, the question raised by Karpov is whether macro-data analytics can be considered as valid when they indicate specific trends in "societal units," rather than global trends. There are two primary critiques of macro analytics: (1) that it leads to "methodological nationalism," causing a fixation on nation-states rather than broader civilization. The next argument is that of (2) temporal limitation – the concern that because our current concept of "society" is relatively recent, a focus on societal-level analytics (macro data) restricts sociological analysis to modernity and no other time period. According to Karpov this poses an issue when considering religions with ancient historical trajectories.

Karpov also cites several implications that result from using "mega" analytics, overall suggesting that it can allow for an understanding of desecularization that is rooted both in its historical trajectory, and its presence in modernity. He concludes that whilst "macro" data can limit the analysis of desecularization, it can be compounded and used in conjunction with "mega" analytics to give sociologists a clear overall picture of a religious trend.

== Examples ==
=== Changes in religious share of world population ===
The Center for the Study of Global Christianity at Gordon–Conwell Theological Seminary estimates that the number of atheists and agnostics increased from just 3.26 million worldwide in 1900, to 708 million in 1970, or 19.2% of world population, subsequently contracting as a population share to 12.7% by 2000. In 2006, sociologist Phil Zuckerman said that the atheist share of global population may be in decline, but that it is hard to predict future trends, due rapid secularisation in rich countries occurring alongside higher birth rates in religious countries. In 2025, Pew Research Center estimated that between 2010 and 2020, the religiously unaffiliated (atheists, agnostics and other people who do not affiliate with any religion) had increased from 23.3% of the world population to 24.2%.

In their 2015 study The Future of World Religions: Population Growth Projections, 2010–2050, Pew Research Center predicted that the religiously unaffiliated could decrease from 16.4% of the world population in 2010, to 13.2% by 2050, despite increasing in Europe and North America. The study explicitly made no attempt to account for how religious identification may be affected by changes in a country's economic development, political governance, urbanization and education. Its projections were based on demographic trends, such as birth rate and life expectancy, and the existing levels of religious switching at that time. By 2025, Pew had revised their estimate for the unaffiliated share in 2010 upwards to 23.3%, based on new data and new approaches to religious categorization, particularly in China.

As part of their 2015 forecast, Pew predicted that the religiously unaffiliated in Latin America would increase by just one percentage point, to 8.7% by 2050. In contrast, according to Latinobarómetro, the share of irreligious people in Latin America has increased from 4% in 1996 to 16% by 2020. The study also predicted that between 2010 and 2050, the irreligious share in the Middle East and North Africa would remain under 1%, and in Europe would increase by only 4.5 percentage points, from 18.8% to 23.3%. The study predicted that in the US the unaffiliated would rise from 16.4% in 2010 to 25.6% in 2050. Conrad Hackett, associate director of research at Pew, believes this forecast to be an underestimate, and a more detailed US-specific Pew study from 2022 estimated that the unaffiliated had reached 30% in the US by 2020 and, accounting for observed acceleration of religious switching, would increase to 42% by 2050, in the "most plausible" scenario.

The Center for the Study of Global Christianity, a partner of Pew Research Center, estimated in 2025 that the atheist and agnostic share of world population decreased from 12.7% in 2000 to 11.1% in 2025, and forecast that it would decrease to 8.9% in 2050. This was an increase from the 2015 CSGC forecasts, which had been 10.3% for 2025 and 8.5% for 2050. The CSGC uses a similar methodology as Pew, but uses self-reported data from religious communities in addition to censuses and survey data.

In 2025, Pew Research Center estimated that between 2010 and 2020, the religiously unaffiliated share of world population had increased slightly to 24.2% (from 23.3%), including 32.8% in the Asia–Pacific (decreasing marginally from 33.0%), 30.2% in North America (increasing from 17.2%), 25.3% in Europe (increasing from 18.7%), 11.9% in Latin America and the Caribbean (increasing from 7.8%), 2.6% in Sub-Saharan Africa (decreasing from 3.1%) and 0.4% in the Middle East and North Africa (stable from 0.4%). The unaffiliated share grew by at least 5 percentage points in 35 countries (shrinking by this margin in none), compared to three for Islam (and two where it decreased), and one for Christianity (and 40 where it decreased). The authors note that economic development (as measured by the Human Development Index) is positively correlated with irreligiousness.

In 2012, conservative academic Eric Kaufmann, who specializes in politics, religion and demography, wrote:

In my book, Shall the Religious Inherit the Earth?: Demography and Politics in the Twenty-First Century, I argue that 97% of the world's population growth is taking place in the developing world, where 95% of people are religious. On the other hand, the secular West and East Asia have very low fertility and rapidly aging populations. The demographic disparity between the religious, growing global South and the aging, secular global North will peak around 2050. In the coming decades, the developed world's demand for workers to pay its pensions and work in its service sector will soar alongside the booming supply of young people in the third world. Ergo, we can expect significant immigration to the secular West which will import religious revival on the back of ethnic change. In addition, those with religious beliefs tend to have higher birth rates than the secular population, with fundamentalists having far larger families. The epicentre of these trends will be in immigration gateway cities like New York (a third white), Amsterdam (half Dutch), Los Angeles (28% white), and London, 45% white British.

=== United States ===
The United States was long seen as an exception to the secularization thesis as it applied to the developed world. Pew Research Center estimated that the share of religiously unaffiliated Americans had increased from 5% in 1972 to 30% in 2022, rising rapidly since 2005, and predicted that in the "most plausible" scenario this would increase to 42% by 2050. In 2024, Pew found that 69% of the "nones" (the religiously unaffiliated) believe in God or a higher power. According to Gallup, belief in God decreased from 98% in 1967, to 81% in 2022. For those aged 18–29, it was 68%. In 2023, Pew found that 54% of Americans believe in God "as described in the Bible", 34% in "a higher power/spiritual force", and 10% in neither.

Roger Finke and Rodney Stark state that church adherence in the U.S. increased from 1776 to 2000, from an estimated 17% to 62% of the population. Finke and Stark argue that the religious landscape in the 20th and 21st centuries only appear to be fading in significance because traditional routes of religious worship are being replaced by new wave religiosity. They claim that populations in the modern world are moving away from traditional or established denominations such as Catholicism and participating in religious affairs in a more individualized sense. For example, they argue that the colonial period was not as religious as once thought, using church membership as an indicator of religiosity. Instead they suggest that the onset of globalization and religious pluralism is responsible for a higher proportion of church involvement when compared with the monolithic, traditional histories of the mainstream churches.

According to Gallup, church membership has fallen to 47% by 2020.

=== Russia ===
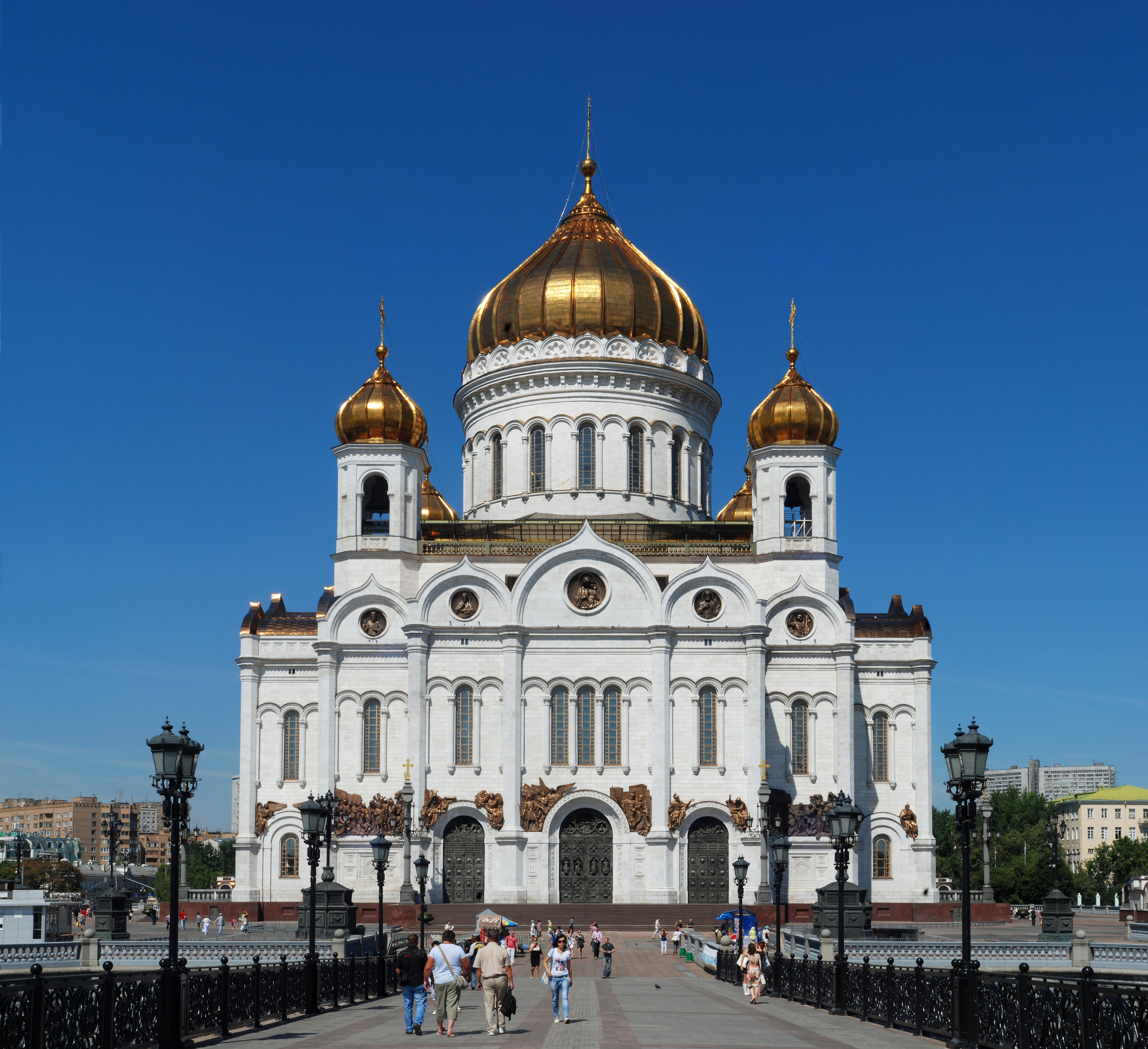
Cathedral of Christ the Saviour in Moscow, Russia

Christopher Marsh explains the secularization in Russia before the collapse of the Soviet Union, stating that the regime was underscored by "scientific atheism," which was ultimately manifested in the persecution of religious clergy in Russia throughout the duration of the regime. This secularization was indicated in the surveys conducted between 1981 and 1990, that showed a sharp decline in religious and supernatural beliefs, particularly in young people. In Lambert's study, 12 variables were used in the survey to denote religiosity, which included propensity to pray, belief in an afterlife, etc. Furthermore, in a study conducted by Evans and Northmore-Ball, 80 percent of individuals claimed to be Russian Orthodox in 2007, with only half of the population doing the same in 1993, immediately after the collapse of the Soviet Union. Both Berger and Karpov use this evidence to bolster their accounts of desecularization in the present.

A large number of missionaries presently operating in Russia are from Protestant denominations. According to a survey conducted at the end of 2013, 2% of surveyed Russians identify as Protestants or another branch of Christianity.

Although a large proportion of Russians identify as Orthodox Christians, less than 10 per cent attend religious services

=== Muslim world ===
Polling by Arab Barometer indicated that the share of people in the Arab world who said they were "not religious" increased from 8% in 2013 to 13% in 2019. The largest increases were in Tunisia and Libya, and the irreligious share decreased in Yemen. The countries with the highest non-religious shares were, in descending order: Tunisia, Libya, Algeria, Lebanon, Morocco, Egypt and Sudan – six out of seven being in North Africa – followed by lower shares in the Palestinian territories, Jordan, Iraq and Yemen. Between 2012 and 2022, Arab Barometer also recorded an increase in the share who believe that religious clerics should influence government decisions. The highest figures were in Iraq (54%) and Jordan (49%), and lower in Lebanon (22%) and Egypt (20%).

=== Western Europe ===
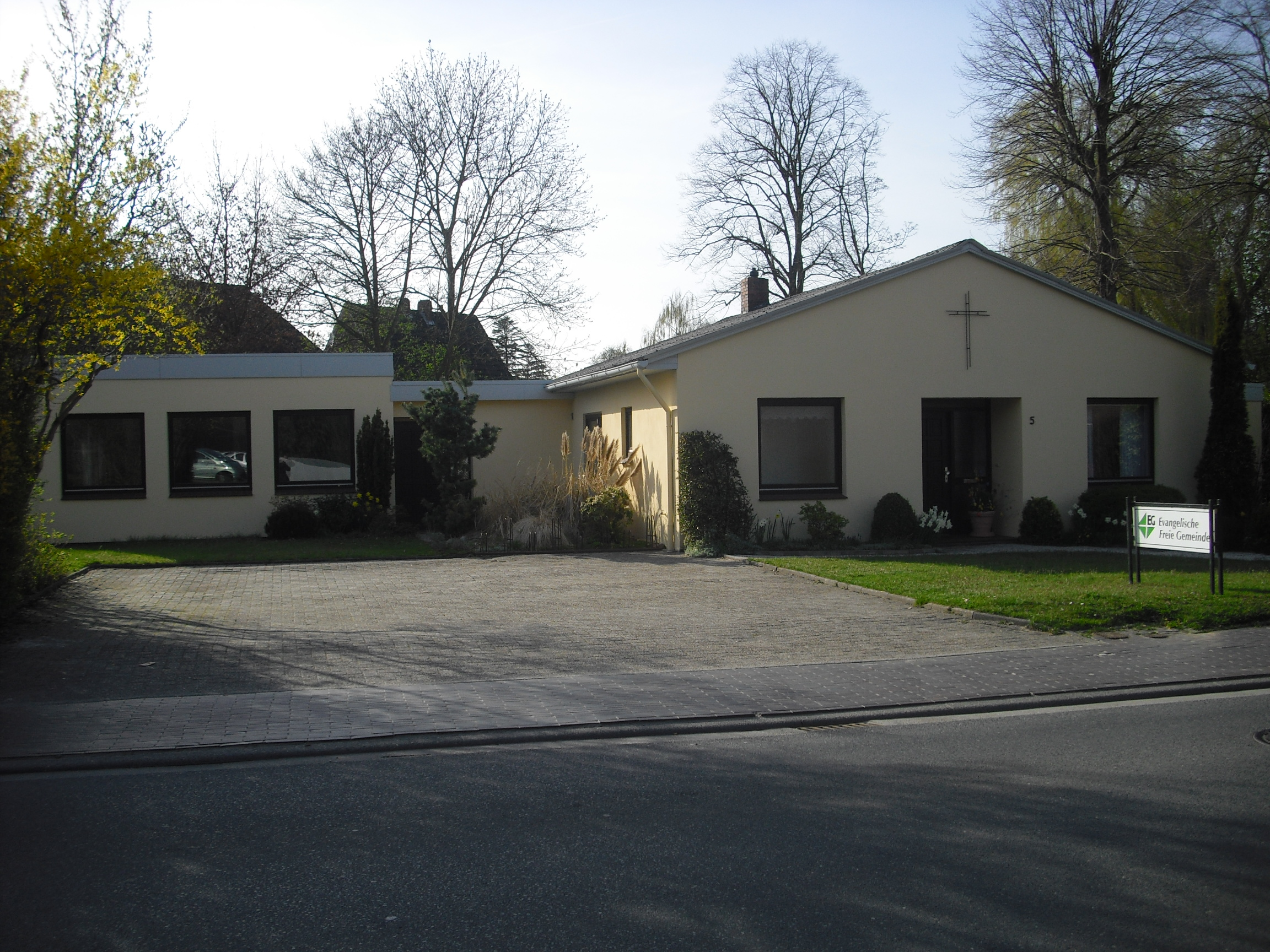
Evangelical Free Church Jever, district of Friesland, Lower Saxony, Germany

Most European countries have experienced a decline in church membership and church attendance.

Analysis of the results from the 2015 British Social Attitudes Survey suggests that the proportion of British people leaving the religion of their upbringing was between 37% and 44% for different denominations of Christianity, 14% for Jews, 10% for Muslims and Sikhs, and 6% for Hindus.

In 2014 Deutsche Welle reported that evangelical Christianity had doubled in Germany in the last 10 years. In 2022, Christian News Europe said that 200,000 people belonged to Pentecostal churches in Germany, including 64,807 members, up from 37,000 in 2002. 61% of these church communities are of German origin, and 39% of other languages and origins.

As of 2016, Muslims were 4.9% of the population of Europe (defined as the European Union and Switzerland, at the time including the UK). The largest Muslim communities were in France (8.8% of the population) and Germany (6.1%).

=== Latin America ===
According to Latinobarómetro, the share of irreligious people in Latin America quadrupled between 1996 and 2020, from 4% to 16%. However, the number of evangelical Christians increased at the same time, from 3.5% to 19%. The share of Catholics decreased from 80% to 56%.

=== East Asia ===
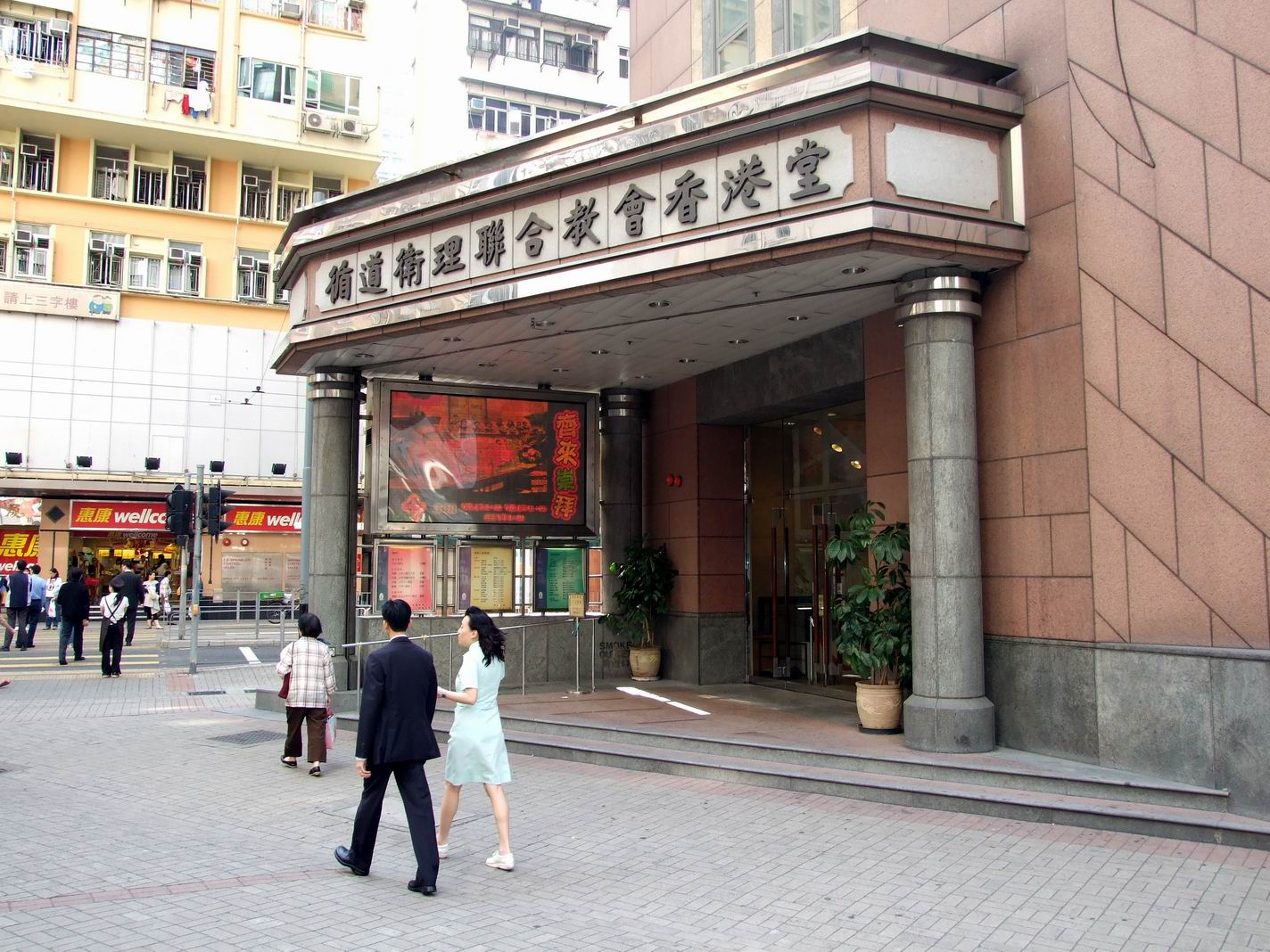
A Hong Kong Methodist church.

Pew Research Center estimate that despite China's official policy of state atheism, the number of Chinese Christians has significantly increased, from 4 million before 1949 to 67 million in 2010. However, recent evidence suggests that growth in Christianity has ceased.

Christianity grew in South Korea, from 2.0% in 1945 to 29.3% in 2010. Gallup put the share of Christians in Korea declining to 23% in 2021, with the irreligious rising to 60%.

Zeng discusses the increasingly religious paradigm within civil service entrance examinations – tests which are intended to sort applicants for civil service and "justify social hierarchy," as well as academic examinations for school and university. Zeng also found that in two separate non-academic shrines in Japan, more than half of the emas were directed toward such exams.

== Responses to the desecularization thesis ==
The conflicting secularization and desecularization theses and their application to modernity have occasioned much debate. Some 20th and 21st century scholars have argued that the Secularization Thesis is not nullified and that the term 'desecularization' can only be applied in isolated, societal circumstances. Bryan R. Wilson has suggested that commercialism continues to undermine religion in relation to religious bodies such as the Church, and non-religious bodies such as the family unit and economic institutions.

Critics of the contemporary theory of desecularization such as Wilson still concede that religiosity is not trending towards extinction because of continued religious piety across the globe. However, they do argue that its relationship with political and economic institutions is indeed declining because of the increased pressure from the scientific and technological spheres. They argue that this proposition is both plausible in modernity and compatible with 19th century conceptions of Secularization that foreshadowed religion's "privatization," if not extinction. Hence, critics of desecularization suggest that whilst it can account for some instances of continued and revised religiosity, it does not adequately describe the relationship between religion and privatized inquisitions and governments.

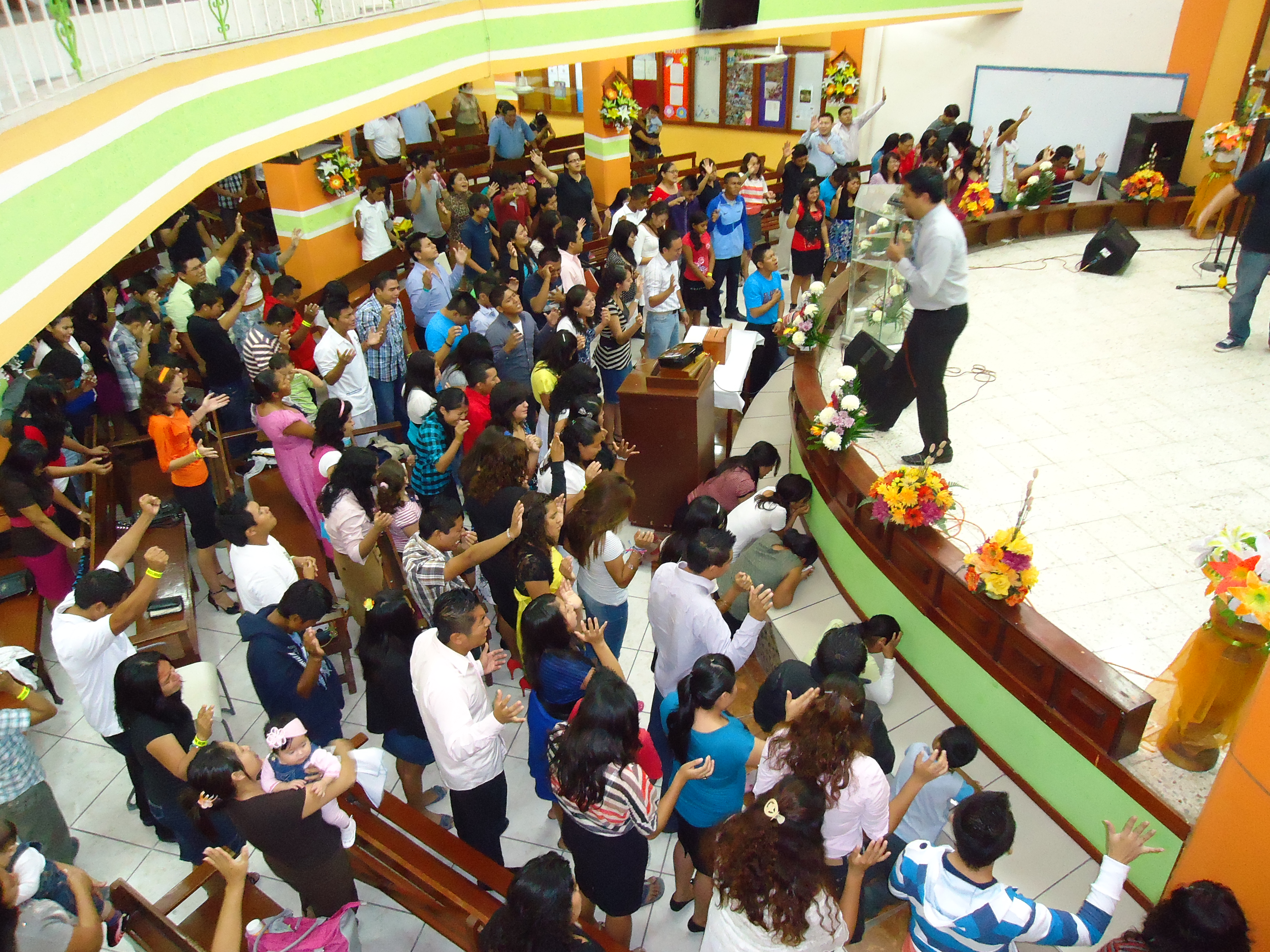
Worship service in Center of Faith Emmanuel of Assemblies of God in Cancun, Mexico. Prayers with the hands up and speaking in tongues.

Mouzelis suggests that this case is "strong," however it only refers to "inter-institutional" secularization (i.e. the relationship between religion and other institutions). He offers the opinion that the argument against desecularization becomes weakened when one considers "developments within the religious sphere proper," or what he calls "intra-institutional" secularization. Similarly, Martin uses evidence of increased Pentecostalism in both developed and non-developed countries (particularly the U.S.) to bolster the argument for desecularization. Bruce offers a rebuttal to this point, claiming that the United States is simply slower to become secular due to certain structural predispositions, namely the steady rate of migration.

Bruce also suggests that the dramatic changes to religiosity in the modern world such as increased liberalism, represent evidence of its decline. According to Bruce, this trajectory could have begun with the transition from medieval Catholicism to the Protestant reformation under Martin Luther. Mouzelis describes this as a potentially weak argument in that most proponents of desecularization would simply view events such as the Reformation as a religious development or the birth of a new type of Christianity, which could have the potential to further globalize its consumption.

Among these dramatic changes in religion, according to Bruce, is the deterioration of supernatural elements of religiosity, leaving behind a belief system that its more morally grounded a development which represents a "retardation" of religion. Again, Mouzelis takes a more objective stance, suggesting that this development can be seen as both evidence for and against desecularization because such movements can still capitulate the globalization of certain faiths.

Overall, critics of desecularization tend to argue that whilst religious enthusiasm is not necessarily in decline, the significance of religion in the public sphere, and as a limb of political and economic institutions, is indeed continually diminished by modernity. This can be described as the "privatization" of religion. However, desecularization proponents tend to suggest that these aforementioned changes represent religious developments rather than religious declines, and therefore cannot be used as evidence of general secularizing trend.

== See also ==
- Growth of religion
- Postsecularism
