= Miri language =

Miri language can refer to:

- Mishing language (Plains Miri), a Sino-Tibetan language of Arunachal Pradesh, India
- Hill Miri language, a Sino-Tibetan language of Arunachal Pradesh, India
- Miri language (Sudan), a Nilo-Saharan language of Sudan
- a dialect of the Narom language, an Austronesian language spoken in Sarawak, Malaysia

== See also ==
- Miri (disambiguation)
