= Disappear =

Disappear may refer to:

- "To disappear" someone (transitive verb), referring to forced disappearance.

== Music ==
- Disappear (album), or the title song, by T.S.O.L., 2001
- "Disappear" (Hoobastank song), 2005
- "Disappear" (INXS song), 1990
- "Disappear" (Motion City Soundtrack song), 2009
- "Disappear" (No Angels song), 2008
- "Disappear", by 8stops7 from Birth of a Cynic
- "Disappear", by Beyoncé from I Am... Sasha Fierce
- "Disappear", by Bullet for My Valentine from Scream Aim Fire
- "Disappear", by Dream Theater from Six Degrees of Inner Turbulence
- "Disappear", by Evanescence from Evanescence
- "Disappear", by Greenwheel from Soma Holiday
- "Disappear", by The Haunted from Unseen
- "Disappear", by Imminence from Heaven in Hiding
- "Disappear (Remember When)", by Issues from Issues
- "Disappear", by Jars of Clay from The Eleventh Hour
- "Disappear", by Letters to Cleo from Go!
- "Disappear", by Logan Henderson
- "Disappear", by Madness from Absolutely
- "Disappear", by Mazzy Star from Among My Swan
- "Disappear", by A Perfect Murder from Cease to Suffer
- "Disappear", by R.E.M. from Reveal
- "Disappear", by Screaming Jets from The Screaming Jets
- "Disappear", by the Sound of Arrows from Voyage
- "Disappear", by Starset from Horizons
- "Disappear", by Sunny Day Real Estate from The Rising Tide
- "Disappear", by Tonight Alive from Underworld
- "Disappear", from the 2015 stage musical Dear Evan Hansen
- "Disappear", by the Zutons from The Big Decider, 2024

== See also ==
- Disappearance (disambiguation)
- Disappeared (disambiguation)
- Disappearing (disambiguation)
- "Disappearer", a song by Sonic Youth from Goo
- "I Disappear", a song by Metallica
