= Crazy Times =

Single by Jars of Clay

from the album Much Afraid
- Released: 1997
- Recorded: 1997
- Genre: Alternative rock
- Length: 3:34
- Label: Essential
- Songwriter(s): Dan Haseltine; Stephen Mason; Mark Hudson; Greg Wells
- Producer(s): Stephen Lipson

Jars of Clay singles chronology
| "Worlds Apart" (1996) | "Crazy Times" (1997) | "Five Candles (You Were There)" (1997) |

Alternative covers
- US Maxi-Single

"Crazy Times" is a song recorded and performed by Jars of Clay. The song was a writing collaboration between the band members Dan Haseltine and Stephen Mason with songwriters Mark Hudson and Greg Wells. It was the first single from their second studio album, Much Afraid. The single fared well in the mainstream, peaking at No. 38 on the Billboard Modern Rock Tracks chart. The demo version of the song can be found on the album The White Elephant Sessions, while a live version of the song is included on the 2003 double album, Furthermore: From the Studio, From the Stage. This song also appears on the WOW 1999 compilation album.

== Track listing ==
=== US radio promo ===
1. "Crazy Times" (Album Version) – 3:34 (Dan Haseltine, Stephen Mason, Mark Hudson, & Greg Wells)

=== UK commercial single ===
1. "Crazy Times" – 3:34 (Dan Haseltine, Stephen Mason, Mark Hudson, & Greg Wells)
2. "The Chair" – 5:21 (Charlie Lowell, Dan Haseltine, Matt Odmark, & Stephen Mason)
3. "Weighed Down" – 3:39 (Charlie Lowell, Dan Haseltine, Matt Odmark, & Stephen Mason)

=== US maxi-single ===
1. "Crazy Times" – 3:37 (Dan Haseltine, Stephen Mason, Mark Hudson, & Greg Wells)
2. "The Chair" – 5:21 (Charlie Lowell, Dan Haseltine, Matt Odmark, & Stephen Mason)
3. "Frail" (from the original demo) – 4:05 (Charlie Lowell, Dan Haseltine, Matt Bronleewe, & Stephen Mason)
4. "Sleepers" – 1:51 (Charlie Lowell, Dan Haseltine, Matt Odmark, & Stephen Mason)

== Personnel ==
Performance

- Dan Haseltine – vocals
- Charlie Lowell – keyboards, piano, organ, background vocals
- Stephen Mason – guitars, bass guitar, background vocals
- Matt Odmark – guitars, background vocals
- Greg Wells – drums, percussion

Technical

- Stephen Lipson – producer
- Robert Beeson – executive producer
- Heff Moraes – engineering, mixing
- Chuck Linder – recording
- Mike Griffith – engineering
- Adam Hatley – engineering assistant
- Stephen Marcussen – mastering
- Don C. Tyler – digital editing

== Charts ==
- No. 1 Christian CHR
- No. 38 Billboard Modern Rock Tracks
