= Postsecularism =

Theories about the persistence or resurgence of religion

Postsecularism (also, postsecular turn) refers to a range of theories regarding the persistence or resurgence of religious beliefs or practices in the present. The "post-" may refer to after the end of secularism or after the beginning of secularism.

== Use ==
The term "postsecular" has been used in sociology, political theory, religious studies, art studies, literary studies, education and other fields. Jürgen Habermas is widely credited for popularizing the term, to refer to current times in which the idea of modernity is perceived as failing and, at times, morally unsuccessful, so that, rather than a stratification or separation, a new peaceful dialogue and tolerant coexistence between the spheres of faith and reason must be sought in order to learn mutually. In this sense, Habermas insists that both religious people and secularist people should not exclude each other, but to learn from one another and coexist tolerantly. Massimo Rosati says that in a post secular society, religious and secular perspectives are on even ground, meaning that the two theoretically share equal importance. Modern societies that have considered themselves fully secular until recently have to change their value systems accordingly as to properly accommodate this co-existence.

Charles Taylor's A Secular Age is also frequently invoked as describing the postsecular, though there is sometimes disagreement over what each author meant with the term. Particularly contested is the question of whether "postsecular" refers to a new sociological phenomenon or to a new awareness of an existing phenomenon—that is, whether society was secular and now is becoming post-secular or whether society was never and is not now becoming secular even though many people had thought it was or thought it was going to be. Some suggest that the term is so conflicted as to be of little use. Others suggest that the flexibility of the term is one of its strengths.

In literary studies, the term has been used to indicate a sort of postmodern religious or spiritual sensibility in certain contemporary texts.

== Related concept of desecularization ==
The term "desecularization" appears in the title of Peter L. Berger's seminal 1999 work The Desecularization of the World: Resurgent Religion and World Politics.

Berger explains that the assumption that the modern world is secular has been “falsified." Specifically, Berger maintained that "the assumption we live in a secularized world is false.... The world today is as furiously religious as it ever was."

However, for Titus Hjelm, professor of religious studies at the University of Helsinki: "Berger's concept of "desecularization" cannot be taken as a serious "countertheory" to secularization as long as it does not respond to the original theoretical formulations made in [Berger's 1967 book] The Sacred Canopy."

== See also ==
- Metamodernism
- Habermas' religious dialogue
- Church renewal
- Great Awakening
- Islamic revival and Islamization
- Islamism
- Neopaganism
- New Age
- New Atheism
- New Thought
- Postmodern religion
- Post-postmodernism
- Religious naturalism
- Secular religion
- Spiritual naturalism
- Transhumanism
