= Seyed Javad Miri =

Iranian sociologist

Seyed Javad Miri Meynagh
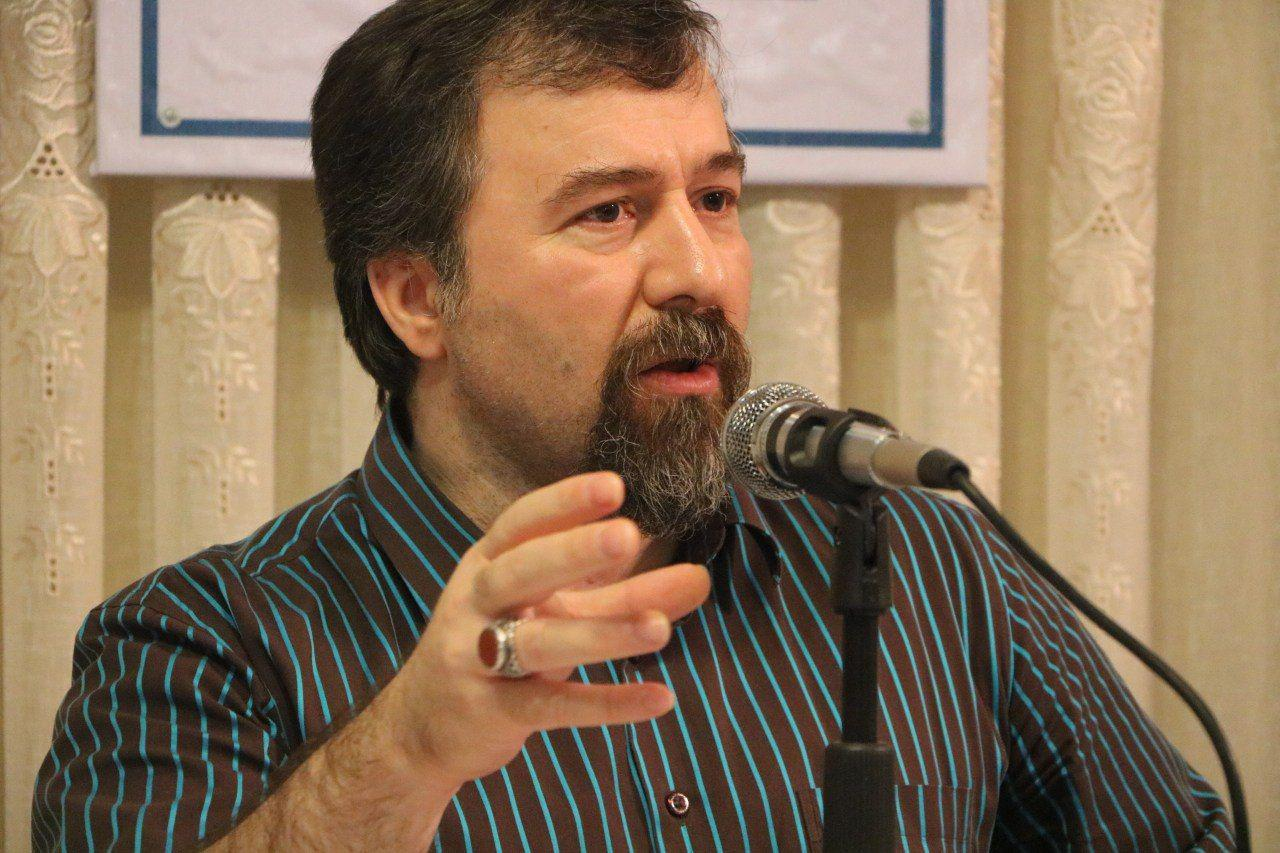
- Born: 1971 (age 54–55); Tabriz, Iran
- Education: Bristol University (PhD); University of Gothenburg (MA)
- Awards: CSN Scholarship
- Scientific career
- Fields: Social theory
- Workplaces: Institute for Humanities and Cultural Studies
- Thesis: Intercivilisational Social Theory: Complementarity and Contradiction in the Muslim and Western Intellectual Traditions (2005)
- Doctoral advisor: Gregor McLennan; Rohit Barot

Seyed Javad Miri Meynagh (Persian: جواد میری; born 1971) is a Swedish-Iranian sociologist. He is known for his expertise on social theory and Islamic thinkers.

== Books ==
- Islamism and Post-Islamism: Reflections upon Allama Jafari’s Political Thought, University Press of America, 2014
- Reimagining Malcolm X: Street Thinker versus Academic Thinker, University Press of America, 2015
- East and West: Allama Jafari on Bertrand Russell, University Press of America, 2013

=== Edited ===
- Orientalism: A Eurocentric Vision of the ‘Other’, International Peace Studies Center Press, 2013
- Reclaiming the Sane Society: Essays on Erich Fromm’s Thought, edited by Seyed Javad Miri, Robert Lake and Tricia M. Kress, Sense Publishers, 2014
- Malcolm X: From Political Eschatology to Religious Revolutionary, edited by Dustin J. Byrd and Seyed Javad Miri, Brill, 2016
- Ali Shariati and the Future of Social Theory: Religion, Revolution, and the Role of the Intellectual, edited by Dustin J. Byrd and Seyed Javad Miri, Brill, 2017
- Frantz Fanon and Social Theory: A View from the Wretched, edited by Dustin J. Byrd and Seyed Javad Miri, Brill, 2019
