= Miri Gold =

Israeli rabbi

Miri Gold (Hebrew: מירי גולד) is the first non-Orthodox rabbi in Israel to have her salary paid for by funds taken from taxpayers. She was born in Detroit, but in 1977 she immigrated to Kibbutz Gezer along with other North Americans. When the founder of the kibbutz's congregation (Kehilat Birkat Shalom) left, Gold began leading High Holidays services and preparing children for bat mitzvahs and bar mitzvahs. Gold entered the Reform movement's Hebrew Union College - Jewish Institute of Religion in 1994, and was ordained in 1999. At the time she was paid by the congregation, since the Israeli government did not recognize non-Orthodox rabbis. Gold petitioned the Israeli Supreme Court in 2005 to change this, and in 2012 a ruling by the Israeli attorney general granted her request.

In November 2024, Rabbi Gold was awarded a Doctor of Divinity honoris causa by Hebrew Union College – Jewish Institute of Religion, "for her work as a pioneering rabbi who conceived, founded, and built Birkat Shalom Congregation in Kibbutz Gezer, a groundbreaking model of state support and recognition of Reform Judaism in Israel".
