= The Eleventh Hour (Jars of Clay album) =

Studio album by Jars of Clay
- Released: March 5, 2002
- Recorded: 2001–02
- Genre: Alternative rock, pop
- Length: 42:26
- Label: Essential
- Producer: Jars of Clay

Jars of Clay chronology
| Jar of Gems (1999) | The Eleventh Hour (2002) | 11Live: Jars of Clay in Concert (2003) |

Singles from The Eleventh Hour
- 1. "I Need You" Released: 2002; 2. "Fly" Released: 2002; 3. "Revolution" Released: 2002; 4. "Whatever She Wants" Released: 2002

The Eleventh Hour is the fourth full-length studio album by the band Jars of Clay. It was released in 2002 by Essential Records and marked the band's first attempt at producing a full album by themselves.

== Background and production ==
When writing the group's fourth album, Jars of Clay enlisted Dennis Herring, who produced the band's If I Left the Zoo album, to produce, but due to scheduling difficulties, Herring decided to pull out of the project, leading to the band's first attempt at producing by themselves. Though not initially intending to produce the album themselves, the group took on this and many other aspects of putting the album together they had not before, such as artwork and even filming Ten:Thirty: The Making of The Eleventh Hour video.

The band stated that they took the same songwriting approach for "I Need You" as they did with "Love Song For A Savior" from their self-titled debut album. However, the music for "I Need You" was actually written during the If I Left the Zoo sessions.

"Fly" is based on the story of a couple fighting a losing battle against the wife's cancer. Specifically, it is about the moment at which her husband "lets her go". The unnamed couple were friends or close acquaintances of band members.

== Composition ==
The Eleventh Hour is considered a return to Jars of Clay's original sound, though in truth it bore stylistic similarities to all three of the albums preceding it, and continued the trend of favoring poetic lyrics over straightforwardly "Christian" lyrics (with lead single "I Need You" being a notable exception, reflecting a trend toward more direct and simplistic "worship songs" that had become popular in Christian music at around the start of the 21st century). The electric guitar was a more notable presence here than on past albums as well.

The song "Fly" had limited success at mainstream radio, but by this point, Jars of Clay was much less visible in mainstream music than they had been in the mid-nineties. The album was recorded in the band's own Sputnik Studio, and they self-produced it in addition to doing all of the photography and artwork on their own, even down to using the programs to design the cover. This was the first time that they had produced their own material since the self-titled album.

== Release ==
The album's tour was later recorded and released as a DVD known as 11Live, which featured the same cover artwork as The Eleventh Hour. Later, the group re-recorded many songs from the first four albums and released these studio sessions along with the live performances as Furthermore: From the Studio, From the Stage. "Something Beautiful" and "The Eleventh Hour" were the only songs from The Eleventh Hour that were included on the studio portion of the release, while "The Eleventh Hour" appeared a second time on the live performance (the only song to appear twice, on track five of each disc) and "Disappear", "I Need You", "Fly" and "Revolution". In 2007, the group parted from Essential Records and Sony BMG, Essential's parent company, decided to release a greatest hits collection as part of their The Essential series. The Essential Jars of Clay features four songs from The Eleventh Hour which are the singles "I Need You", "Fly" and "Revolution" and the album's track "Silence".

A live version of "I Need You" and "Fly" appear on the band's 2003 double album, Furthermore: From the Studio, From the Stage. "I Need You" also appears on the WOW Hits 2003 compilation album.

=== Album artwork ===
The album cover of The Eleventh Hour is a photograph of Seattle taken by Dan Haseltine from a hotel window looking down the Pike Place Market. All of the artwork was created jointly by the band, as the group wanted to put together an album that they had created, after being prompted to produce the album with the departure of Dennis Herring from the producer position before pre-production had begun.

== Critical reception ==
Professional ratings
Review scores
| Source | Rating |
|---|---|
| AllMusic | 4/5 stars |
| Christianity Today | 4.5/5 stars |
| Cross Rhythms | 10/10 stars |
| Entertainment Weekly | B− |
| Jesus Freak Hideout | 4/5 stars |
| Pitchfork | 7.0/10 |

Pitchfork praised the album's first single, "I Need You," exhibiting "the passion and intensity that Jars fans know and love, expressing a deep desire for God and harking of 'Love Song for a Savior'".

== Honors ==
- The Eleventh Hour earned the band a third consecutive Grammy Award in the Best Pop/Contemporary Gospel Album category in 2002.
- The Eleventh Hour won Best Modern Rock Album at 2003's Dove Awards.

== Track listing ==
All words and music written by Dan Haseltine, Charlie Lowell, Stephen Mason, and Matt Odmark.

1. "Disappear" – 3:56
2. "Something Beautiful" – 3:46
3. "Revolution" – 3:42
4. "Fly" – 3:20
5. "I Need You" – 3:40
6. "Silence" – 5:17
7. "Scarlet" – 3:32
8. "Whatever She Wants" – 3:43
9. "The Eleventh Hour" – 4:27
10. "These Ordinary Days" – 3:04
11. "The Edge of Water" – 3:54

== Personnel ==
Jars of Clay

- Dan Haseltine – vocals, percussion, tambourine
- Charlie Lowell – keyboards, accordion, backing vocals
- Stephen Mason – electric guitars, backing vocals
- Matt Odmark – acoustic guitars, backing vocals

Additional musicians

- Tab Laven – banjo (11)
- Aaron Sands – bass (1, 3–5, 7)
- Chris Donahue – bass (2, 8, 11)
- Joe Porter – drums (1, 3, 4, 7)
- Shawn McWilliams – drums (2, 5–11)
- John Catchings – cello (2, 6, 11)
- Fleming Painter – guest vocals (7)

Production

- Robert Beeson – executive producer
- Jars of Clay – producers, photography
- Vance Powell – engineer, recording
- Mitch Dane – recording (3), second engineer
- Jeremy Cottrell – second engineer
- Josh Williams – second engineer
- Sputnik Sound, Franklin, Tennessee – recording studio
- The Playground, Nashville, Tennessee – recording studio
- FrontPage Studios, Hollywood, California – recording studio
- Jack Joseph Puig – mixing at Ocean Way Recording, Hollywood, California
- Bob Ludwig – mastering at Gateway Mastering, Portland, Maine
- Dan Haseltine – art direction, cover concept
- Richie Edwards – design, layout
- Sam Shifley – photography
- Kristin Barlowe – back panel photography

== Charts ==
| Chart (2002) | Peak position |
|---|---|
| The Billboard 200 | 28 |
