= Live Monsters (EP) =

EP by Jars of Clay
- Released: September 4, 2007
- Recorded: 2007
- Genre: Christian rock
- Length: 34:09 (concert version); 33:06 (iTunes version)
- Label: Essential
- Producer: Jars of Clay

Jars of Clay chronology
Good Monsters (2006)	Live Monsters (2007)	The Essential Jars of Clay (2007)

Professional ratings
Review scores
Source	Rating
Allmusic	3.5/5 stars
Christian Today	4/5 stars
Jesus Freak Hideout	4.5/5 stars

Live Monsters is an EP recorded and released by Jars of Clay. The EP contains songs that were recorded live on their tour in support of their studio album, Good Monsters. At first release, the only method of purchasing the album was either at one of their concerts or through Jars Of Clay's official store. However, Essential has since released the EP for purchase through the iTunes Store and was released to mainstream music stores on September 4, 2007. The track listing of the two releases varies as "All My Tears" and "Love Me" from the initial release are substituted for "Good Monsters" and "Surprise".

== Track listing ==
=== Live Concert/Jars of Clay official store version ===
Note: All songs written by Dan Haseltine, Charlie Lowell, Stephen Mason, and Matt Odmark unless otherwise noted Note: Packaged in a cardboard cover

1. "All My Tears" – 5:45 (Julie Miller)
2. "Work" – 3:45
3. "Dead Man (Carry Me)" – 3:20
4. "There Is a River" – 3:48 (Charlie Lowell, Dan Haseltine, Matt Odmark, Stephen Mason, Ron Aniello)
5. "Oh My God" – 6:42
6. "Love Me" – 3:10
7. "Light Gives Heat" – 7:39

=== iTunes/mainstream release version ===
Note: All songs written by Dan Haseltine, Charlie Lowell, Stephen Mason, and Matt Odmark unless otherwise noted Note: Comes in a regular jewel-case with backsleeve and 2-page insert

1. "Work" – 3:45
2. "Dead Man (Carry Me)" – 3:20
3. "There Is a River" – 3:48 (Charlie Lowell, Dan Haseltine, Matt Odmark, Stephen Mason, Ron Aniello)
4. "Good Monsters" – 4:05
5. "Oh My God" – 6:37
6. "Surprise" – 3:52
7. "Light Gives Heat" – 7:39
