= Good Monsters =

Studio album by Jars of Clay
- Released: September 5, 2006
- Recorded: March–May 2006
- Genre: Alternative rock
- Length: 50:32
- Label: Essential
- Producer: Jars of Clay

Jars of Clay chronology
Mini Monsters (2006)	Good Monsters (2006)	Live Monsters (2007)

Singles from Good Monsters
- 1. "Dead Man (Carry Me)" Released: June 23, 2006; 2. "Work" Released: November 2006; 3. "There Is a River" Released: April 2007

Professional ratings
Review scores
Source	Rating
AllMusic	4/5 stars
CCM Magazine	A+
Christianity Today	5/5 stars
Cross Rhythms	9/10 stars
Jesus Freak Hideout	4.5/5 stars
Patrol Magazine	(7.4/10)
Soul Shine Magazine	4.5/5 stars

Good Monsters is the seventh full-length studio album from Jars of Clay, released by Essential Records on September 5, 2006. This is their last album of new material from Essential Records and it is said to be lyrically their most aggressive album to date. It features eleven original songs, and a remake of "All My Tears" by Julie Miller. It also features guest appearances by singer/songwriter Kate York (on "Even Angels Cry"), Leigh Nash, of Sixpence None the Richer (on "Mirrors & Smoke"), and the African Children's Choir (on "Light Gives Heat").

== Composition ==
Concerning the album's title and themes, Dan Haseltine explains, "I was not sure how all of the experiences of the last few years would translate into music. There have been so many things to look at and describe. This record is part confessional, part euphoric love poem, bitter separation and part benediction.

It was born out of many experiences and conversations between addicts, failures, lovers, loners, believers, and beggars. And so the language of recovery and the honest discourse about our attempts to live apart from God and apart from each other is a theme. Engaging people who are doing the hard work of laying their lives open to others, and avoiding isolation, has allowed me to see that there is both immeasurable evil and unfathomable good mixing under my own skin and it is grace, mercy and freedom that allow me to not simply be a monster, but to be a good monster."

== Release ==
"Dead Man (Carry Me)", the first single from the album, was released to radio stations on June 23, 2006, accompanied by music video released in 2007, featuring a montage of concert video footage taken by fans with their mobile phones. The radio edited version of the song is less "heavy" than the album version, featuring keyboards louder than electric guitars. A live concert version of "Dead Man (Carry Me)" appears on the Live Monsters EP, while the album version appears on the compilation albums Indoor Picnic Music (2006, Nettwerk), Penny Candy (2006, Nettwerk), and WOW Hits 2007 (2006, EMI Christian Music Group).

"Work" was released as the second single, along with its music video, in late August 2008. The band also released a music video for the album track "Good Monsters". The song was the 13th most played song on U.S. Christian Hit Radio stations in 2007. A live concert version of the song appears on the Live Monsters EP, which was released in 2007. An acoustic version of the song was included as a bonus thirteenth track on Good Monsters when purchased through a pre-release promotion on Apple's iTunes Store. It appeared on the compilation album WOW Hits 2008.

== Reception ==
In the September 2006 edition of CCM Magazine, the band credited fellow artist Ashley Cleveland with inspiring the improvisational sound of the album.

In an editor's fall albums overview in CCM Magazine, Good Monsters was called, "the album that Jars of Clay will be remembered for." It ended up taking the award for the CCM Magazine staff picks as album of the year, winning four out of the five spaces.

In 2007, "Dead Man (Carry Me)" was nominated for a Dove Award for Pop/Contemporary Recorded Song of the Year at the 38th GMA Dove Awards. In 2007, "Work" won a Dove Award for Short Form Music Video of the Year at the 38th GMA Dove Awards. It was also nominated for Rock/Contemporary Recorded Song of the Year.

== Track listing ==
All tracks are written by Jars of Clay (Dan Haseltine, Charlie Lowell, Stephen Mason, and Matt Odmark), except where noted.

Standard release
No.	Title	Writer(s)	Length
1.	"Work"		3:53
2.	"Dead Man (Carry Me)"		3:20
3.	"All My Tears"	Julie Miller	3:45
4.	"Even Angels Cry"		4:22
5.	"There Is a River"	Jars of Clay, Ron Aniello	3:51
6.	"Good Monsters"		4:05
7.	"Oh My God"		6:06
8.	"Surprise"		3:50
9.	"Take Me Higher"	Jars of Clay, Aniello	4:40
10.	"Mirrors & Smoke"		3:58
11.	"Light Gives Heat"		4:42
12.	"Water Under the Bridge"	Jars of Clay, Aniello	3:58

iTunes pre-release bonus track
No.	Title	Length
13.	"Work" (acoustic version)	3:36

== Personnel ==
Jars of Clay

- Dan Haseltine
- Charlie Lowell
- Stephen Mason
- Matt Odmark

Additional musicians

- Aaron Sands – bass
- Jeremy Lutito – drums
- Erin Horner – French horn
- Jennifer Kummer – French horn
- John Catchings – cello (12)
- Kristin Wilkinson – viola
- Jonathan Beach – violin
- Ned Henry – violin (8)
- Christopher Davis – horn and string arrangements
- Rosemary Butler – additional vocals (3, 9)
- Ashley Cleveland – additional vocals (3, 9)
- Kim Fleming – additional vocals (3, 9)
- Kate York – additional vocals (4)
- Leigh Nash – additional vocals (10)
- African Children's Choir – additional vocals (11)
- Elizabeth Panga – soloist

Production

- Terry Hemmings – executive producer
- Jars of Clay – producers, art direction
- Mitch Dane – recording
- Vance Powell – recording, mixing (3, 4, 6–12)
- Allen Ditto – recording assistant, mix assistant (3, 4, 7–12)
- Will James – recording assistant, mix assistant (3, 4, 7–12)
- Mike Odmark – recording assistant
- David Robinson – recording assistant
- Chris Lord-Alge – mixing (1, 5)
- Jay Ruston – mixing (2, 6)
- Keith Armstrong – mix assistant (1, 5)
- Dim-E – mix assistant (1, 5)
- Seth Morton – mix assistant (3, 4, 7–12)
- Nathan Yarborough – mix assistant (3, 4, 7–12)
- Richard Dodd – mastering at RichardDodd.com, Nashville, Tennessee
- Conor Farley – A&R coordinator
- Michelle Pearson – A&R production
- Tim Parker – art direction
- Jonathan Richter – art direction, cover design, packaging design
- Wolf Hoffman – photography
- Star Klem – stylist
- Robin Geary – hair, make-up
- Blackbird Studios, Nashville, Tennessee – recording studio
- Sputnik Sound, Nashville, Tennessee – recording studio
- Blackbird Studios, Sherman Oaks, California – mixing location
- TRS West, Sherman Oaks, California – mixing location
- Resonate Music, Burbank, California – mixing location

== Honors ==
- CCM Magazine named Good Monsters its Album of the Year shortly after its September release, unusually early for such a distinction. Editor Jay Swartzendruber declared it "the landmark album of 2006." He noted that all six members of CCM's editorial team agreed on the selection and that it was "the most profound album the Christian music community has released in years."
- Good Monsters was Christianity Today's No. 1 album of 2006, and ranked No. 5 of New Release Tuesday's top 10 albums of 2006.
- Good Monsters won the Best Rock/Contemporary Album of the Year at the GMA Dove Awards of 2007 held at the Grand Ole Opry House in Nashville.
- The album peaked at No. 58 on the Billboard 200. More than 15,000 copies were sold in its first week.
