= Missing women (disambiguation) =

Missing women is a shortfall in the number of women relative to the expected number in a region or country.

Missing women can also refer to:

- Missing Women Commission of Inquiry, an ongoing criminal investigation into the disappearance of at least 60 women from Vancouver's Downtown Eastside
- Missing and murdered Indigenous women, an independent inquiry organized 2015 by the Canadian government
- Missing Women (film), a 1951 American crime film

== See also ==
- Missing person
- Missing white woman syndrome
