= Much Afraid =

Studio album by Jars of Clay
- Released: September 16, 1997
- Studio: The Aquarium (London); Secret Sound (Franklin, Tennessee); Sixteenth Avenue Sound (Nashville)
- Genre: Alternative rock
- Length: 46:06
- Label: Essential
- Producer: Stephen Lipson

Jars of Clay chronology
Drummer Boy (1995)	Much Afraid (1997)	Stringtown (1998)

Alternative cover
- Exclusive pre-release cover

Professional ratings
Review scores
Source	Rating
AllMusic	3/5 stars
Cross Rhythms	10/10 stars
Entertainment Weekly	C−
Jesus Freak Hideout	3.5/5 stars

Much Afraid is the second studio album by American Christian rock band Jars of Clay. It was released in 1997 by Essential Records. Following the charting success of the band's debut album, Much Afraid was moderately successful, but was unable to achieve the level of its predecessor.

== Background and production ==
"Fade to Grey" and "Frail" were both previously from the group's demo recording Frail in 1994. All other tracks from that demo were recorded for the debut album Jars of Clay in 1995, but due time and budget constraints they weren't able to record the track. The versions of these songs included on Much Afraid have changed significantly with some lyrical and overall arrangement changes, especially "Frail", which was previously an instrumental piece and now contained lyrics. Notably, these songs were two of the first songs written by Jars of Clay. The new version was released as the third radio single from the Much Afraid album and reached #1 on the U.S. Christian radio charts.

The album features the multi-instrumentalist Greg Wells, who went on to produce OneRepublic, Katy Perry, Rufus Wainwright, and both Wicked (2024 film) movies, playing drums and bass guitar on almost every song; he also co-wrote "Tea and Sympathy", "Overjoyed", and the single "Crazy Times".

The title is a reference to Hannah Hurnard's 1955 novel Hinds' Feet on High Places, whose main character was named Much Afraid.

The album marked various musical and lyrical differences to its predecessor.

The song "Five Candles (You Were There)" was initially written for the soundtrack to the film Liar Liar starring Jim Carrey, but it was cut from the credits in favor of a blooper reel. A working title of the song during the writing and recording studio sessions was "The Wish", which fits with the themes of Liar Liar, just as the eventual title "Five Candles", because the story revolves around the wish Max made as he blew out the five candles for his fifth birthday. The song was later used in the 1998 Michael Keaton film, Jack Frost, and was featured on that film's soundtrack.

One song recorded during the Much Afraid sessions that did not make the final track listing is "Fly Farther". The song, featuring vocals by Alison Krauss, was later released in 1999 on the band's early rarities collection The White Elephant Sessions.

== Release and commercial performance ==
"Overjoyed" is the fourth single and the fourth consecutive No. 1 radio single from the album. An acoustic rendition of the song appears on the band's 2003 double album, Furthermore: From the Studio, From the Stage. This song was also the compilation album WOW 1998.

"Truce" is the fifth and final single and the fifth consecutive single to reach number one on the Christian radio airplay charts. No promotional single was shipped to radio stations for airplay. Instead, radio stations played the track directly from the album.

== Reception ==
The album was highly anticipated due to the success and acclaim of the band's eponymous debut album, but was not as well received. Despite debuting at No. 8 on the Billboard 200 (the group's first record had failed to reach the Top 40), it quickly slid down the chart, its sales failing to match those of its predecessor. The lead single, "Crazy Times", did not perform well on mainstream radio. It was, however, better received on Christian radio.

Much Afraid earned the band a Grammy Award for Best Pop/Contemporary Gospel Album.

== Track listing ==
All tracks are written by Jars of Clay (Dan Haseltine, Charlie Lowell, Stephen Mason, and Matt Odmark), except where noted.

No.	Title	Writer(s)	Length
1.	"Overjoyed"	Jars of Clay, Greg Wells, Mark Hudson	2:58
2.	"Fade to Grey"	Jars of Clay, Matt Bronleewe	3:34
3.	"Tea and Sympathy"	Haseltine, Greg Wells, Mark Hudson	4:51
4.	"Crazy Times"	Jars of Clay, Greg Wells, Mark Hudson	3:34
5.	"Frail"		6:57
6.	"Five Candles (You Were There)"		3:48
7.	"Weighed Down"		3:39
8.	"Portrait of an Apology"		5:43
9.	"Truce"		3:11
10.	"Much Afraid"		3:53
11.	"Hymn"		3:53

Japanese release bonus tracks
No.	Title	Length
12.	"The Chair" (from the Long Kiss Goodnight soundtrack)	5:22
13.	"Sleepers"	1:54

A bonus three-track disc was bundled with early copies of the album and made available exclusively through Family Christian Bookstores. All three tracks were recorded live acoustically on July 3, 1997, at the Quad, with no remastering or editing of the songs.

Seatbelt Tuba bonus disk
No.	Title	Length
1.	"Crazy Times"
2.	"Liquid"
3.	"The Coffee Song"

=== Charts and certifications ===
Album

Year	Billboard 200	RIAA Certification
1997	8	Platinum

Singles

Year	Song	Chart	Position
1997	"Crazy Times"	Modern Rock Tracks	38

=== Year-end charts ===
Chart (1997)	Position
US Billboard 200	199

== Personnel ==
Jars of Clay

- Dan Haseltine – vocals, percussion
- Charlie Lowell – keyboards, acoustic piano, organ, backing vocals
- Stephen Mason – guitars, bass, backing vocals
- Matt Odmark – guitars, mandolin, backing vocals

Additional musicians

- Greg Wells – bass (1–3, 8), drums (1–5, 7–10), percussion (4)
- Neil Conti – drums (6)
- Kate St. John – English horn (5)
- Ronn Huff – string arrangements (2, 5, 8, 11)
- The Nashville String Machine – strings (2, 5, 8, 11)
- Richard Niles – string arrangements (3)
- Gavyn Wright – conductor (6)
- The London Session Orchestra – strings (6)

Production

- Robert Beeson – executive producer, art direction
- Stephen Lipson – producer
- Heff Moraes – engineer, mixing
- Chuck Linder – assistant engineer
- Mike Griffith – string engineer
- Adam Hatley – assistant string engineer
- Don C. Tyler – digital editing
- Stephen Marcussen – mastering at Precision Mastering, Los Angeles, California
- Michelle Knapp – art direction
- Skye Communications – art direction, design, layout
- Photodisc – cover photography
- Martyn Galina-Jones – inside photography
- Norma Jean Roy – inside photography
