= The White Elephant Sessions =

Compilation album of rarities by Jars of Clay
- Released: November 1999
- Genre: Contemporary Christian music; folk music
- Length: 43:36
- Label: Essential
- Producer: Jars Of Clay; Stephen Lipson (on "Fly Farther")

Jars of Clay chronology
Front Yard Luge (1999)	The White Elephant Sessions (1999)	Jar of Gems (2001)

Professional ratings
Review scores
Source	Rating
Jesus Freak Hideout	3.5/5 stars

The White Elephant Sessions is a rarities and demo version album by American Christian band Jars of Clay, released in conjunction with the band's third studio album If I Left the Zoo. Several of the tracks come straight from the demo recording sessions for If I Left The Zoo, entitled the Tweed Horse Sessions.

== The title and cover ==
The title is a play on the fact that a white elephant is a rarity, and the cover of If I Left the Zoo had a grey elephant on it.

This album depicts a similar cover, except that the background is primarily red where If I Left the Zoo's background is predominantly blue and the elephant on the cover of this album is white and not grey (and the elephant is facing the other direction).

== Track listing ==
Note: All songs are written by Dan Haseltine, Matt Odmark, Stephen Mason and Charlie Lowell, unless noted otherwise

1. "Unforgetful You" (Remix) - 3:27
2. "Crazy Times" (Demo) - 3:37 (Dan Haseltine, Stephen Mason, Mark Hudson, Greg Wells)
3. "Goodbye, Goodnight" (Demo) - 2:36
4. "River Constantine" (Partial Demo) - 2:01
5. "Grace" (Hudson & Wells Demo) - 3:51 (Dan Haseltine, Matt Odmark, Stephen Mason, Charlie Lowell, Mark Hudson, Greg Wells)
6. "Headstrong" (IA Demo) - 4:04
7. "Coffee Song" (from Seatbelt Tuba) - 3:02
8. "Can't Erase It" (Tweed Horse Sessions Demo) - 3:11
9. "Kaylos" - 0:42
10. "New Math" (Tweed Horse Sessions Demo) - 3:20
11. "Fly Farther" (duet with Alison Krauss) - 5:31
12. "Collide" (Tweed Horse Sessions Demo) - 4:15
13. "Frail" (Frail Demo Album Version) - 4:04
