= If I Left the Zoo =

1999 studio album by Jars of Clay

Studio album by Jars of Clay
- Released: November 9, 1999
- Recorded: Sweet Tea Studio, Oxford, Mississippi; Battery Studios, Nashville, Tennessee; The Bennett House, Franklin, Tennessee
- Genre: Alternative rock; folk rock; folk-pop; jangle pop
- Length: 42:54
- Label: Essential
- Producer: Dennis Herring

Jars of Clay chronology
Stringtown (1998)	If I Left the Zoo (1999)	Front Yard Luge (1999)

Professional ratings
Review scores
Source	Rating
AllMusic	4/5 stars
Cross Rhythms	10/10 stars
Jesus Freak Hideout	3/5 stars

If I Left the Zoo is the third full-length studio album of the band Jars of Clay. It was released November 9, 1999, by Essential Records.

== Overview ==
The band's third album brought about another stylistic shift, away from the lush sound of Much Afraid and into more of a raw and quirky pop/rock sound with occasional folk overtones. Keyboard player Charlie Lowell was featured much more prominently on this album. Due to the influence of producer Dennis Herring and drummer Ben Mize, this album had more of a Counting Crows influence.

This album produced several Christian radio singles, most notably "Unforgetful You", which also appeared in the soundtrack to the 1999 film Drive Me Crazy.

"Unforgetful You peaked at No. 40 on Billboard Adult Top 40.

== Album title ==
The band found a picture in a stock book of an elephant whom they have affectionately named 'Agnes. They bought the picture for the album cover and then had to come up with a title. Before landing on the name If I Left the Zoo, the band tried working the titles Already, Not Yet and If I Ran the Zoo for the album. However, the latter title ran into copyright issues with a Dr. Seuss title of the same name.

== Outtakes ==
The song "Headstrong", which appears on the compilation album Roaring Lambs, is an outtake from the If I Left the Zoo recording sessions. The song was set to be released on If I Left the Zoo since it appeared as the album's eleventh track on several internet sites before its release. The version that appears on Roaring Lambs is the version that would have made the album cut as it was also produced by Dennis Herring. The demo version of "Headstrong" appears on The White Elephant Sessions.

The name of the recording sessions for If I Left the Zoo was called the Tweed Horse Sessions. Many of the songs that made the final track listing were recorded in raw form during these sessions. However, only "Collide" and "Can't Erase It" appears on The White Elephant Sessions.

== Accolades ==
This album was their second in a row to earn a Grammy Award for Best Pop/Contemporary Gospel Album.

== Track listing ==
All tracks are written by Dan Haseltine, Matt Odmark, Stephen Mason, Charlie Lowell, unless otherwise noted.

No.	Title	Writer(s)	Length
1.	"Goodbye, Goodnight"		2:53
2.	"Unforgetful You"		3:20
3.	"Collide"		4:46
4.	"No One Loves Me Like You"		3:48
5.	"Famous Last Words"		3:26
6.	"Sad Clown"		4:27
7.	"Hand"	Haseltine, Mason, Jonathan Noël	3:36
8.	"I'm Alright"		3:40
9.	"Grace"	Haseltine, Odmark, Mason, Lowell, Mark Hudson, Greg Wells	4:31
10.	"Can't Erase It"		3:35
11.	"River Constantine"		4:48
Total length:			42:50

== Credits ==
Jars of Clay

- Dan Haseltine – lead vocals, percussion (2, 8, 10, 11), loops (2, 3, 10), backing vocals (2), handclaps (4, 8), toy piano (5), drums (10)
- Charlie Lowell – accordion (1, 2, 9), backing vocals (1–7, 9–11), Vox Jaguar organ (2, 8), handclaps (2, 8), Wurlitzer electric piano (3, 5, 8), Mellotron (3, 5), pump organ (4), acoustic piano (5, 6, 10, 11), Hammond B3 organ (5, 7, 9), Moog synthesizer (6), toy piano (6), percussion (10), strings (11)
- Stephen Mason – acoustic guitar (1, 3, 5–7), backing vocals (1–7, 9–11), Casio synthesizers (2), electric guitars (2–11), handclaps (2), car horn sounds (3), lap steel guitar (9), percussion (10)
- Matt Odmark – electric guitars (1), acoustic guitar (2–5, 7–11), handclaps (2, 8), backing vocals (2), lab technician (5), percussion (10, 11)

Additional musicians

- Dennis Herring – handclaps (2, 8), acoustic guitar (4), guitar stylings (7)
- Clay Jones – acoustic guitar (4), mandolin (4)
- Ben Egan – lap steel guitar (6)
- Aaron Sands – bass (2–11), percussion (10)
- Ben Mize – drums (1, 2, 4–11), percussion (1, 8, 10), minute timer sounds (5)
- Joe Porter – drums (3)
- David Henry – cello (1)
- Ned Henry – violin (1)
- Jonathan Noël – backing vocals (7)

Oxford Coffee Choir on "Goodbye, Goodnight"

- Robert Cooper
- David Fair
- Billy Hancock
- Tom Hurdle
- Dick Marchbanks
- John Valentine

The Darwin Hobbs Gospel Choir on "I'm Alright

- Darwin Hobbs
- Sherrie Kibble
- Gale Mayes West
- Leanne Palmore
- Angela Primm
- Duawne Starling

Production

- Robert Beeson – executive producer, art direction
- Michael Tedesco – executive producer
- Dennis Herring – producer, mixing
- Richard Hasal – engineer
- Rob Cooper – second engineer
- Ted Gainey – second engineer
- Lee Groitzsch – second engineer
- Shawn McLean – second engineer
- Clay Jones – additional mixing
- Bob Ludwig – mastering at Gateway Mastering, Portland, Maine
- Michelle Pearson – A&R production
- Michelle Kapp – design
- Michael Wilson – artist photography
- John Webber – cover image photography
- Bill Robert – in-studio photography
- Double Down Images – couch photography

== Charts and RIAA certifications ==
Release year	Billboard	RIAA Certification
1999	44	Gold

== Front Yard Luge (bonus disc) ==
Front Yard Luge is a live, mini-album that was available with pre-order of If I Left The Zoo from select retailers.

Front Yard Luge

Live album by Jars of Clay

No.	Title	Writer(s)	Length
1.	"Rose Colored Stained Glass Windows"	Bob Hartman	5:22
2.	"No Matter What"	Peter Ham	2:53
3.	"The Coffee Song"	Dan Haseltine; Matt Odmark; Steve Mason; Charlie Lowell	3:35
4.	"Crazy Love"	Rusty Young	2:36
5.	"Liquid"	Dan Haseltine; Steve Mason; Charlie Lowell	5:11
6.	"God Only Knows"	Brian Wilson; Tony Asher	3:09
7.	"Swingtown"	Steve Miller; Chris McCarty	4:42
Total length:			27:28
