= List of songs recorded by For King & Country =

List of songs recorded by Australian-American christian pop duo For King & Country

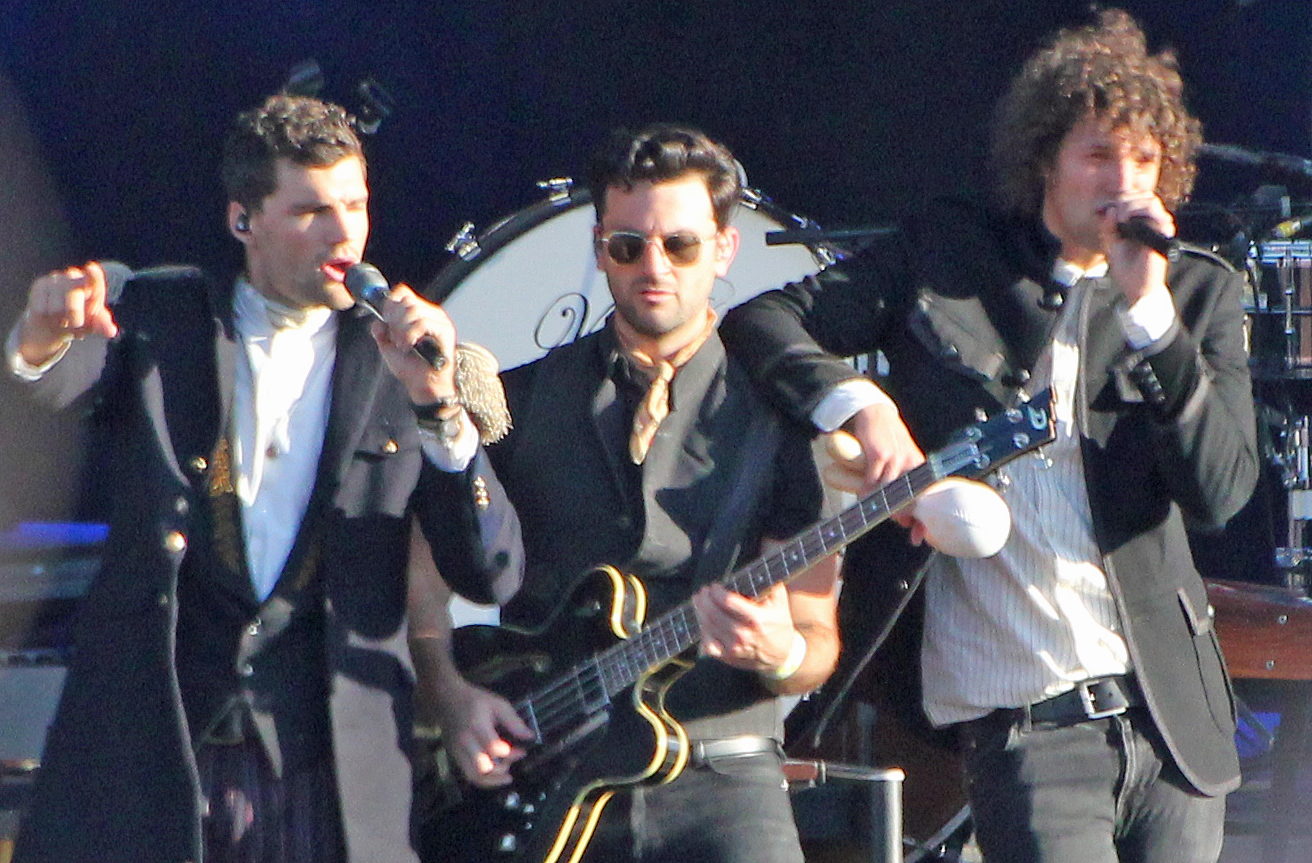
For King & Country performing in 2018

Australian-American Christian pop duo For King & Country was formed in 2012, after around 5 years of attempting to write music under the names Joel & Luke and Austoville. The band is made up of two brothers, named Joel Smallbone and Luke Smallbone. The band have released 5 studio albums, Crave (2012), Run Wild. Live Free. Love Strong. (2014), Burn the Ships (2018), A Drummer Boy Christmas (2020) and What Are We Waiting For? (2022). The band has collaborated with a number of songwriters, such as Tedd T, Aqualung, Seth Mosley and Ben Glover. The band has also collaborated with a number of other musical artists, such as Tori Kelly, Andy Mineo, Needtobreathe and Lecrae among others.

== Released songs ==
List of songs recorded showing title, artist(s), writer(s), album(s) and year(s) of release
Title (Note: Doesn't include remixed versions of songs)	Artist(s)	Writer(s) (Note: for KING & COUNTRY represents Joel Smallbone and Luke Smallbone)	Album(s) (Note: Doesn't include appearances on live albums, or appearances on deluxe albums unless it was the first official release of the song)	Year(s) of release	Ref.
"A Christmas Monologue"	for KING & COUNTRY	for KING & COUNTRY; Benjamin Backus; Tedd Tjornhom	A Drummer Boy Christmas	2020	
"A Reminder"	for KING & COUNTRY & I WAS THE LION	for KING & COUNTRY; Benjamin Backus; Mark Campbell	Priceless (Original Motion Picture Soundtrack)	2017	
"Aftermath"	for KING & COUNTRY & I WAS THE LION	for KING & COUNTRY; Benjamin Backus; Mark Campbell	Priceless (Original Motion Picture Soundtrack)	2017	
"Already Home"	for KING & COUNTRY	for KING & COUNTRY; Matt Hales	Run Wild. Live Free. Love Strong.	2014	
"Amen"	for KING & COUNTRY	for KING & COUNTRY; Ryan Busbee; Michael James; Seth Mosley; Tedd Tjornhom	Burn the Ships	2018	
"Amen"	for KING & COUNTRY	for KING & COUNTRY; Ryan Busbee; Michael James; Seth Mosley; Tedd Tjornhom	Burn the Ships	2021 (Note: as a single)	
"Angels We Have Heard on High"	for KING & COUNTRY	Traditional	Into the Silent Night: The EP	2013	
"Angels We Have Heard on High"	for KING & COUNTRY	Traditional	A Drummer Boy Christmas	2020	
"Antonia’s Rescue"	for KING & COUNTRY & I WAS THE LION	for KING & COUNTRY; Benjamin Backus; Mark Campbell	Priceless (Original Motion Picture Soundtrack)	2017	
"Baby Boy"	for KING & COUNTRY	for KING & COUNTRY; Matt Hammitt; Seth Mosley	Into the Silent Night: The EP	2013	
"Benediction"	for KING & COUNTRY	for KING & COUNTRY; Ran Jackson; Ricky Jackson; Nicolas Balachandran	What Are We Waiting For?	2022	
"Better Man"	for KING & COUNTRY	for KING & COUNTRY; Josh Kerr; Tedd Tjornhom	What Are We Waiting For +	2023	
"Bring You War"	KB featuring for KING & COUNTRY	Kevin Burgess; Joseph Prielozny; Benjamin Backus for KING & COUNTRY; Chris Michael Anderson	Today We Rebel	2017	
"Broken Halos"	for KING & COUNTRY	for KING & COUNTRY; Mick Coogan; Josh Kerr	What Are We Waiting For?	2022	
"Burn the Ships"	for KING & COUNTRY	for KING & COUNTRY; Matt Hales; Seth Mosley	Burn the Ships	2018	
"Burn the Ships"	for KING & COUNTRY	for KING & COUNTRY; Matt Hales; Seth Mosley	Burn the Ships	2019	
"Busted Heart (Hold On to Me)"	for KING & COUNTRY	for KING & COUNTRY; Ben Glover; Jenna Torres	for King & Country - The EP	2011	
"Busted Heart (Hold On to Me)"	for KING & COUNTRY	for KING & COUNTRY; Ben Glover; Jenna Torres	Crave	2012	
"Carry Me"	for KING & COUNTRY & I WAS THE LION	for KING & COUNTRY; Benjamin Backus; Mark Campbell	Priceless (Original Motion Picture Soundtrack)	2017	
"Caught Dreaming"	Andy Mineo featuring for KING & COUNTRY	Jeremy Griffith; Andy Mineo for KING & COUNTRY; Courtney Peebles	Heroes for Sale	2013	
"Ceasefire"	for KING & COUNTRY	for KING & COUNTRY; Seth Mosley; Tedd Tjornhom	Run Wild. Live Free. Love Strong. Deluxe Anniversary Edition	2015	
"Cheering You On"	for KING & COUNTRY	for KING & COUNTRY; Josh Kerr; Jordan Reynolds	What Are We Waiting For?	2022	
"Control"	for KING & COUNTRY	for KING & COUNTRY; Ben Glover; Matt Hales; Josh Kerr; Jordan Reynolds; Kyle Rictor; Tedd Tjornhom	Burn the Ships	2018	
"Crave"	for KING & COUNTRY	for KING & COUNTRY; Shaun Shankel	Crave	2012	
"Dawn"	Rebecca St. James featuring Luke Smallbone	Seth Mosley; Rebecca St. James; Luke Smallbone; Tedd Tjornhom	Dawn	2020	
"Different World"	for KING & COUNTRY & I WAS THE LION	for KING & COUNTRY; Benjamin Backus; Mark Campbell	Priceless (Original Motion Picture Soundtrack)	2017	
"Do You Hear What I Hear?"	for KING & COUNTRY	Noël Regney; Gloria Shayne Baker	A Drummer Boy Christmas (Expanded Edition)	2021	
"Epilogue"	for KING & COUNTRY	—	Run Wild. Live Free. Love Strong. Deluxe Anniversary Edition	2015	
"Fight On, Fighter"	for KING & COUNTRY	for KING & COUNTRY; Benjamin Backus; Mark Campbell; Ben Glover; Tedd Tjornhom	Burn the Ships	2018	
"Fine Fine Life"	for KING & COUNTRY	for KING & COUNTRY; Ran Jackson; Ricky Jackson	for King & Country - The EP	2011	
"Fine Fine Life"	for KING & COUNTRY	for KING & COUNTRY; Ran Jackson; Ricky Jackson	Crave	2012	
"Fix My Eyes"	for KING & COUNTRY	for KING & COUNTRY; Seth Mosley	Run Wild. Live Free. Love Strong.	2014	
"Fix My Eyes"	for KING & COUNTRY	for KING & COUNTRY; Seth Mosley	The Live Room Sessions at RCA Studio A	2015	
"For God Is with Us"	for KING & COUNTRY	for KING & COUNTRY; Josh Kerr; Jordan Reynolds	What Are We Waiting For?	2021	
"Glorious"	for KING & COUNTRY	for KING & COUNTRY; Andy Mineo; Tedd Tjornhom	Into the Silent Night: The EP Extended Edition	2016	
"Go Tell It on the Mountain"	for KING & COUNTRY featuring Gabby Barrett	John Wesley Work Jr.	A Drummer Boy Christmas	2020	
"God Only Knows"	for KING & COUNTRY	for KING & COUNTRY; Josh Kerr; Jordan Reynolds; Tedd Tjornhom	Burn the Ships	2018	
"God Only Knows"	for KING & COUNTRY	for KING & COUNTRY; Josh Kerr; Jordan Reynolds; Tedd Tjornhom	Burn the Ships	2019	
"Harmony"	for KING & COUNTRY featuring Sleeping at Last	for KING & COUNTRY; Federico Vindver; Seth Mosley; Matt Hales	What Are We Waiting For?	2022	
"Heavenly Hosts"	for KING & COUNTRY	for KING & COUNTRY; Benjamin Backus; Matt Hales; Tedd Tjornhom; Tony Wood	A Drummer Boy Christmas	2020	
"Heavenly Hosts"	for KING & COUNTRY	for KING & COUNTRY; Benjamin Backus; Matt Hales; Tedd Tjornhom; Tony Wood	A Drummer Boy Christmas	2021	
"Hold Her"	for KING & COUNTRY	for KING & COUNTRY; Rebecca St. James; Tedd Tjornhom	Burn the Ships	2018	
"Hold On Pain Ends"	for KING & COUNTRY	for KING & COUNTRY; Josh Kerr; Jordan Reynolds	What Are We Waiting For?	2022	
"I Still Believe"	Lecrae and for KING & COUNTRY	Joaquin Bynum; Alexandria Dollar; Jordan Dollar; Deandre Hunter; Lecrae Moore; Jeffrey Shannon; Joel Smallbone; Luke Smallbone; Tedd Tjornhom	non-album single	2024	
"In the Bleak Midwinter (Epilogue)"	for KING & COUNTRY	Christina Rossetti	A Drummer Boy Christmas	2020	
"In the Bleak Midwinter (Prologue)"	for KING & COUNTRY	Christina Rossetti	A Drummer Boy Christmas	2020	
"Infinite (Unsung Heroes)"	Built By Titan featuring Joel Smallbone	Built By Titan; Joel Smallbone	non-album single	2016	
"Into the Silent Night"	for KING & COUNTRY	for KING & COUNTRY; Seth Mosley	Into the Silent Night: The EP	2013	
"Introit"	for KING & COUNTRY	Matt Hales; Blake Kanicka; Tedd Tjornhom	Burn the Ships	2018	
"It's Not Over Yet" (also known as "It's Not Over Yet (The Encore)")	for KING & COUNTRY	for KING & COUNTRY; Ben Glover; Kyle Rictor; Tedd Tjornhom	Run Wild. Live Free. Love Strong.	2014	
"It's Not Over Yet" (also known as "It's Not Over Yet (The Encore)")	for KING & COUNTRY	for KING & COUNTRY; Ben Glover; Kyle Rictor; Tedd Tjornhom	Run Wild. Live Free. Love Strong.	2016	
"Joy"	for KING & COUNTRY	for KING & COUNTRY; Matt Hales; Blake Kanicka; Seth Mosley; Tedd Tjornhom	Burn the Ships	2018	
"Joy to the World"	for KING & COUNTRY	Isaac Watts	A Drummer Boy Christmas	2020	
"Kingdom Come"	Rebecca St. James featuring for KING & COUNTRY	Rebecca St. James; Seth Mosley for KING & COUNTRY	Kingdom Come	2021	
"Light it Up"	for KING & COUNTRY	for KING & COUNTRY; Matt Hales	for King & Country - The EP	2011	
"Light it Up"	for KING & COUNTRY	for KING & COUNTRY; Matt Hales	Crave	2012	
"Little Drummer Boy"	for KING & COUNTRY	Katherine Kennicott Davis; Henry Onorati; Harry Simeone	Into the Silent Night: The EP	2013	
"Little Drummer Boy"	for KING & COUNTRY	Katherine Kennicott Davis; Henry Onorati; Harry Simeone	non-album single	2018	
"Little Drummer Boy"	for KING & COUNTRY	Katherine Kennicott Davis; Henry Onorati; Harry Simeone	A Drummer Boy Christmas	2020	
"Little Voice"	for KING & COUNTRY & I WAS THE LION	for KING & COUNTRY; Benjamin Backus; Mark Campbell	Priceless (Original Motion Picture Soundtrack)	2017	
"Long Live"	for KING & COUNTRY	for KING & COUNTRY; Seth Mosley; Blair Daly	Run Wild. Live Free. Love Strong.	2014	
"Love Me Like I Am"	for KING & COUNTRY	for KING & COUNTRY; Josh Kerr; Michael Pollack	What Are We Waiting For?	2022	
"Love Me Like I Am"	for KING & COUNTRY featuring Jordin Sparks	for KING & COUNTRY; Josh Kerr; Michael Pollack	What Are We Waiting For +	2023	
"Love's to Blame"	for KING & COUNTRY	for KING & COUNTRY; Rebecca St. James	for King & Country - The EP	2011	
"Love's to Blame"	for KING & COUNTRY	for KING & COUNTRY; Rebecca St. James	Crave	2012	
"Matter"	for KING & COUNTRY	for KING & COUNTRY; Seth Mosley	Run Wild. Live Free. Love Strong.	2014	
"Messengers"	Lecrae featuring for KING & COUNTRY	Lecrae Moore for KING & COUNTRY; Ran Jackson; Ricky Jackson; Kenneth Chris Mackey; Joseph Prielozny; Torrance Esmond	Anomaly	2014	
"Middle of Your Heart"	for KING & COUNTRY	for KING & COUNTRY; Ben Glover	Crave	2012	
"Missing"	for KING & COUNTRY	for KING & COUNTRY; Ben Glover	Crave	2012	
"Need You More"	for KING & COUNTRY	for KING & COUNTRY; Rebecca St. James; Seth Mosley; Tedd Tjornhom	Burn the Ships	2018	
"Never Give Up"	for KING & COUNTRY	for KING & COUNTRY; Rebecca St. James; Jason Ingram; Seth Mosley; Tedd Tjornhom	Burn the Ships	2018	
"No Turning Back"	for KING & COUNTRY	for KING & COUNTRY; Seth Mosley	Run Wild. Live Free. Love Strong.	2014	
"No Turning Back"	for KING & COUNTRY	for KING & COUNTRY; Seth Mosley	The Live Room Sessions at RCA Studio A	2015	
"O Come, All Ye Faithful"	for KING & COUNTRY	Traditional	A Drummer Boy Christmas	2020	
"O Come, O Come Emmanuel"	for KING & COUNTRY featuring Needtobreathe	Traditional	A Drummer Boy Christmas	2020	
"O God Forgive Us"	for KING & COUNTRY featuring KB	for KING & COUNTRY; Seth Mosley	Run Wild. Live Free. Love Strong.	2014	
"Out of the Woods" (Taylor Swift cover)	for KING & COUNTRY	Taylor Swift; Jack Antonoff	Out Of The Woods (Live From Sound Stage Studio)	2016	
"People Change"	for KING & COUNTRY	for KING & COUNTRY Chris Antblad; Ben Glover	non-album single	2010	
"People Change"	for KING & COUNTRY	for KING & COUNTRY Chris Antblad; Ben Glover	for King & Country - The EP	2011	
"People Change"	for KING & COUNTRY	for KING & COUNTRY Chris Antblad; Ben Glover	Crave	2012	
"Pioneers"	for KING & COUNTRY featuring Moriah Peters and Courtney Smallbone	for KING & COUNTRY; Benjamin Backus; Vince DiCarlo; Matt Hales; Blake Kanicka; Stephen Lynch	Burn the Ships	2018	
"Prelude (Fix My Eyes)"	for KING & COUNTRY	—	Run Wild. Live Free. Love Strong.	2014	
"Priceless"	for KING & COUNTRY	for KING & COUNTRY; Benjamin Backus; Tedd Tjornhom	Run Wild. Live Free. Love Strong. Deluxe Anniversary Edition	2015	
"Priceless"	for KING & COUNTRY	for KING & COUNTRY; Benjamin Backus; Tedd Tjornhom	Run Wild. Live Free. Love Strong. Deluxe Anniversary Edition	2016	
"Priceless (The Film Ballad)"	for KING & COUNTRY & I WAS THE LION featuring Bianca A. Santos	for KING & COUNTRY; Benjamin Backus; Mark Campbell; Seth Mosley; Tedd Tjornhom	Priceless (Original Motion Picture Soundtrack)	2017	
"Pushing on a Pull Door"	for KING & COUNTRY	for KING & COUNTRY; Matt Hales	Crave	2012	
"Relate"	for KING & COUNTRY	for KING & COUNTRY; Josh Kerr; Tayla Parx	What Are We Waiting For?	2021	
"Run Wild"	for KING & COUNTRY featuring Andy Mineo	for KING & COUNTRY; Matt Hales; Andy Mineo; Tedd Tjornhom	Run Wild. Live Free. Love Strong.	2014	
"Run Wild"	for KING & COUNTRY featuring Andy Mineo	for KING & COUNTRY; Matt Hales; Andy Mineo; Tedd Tjornhom	The Live Room Sessions at RCA Studio A	2015	
"Sane"	for KING & COUNTRY	for KING & COUNTRY; Tyler Hayes	Crave	2012	
"Seasons"	for KING & COUNTRY	for KING & COUNTRY; Josh Kerr; Michael Buzz	What Are We Waiting For?	2022	
"Shoulders"	for KING & COUNTRY	for KING & COUNTRY; Ben Glover; Tedd Tjornhom	Run Wild. Live Free. Love Strong.	2014	
"Shoulders"	for KING & COUNTRY	for KING & COUNTRY; Ben Glover; Tedd Tjornhom	The Live Room Sessions at RCA Studio A	2015	
"Shy"	for KING & COUNTRY	for KING & COUNTRY; Josh Kerr; Taylor Hill	What Are We Waiting For?	2022	
"Silent Night"	for KING & COUNTRY	Franz Xaver Gruber; Joseph Mohr	A Drummer Boy Christmas	2020	
"Steady"	for KING & COUNTRY	for KING & COUNTRY; Ben Glover; Tedd Tjornhom	Run Wild. Live Free. Love Strong.	2014	
"Take This City"	Everfound featuring Joel Smallbone	Casey Brown; Nikita Odnoralov; Ruslan Odnoralov; Yan Odnoralov; Joel Smallbone	Everfound	2013	
"The Carol of Joseph (I Believe in You)"	for KING & COUNTRY	for KING & COUNTRY; Matt Hales	A Drummer Boy Christmas	2020	
"The Proof of Your Love"	for KING & COUNTRY	for KING & COUNTRY; Ben Glover; Jonathan Lee; Fred Williams	Crave	2012	
"This Is Love"	for KING & COUNTRY	for KING & COUNTRY; Brian Howes; Tedd Tjornhom	Run Wild. Live Free. Love Strong.	2014	
"To the Dreamers"	for KING & COUNTRY	for KING & COUNTRY; Matt Hales	Run Wild. Live Free. Love Strong.	2014	
"To the Dreamers"	for KING & COUNTRY	for KING & COUNTRY; Matt Hales	The Live Room Sessions at RCA Studio A	2015	
"Together"	for KING & COUNTRY featuring Tori Kelly and Kirk Franklin	for KING & COUNTRY; Kirk Franklin; Ran Jackson; Ricky Jackson; Josh Kerr	What Are We Waiting For?	2020	
"Together"	for KING & COUNTRY featuring Tori Kelly and Kirk Franklin	for KING & COUNTRY; Kirk Franklin; Ran Jackson; Ricky Jackson; Josh Kerr	Burn the Ships (Deluxe Edition: Remixes & Collaborations)	2021	
"Unity"	for KING & COUNTRY featuring Dante Bowe	for KING & COUNTRY; Josh Kerr; Antony Williams; Federico Vindver	What Are We Waiting For?	2022	
"Unsung Hero"	for KING & COUNTRY	for KING & COUNTRY; Federico Vindver; Seth Mosley	What Are We Waiting For?	2022	
"What Are We Waiting For?"	for KING & COUNTRY	for KING & COUNTRY; Josh Kerr; Sean Douglas	What Are We Waiting For +	2023	
"Wholehearted"	for KING & COUNTRY	for KING & COUNTRY; Matt Hales	Run Wild. Live Free. Love Strong. Deluxe Anniversary Edition	2015	
"Without You"	for KING & COUNTRY featuring Courtney Smallbone	for KING & COUNTRY; Benjamin Backus; Mark Campbell; Matt Hales; Timmy Jones; Blake Kanicka; Stephen Lynch	Run Wild. Live Free. Love Strong.	2014	
"Won't You Come"	for KING & COUNTRY	for KING & COUNTRY; Benjamin Backus; Mark Campbell; Blake Kanicka; Stephen Lynch; Timmy Jones; Vince DiCarlo	A Drummer Boy Christmas	2020	
"Worth More"	for KING & COUNTRY & I WAS THE LION	for KING & COUNTRY; Benjamin Backus; Mark Campbell	Priceless (Original Motion Picture Soundtrack)	2017	

== Unreleased songs ==
Title	Details	Ref.
"A Little Longer"	Song idea in Luke's Phone unveiled in a YouTube video about "Need You More" (2018).	
"Angel On The Phone"	Demo written in the band's early years.	
"Believe Me Now"	Released on Joel & Luke's 2008 EP, A Tale of Two Towns.	
"Best is Yet To Come"	Song idea in Luke's Phone unveiled in a YouTube video about "Need You More" (2018).	
"Better Than Me"	Demo written in the band's early years.	
"Broken Lullabies"	Released on Joel & Luke's 2008 EP, A Tale of Two Towns.	
"Brothers"	Registered on the American Society of Composers, Authors and Publishers (ASCAP) website.	
"Can You Relate"	Registered on the American Society of Composers, Authors and Publishers (ASCAP) website. Most likely an earlier version of "Relate" (2021).	
"Cease Fire (One By One)"	Registered on the American Society of Composers, Authors and Publishers (ASCAP) website. Most likely an earlier version of "Ceasefire"(2015).	
"Delight In You"	Song idea in Luke's Phone unveiled in a YouTube video about "Need You More" (2018).	
"God Only Knows Remix"	Registered on the American Society of Composers, Authors and Publishers (ASCAP) website. Most likely one of the remixes of "God Only Knows" (2018).	
"Goodbye"	Demo written in the band's early years.	
"Gotta Hold You Up"	Song idea in Luke's Phone unveiled in a YouTube video about "Need You More" (2018).	
"Happy After"	Demo written in the band's early years.	
"Harmony"	Demo written in the band's early years, not to be confused with "Harmony" (2022).	
"Hey Hey Hello"	Demo written in the band's early years.	
"Hold You So Tight"	Song idea in Luke's Phone unveiled in a YouTube video about "Need You More" (2018).	
"Hole In Your Heart"	Song idea in Luke's Phone unveiled in a YouTube video about "Need You More" (2018).	
"How Long"	Song idea in Luke's Phone unveiled in a YouTube video about "Need You More" (2018).	
"I Care Out Looking"	Song idea in Luke's Phone unveiled in a YouTube video about "Need You More" (2018).	
"I Gotta Be"	Song idea in Luke's Phone unveiled in a YouTube video about "Need You More" (2018).	
"I Want You To Know"	Song idea in Luke's Phone unveiled in a YouTube video about "Need You More" (2018).	
"Into Your Light"	Song idea in Luke's Phone unveiled in a YouTube video about "Need You More" (2018).	
"Jesus Gonna Save Me"	Registered on the American Society of Composers, Authors and Publishers (ASCAP) website.	
"Jump To The Light"	Song idea in Luke's Phone unveiled in a YouTube video about "Need You More" (2018).	
"Just About Going To"	Song idea in Luke's Phone unveiled in a YouTube video about "Need You More" (2018).	
"Just Me and You"	Song idea in Luke's Phone unveiled in a YouTube video about "Need You More" (2018).	
"Knew It Lang"	Demo written in the band's early years.	
"Long Live the Young At Heart"	Registered on the American Society of Composers, Authors and Publishers (ASCAP) website. Most likely an earlier version of "Long Live" (2014).	
"Love Me Doll"	Demo written in the band's early years.	
"Love's To Blame (Can't See You)"	Registered on the American Society of Composers, Authors and Publishers (ASCAP) website. Most likely an earlier version of "Love's To Blame" (2012).	
"Mint Blue Sky"	Demo written in the band's early years.	
"More Than"	Song idea in Luke's Phone unveiled in a YouTube video about "Need You More" (2018).	
"My Lovely"	Demo written in the band's early years.	
"Never Ever"	Song idea in Luke's Phone unveiled in a YouTube video about "Need You More" (2018).	
"Never Gonna"	Song idea in Luke's Phone unveiled in a YouTube video about "Need You More" (2018).	
"Part Of Me"	Song idea in Luke's Phone unveiled in a YouTube video about "Need You More" (2018).	
"Play It Like A Drum"	Song idea in Luke's Phone unveiled in a YouTube video about "Need You More" (2018).	
"Same Blood Different Clothes"	Registered on the American Society of Composers, Authors and Publishers (ASCAP) website.	
"She Believes In Me"	Demo written in the band's early years.	
"Shoulders (On Your Shoulders)"	Registered on the American Society of Composers, Authors and Publishers (ASCAP) website. Most likely an earlier version of "Shoulders" (2014).	
"So Much Better"	Song idea in Luke's Phone unveiled in a YouTube video about "Need You More" (2018).	
"Something to Believe"	Demo written in the band's early years.	
"Something's Gotta Give"	Released on Joel & Luke's 2008 EP, A Tale of Two Towns.	
"Static"	Demo written in the band's early years.	
"Taken"	Demo written in the band's early years.	
"Up the Octave"	Song idea in Luke's Phone unveiled in a YouTube video about "Need You More" (2018).	
"We're Gonna Make It"	Song idea in Luke's Phone unveiled in a YouTube video about "Need You More" (2018).	
"Without Love"	Demo written in the band's early years.	
"Your Light Light Light"	Song idea in Luke's Phone unveiled in a YouTube video about "Need You More" (2018).	

== See also ==
- For King & Country discography
