= Unsung Hero (For King & Country song) =

2022 song by For King & Country

Promotional single by For King & Country

from the album What Are We Waiting For?
- Released: 7 January 2022
- Genre: CCM; pop rock
- Length: 3:31
- Label: Word Entertainment
- Songwriters: Joel Smallbone; Luke Smallbone; Federico Vindver; Seth Mosley
- Producers: Federico Vindver; Seth Mosley; For King & Country

For King & Country chronology
"Heavenly Hosts" (2021)	"Unsung Hero" (2022)	"Love Me Like I Am" (2022)

Music videos
- "Unsung Hero" on YouTube
- "Unsung Hero" (Lyrics) on YouTube

"Unsung Hero" is a song by an Australian Christian pop duo For King & Country. The song was released as the first promotional single from their fifth studio album, What Are We Waiting For? (2022), on 7 January 2022. The song was written by Federico Vindver, Joel Smallbone, Luke Smallbone, and Seth Mosley.

"Unsung Hero" peaked at No. 42 on the US Hot Christian Songs chart.

== Background ==
On 7 January 2022, For King & Country released "Unsung Hero" as the first promotional single from What Are We Waiting For? (2022), concurrently launching the album's pre-order. The song follows the release of 2021 singles "Relate" and "For God Is with Us." The song is dedicated to the parents of the duo, the Smallbones, for the sacrifices they made in moving from Australia to the United States and molding them into the men they are now. They shared in an interview with Billboard that their father used to work as a tour promoter in Australia who went into financial ruin over a tour gone wrong, and decided to move to the United States at age 40 with his family of six children at the time. In the United States, their father began managing artists, including their sister Rebecca St. James, who went on to pursue a successful solo career while the duo worked with her backstage. The duo also shared that they are working on a movie that is based on "Unsung Hero" which will tell the story of their parents' journey, and it will be their second film following Priceless (2016).

== Composition ==
"Unsung Hero" is composed in the key of B♭ with a tempo of 76.5 beats per minute and a musical time signature of 4/4.

== Critical reception ==
Jesus Freak Hideout's Alex Caldwell wrote in his review that "'Unsung Hero' is a wonderful ode to the sacrifice and faith of parents, and the Smallbone parents specifically." Timothy Yap of JubileeCast praised the song, saying, ""Unsung Hero," easily the album's most moving cut, is a slice of autobiography as the siblings pay tribute to their parents."

== Commercial performance ==
"Unsung Hero" debuted at number 42 on the US Hot Christian Songs chart dated 22 January 2022, concurrently charting at No. 4 on the Christian Digital Song Sales chart.

== Music videos ==
The official music video for "Unsung Hero" was published on For King & Country's YouTube channel on 7 January 2022. The music video features home movies and photos from the duo's childhood. The official lyric video for the song was uploaded on YouTube on 21 January 2022.

== Film ==
On 30 November 2022, the brothers announced via social media that they had made a film with their brother Ben, called Unsung Hero, which is about their mother, although they didn't announce a release date. The film is scheduled to release on 26 April 2024 by Lionsgate.

== Charts ==
=== Weekly charts ===
Weekly chart performance for "Unsung Hero"
Chart (2022–2024)	Peak position
US Adult Contemporary (Billboard)	11
US Hot Christian Songs (Billboard)	42

=== Year-end charts ===
2024 year-end chart performance for "Unsung Hero"
Chart (2024)	Position
US Adult Contemporary (Billboard)	23

== Release history ==
Release dates and formats for "Unsung Hero"
Region	Date	Format	Label	Ref.
Various	7 January 2022	Digital download; streaming; (promotional release)	Word Entertainment	
