= Amen (For King & Country song) =

2018 song by For King & Country

Single by For King & Country

from the album Burn the Ships
- Released: 5 February 2021
- Genre: CCM
- Length: 3:47
- Label: Word Entertainment
- Songwriters: Ryan Busbee; Michael James; Matt Hales; Seth Mosley; Joel Smallbone; Luke Smallbone; Tedd Tjornhom
- Producers: Tedd Tjornhom; Matt Hales; Seth Mosley; Joel Smallbone; Luke Smallbone

For King & Country singles chronology
"Do You Hear What I Hear?" (2020)	"Amen" (2021)	"Relate" (2021)

Music video
- "Amen" on YouTube

"Amen" is a song performed by an Australian Christian pop duo For King & Country. The song impacted Christian radio in the United States on 5 February 2021, becoming the fourth single from Burn the Ships (2018). The song was written by Matt Hales, Seth Mosley, Joel Smallbone and Luke Smallbone.

"Amen" peaked at No. 5 on the US Hot Christian Songs chart.

== Background ==
"Amen" was initially released on 24 August 2018 as the fourth promotional single from their album, Burn the Ships (2018). Joel Smallbone shared the story behind the song, saying:

A year and a half ago, Luke [Smallbone] came into the studio and shared a personal story. That personal story ended up becoming this song. He had heard the minister speak about the meaning of baptism and Luke felt compelled to make that statement once again as an adult. There was a tangible moment as he rose out of the water where time stood still, and a new day had begun. This story of death to life became our song, "Amen."

== Composition ==
"Amen" is composed in the key of A minor with a tempo of 94 beats per minute.

== Commercial performance ==
"Amen" debuted at number 25 on the US Hot Christian Songs chart dated September 8, 2018. The song went onto spend twelve non-consecutive weeks on the chart before dropping off. Prior to the official release of "Amen" on Christian radio, the song debuted on Christian Airplay dated 16 January 2021, at number 48. The song returned to the Hot Christian Songs the following week, registering at number 48. Billboard reported that "Amen" broke through the top ten of the Hot Christian Songs chart, entering at No. 9 on the May 1-dated chart, owing to substantial gains in radio airplay and streams.

== Music video ==
The music video of "Amen" was published on For King & Country's YouTube channel on 5 October 2018. The music video was filmed in the Salt Flats of Utah, which Joel Smallbone said "is the flattest place on the earth," and "resonated with the dark and desolate life without great hope."

== Performances ==
For King & Country did a pre-recorded performance of the song featuring Lecrae for the 51st GMA Dove Awards, aired on the Trinity Broadcasting Network on 30 October 2020.

== Track listing ==
"Amen (Reborn)"
No.	Title	Writer(s)	Length
1.	"Amen (Reborn)" (with Lecrae and The World Famous Tony Williams)	Ryan Busbee; Lecrae Moore; Michael James; Matt Hales; Seth Mosley; Joel Smallbone; Luke Smallbone; Tedd Tjornhom	3:48

== Charts ==
=== Weekly charts ===
Weekly chart performance for "Amen"
Chart (2021)	Peak position
US Adult Contemporary (Billboard)	13
US Hot Christian Songs (Billboard)	5
US Christian Airplay (Billboard)	1
US Christian AC (Billboard)	1

=== Year-end charts ===
Year-end chart performance for "Amen"
Chart (2021)	Position
US Adult Contemporary (Billboard)	28
US Christian Songs (Billboard)	19
US Christian Airplay (Billboard)	17
US Christian AC (Billboard)	11

== Certifications ==
Region	Certification	Certified units/sales
United States (RIAA)	Gold	500,000^{‡}
^{‡} Sales+streaming figures based on certification alone.

== Release history ==
Region	Date	Version	Format	Label	Ref.
Various	24 August 2018	Album	Digital download (promotional release); streaming (promotional release)	Word Entertainment	
Various	29 January 2021	Reborn (with Lecrae and The World Famous Tony Williams)	Digital download; streaming	Word Entertainment	
United States	5 February 2021	Single	Christian radio	Word Entertainment	
