= Love Me Like I Am =

2022 single by For King & Country and Jordin Sparks

Single by For King & Country and Jordin Sparks

from the album What Are We Waiting For?
- Released: 7 October 2022
- Genre: CCM; pop rock
- Length: 3:05
- Label: Word Entertainment
- Songwriters: Joel Smallbone; Luke Smallbone; Josh Kerr; Michael Pollack
- Producers: For King & Country; Josh Kerr; Jeff Sojka

For King & Country singles chronology
"Heavenly Hosts" (2022)	"Love Me Like I Am" (2022)	"What Are We Waiting For?" (2023)

Jordin Sparks singles chronology
"You Still Think of Me" (2021)	"Love Me Like I Am" (2022)	"Call My Name" (2023)

Music videos
- "Love Me Like I Am" on YouTube
- "Love Me Like I Am" (Lyrics) on YouTube

"Love Me Like I Am" is a song by an Australian Christian pop duo For King & Country and American singer Jordin Sparks. The original version of the song was initially released as the second promotional single from For King & Country's fifth studio album, What Are We Waiting For? (2022), on 18 February 2022. A new version of the song featuring Sparks impacted Christian radio on 31 August 2022, before finally releasing on 7 October 2022. The song was written by Joel Smallbone, Josh Kerr, Luke Smallbone, and Michael Pollack.

"Love Me Like I Am" peaked at number two on the US Hot Christian Songs chart.

== Background ==
On 18 February 2022, For King & Country released "Love Me Like I Am" as the second promotional single from What Are We Waiting For? (2022), accompanied with its music video. concurrently launching the album's pre-order. The song follows the release of 2021 singles "Relate" and "For God Is with Us" as well as the first promotional track, "Unsung Hero." Joel Smallbone shared the story behind the song, saying:

I was sleeping and the phrase ‘Love me Like I Am’ captured me. The following day, we went into a writing session and our producer Josh Kerr added…It’s amazing that you can, Love me like I am. It’s a beautiful story to us—the fact that God can love humanity the way He does, and we can love each other the way we do with unconditional love.

On 27 August 2022, a new version of the song featuring Jordin Sparks exclusively premiered on K-Love radio. This version impacted Christian radio in the United States on 31 August 2022, before finally releasing on 7 October 2022.

== Composition ==
"Love Me Like I Am" is composed in the key of E with a tempo of 80 beats per minute and a musical time signature of 4/4.

== Commercial performance ==
"Love Me Like I Am" debuted at number 38 on the US Hot Christian Songs chart dated 5 March 2022, concurrently charting at number four on the Christian Digital Song Sales chart.

The version of "Love Me Like I Am" with Jordin Sparks debuted at No. 25 on the US Christian Airplay chart dated 10 September 2022, and registered at No. 48 on the Hot Christian Songs chart that same week.

== Music videos ==
The official music video for "Love Me Like I Am" was published on For King & Country's YouTube channel on 18 February 2022. The official lyric video for the song was uploaded on YouTube on 28 February 2022.

== Charts ==
=== Weekly charts ===
Weekly chart performance for "Love Me Like I Am"
Chart (2022–2023)	Peak position
US Adult Contemporary (Billboard)	9
US Adult Pop Airplay (Billboard)	26
US Hot Christian Songs (Billboard)	2
US Christian Airplay (Billboard)	1
US Christian AC (Billboard)	1
US Digital Song Sales (Billboard)	38

=== Year-end charts ===
2022 year-end chart performance for "Love Me Like I Am"
Chart (2022)	Position
US Christian Songs (Billboard)	83

2023 year-end chart performance for "Love Me Like I Am"
Chart (2023)	Position
US Adult Contemporary (Billboard)	15
US Christian Songs (Billboard)	5
US Christian Airplay (Billboard)	6
US Christian AC (Billboard)	12

== Release history ==
Release dates and formats for "Love Me Like I Am"
Region	Date	Version	Format	Label	Ref.
Various	18 February 2022	Album	Digital download; streaming; (promotional release)	Word Entertainment	
United States	31 August 2022	Single (with Jordin Sparks)	Christian radio	Word Entertainment	
United States	7 October 2022	Single (with Jordin Sparks)	Digital download	Word Entertainment	
United States	13 February 2023	Single (with Jordin Sparks)	Hot adult contemporary radio	Curb Records	
