= Kingdom Come (Rebecca St. James song) =

2021 song by Rebecca St. James featuring For King & Country

Single by Rebecca St. James featuring For King & Country

from the album Kingdom Come
- Released: 22 October 2021
- Recorded: 2021
- Genre: Contemporary worship music
- Length: 3:58
- Label: Heritage Music Group
- Songwriters: Joel Smallbone; Luke Smallbone; Rebecca St. James; Seth Mosley
- Producers: Tedd Tjornhom; Seth Mosley

Rebecca St. James singles chronology
"Together (Acoustic Version)" (2020)	"Kingdom Come" (2021)	"Praise" (2022)

For King & Country singles chronology
"For God Is with Us" (2021)	"Kingdom Come" (2021)	"Heavenly Hosts" (2021)

Music video
- "Kingdom Come" on YouTube

"Kingdom Come" is a song performed by Australian Christian pop singer Rebecca St. James featuring Australian Christian pop duo For King & Country. The song was released on 22 October 2021, as the lead single to her tenth studio album, also titled Kingdom Come (2022). St. James co-wrote the song with Joel Smallbone, Luke Smallbone, and Seth Mosley. Tedd Tjornhom and Seth Mosley handled the production of the single.

"Kingdom Come" peaked at No. 34 on the US Hot Christian Songs chart.

== Background ==
On 21 October 2021, Rebecca St. James announced that she would be releasing "Kingdom Come" as her next single, featuring For King & Country, on 22 October 2021. The single was released the following day, with St. James also announcing that it is the lead single to her tenth studio album of the same name, slated for release on 18 February 2022. St. James shared the story behind the song, saying:

When Joel, Luke and I were writing this song we were inspired by the Lord's prayer and the need for revival right now. I believe that there's a desperation that is foundational to every true move of the Spirit. And our world is desperate right now! Great revivalists have said if you want to see revival, draw a circle on the floor, step into it and pray for revival to begin there. Let it start with us!

== Composition ==
"Kingdom Come" is composed in the key of E♭ with a tempo of 108 beats per minute and a musical time signature of 4/4.

== Accolades ==
Year-end lists
Publication	Accolade	Rank	Ref.
365 Days Of Inspiring Media	Top 50 Songs of 2021	31	
365 Days Of Inspiring Media	Top 50 Music Videos of 2021	38	

== Commercial performance ==
In the United States, "Kingdom Come" made its debut at number eight on Billboard's Christian Digital Song Sales chart dated 6 November 2021. It later peaked at number twenty-six on Billboard's Christian Airplay chart and number thirty-four on the Hot Christian Songs chart.

== Music video ==
The official music video of "Kingdom Come" premiered on Rebecca St. James' YouTube channel on 19 November 2021.

== Charts ==
Chart performance for "Kingdom Come"
Chart (2021–2022)	Peak position
US Hot Christian Songs (Billboard)	34
US Christian Airplay (Billboard)	26
US Christian AC (Billboard)	20

== Release history ==
Release history and formats for "Kingdom Come"
Region	Date	Format	Label	Ref.
Various	22 October 2021	Digital download; streaming	Heritage Music Group	
