= Baby Boy =

Baby Boy may refer to:

- A male infant

== Music ==
- "Baby Boy" (Mary Kay Place song), a 1976 song by Mary Kay Place
- "Baby Boy" (Me & My song), a 1995 song by Me & My
- "Baby Boy" (Big Brovaz song), a 2002 song by Big Brovaz
- "Baby Boy" (Beyoncé song), a 2003 song by Beyoncé featuring Sean Paul
- "Baby Boy", a 1969 song by Fred Hughes
- "Baby Boy", a song by C. Jérôme from his 1974 album Baby Boy
- "Baby Boy", a song by Status Quo from their 1977 album Rockin' All Over the World
- "Baby Boy", a song by Whigfield from her 1997 album Whigfield II
- "Baby Boy", a song by Massive Attack featuring Thea from the 2004 soundtrack for Danny the Dog
- "Baby Boy", a song by For King & Country form their 2013 EP Into the Silent Night: The EP
- "Baby Boy", a song by Childish Gambino from his 2016 album "Awaken, My Love!"

== Other uses ==
- Baby Boy (film), a 2001 film by John Singleton and its soundtrack album
- Baby Boy or Charlie Haggers, a character on Mary Hartman, Mary Hartman

== See also ==
- Baby Boy da Prince (born 1983), American rapper
