= What Are We Waiting For? =

Studio album by For King & Country
- Released: 11 March 2022
- Recorded: 2020–2021
- Genres: CCM; Christian alternative rock
- Length: 39:30
- Label: Word Entertainment
- Producers: Tedd T.; Josh Kerr; For King & Country; Jeff Sojka; Federico Vindver; Benjamin Backus; Seth Mosley

For King & Country chronology
A Drummer Boy Christmas (2020)	What Are We Waiting For? (2022)	The Most Beautiful Colours (2026)

Singles from What Are We Waiting For?
- 1. "Together" Released: 1 May 2020; 2. "Relate" Released: 6 August 2021; 3. "For God Is with Us" Released: 24 September 2021

What Are We Waiting For? is the fifth studio album by For King & Country, an Australian Christian pop duo comprising brothers Luke Smallbone and Joel Smallbone, released via Word Entertainment on 11 March 2022. The album contains guest appearances by Dante Bowe, Sleeping at Last, Tori Kelly, and Kirk Franklin. The duo collaborated with Tedd T., Josh Kerr, Jeff Sojka, Federico Vindver, Benjamin Backus, and Seth Mosley in the production of the album.

The album was supported by the release of "Relate" and "For God Is with Us" as singles. Both peaked at No. 1 on the US Hot Christian Songs chart. "Unsung Hero" and "Love Me Like I Am" were released as promotional singles. The album is also being promoted with the What Are We Waiting For? – The Tour, spanning cities across the United States.

The album was a commercial success, launching at No. 7 on the US Billboard 200 with 32,000 equivalent album units sold in its first week, concurrently becoming the duo's first No. 1 entry on Billboard's Christian Albums chart. At the 2022 GMA Dove Awards, What Are We Waiting For? received a GMA Dove Award nomination for Pop/Contemporary Album of the Year, while "Relate" received two nominations for Pop/Contemporary Recorded Song of the Year and Short Form Music Video of the Year (Concept), "For God Is with Us" getting nominated for Short Form Music Video of the Year (Performance), and What Are We Waiting For? | The Worldwide Special getting nominated for Long Form Video of the Year, ultimately winning the Pop/Contemporary Album of the Year, Long Form Video of the Year, and Short Form Video of the Year (Concept) awards.

== Background ==
On 11 October 2021, For King & Country announced that What Are We Waiting For? would be their fifth album, slated for release on 11 March 2022, while also announcing their tour to promote the album. The album contains thirteen original tracks and marks their first full-length project of new music since Burn the Ships (2018). On 7 January 2022, For King & Country released the album track listing accompanying the album pre-order announcement, indicating that previously released singles "Relate" and "For God Is with Us" were included on the album, as well as their 2020 hit single "Together" alongside Tori Kelly and Kirk Franklin. Additional guest appearances on the album included Dante Bowe and Sleeping at Last. What Are We Waiting For? was released on 11 March 2022, with the duo performing songs from the album at the Vines Center during Liberty University's Convocation in Lynchburg, Virginia.

What Are We Waiting For? marks the first time that duo has chosen an album title that does not relate to a track on the album, Joel Smallbone explaining: "First of all, we want the album to be received and digested as an entire piece, rather than as a collection with a title track. But also, because there was something in the question 'what are we waiting for?' that really had pinged Luke and me in the process. And I think it means something different for all of us. My personal 'what are we waiting for?' is that I am waiting for the moment when I'm not waiting for something. And I think that part of the beauty of the question is that you find yourself in it."

On 16 June 2023, the band released the single "What Are We Waiting For?", which had not previously been a track on an album. On 10 August, the band announced the deluxe version of the album alongside the release of the music video for "What Are We Waiting For?". It is released on 15 September, and feature 4 additional songs, including "What Are We Waiting For?", collaborations with Hillary Scott and Jordin Sparks on "For God Is with Us" and "Love Me Like I Am", respectively, and an unreleased track, titled "Better Man".

== Recording, production ==
For King & Country began writing and recording the album in studio full-time in early 2021, as opposed to slotting in sessions while touring and other commitments due to the COVID-19 pandemic, describing their approach to the process as "nine-to-five." Joel Smallbone shared with American Songwriter that he had the initial idea for recording a new album shortly after concluding A Drummer Boy Drive-In: The Christmas Tour, later approaching his brother Luke and began planning. Joel Smallbone said that the decision to include 2020 song "Together" on the album was based on the song having taken years to write, having been initially planned to be part of their 2018 album, Burn the Ships, but they failed to finish it in time.

== Release and promotion ==
=== Singles ===
"Relate" was released on 6 August 2021 as the lead single from the album. The song peaked at No. 1 on the US Hot Christian Songs chart, and No. 6 on the Bubbling Under Hot 100 chart.

"For God Is with Us" was released on 24 September 2021 as the second single from the album, as well as its accompanying music video. The song peaked at No. 3 on the US Hot Christian Songs chart.

=== Promotional singles ===
On 7 January 2022, For King & Country launched the digital pre-order of the album, releasing "Unsung Hero" as an instant grat from the album, accompanied with its music video. "Unsung Hero" peaked at No. 42 on the US Hot Christian Songs chart.

For King & Country released "Love Me Like I Am" as an instant grat from the album on 18 February 2022, accompanied with its music video. "Love Me Like I Am" peaked at No. 38 on the US Hot Christian Songs chart.

=== Other songs ===
The music video for "Broken Halos" was released on 11 March 2022, coinciding with the album's release. "Broken Halos" peaked at No. 37 on the US Hot Christian Songs chart.

=== What Are We Waiting For? | The Worldwide Special ===
On 11 March 2022, For King and Country announced that they will avail an online performance titled What Are We Waiting For? | The Worldwide Special, filmed in the Mojave Desert in California, via Facebook and YouTube on 21 March 2022. On 21 March 2022, the duo announced that the special will premiere on 24 March 2022, partnering with Convoy of Hope for the benefit of Ukrainian people affected by the 2022 Russian invasion of Ukraine. On 27 March 2022, they appeared on Fox & Friends, where they announced that they raised over $150,000 for aiding Ukrainian refugees.

== Reception ==
=== Critical response ===
Professional ratings
Review scores
Source	Rating
365 Days of Inspiring Media	5/5
Jesus Freak Hideout	4.5/5 stars
JubileeCast	4/5
Today's Christian Entertainment	4/5 stars

Jesus Freak Hideout's Alex Caldwell gave a favourable review of the album, saying: "With a sorely needed theme of unity and togetherness in these troubled times, What Are We Waiting For? proves that you can have a few uneven moments (in life, or on an album) and still be wildly uplifting in what you do." Timothy Yap of JubileeCast praised the album, saying, "What Are We Waiting For? is by no means a perfect record, but it's a thematically tight album with a diverse array of songs helping us how we can better relate to each other and God." Kelly Meade, indicating in a positive review at Today's Christian Entertainment, said "Throughout the album, brothers Joel & Luke highlight the need for mercy, peace and being there for people around us to encourage them as they face the challenges of life. The tone of this album feels different from the duos past releases and yet is still unmistakably For King & Country as it presents the messages within the songs as only they can." Reviewing for Plugged In, Kennedy Unthank wrote: "For King & Country's What Are We Waiting For? provides a deep look into how we can deal with the reality of human suffering and fallibility—and its lyrics stay clean throughout. The songs on the album explore various means of coping with pain, whether that be through family and friends, unity and growth or trust in the faithfulness of God." Jonathan Andre in his 365 Days of Inspiring Media review opined that "an album so joyous and life-giving that it's quite possibly one of my favourite albums of this year thus far. Brothers Joel and Luke can do no wrong, and while they are still relatively 'pigeonholed' within the confines and context of CCM over the last decade, hopefully into the future, they can break new moulds and soar to new heights, allowing their music to impact mainstream media as well."

=== Accolades ===
Awards
Year	Organization	Award	Result	Ref
2022	GMA Dove Awards	Pop/Contemporary Album of the Year	Won	
2022	GMA Dove Awards	Long Form Video of the Year (What Are We Waiting For? - The Worldwide Special)	Won	

Year-end lists
Publication	Accolade	Rank	Ref.
Jesus Freak Hideout	2022 Staff Picks: Alex Caldwell's Album Picks	1	
Jesus Freak Hideout	2022 Staff Picks: Wayne Myatt's Album Picks	8	
NewReleaseToday	Best of 2022: Top 10 Albums of the Year	—N/a	

== Touring ==
In the spring of 2022 and 2023, the band embarked on the What Are We Waiting For Tour, with the former year featuring Dante Bowe.

== Commercial performance ==
In the United States, What Are We Waiting For? debuted at No. 7 on the mainstream Billboard 200 chart dated 26 March 2022, earning a total of 32,000 equivalent album units in sales in its first week. This is the duo's second top ten entry on the Billboard 200, following their 2018 album Burn the Ships. The album also debuted at No. 1 on Billboard's Top Christian Albums chart, being their second chart-topping album.

In Australia, What Are We Waiting For? debuted at No. 62 on the ARIA Top 100 Albums Chart for the week commencing 21 March 2022. What Are We Waiting For? launched at No. 3 on the Official Christian & Gospel Albums Chart dated 18–24 March 2022, as published by the Official Charts Company in the United Kingdom. The album also charted on the Swiss Hitparade at No. 83.

== Track listing ==
What Are We Waiting For? track listing
No.	Title	Writer(s)	Producer(s)	Length
1.	"Relate"	Joel Smallbone; Luke Smallbone; Josh Kerr; Tayla Parx	Tedd T.; Josh Kerr; For King & Country	2:53
2.	"Broken Halos"	J. Smallbone; L. Smallbone; Mick Coogan; Kerr	Tedd T.; Kerr; For King & Country	3:12
3.	"Love Me Like I Am"	J. Smallbone; L. Smallbone; Kerr; Michael Pollack	For King & Country; Kerr; Jeff Sojka	3:05
4.	"Unity" (with Dante Bowe)	J. Smallbone; L. Smallbone; Kerr; Antony Williams; Federico Vindver	For King & Country; Kerr; Vindver	3:30
5.	"For God Is with Us"	J. Smallbone; L. Smallbone; Kerr; Jordan Reynolds	For King & Country; Kerr; Tedd T.; Benjamin Backus	3:16
6.	"Hold On Pain Ends"	J. Smallbone; L. Smallbone; Kerr; Reynolds	For King & Country; Kerr; Tedd T.; Backus	2:51
7.	"Unsung Hero"	J. Smallbone; L. Smallbone; Vindver; Seth Mosley	For King & Country; Vindver; Mosley	3:31
8.	"Harmony" (with Sleeping at Last)	J. Smallbone; L. Smallbone; Vindver; Mosley; Matt Hales	For King & Country; Vindver; Mosley	1:12
9.	"Shy"	J. Smallbone; L. Smallbone; Kerr; Taylor Hill	Josh Kerr; Tedd T.; For King & Country	2:53
10.	"Together" (with Tori Kelly and Kirk Franklin)	Franklin; J. Smallbone; L. Smallbone; Ran Jackson; Ricky Jackson; Kerr	Vindver; Kerr; Backus	3:26
11.	"Seasons"	J. Smallbone; L. Smallbone; Kerr; Michael Buzz	Kerr; Tedd T.; For King & Country	3:16
12.	"Cheering You On"	J. Smallbone; L. Smallbone; Kerr; Reynolds	Kerr; Tedd T.; For King & Country	3:23
13.	"Benediction"	J. Smallbone; L. Smallbone; Ran Jackson; Ricky Jackson; Nicolas Balachandran	Kerr	3:02
Total length:				39:30

What Are We Waiting For? + track listing
No.	Title	Writer(s)	Producer(s)	Length
1.	"What Are We Waiting For?"	J. Smallbone; Kerr; L. Smallbone; Sean Douglas	For King & Country; Kerr; Tedd T.	3:14
2.	"Relate"	J. Smallbone; L. Smallbone; Kerr; Parx	Tedd T.; Kerr; For King & Country	2:53
3.	"Broken Halos"	J. Smallbone; L. Smallbone; Coogan; Kerr	Tedd T.; Kerr; For King & Country	3:12
4.	"Love Me Like I Am" (with Jordin Sparks)	J. Smallbone; L. Smallbone; Kerr; Pollack	For King & Country; Kerr; Sojka	3:07
5.	"Unity" (with Dante Bowe)	J. Smallbone; L. Smallbone; Kerr; Antony Williams; Vindver	For King & Country; Kerr; Vindver	3:30
6.	"For God Is with Us" (with Hillary Scott)	J. Smallbone; L. Smallbone; Kerr; Reynolds	For King & Country; Kerr; Tedd T.; Backus	3:19
7.	"Hold On Pain Ends"	J. Smallbone; L. Smallbone; Kerr; Reynolds	For King & Country; Kerr; Tedd T.; Backus	2:51
8.	"Unsung Hero"	J. Smallbone; L. Smallbone; Vindver; Mosley	For King & Country; Vindver; Mosley	3:31
9.	"Harmony" (with Sleeping at Last)	J. Smallbone; L. Smallbone; Vindver; Mosley; Matt Hales	For King & Country; Vindver; Mosley	1:12
10.	"Shy"	J. Smallbone; L. Smallbone; Kerr; Hill	Kerr; Tedd T.; For King & Country	2:53
11.	"Better Man"	Kerr; J. Smallbone; L. Smallbone; Tedd Tjornhom	Kerr; Tedd T.; Dayme	3:09
12.	"Together" (with Tori Kelly and Kirk Franklin)	Franklin; J. Smallbone; L. Smallbone; Ran Jackson; Ricky Jackson; Kerr	Vindver; Kerr; Backus	3:26
13.	"Seasons"	J. Smallbone; L. Smallbone; Kerr; Buzz	Kerr; Tedd T.; For King & Country	3:16
14.	"Cheering You On"	J. Smallbone; L. Smallbone; Kerr; Reynolds	Kerr; Tedd T.; For King & Country	3:23
15.	"Benediction"	J. Smallbone; L. Smallbone; Ra. Jackson; Ri. Jackson; Balachandran	Kerr	3:02
16.	"Love Me Like I Am"	J. Smallbone; L. Smallbone; Kerr; Pollack	For King & Country; Kerr; Sojka	3:04
17.	"For God Is with Us"	J. Smallbone; L. Smallbone; Kerr; Reynolds	For King & Country; Kerr; Tedd T.; Backus	3:16
Total length:				52:10

== Charts ==
=== Weekly charts ===
Weekly chart performance for What Are We Waiting For?
Chart (2022)	Peak position
Australian Albums (ARIA)	62
Swiss Albums (Schweizer Hitparade)	81
UK Album Downloads (Official Charts)	43
UK Christian & Gospel Albums (OCC)	4
US Billboard 200	7
US Top Christian Albums (Billboard)	1
US Independent Albums (Billboard)	3

=== Year-end charts ===
Year-end chart performance for What Are We Waiting For?
Chart (2022)	Position
US Christian Albums (Billboard)	11
Chart (2023)	Position
US Christian Albums (Billboard)	19

== Release history ==
Release history and formats for What Are We Waiting For?
Region	Date	Format	Label	Ref.
Various	11 March 2022	CD; digital download; streaming; vinyl	Word Entertainment	
