= Dawn (Rebecca St. James EP) =

2020 EP by Rebecca St. James

EP by Rebecca St. James
- Released: July 24, 2020
- Genre: CCM
- Length: 26:40
- Label: Heritage
- Producer: Tedd Tjornhom; Seth Mosley

Rebecca St. James chronology
I Will Praise You (2011)	Dawn (2020)	Kingdom Come (2022)

Singles from Dawn
- 1. "Battle Is the Lord's (feat. Brandon Lake)" Released: June 12, 2020

Dawn is the fifth extended play (EP) by Rebecca St. James. Released on July 24, 2020, Dawn is St. James' first studio recording in nine years and her first with Heritage Music Group. The EP was preceded by the single "Battle Is the Lord's", which was released on June 12, 2020, and features recording artist Brandon Lake.

== Background and development ==
After several years of musical hiatus, St. James recorded and released a cover of "Amazing Grace", with her brothers Joel and Luke Smallbone of the band for King & Country. The song was released in October 2017. She also toured with for King & Country and Casting Crowns on a Christmas tour.

St. James later joined the "Greatest Hits Live" tour from November 2018 and continued through May 2019, with Point of Grace, Avalon, Nicole C. Mullen, Bob Carlisle and NewSong. On 10 January 2019, St. James announced that she was writing music for a new album with frequent collaborator Tedd T. and that she had signed with Heritage Music Group, an imprint of Bethel Music. On 29 April 2020, St. James announced via Facebook live that her new album would be titled Dawn, although she later clarified in an Instagram post that Dawn would be an EP rather than a full-length record.

== Critical reception ==
Professional ratings
Review scores
Source	Rating
Today's Christian Entertainment	4.5/5 stars
Jesus Freak Hideout	3.5/5 stars
JubileeCast	2.5/5 stars

Dawn received mixed reviews from critics. Jesus Freak Hideout gave the album 3.5 out of 5 stars, saying "All things considered, it's a good album, bordering on solid if you like the genre, and at the very least a welcome comeback from a beloved CCM voice." Today's Christian Entertainment gave the album 4.5 out of 5 stars, writing "...Rebecca’s soothing vocals combined with the beautifully arranged music make this EP a must add to your playlists and a perfect companion to spending quiet time with our Savior." Conversely, JubileeCast gave the album 2.5 out of 5 stars, writing "After a nine year wait, Dawn doesn't sound like a Rebecca St. James record. It sounds like a contemporary composite worship record made by her producers with St. James as the guest vocalist."

== Singles ==
The EP's sole single, "Battle Is the Lord's", was released on 12 June 2020 and features guest artist Brandon Lake. It peaked at 48 on the Billboard Christian Songs chart, 34 on the Christian Airplay chart, and 24 on the Christian Digital Song Sales chart. A live version of the single was released on 28 March 2021.

== Track listing ==
Credits adapted from Dawn's Spotify metadata.

No.	Title	Writer(s)	Producer(s)	Length
1.	"Prelude"	Seth Mosley; Tedd Tjornhom	Mosley; Tjornhom	0:26
2.	"Middle of the Fire" (with Josh Baldwin)	Baldwin; Rebecca St. James; Tjornhom	Tjornhom; Mosley	3:46
3.	"Ready for the Rain"	Chris Davenport; St. James; Tjornhom	Tjornhom; Mosley	4:34
4.	"Fall Back"	Jonathan Smith; Mosley; Mia Fieldes; St. James	Mosley	4:12
5.	"Dawn" (with Luke Smallbone)	Mosley; Smallbone; St. James; Tjornhom	Tjornhom	4:57
6.	"Battle Is the Lord's" (with Brandon Lake)	Heath Balltzglier; St. James; Seth Condrey; Tjornhom	Tjornhom; Mosley	3:55
7.	"Alleluia Jesus"	Kristene Dimarco; St. James; Tjornhom	Tjornhom	4:46
