= Kingdom Come (Rebecca St. James album) =

Studio album by Rebecca St. James
- Released: March 25, 2022
- Studio: Full Circle Music; Sound Kitchen Studios; FleauxMotion Studios (Nashville and Franklin)
- Genre: CCM
- Length: 48:19
- Label: Heritage
- Producer: Tedd Tjornhom; Seth Mosley; David Leonard; Brad King; Seth Talley

Rebecca St. James chronology
Dawn (2020)	Kingdom Come (2022)

Singles from Kingdom Come
- 1. "Kingdom Come" Released: October 22, 2021; 2. "Praise" Released: February 18, 2022

Kingdom Come is the tenth studio album by Rebecca St. James, released on March 25, 2022. Kingdom Come was St. James' first full-length studio album in eleven years and her first with Heritage Music Group. The album was preceded by two singles: "Kingdom Come", which was released on October 22, 2021 and features her brothers' Christian pop duo, for KING & COUNTRY, and "Praise", which was released on February 18, 2022.

== Background and development ==
On January 10, 2019, St. James announced that she was writing music for a new album with frequent collaborator Tedd T. and that she had signed with Heritage Music Group, an imprint of Bethel Music. St. James' first project with Heritage Music Group was an extended play, Dawn, which was released on July 24, 2020. All seven tracks from Dawn also appear on the track listing for Kingdom Come.

== Critical reception ==
Professional ratings
Review scores
Source	Rating
365 Days of Inspiring Media	4.5/5 stars
JubileeCast	2.5/5 stars
Today’s Christian Entertainment	4.5/5 stars

Jonathan Andre of 365 Days of Inspiring Media gave the album 4.5 out of 5 stars, writing “This is a must-have if you love Rebecca’s music of the past, or if you are into some nostalgia from yesteryear, or both.” He named the title track, “Battle Is the Lord’s” and “Praise” as album highlights. Kelly Meade of Today’s Christian Entertainment also awarded the album 4.5 out of 5 stars, writing “As a whole, this album stands out both musically and with strong vocal performances throughout.” In a more negative review, Timothy Yap of JubileeCast gave the album 2.5 out of 5 stars, writing "Instead of letting her own identity to shine, she has tried to fit in with her brothers (the famed For King & Country) by crafting a sanitized CCM pop offering." He named "Desert Bloom," "Traveling Light," and "Fall Back" as album highlights.

== Chart performance ==
The album did not chart on any Billboard music charts. It is her first studio album since 1991’s Refresh My Heart to not chart on the Top Christian Albums chart and her first studio album since 2005’s If I Had One Chance to Tell You Something to not chart on the Billboard 200.

== Singles ==
The album's lead single and title track, "Kingdom Come", was released on October 22, 2021 and features her brothers' duo, For King & Country. It peaked at number eight on the Billboard Christian Digital Song Sales chart, number 26 on the Billboard Christian Airplay chart, and number 34 on the Billboard Hot Christian Songs chart.

The album's second single, "Praise", was released on February 18, 2022, along with the album's pre-order.

Track six, "Battle Is the Lord's", was previously released as the lead single for Dawn.

== Track listing ==
No.	Title	Writer(s)	Producer(s)	Length
1.	"Prelude"	Seth Mosley; Tedd Tjornhom	Mosley; Tjornhom	0:26
2.	"Middle of the Fire" (with Josh Baldwin)	Baldwin; Rebecca St. James; Tjornhom	Tjornhom; Mosley	3:46
3.	"Kingdom Come" (with For King & Country)	Mosley; Joel Smallbone; Luke Smallbone; St. James	Tjornhom; Mosley	3:58
4.	"Ready for the Rain"	Chris Davenport; St. James; Tjornhom	Tjornhom; Mosley	4:34
5.	"Dawn" (with Luke Smallbone)	Mosley; Smallbone; St. James; Tjornhom	Tjornhom	4:57
6.	"Battle Is the Lord's" (with Brandon Lake)	Heath Balltzglier; St. James; Seth Condrey; Tjornhom	Tjornhom; Mosley	3:55
7.	"Desert Bloom" (with kalley)	kalley; St. James; Tjornhom	Tjornhom	4:19
8.	"Fall Back"	Jonathan Smith; Mosley; Mia Fieldes; St. James	Mosley	4:12
9.	"Traveling Light"	St. James; Mosley	Mosley	3:46
10.	"Alleluia Jesus"	Kristene Dimarco; St. James; Tjornhom	Tjornhom	4:46
11.	"Praise"	Brian Johnson; Phil Wickham; St. James; Tjornhom	Tjornhom; Mosley	4:53
12.	"Cover Me"	St. James; David Leonard; Tjornhom	Leonard; Brad King; Seth Talley	4:41

== Personnel ==
Credits taken from the album's liner notes.

- Rebecca St. James – lead vocals
- Cubbie Fink – executive producer, background vocals, bass, electric guitar, executive video producer, videographer
- Tedd Tjornhom – production, recording, editing, piano, synths, string arrangements, programming
- Seth Mosley – production, recording, editing, background vocals, bass, electric guitar, piano, synths, string arrangements, programming
- David Leonard – production, background vocals
- Brad King – production
- Seth Talley – production, mixing
- David Smallbone – management
- Josh Smallbone – management
- Ashley Munn – management
- Jake Halm – recording, editing, background vocals, synths, string arrangements, programming
- X O'Connor – recording, editing, mixing
- Joe Henderson – editing
- Steven Servi – editing
- Alex Zwart – editing
- Crystal O'Connor – editing
- Doug Weier – mixing
- Joe Laporte – mastering
- Joel Smallbone – guest vocals (track 3), background vocals
- Luke Smallbone – guest vocals (tracks 3, 5), background vocals, drums
- Seth Condrey – background vocals
- Gemma Fink – background vocals
- Madeline Halm – background vocals
- Setnick Sene – background vocals
- Janae Shaw – background vocals
- Brandon Lake – guest vocals (track 6)
- Josh Baldwin – guest vocals (track 2)
- Kalley Heiligenthal – guest vocals (track 7)
- Austin Davis – drums
- Teddy Boldt – drums
- Garrett Tyler – drums
- Vincent DiCarlo – bass
- Daniel Waterbury – electric guitar
- Mark Campbell – electric guitar, synths, string arrangements, programming
- Benjamin Backus – piano
- Cara Fox – synths, string arrangements, programming
- Eleanore Denig – synths, string arrangements, programming
- Daniel Lopez – synths, string arrangements, programming
- Chris Estes – senior A&R director
- Adrian Thompson – A&R director
- Eric Allen – A&R manager
- David Whitworth – A&R manager
- Anna Reed – music production project manager
- Erica Boutwell – music production director
- Christian Ostrom – creative director
- Tommy Muller – marketing manager
- Daniel Byun – marketing manager
- Stephen James Hart – art director and designer
- Dario Prieto – art director and designer
- Robby Klein – director of photography, photography
- Mitchell Schleper – executive video producer, videographer

== Release history ==
Region	Date	Format	Label
Various	March 25, 2022	CD, digital download, streaming	Heritage Records
