= Into the Silent Night: The EP =

EP by for King & Country
- Released: 22 October 2013
- Genres: Contemporary Christian music, Christian rock, pop rock, Christmas music
- Length: 18:05
- Label: Fervent

Into the Silent Night: The EP is a Christmas extended play from Australian Christian pop duo for King & Country. Fervent Records released the EP on 22 October 2013.

== Critical reception ==
Professional ratings
Review scores
| Source | Rating |
|---|---|
| CCM Magazine | 3/5 stars |
| Cross Rhythms | 8/10 squares |
| Indie Vision Music | 4/5 stars |
| Jesus Freak Hideout | 4/5 stars |
| Louder Than the Music | 4/5 stars |
| New Release Today | 4.5/5 stars |

Awarding the EP three stars for CCM Magazine, Matt Conner says, "a quick holiday offering makes sense to tide fans over." Tony Cummings, indicating in an eight out of ten review by Cross Rhythms, writes, "No doubt this will be selling well over the next few Christmases." Giving the album four stars at Jesus Freak Hideout, Michael Weaver states, "Into the Silent Night has two solid originals and two well-crafted covers for your enjoyment." Jonathan J. Francesco, signaling in a four and a half star review from New Release Today, describes, "it's truly refreshing to see a release that is not only musically memorable and enjoyable from start to finish, but one that also manages to keep Christ the prime focus throughout." Rating the album four stars at Indie Vision Music, Jonathan Andre responds, "Fervent Records-signed band continue to marvel and amaze whoever listens to them, and this Christmas EP is no different." Jono Davies, assigning the album four stars from Louder Than the Music, replies, "[its] a great alternative Christmas album."

== Track listing ==
| No. | Title | Writer(s) | Length |
|---|---|---|---|
| 1. | "Angels We Have Heard on High" | | 3:48 |
| 2. | "Baby Boy" | for King & Country, Seth Mosley | 3:40 |
| 3. | "Into the Silent Night" | for King & Country, Matt Hammitt, Mosley | 3:18 |
| 4. | "Little Drummer Boy" | Katherine K. Davis, Henry Onorati, Harry Simeone | 3:35 |
| 5. | "Baby Boy" (live) | for King & Country, Mosley | 3:44 |
| Total length: | | | 18:05 |

== Chart performance ==
| Chart (2013) | Peak position |
|---|---|
| US Top Christian Albums (Billboard) | 5 |
