= Like a Country Song =

- Directed by: Johnny Remo
- Written by: Daniel Backman; Johnny Remo
- Produced by: Daniel Backman; Allan Camaisa; Megan Camaisa; Jamie Creasy Jr; Dale Gibson; Tammy Hyler; Johnny; Remo Nils Allen Stewart; Kim Waltrip
- Starring: Billy Ray Cyrus; Jennifer Taylor; Kerry Knuppe
- Cinematography: Rudy Harbon
- Edited by: Ken Conrad
- Music by: Tammy Hyler; Fred Williams
- Production company: Skipstone Pictures
- Distributed by: CMD Distribution
- Release date: September 9, 2014
- Running time: 100 minutes
- Country: United States
- Language: English

Like a Country Song is a 2014 Christian drama film starring Billy Ray Cyrus and Jennifer Taylor. The film released on September 9, 2014, by CMD Distribution. The film also stars Kerry Knuppe, Joel Smallbone.

== Cast ==
- Billy Ray Cyrus as Bo Reeson
- Joel Smallbone as Jake Reeson
- Jennifer Taylor as Mia Reeson
- Kerry Knuppe as Becca
- Booboo Stewart as Bobby
- Larry Gatlin as Buck
- Gregory Alan Williams as Reggie
- Fivel Stewart as Nikki
- Madelyn Deutch as Zoey

== Reception ==
ChristianReview.com rated the film at 4 out of 5 stars stating: "Like A County Song is a great movie. It looks good thanks to some good lighting, camerawork, and post production color correcting, making this a movie that would play well on both at the theater and on a TV screen." The Dove Foundation said "This movie clearly illustrates the realities of life but also the hope one has in following God." Christian Cinema also gave the film 4 stars out of 5 stating "Make no mistake, this is a story about healing, forgiveness and redemption..." Ted Baehr of Movieguide rated the film with three stars out of four saying "Like A Country Song has many positive, faith affirming moments. It shows the freedom that forgiveness gives, not just in forgiving others of their mistakes, but accepting Christ’s forgiveness of our mistakes. A beautiful portrayal of the Gospel, repentance and reconciliation are properly displayed. Light caution is still advised for Like A Country Song, due to some minor violence and heavy drinking."
