= What Are We Waiting For Tour =

2022–23 concert tour by For King & Country

- Tour by For King & Country
- Promotional poster for the tour
- Associated album: What Are We Waiting For?
- Start date: 31 March 2022
- End date: 31 May 2023
- Legs: 2
- No. of shows: 65

For King & Country concert chronology
- Relate 2021 Tour (2021); What Are We Waiting For Tour (2022–2023); The Homecoming Tour (2024)

The What Are We Waiting For Tour was the tenth headlining tour by Australian christian rock band For King & Country. The tour is in support of their 2022 album What Are We Waiting For?, and toured only the United States and Canada.

== Background ==
On 11 October 2021, For King & Country announced that they will be embarking on the What Are We Waiting For? – The Tour, in the spring of 2022. The duo was joined by Dante Bowe on said tour. The tour spanned 32 dates across arenas in the United States, commencing at the Landers Center in Southaven, Mississippi, on 31 March 2022, and concluding at the FirstBank Amphitheater in Franklin, Tennessee on 22 May 2022.

On 31 October 2022, the duo announced that they would be embarking on a second tour showcasing the album, titled What Are We Waiting For Tour: Part II. The tour will span 32 dates across locations in the United States and Canada, and commenced at the Neal S. Blaisdell Center in Honolulu, Hawaii on 25 March 2023, and concluded at the Queen Elizabeth Theatre in Vancouver in Canada on 31 May 2023.

== Tour dates ==
List of 2022 concerts, showing date, city, state, venue, and opening acts
Date	City	Country	Venue	Opening act(s)
31 March 2022	Southaven	United States	Landers Center	Dante Bowe
1 April 2022	Hoffman Estates	United States	Now Arena	Dante Bowe
2 April 2022	Ypsilanti	United States	George Gervin GameAbove Center	Dante Bowe
3 April 2022	Pittsburgh	United States	Petersen Events Center	Dante Bowe
7 April 2022	Salisbury	United States	Wicomico Civic Arena	Dante Bowe
8 April 2022	Asheville	United States	Harrah's Cherokee Center	Dante Bowe
9 April 2022	Charlottesville	United States	John Paul Jones Arena	Dante Bowe
14 April 2022	Jackson	United States	Mississippi Coliseum	Dante Bowe
15 April 2022	Knoxville	United States	Knoxville Civic Coliseum	Dante Bowe
16 April 2022	Charlotte	United States	Bojangles Coliseum	Dante Bowe
21 April 2022	Champaign	United States	State Farm Center	Dante Bowe
22 April 2022	Springfield	United States	JQH Arena	Dante Bowe
23 April 2022	Highland Heights	United States	BB&T Arena	Dante Bowe
24 April 2022	Reading	United States	Santander Arena	Dante Bowe
26 April 2022	Portland	United States	Cross Insurance Arena	Dante Bowe
28 April 2022	Springfield	United States	MassMutual Center	Dante Bowe
29 April 2022	Binghamton	United States	Visions Veterans Memorial Arena	Dante Bowe
30 April 2022	Fairfax	United States	EagleBank Arena	Dante Bowe
1 May 2022	Salem	United States	Salem Civic Center	Dante Bowe
5 May 2022	Phoenix	United States	GCU Arena	Dante Bowe
6 May 2022	Fresno	United States	Save Mart Center	Dante Bowe
7 May 2022	Anaheim	United States	Honda Center	Dante Bowe
8 May 2022	Sacramento	United States	Golden 1 Center	Dante Bowe
12 May 2022	Portland	United States	Portland Memorial Coliseum	Dante Bowe
13 May 2022	Spokane	United States	Spokane Arena	Dante Bowe
14 May 2022	Everett	United States	Angel of the Winds Arena	Dante Bowe
15 May 2022	Boise	United States	ExtraMile Arena	Dante Bowe
17 May 2022	Las Vegas	United States	Orleans Arena	Dante Bowe
19 May 2022	Albuquerque	United States	Tingley Coliseum	Dante Bowe
20 May 2022	Amarillo	United States	Amarillo Civic Center	Dante Bowe
21 May 2022	Rogers	United States	Walmart Arkansas Music Pavilion	Dante Bowe
22 May 2022	Franklin	United States	FirstBank Amphitheater	Dante Bowe

List of 2023 concerts, showing date, city, state, venue, and opening acts
Date	City	Country	Venue	Opening act(s)
25 March 2023	Honolulu	United States	Blaisdell Arena	—
5 April 2023	Ashwaubenon (Note: Listed as Green Bay in promotional material.)	United States	Resch Center	—
6 April 2023	Moline	United States	Vibrant Arena at The MARK	—
7 April 2023	Columbus	United States	Nationwide Arena	—
8 April 2023	Columbia	United States	Colonial Life Arena	—
13 April 2023	Biloxi	United States	Mississippi Coast Coliseum	—
14 April 2023	Bossier City	United States	Brookshire Grocery Arena	—
15 April 2023	Belton	United States	Bell County Expo Center	—
16 April 2023	Corpus Christi	United States	American Bank Center	—
20 April 2023	Rochester	United States	Blue Cross Arena	—
21 April 2023	Albany	United States	MVP Arena	—
22 April 2023	Norfolk	United States	Chartway Arena	—
23 April 2023	Wallingford	United States	Toyota Oakdale Theatre	—
27 April 2023	Jonesboro	United States	First National Bank Arena	—
28 April 2023	Park City	United States	Hartman Arena	—
29 April 2023	Dodge City	United States	United Wireless Arena	—
30 April 2023	Omaha	United States	Baxter Arena	—
2 May 2023	El Paso	United States	El Paso County Coliseum	—
4 May 2023	San Angelo	United States	Foster Communications Coliseum	—
5 May 2023	College Station	United States	Reed Arena	—
6 May 2023	Beaumont	United States	Ford Park	—
7 May 2023	Lubbock	United States	United Supermarkets Arena	—
11 May 2023	Savannah	United States	Enmarket Arena	—
12 May 2023	West Palm Beach	United States	ITHINK Financial Amphitheatre	—
13 May 2023	Macon	United States	Macon Coliseum	—
14 May 2023	Huntsville	United States	The Orion Amphitheater	—
24 May 2023	Winnipeg	Canada	Centennial Concert Hall	—
25 May 2023	Saskatoon	Canada	Elim Church	—
26 May 2023	Edmonton	Canada	Christcity	—
27 May 2023 (Note: 2 shows.)	Edmonton	Canada	Christcity	—
29 May 2023	Calgary	Canada	Winsport	—
31 May 2023	Vancouver	Canada	Queen Elizabeth Theatre	—
