= Heavenly Hosts =

2020 song by For King & Country

Single by For King & Country

from the album A Drummer Boy Christmas
- Released: 3 November 2021
- Genre: CCM; Christmas music
- Length: 3:47
- Label: Word Entertainment
- Songwriters: Benjamin Backus; Joel Smallbone; Luke Smallbone; Matt Hales; Tedd Tjornhom; Tony Wood
- Producers: Benjamin Backus; For King & Country; Tedd Tjornhom

For King & Country singles chronology
"Kingdom Come" (2021)	"Heavenly Hosts" (2021)	"Love Me Like I Am" (2022)

Music videos
- "Heavenly Hosts" on YouTube
- "Heavenly Hosts" (Acoustic) on YouTube
- "Heavenly Hosts" (Lyrics) on YouTube

"Heavenly Hosts" is a song performed by an Australian Christian pop duo For King & Country. The song impacted Christian radio in the United States on 3 November 2021, becoming the third single from A Drummer Boy Christmas (2020). The song was written by Benjamin Backus, Joel Smallbone, Luke Smallbone, Matt Hales, Tedd Tjornhom, and Tony Wood.

"Heavenly Hosts" peaked at No. 16 on the US Hot Christian Songs chart.

== Background ==
On 16 October 2020, For King & Country released "Heavenly Hosts" as the second and final promotional single from A Drummer Boy Christmas (2020), accompanied with a lyric video. For King & Country shared the story behind the song, saying:

Writing an original Christmas song is a bit of a daunting task, but we were always very intrigued by what it looked like when the angels met the shepherds. What did it look like, and what was being said? One of the beautiful storylines of the song is that the simple shepherds were the first ones to see the beautiful spectacle in the sky, and we thought it would be an appropriate story to tell through song for A Drummer Boy Christmas.

== Composition ==
"Heavenly Hosts" composed in the key of A with a tempo of 109 beats per minute and a musical time signature of 4/4.

== Commercial performance ==
"Heavenly Hosts" debuted at number 48 on the US Hot Christian Songs dated 12 December 2020. The song peaked at number 16 spent a total of six non-consecutive weeks on the chart.

== Music videos ==
The official lyric video of the song was released on 16 October 2020, also on For King & Country's YouTube channel. The music video of "Heavenly Hosts" was released by For King & Country via YouTube on 27 November 2020. On 17 December 2020, For King & Country released the acoustic performance video of the song through YouTube.

== Charts ==
Chart performance for "Heavenly Hosts"
Chart (2020–2022)	Peak position
US Hot Christian Songs (Billboard)	16
US Christian Airplay (Billboard)	2
US Christian AC (Billboard)	2

== Release history ==
Release history and formats for "Heavenly Hosts"
Region	Date	Format	Label	Ref.
Various	16 October 2020	Digital download; streaming; (promotional release)	Word Entertainment	
United States	3 November 2021	Christian radio	Word Entertainment	
