= Crave (For King & Country album) =

Studio album by For King & Country
- Released: 28 February 2012
- Recorded: 2011–2012
- Genre: Contemporary Christian music, Christian rock
- Length: 41:47
- Label: Fervent/Curb
- Producer: Ben Glover, Matt Hales, Shaun Shankel

For King & Country chronology
For King & Country: The EP (2011)	Crave (2012)	Run Wild. Live Free. Love Strong. (2014)

Crave is the first studio album by contemporary Christian duo For King & Country, released on 28 February 2012 by Fervent-Curb Records.

== Recording ==
The album was recorded at several different studios in California and Nashville, Tennessee. The album reworks versions of "Missing", "Sane" and "Love's to Blame" which the band had recorded earlier.

== Critical reception ==
Professional ratings
Review scores
Source	Rating
Christianity Today	2/5 stars
Cross Rhythms	8/10 squares
Indie Vision Music	3/5 stars
Jesus Freak Hideout	4/5 stars 4.5/5 stars
New Release Tuesday	5/5 stars
Out Housers	3.5/5 stars

Cross Rhythms' Simon Eden said "as a rock album, this is quite a man's man album - powerful stadium rock with a sound like a roaring inferno."

Indie Vision Music's Jonathan Andre said "Crave is not your cliché album, and I was very intrigued to listen to it, to see if their sounds on the album were similar to that of their sister, Rebecca." Furthermore, Andre wrote "though not a perfect album, this is a solid one from two Australians that will definitely go far in the American industry!"

Jesus Freak Hideout's Ryan Barbee said "at first listen, I was honestly expecting something unappealing and typical. I was pleasantly surprised and happily repented of my negative predisposition. The brothers have truly offered a well-crafted album in Crave, and have given listeners something fresh to hear. The lyrics have depth, the music has energy and it is balanced wonderfully. If this is how they begin, I will definitely be craving more fine songs in the future from for King & Country."

Jesus Freak Hideout's Michael Weaver said "Crave is full of soaring melodies as well as a stunning mix of guitars, piano, strings, keyboard, and electronic effects." In addition, Weaver wrote "Crave has something great to offer at nearly every turn." Weaver summed up "Crave, as a whole is nothing short of brilliant."

Christianity Today's Lisa Ann Cockrel said "Crave is full of hopeful anthems that ratify For King and Country's earnest moniker." However, Cockrel wrote "More grit would have served the project well. Most tracks start with some creative promise, only to devolve into generic riffs."

New Release Tuesday's Sarah Fine said "Crave is hands-down one of the best debut projects I've heard from a group in years. Creative, poignant and moving, it comes from a very raw place of heartache and hope, never backing down from the honest truth, yet never shying away from the restoration found in Christ. Musically, it's unlike anything in the genre right now. Haunting, playful and deep all at once, it could quite easily beat out many of its mainstream counterparts." New Release Tuesday's Jonathan Francesco said "Crave is destined to be a classic and will hopefully prove to have legs and land on many year-end lists despite its early release."

Out Housers' Jeremy Shane said "because of the pop sound, I find all of their album to be pretty listenable, and there's nothing on it I really hate. Although also because of this some of my favorite songs on Crave are probably the less poppy and more unique sounding songs." The reason for the low score is because Shane only considers that "there are two or three songs on it that will be added into my regular playlists in my own music." Lastly, Shane wrote "I'd recommend this album to anyone into light or pop rock."

== Track listing ==
No.	Title	Writer(s)	Producer	Length
1.	"Light it Up"	Matt Hales, Joel Smallbone, Luke Smallbone	Matt Hales	3:31
2.	"The Proof of Your Love"	Ben Glover, Jonathan Lee, J. Smallbone, L. Smallbone, Fred Williams, Mia Fieldes	Ben Glover	3:17
3.	"Missing"	Glover, J. Smallbone, L. Smallbone	Shaun Shankel	4:16
4.	"Busted Heart (Hold On to Me)"	Glover, J. Smallbone, L. Smallbone, Jenna Torres	Glover	3:18
5.	"People Change"	Chris Antblad, Glover	Shankel	3:53
6.	"Middle of Your Heart"	Glover, J. Smallbone, L. Smallbone	Glover	3:21
7.	"Love's to Blame"	Rebecca St. James, J. Smallbone, L. Smallbone	Shankel	4:27
8.	"Fine Fine Life"	Ran Jackson, Ricky Jackson, J. Smallbone, L. Smallbone	Shankel	3:40
9.	"Sane"	Tyler Hayes, J. Smallbone, L. Smallbone	Shankel	3:43
10.	"Pushing on a Pull Door"	Hales, J. Smallbone, L. Smallbone	Hales	3:56
11.	"Crave"	Shaun Shankel, J. Smallbone, L. Smallbone	Hales	4:25
Total length:				41:47

An expanded edition was released in 2013 containing two additional songs: "The Proof of Your Love [The Monologue Mix]" and "Hope Is What We Crave".

== Charts ==
Chart performance for Crave
Chart (2012)	Peak position
US Billboard 200	128
US Top Christian Albums (Billboard)	4
