= Journey to Bethlehem =

- Theatrical release poster
- Directed by: Adam Anders
- Written by: Adam Anders; Peter Barsocchini
- Produced by: Adam Anders; Brandt Andersen; Steve Barnett; Ryan Busse; Stephen Meinen; Alan Powell
- Starring: Fiona Palomo; Milo Manheim; Lecrae; Joel Smallbone; Antonio Banderas
- Cinematography: Xavi Giménez
- Edited by: Sabrina Plisco
- Music by: Adam Anders; Nikki Anders; Peer Åström
- Production company: Affirm Films; Monarch Media; SPACE + ART Entertainment; Night Light
- Distributed by: Sony Pictures Releasing
- Release date: November 10, 2023 (United States)
- Running time: 98 minutes
- Country: United States
- Language: English
- Budget: $6 million
- Box office: $7.9 million

Journey to Bethlehem is a 2023 American Christmas musical film directed by Adam Anders in his feature-length directorial debut. Written by Anders and Peter Barsocchini, the film stars Milo Manheim in his feature film debut and Fiona Palomo as Joseph and Mary, with Antonio Banderas as King Herod.

== Premise ==
A young woman carrying an unimaginable responsibility. A young man torn between love and honor. A jealous king who will stop at nothing to keep his crown. This live-action Christmas musical celebration for the entire family, weaves classic Christmas melodies in to new pop songs in a music-infused retelling of the timeless story of Mary and Joseph and the birth of Jesus.

== Cast ==
- Fiona Palomo as Mary
- Milo Manheim as Joseph
- Omid Djalili as Melchior
- Rizwan Manji as Gaspar
- Geno Segers as Balthazar
- Moriah Smallbone as Deborah (mononymously credited as Mōriah)
- Joel Smallbone as Antipater
- Lecrae as Gabriel
- Stephanie Gil as Rebekah
- Antonio Cantos as Joachim
- María Pau Pigem as Ana
- Alicia Borrachero as Rachel
- Antonio Gil as Jacob
- Antonio Banderas as Herod the Great

== Production ==
The film and its cast was announced in March 2023, with newcomer Fiona Palomo as Mary, Zombies star Milo Manheim as Joseph, and Antonio Banderas as Herod the Great. Shooting locations included the Santa Bárbara Castle in Alicante, and the Tabernas Desert and Paraje El Chorrillo in Almeria..

=== Music ===
The following soundtrack was released on Nov 3, 2023. The deluxe version containing the original score was released on November 24, 2023. Meanwhile, the soundtrack album edition with instrumental music was released one year later on November 29, 2024.

Track listing
No.	Title	Length
1.	"O Come, O Come, Emmanuel"	0:18
2.	"Journey to Bethlehem"	1:47
3.	"Mary's Getting Married"	3:34
4.	"Good to be King"	2:57
5.	"Can We Make This Work"	2:46
6.	"Mother To A Savior and King"	3:54
7.	"The Ultimate Deception"	2:55
8.	"Three Wise Guys"	2:34
9.	"We Become We"	2:08
10.	"In My Blood"	2:54
11.	"The Nativity Song"	4:04
12.	"Brand New Life"	3:27
Total length:		33:24

== Release ==
Journey to Bethlehem was theatrically released on November 10, 2023, by Sony Pictures and Affirm Films. A teaser trailer premiered in front of Affirm's Big George Foreman, before being released on YouTube.

The film was released on digital platforms on December 8, 2023, followed by a Blu-ray and DVD release on January 16, 2024.

== Reception ==
=== Box office ===
In the United States and Canada, Journey to Bethlehem was released alongside The Marvels, and was projected to gross $1–3 million from 1,823 theaters in its opening weekend. The film made $1 million on its first day, including $250,000 from Thursday night previews. It went on to debut to $2.4 million, finishing in seventh.

=== Critical response ===
On the review aggregator website Rotten Tomatoes, 75% of 24 critics' reviews are positive, with an average rating of 6.3/10. The website's consensus reads: "Journey to Bethlehem adds a solidly traditional and surprisingly fun – albeit occasionally treacly – entry to the lengthy list of Nativity films." Audiences polled by CinemaScore gave the film an average grade of "A–" on A+ to F scale, while those surveyed by PostTrak gave it an 81% positive score. In 2024, it was awarded the Epiphany Prize® for Inspiring Movies by Movieguide at the Movieguide Awards.

== See also ==
- List of Christmas films
- List of films about angels
