= Relate (song) =

2021 song by For King & Country

Single by For King & Country

from the album What Are We Waiting For?
- Released: 6 August 2021
- Length: 2:53
- Label: Word Entertainment
- Songwriter(s): Josh Kerr; Joel Smallbone; Luke Smallbone; Tayla Parx
- Producer(s): Josh Kerr; Tedd T.; For King & Country

For King & Country singles chronology
"Amen" (2021)	"Relate" (2021)	"For God Is with Us" (2021)

R3hab remix
- R3hab remix cover

Music videos
- "Relate" on YouTube
- "Relate" (Live) on YouTube
- "Relate" (Lyrics) on YouTube

"Relate" (stylised in uppercase) is a song performed by an Australian Christian pop duo For King & Country. The song was released as the lead single from their fifth studio album, What Are We Waiting For? (2022), on 6 August 2021. The song was written by Josh Kerr, Joel Smallbone, Luke Smallbone and Tayla Parx.

"Relate" peaked at No. 1 on the US Hot Christian Songs chart, and No. 6 on the Bubbling Under Hot 100 chart. The song was ranked by Billboard as the eleventh biggest Christian song in 2022. "Relate" received two GMA Dove Award nominations for Pop/Contemporary Recorded Song of the Year and Short Form Video of the Year (Concept) at the 2022 GMA Dove Awards, ultimately winning the Short Form Video of the Year (Concept) award.

== Background ==
On 2 August 2021, For King & Country announced that they would release "Relate" on 6 August 2021, along with the song's music video premiering on Apple Music. The duo also announced that they were slated to perform the song live on the nationally syndicated morning talk show Fox & Friends.

On 28 January 2022, For King & Country and R3hab released a remix of the song.

== Composition ==
"Relate" is composed in the key of B Flat Major with a tempo of 70 beats per minute and a musical time signature of 4/4.

== Reception ==
=== Critical response ===
Jonathan Andre of 365 Days of Inspiring Media gave a positive review of "Relate", saying, "Standing at a bit under 3 minutes, both Joel and Luke deliver another compelling song about unity and seeing things from someone else's perspective." Andre opined that the song is "a firm sequel" to "Bleed the Same" by Mandisa.

=== Accolades ===
Awards
Year	Organization	Award	Result	Ref
2022	GMA Dove Awards	Pop/Contemporary Recorded Song of the Year	Nominated	
2022	GMA Dove Awards	Short Form Video of the Year (Concept)	Won	

Year-end lists
Publication	Accolade	Rank	Ref.
365 Days of Inspiring Media	Top 50 Songs of 2021	4	

== Commercial performance ==
"Relate" debuted at No. 46 on the US Christian Airplay chart dated 14 August 2021. "Relate" reached No. 1 on the Christian Airplay chart dated 11 December 2021.

"Relate" debuted at No. 15 on the US Hot Christian Songs chart dated August 21, 2021, concurrently charting at No. 4 on the Christian Digital Song Sales chart. The song reached No. 1 on the Hot Christian Songs chart dated February 12, 2022, following a surge in streams and digital downloads and thus becoming the duo's first No. 1 hit single on the chart.

== Music videos ==
The music video of "Relate" premiered on Apple Music on 6 August 2021, and was later published on For King & Country's YouTube channel on 7 August 2021. The live performance video of "Relate" was released via YouTube on 6 August 2021. The official lyric video of the song was uploaded on YouTube on 10 August 2021.

== Performances ==
On 18 March 2022, a video of "Relate" being performed by For King & Country in the Mojave Desert, was aired on The Kelly Clarkson Show.

== Track listing ==
"Relate"
No.	Title	Length
1.	"Relate"	2:53

"Relate" — Apple Music bonus content
No.	Title	Length
2.	"Relate" (Music video)	3:17
Total length:		6:10

"Relate" (R3hab remix)
No.	Title	Length
1.	"Relate" (R3hab remix)	2:46

== Charts ==
=== Weekly charts ===
Weekly chart performance for "Relate"
Chart (2021–2022)	Peak position
US Bubbling Under Hot 100 (Billboard)	6
US Adult Contemporary (Billboard)	17
US Adult Pop Airplay (Billboard)	32
US Hot Christian Songs (Billboard)	1
US Christian Airplay (Billboard)	1
US Christian AC (Billboard)	1
US Digital Song Sales (Billboard)	28

=== Year-end charts ===
2021 year-end chart performance for "Relate"
Chart (2021)	Position
US Christian Songs (Billboard)	65
US Christian Airplay (Billboard)	40
US Christian AC (Billboard)	41

2022 year-end chart performance for "Relate"
Chart (2022)	Position
US Adult Contemporary (Billboard)	48
US Christian Songs (Billboard)	11
US Christian Airplay (Billboard)	18
US Christian AC (Billboard)	26

== Release history ==
Release dates and formats for "Relate"
Region	Date	Version	Format	Label	Ref.
Various	6 August 2021	Album	Digital download; streaming	Word Entertainment	
United States	3 September 2021	Album	Christian radio	Word Entertainment	
Various	28 January 2022	R3hab remix	Digital download; streaming	Word Entertainment	
