= For God Is with Us =

2021 song by For King & Country

Single by For King & Country

from the album What Are We Waiting For?
- Released: 24 September 2021
- Genre: CCM; pop rock
- Length: 3:16
- Label: Word Entertainment
- Songwriter(s): Joel Smallbone; Jordan Reynolds; Josh Kerr; Luke Smallbone
- Producer(s): Josh Kerr; Tedd T.; Benjamin Backus; For King & Country

For King & Country singles chronology
"Relate" (2021)	"For God Is with Us" (2021)	"Kingdom Come" (2021)

Version with Hillary Scott
- Version with Hillary Scott

Hillary Scott singles chronology
"You Can Rest" (2022)	"For God Is with Us" (2022)

Music videos
- "For God Is with Us" on YouTube
- "For God Is with Us" (Lyrics) on YouTube

"For God Is with Us" is a song performed by an Australian Christian pop duo For King & Country. The song was released as the second single from their fifth studio album, What Are We Waiting For? (2022), on 24 September 2021. The song was written by Joel Smallbone, Jordan Reynolds, Josh Kerr, and Luke Smallbone.

"For God Is with Us" peaked at No. 1 on the US Hot Christian Songs chart. The song was ranked by Billboard as the fifth biggest Christian song in 2022. "For God Is with Us" was nominated for the GMA Dove Award for Short Form Video of the Year (Performance) at the 2022 GMA Dove Awards. The version of the song with Hillary Scott received a nomination for the Grammy Award for Best Contemporary Christian Music Performance/Song at the 2023 Grammy Awards.

== Background ==
On September 21, 2021, For King & Country announced that they would be releasing "For God Is with Us" as a single on September 24, 2021. "For God Is with Us" is a follow-up to the duo's single "Relate" which was released in August 2021. Joel Smallbone shared the story behind the song, saying:

We started writing this song from the perspective of a baby boy, and then into adulthood and the great sacrifice of Jesus and then how it impacted humanity. And somewhere along the way, we looked back and Luke and I called one another and said, 'Hey, maybe this is not just devoted to Christmas. Maybe this is a thought, an idea, that could carry with us through the whole year - through Christmas, and Easter, and beyond. Maybe this is a good reminder after so much loss, and so many questions about where God is in the midst of a pandemic, and where God is in the midst of racism or political division. It's kind of an offering and a celebration of the fact that we still believe that both religion and science points to this reality and it's continually pointing back to this reality that there is a creator, that there is creative design, and that it's not just an abstract thought, but God is actually amongst us and with us and that this earth has been endowed with life and beauty that comes from God.' We hope that it meets you where you are right now, into Christmas, and beyond.

== Composition ==
"For God Is with Us" is composed in the key of G with a tempo of 75 beats per minute and a musical time signature of 4/4.

== Reception ==
=== Critical response ===
Jonathan Andre of 365 Days of Inspiring Media gave a positive review of "For God Is with Us", saying, "For King & Country's new song is as joyous as it is poignant, as orchestral as it is resounding and compelling. Joel and Luke have crafted together a song that deeply proclaims so earnestly and fiercely that our God is with us, in the moments of yesteryear when He was born God incarnate as Jesus all those years ago, and is also with us now, even during moments when we may not 'see' or 'feel' Him also."

=== Accolades ===
Awards
Year	Organization	Award	Result	Ref
2022	GMA Dove Awards	Short Form Video of the Year (Performance)	Nominated	
2023	Grammy Awards	Best Contemporary Christian Music Performance/Song	Nominated	

Year-end lists
Publication	Accolade	Rank	Ref.
365 Days Of Inspiring Media	Top 50 Music Videos of 2021	5	
Louder Than The Music	LTTM Single Awards 2021	10	

== Commercial performance ==
"For God Is With Us" debuted at number 43 on the US Hot Christian Songs chart dated 9 October 2021, concurrently charting at No. 3 on the Christian Digital Song Sales chart.

== Music videos ==
The official music video of "For God Is with Us" was published on For King & Country's YouTube channel on 24 September 2021. The video shows the duo appearing in "an array of locations, from valleys to cityscapes, driving home that God is with us no matter the time or place." The official lyric video of the song was uploaded on YouTube on 29 November 2021.

== Track listing ==
"For God Is with Us"
No.	Title	Writer(s)	Length
1.	"For God Is with Us"	Joel Smallbone; Jordan Reynolds; Josh Kerr; Luke Smallbone	3:15

"For God Is with Us" with Hillary Scott
No.	Title	Length
1.	"For God Is with Us" (with Hillary Scott)	3:19

== Charts ==
=== Weekly charts ===
Weekly chart performance for "For God Is with Us"
Chart (2021–2022)	Peak position
New Zealand Hot Singles (RMNZ)	23
US Christian Songs (Billboard)	1
US Christian Airplay (Billboard)	1
US Christian AC (Billboard)	1

=== Year-end charts ===
Year-end chart performance for "For God Is with Us"
Chart (2022)	Position
US Christian Songs (Billboard)	5
US Christian Airplay (Billboard)	2
US Christian AC (Billboard)	3

== Release history ==
Release dates and formats for "For God Is with Us"
Region	Date	Version	Format	Label	Ref.
Various	24 September 2021	Album	Digital download; streaming	Word Entertainment	
United States	18 February 2022	Album	Christian radio	Word Entertainment	
Various	15 July 2022	Version with Hillary Scott	Digital download; streaming	Word Entertainment	
