= For King & Country (band) =

Australian-American pop duo

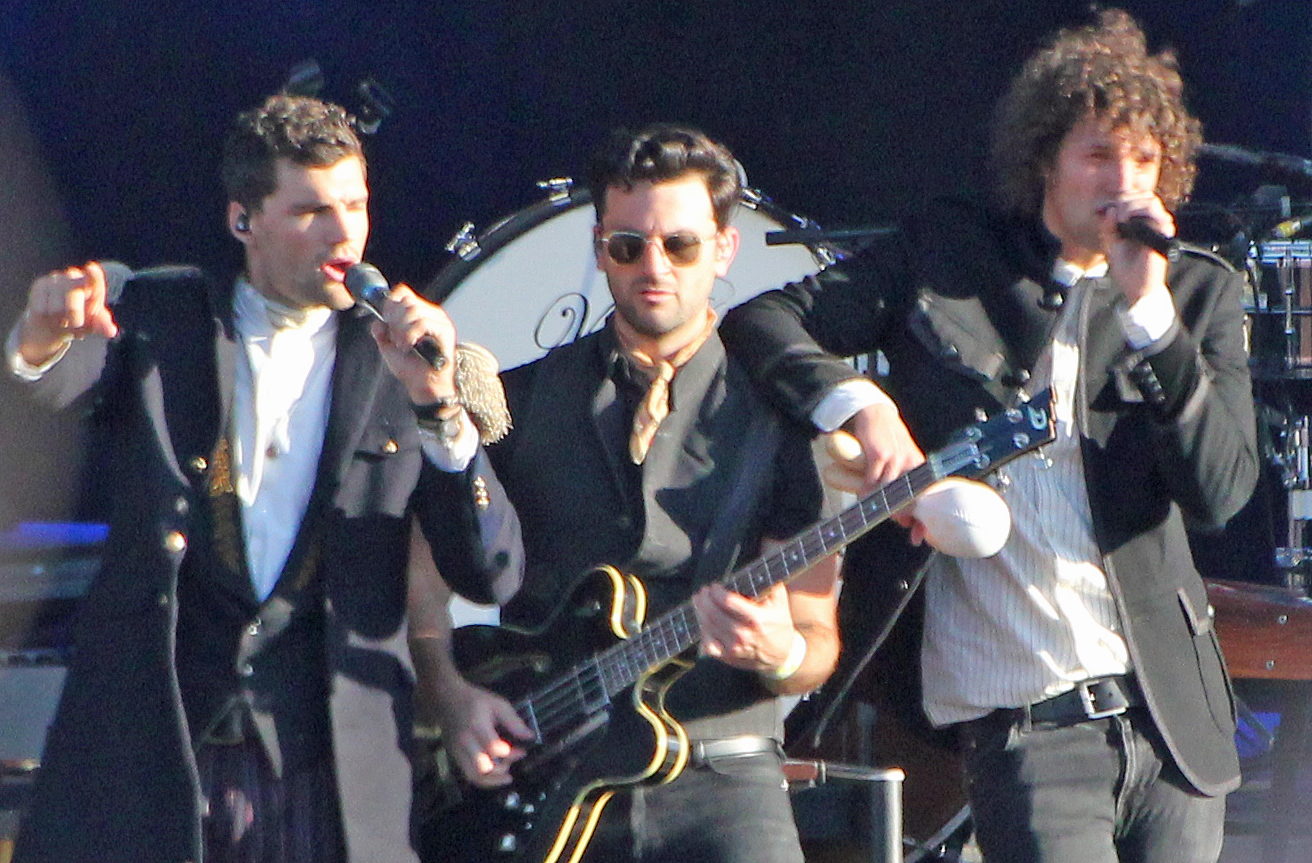
- For King & Country performing in 2018

Background information
- Origin: Australia
- Genres: Christian pop; Christian country music; alternative rock; soft rock
- Years active: 2007–present
- Label: Fervent/Curb
- Members: Joel Smallbone; Luke Smallbone
- Website: forkingandcountry.com

For King & Country, formerly known as Joel & Luke as well as Austoville, is a Christian pop duo composed of brothers Joel (born 5 June 1984) and Luke Smallbone (born 22 October 1986). The brothers were born in Australia and immigrated to the United States as children, settling in the Nashville area.

After releasing a short EP as Joel and Luke, they released their debut record Crave in 2012. The band was declared by Billboard as one of the "New Artists to Watch" for 2012. American Songwriter described them as "Australia's answer to Coldplay". In 2014, they released their second studio album, Run Wild. Live Free. Love Strong., which won a Grammy award.

In 2018, they released Burn the Ships, which achieved RIAA gold status. The album featured three singles, including "God Only Knows", which achieved platinum status, and "Joy" and "Burn the Ships", which reached gold status. In 2020, they released a full-length Christmas album, A Drummer Boy Christmas. In 2022, they released their fifth studio album, What Are We Waiting For?

The band has demonstrated considerable mainstream media appeal, with over 2 billion streams of their music as of 2024, and appearances at secular concert events such as the CMA Country Christmas and the Houston Rodeo. They have collaborated with other artists on their work, including Dolly Parton, Timbaland, Tori Kelly, Lecrae, CeCe Winans and Needtobreathe.

In addition to their music, the band has been at the center of several films, including Priceless, Unsung Hero, and a recent documentary, No Turning Back, which share titles and themes with three of their songs, as well as the musical film Journey to Bethlehem. A film they produced called Drummer Boy, is planned for release in November 2026.

== History ==
=== Early music career (2007–2008) ===
The brothers supplied background vocals and other supporting roles for their sister Rebecca St. James, family members, and various bands in concerts across America. Shortly after Luke graduated from high school, the brothers decided to explore the possibility of forming a band, and in 2007, they began performing as their band. They began their career as "Joel & Luke", which they later changed to "Austoville", before settling on their current name.

In 2008, "Joel & Luke" released a six-song EP titled A Tale of Two Towns. Three of those songs ("Missing", "Sane", and "Love's to Blame") appeared on Crave with slightly different melodies and lyrics. The other three songs were "Broken Lullabies", "Believe Me Now", "She Believes in Me" and "Something's Gotta Give". Love's to Blame was co-written by St. James. "She Believes In Me" originally released in 2008 was re-recorded, re-produced, and re-mixed for the band's 2024 album "Unsung Hero (The Inspired By Soundtrack)".

=== Rename to "for King & Country" and Crave (2009–2013) ===
In 2009, they signed on with Warner Music Group with Ben Glover as their producer. They changed their name to "For King & Country", after a British battle cry. Luke said,

"We wanted a band name that carried more meaning. We were in the studio recording our debut record that Joel had the idea of All The King's Men, like the Humpty Dumpty nursery rhyme. Our producer overheard our conversation and swung around in his chair and said, 'What about For King & Country?' And we all felt a sense of providence at that moment. "For King and Country" was the battle cry of English soldiers willing to lay down their lives for their king and their country. And now it has become our mission, to lay down our lives for our King and our country."

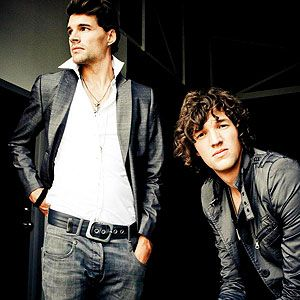
Joel and Luke in 2011.

In 2011, they released For King & Country: The EP. Their song "Busted Heart (Hold On to Me)" was released as a single and peaked at No. 3 on Billboard's Christian Songs chart. They described "Busted Heart" as "really a universal cry of humanity for something greater than ourselves...We think we've got it all sorted out, and life will deal you those blows." "Busted Heart" was the fastest-rising single of 2011 in their genre, climbing the Top 10 for weeks.

Their debut album Crave was released on 28 February 2012. The album hit No. 2 on the iTunes Top Christian & Gospel albums on its day of release and No. 42 on the overall chart. It peaked at No. 4 on Billboard's Christian Albums chart, and remained on the chart for 41 weeks. It also reached No. 128 on the Billboard 200 chart. The album has received positive reviews from critics. Shortly after Crave's release, they released "The Proof of Your Love" as a single, remixed and titled "The Proof of Your Love: The Monologue Mix". The single differs from the album version with a monologue spoken by Joel from 1 Corinthians 13:1–7 (The Message) as the bridge instead of the guitar riff on the album version. The single reached No. 8 on Billboard's Hot Christian Songs chart and spent 29 weeks on the chart. The band toured on the 2012 Winter Jam Tour Spectacular. In May 2012, they appeared on the Huckabee show on Fox News Channel.

Their debut hit song, "Busted Heart (Hold On to Me)" was featured on 28 October 2012 episode of VH1's Rehab with Dr. Drew. Among other television placements, their songs "People Change" and "Love's To Blame" have been featured on The CW's Vampire Diaries, and "Light It Up" and "Sane" have been featured on the Lifetime show Drop Dead Diva. In July 2012, they announced The Proof of Your Love Tour with Jason Castro and Dara Maclean to visit 30 cities from September through November 2012. In October 2012, they released an original Christmas song: "Baby Boy"; it reached No. 20 on the Hot Christian Songs chart. During the summer of 2013, the band was forced to take time off when the 6 ft 4 in (1.93 m) Luke dropped to 125 pounds (57 kg) due to an attack of ulcerative colitis. In June 2013, Joel Smallbone appeared in a non-singing role as King Xerxes in the film, The Book of Esther from Pure Flix Entertainment.

In August 2013, the band released Hope Is What We Crave: Live, a live album and DVD, both recorded at The Factory in Nashville on the last night of the band's first headlining tour. They also released "Hope Is What We Crave" as a single. It is a reworked version of "Crave" from their album. They toured with Casting Crowns starting in February 2014.

=== Rise in popularity (2014–2017) ===
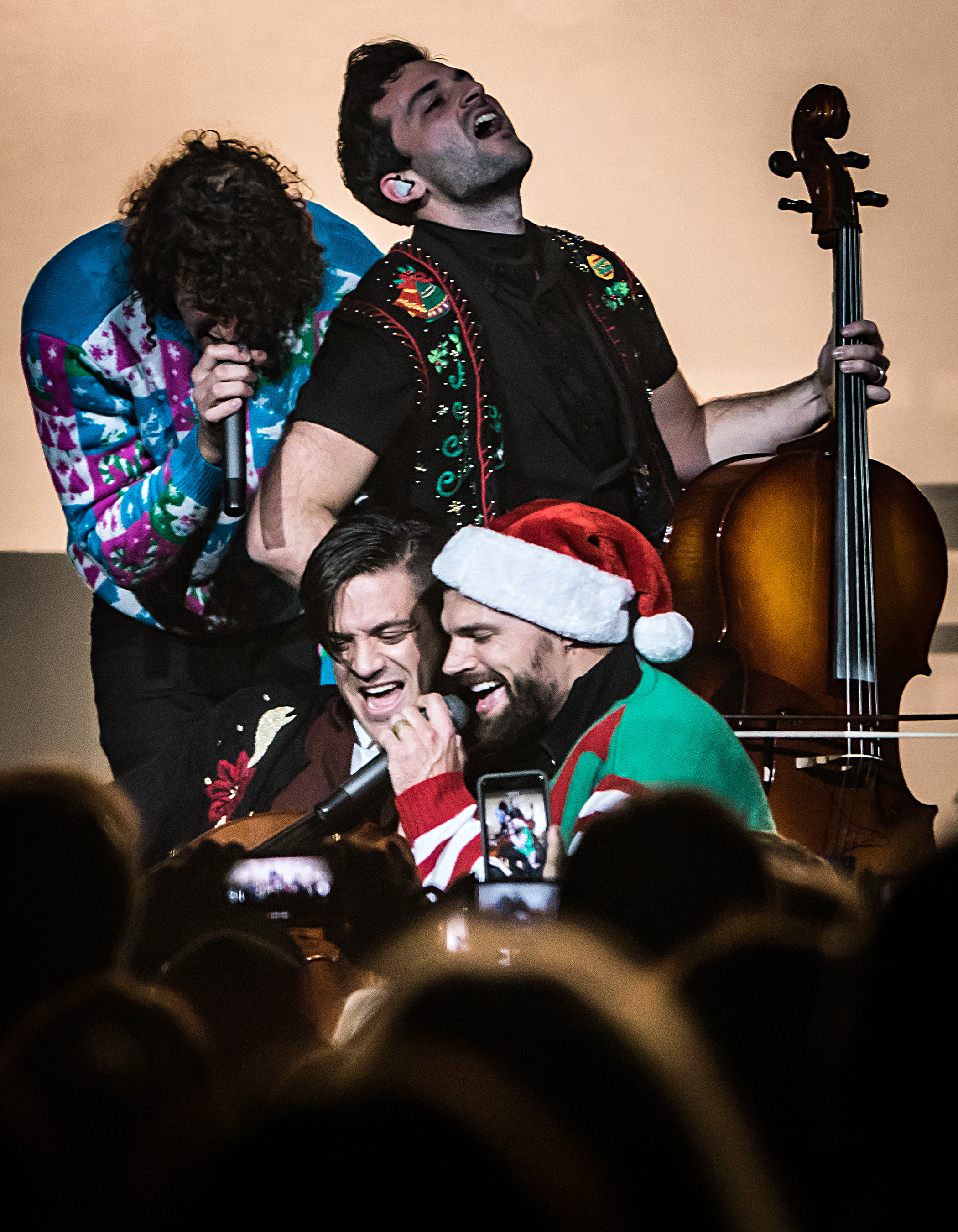
Joel & Luke alongside band members Vincent Dicarlo and Benjamin Backus in 2016.

For King and Country released a new album Run Wild. Live Free. Love Strong. on 16 September 2014. The album spent 17 weeks on the Billboard 200, peaking at No. 13, and reached No. 12 on the Digital Albums Chart. The band performed their songs "Run Wild" and "Fix My Eyes" on Jimmy Kimmel Live! on 25 March 2015. They were part of the Winter Jam Tour 2015 in the central and eastern parts of the United States and part of Winter Jam 2016. The duo released a deluxe anniversary edition of the album on 23 October 2015, including three new songs: "Priceless", "Ceasefire" and "Wholehearted", as well as a reworked version of "It's Not Over Yet", called "The Encore".

In 2016, Curb Records acquired Warner Music Group's stake in the band's record label, Word Entertainment, thus becoming King & Country's record label.

After releasing their second album, the brothers focused much of their time on the feature film Priceless, which stars Joel in a story about human trafficking. They wrote several songs for the film, part of the reason it took four years to release their next studio album. They also wrote a song, accompanied by a music video, entitled "Ceasefire" for the 2016 adaptation of Ben-Hur; the song was used in the second official trailer for the film and released as part of the official soundtrack.

On 27 October 2017, they released Christmas: Live from Phoenix, and shortly thereafter embarked on "A Glorious Christmas" tour with Casting Crowns.

=== Continued success (2018–2020) ===
The band announced that they had begun writing their third studio album, in January 2017. The album's lead single, "Joy", was released on 18 May 2018. It reached No. 35 on Billboard's Adult Top 40 chart and No. 2 on the Hot Christian Songs chart. Burn the Ships was released on 5 October 2018. The brothers described it as the "most mature record that we've made just in understanding who we are as a duo, who we are as men and maybe understanding life because we are a bit older than we were last time around." Two of the songs were written about the weighty topics of addiction and suicide, and two were written to and about their wives (who sing in the final track, "Pioneers", and appear in the accompanying music video). The album contains ten songs and they released five music videos to accompany them. "Joy" was nominated for the 2019 Grammy Award for Best Contemporary Christian Music Performance/Song.

In 2019, "God Only Knows" was released to radio becoming the second single from the album. The song had crossover success, reaching the Billboard Hot 100 and peaking at #17 on the Adult Contemporary chart. The band collaborated with Dolly Parton, who was featured on a new version of "God Only Knows". They also released new versions of the song featuring collaborations with Timbaland and Echosmith.

The Burn the Ships album won a Grammy in 2019, as did the single "God Only Knows".

In 2020, after cancelling its scheduled tour due to the coronavirus pandemic, the band performed drive-in style outdoor concerts where attendees listened and watched from their cars. The band announced they had reached over one billion digital streams of their songs.

In October 2020, the band released A Drummer Boy Christmas, a full-length Christmas album featuring collaborations with Needtobreathe and Gabby Barrett.

=== What Are We Waiting For? and Unsung Hero (2022–present) ===
In 2021, Burn the Ships achieved RIAA gold certification. The band also released a deluxe edition featuring remixes and collaborations with Parton, Timbaland, Echosmith, Tori Kelly, Lecrae, and Kirk Franklin. Also in 2021, the band released "Relate", a single from their forthcoming studio album What Are We Waiting For?, which was released in March 2022. "Relate" became the band's seventh straight number one hit on the Christian Airplay chart. On 24 September 2021, the band released a single titled "For God Is with Us", which would eventually also be on What Are We Waiting For?. The song peaked at 1 on the Christian Airplay chart, which became their eighth straight single to reach the mark. The band then embarked on a fall tour titled Relate | The Fall Tour | promoting these two singles.

In January 2022, the band released a promotional single titled "Unsung Hero", which is about their mom. The song peaked at 42 on the Hot Christian Songs chart. On the same date, pre-ordering for the new album started. On 18 February 2022, the band released their second promotional single from the album, titled "Love Me Like I Am". The song originally charted at 38 on the Hot Christian Songs chart.

In March 2022, they became the first Christian act to perform at RodeoHouston.

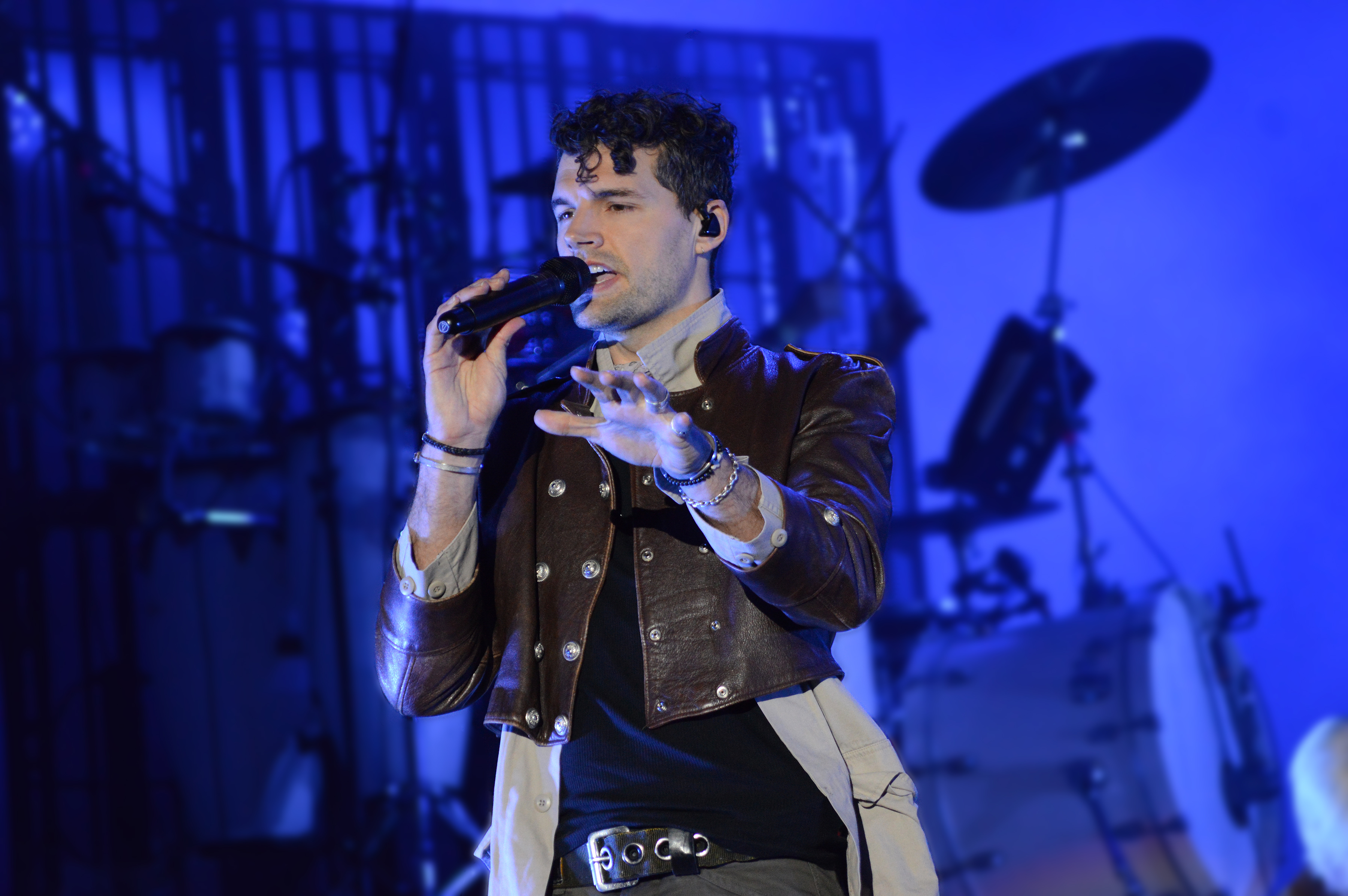
Joel performing at Rock the Universe in 2022.

The band's fifth studio album, What Are We Waiting For?, was released 11 March 2022. The album debuted at #1 on the Billboard Top Christian albums chart and #7 on the Billboard 200. One of the songs, "Broken Halos" peaked at 37 on the Hot Christian Songs chart, as a music video was released along with the song.

In October 2022, the band re-released their song "Love Me Like I Am" as a single featuring American singer and actress, Jordin Sparks who was the winner of season 6 of American Idol. In addition to featuring Sparks, the song included reworked instruments. The song peaked at No. 10 on the Hot Christian Songs chart.

In June 2023, the band released the single "What Are We Waiting For?", which had not previously been a track on an album. They later released a deluxe version of the album with 4 additional songs, including "What Are We Waiting For?", collaborations with Hillary Scott and Jordin Sparks on "For God Is with Us" and "Love Me Like I Am", respectively, and an unreleased track, titled "Better Man".

In February 2024, the band performed at RodeoHouston for a second time in their career, drawing a paid audience of 54,968, the largest in the band's history.

In April, they released their second movie, Unsung Hero. It went on to receive 21.1 million at the box office. The film went on to win a Dove Award for Inspirational Movie of the Year..

After the film was released, the band took a year off from touring. In October 2025, they released their first new song in over two years, "World on Fire". They announced a documentary about the band produced by The Wonder Project titled No Turning Back will be released on Amazon Prime Video in November 2025. In 2026, they have released one song titled Ever and Ever Before with their wives.

== Music and influences ==
In a 2012 interview, they described their philosophy:

"The power of music can impact our mood, emotions, our day. But when you merge the strength of music with the heart, hope and passion of the Gospel... it has the ultimate power not only to change someone's day, but to impact them for eternity. This is why we write music and sing songs – we hope that people will be moved, encouraged and stirred to live a life for Someone greater than themselves."

They cite U2, Mutemath, OneRepublic, the Beatles, Goo Goo Dolls, and Switchfoot, as well as film scores, such as those from Braveheart and Gladiator, as their musical influences. Also in an interview with Jesus Music, member Joel Smallbone discussed the 1980s metal band Stryper and their early influence on the band. The Smallbone brothers cited Stryper as a childhood influence, recalling "sitting in front of a record player holding a vinyl 45 of Stryper's The Yellow and Black Attack cover."

== Personal lives ==
Joel David Smallbone was born on 5 June 1984 and Luke James Smallbone was born on 22 October 1986. Both were born in Sydney, to David and Helen Smallbone, and moved to Nashville, Tennessee in 1991, after their father's job relocation. Their father was a music promoter, and Joel recalls, "going to these rock concerts, sitting on my father's shoulders, plugging my ears...Honestly, in a lot of ways, I feel like music chose me and as I grew older, I made a clear decision to fully lean into it." The Smallbones are the younger brothers of Christian recording artist and speaker Rebecca St. James, and the brothers-in-law of Jacob Fink, former bassist for the band Foster the People. They were raised with another sister, Libby, and three other brothers, Ben, Dan, and Josh.

On 26 June 2010, Luke married Courtney Helm. Their first child was born on 19 December 2012. They also have a son. In late 2016, Luke announced via social media that he and his wife are expecting their third child. From 2013 to 2015, Luke battled a life-threatening case of ulcerative colitis, pushing him near death and causing him to miss 40 of the band's live shows. He went into remission in 2015. He and his wife also nearly lost their two-month-old son in 2018; he has since made a full recovery after skull reconstruction surgery.

On 7 July 2013, Joel married Moriah Peters, who is also a recording artist, in California. They now reside in Franklin, Tennessee.

Both brothers are dual citizens of Australia and the United States.

== Band members ==
- Joel Smallbone – vocals, piano, keytar, harmonium, drums, percussion, sampler
- Luke Smallbone – vocals, drums, percussion, sampler

=== Additional musicians ===
- Gabe Baker – cello, guitars, sampler
- Vincent DiCarlo – bass, keyboards, trombone, sampler, guitars, cello
- Chris Karabelas – percussion
- Danny Lopez – keyboards, bass
- Kadin Tooley – content and creative director
- Hannah Sorrells Tyler – violin
- Garret Tyler – drums
- Daniel Waterbury – guitars, sampler

== Discography ==
- Crave (2012)
- Run Wild. Live Free. Love Strong. (2014)
- Burn the Ships (2018)
- A Drummer Boy Christmas (2020)
- What Are We Waiting For? (2022)
- The Most Beautiful Colours (2026)

== Other media ==
=== Film ===
In 2014, Joel Smallbone appeared in the movie Like A Country Song. Joel Smallbone was the lead actor in a 2016 drama about human trafficking entitled Priceless, which was released in theatres in October 2016. Luke was one of the producers (together with their father) and their brother Ben directed the movie. Some of the music for the film was written by For King & Country.

October 2015 saw the release of the bands music video cover of Taylor Swift’s song Out of the Woods.

In 2022, the brothers announced via social media that they had made a movie with their brother Ben, called Unsung Hero, about their upbringing and family's move from Australia to the United States. The film was released in theaters by Lionsgate in April 2024. The movie starred Joel Smallbone as his father David Smallbone, and Daisy Betts as Helen Smallbone. Each Smallbone sibling made a cameo in the film. The film was written, directed, produced, and starred Joel Smallbone. (Note: The film was also written and directed by Richard Ramsey, and also produced by Josh Walsh, Justin Tolley, and Luke Smallbone.), It grossed $21 million at the box office on a budget of $6 million. The band also released a soundtrack album alongside the film, titled Unsung Hero (The Inspired By Soundtrack), which features covers songs such as "Place in This World" by Michael W. Smith, "Lead Me On" by Amy Grant, and "Crazy" by Seal. The heavy metal band Stryper is featured as characters portrayed by actors. For the film's soundtrack, Joel and Luke Smallbone recorded a cover of "To Hell with the Devil" — retitled "To Hell With the Devil (RISE)" — featuring Lecrae and Stryper.

A concert film entitled A Drummer Boy Christmas, filmed at the Toyota Center in Houston, Texas, was released in theaters from 5–19 December 2024. The film grossed $2.9 million and is one of the top 30 highest-grossing concert movies of all time.

In 2019, it was announced that the brothers were working on a musical under the title The Drummer Boy with the Erwin brothers. The film is planned for release in 2026 and all music for it was written by the band. Joel reported that the film takes place during the American Revolutionary War about two brothers who end up on opposite sides of the battlefield. He described it as "a Christmas family film, so think Greatest Showman meets Pirates of the Caribbean meets Hamilton."

=== Novel ===
A novel, Priceless: She's Worth Fighting For, based on the film Priceless, was released on 6 September 2016.

== Awards and nominations ==
In December 2012, iTunes selected Crave as their Breakthrough Christian & Gospel Album of 2012 while at the inaugural K-LOVE Fan Awards held 1 June 2013, they collected the "Breakthrough Artist of the Year". In 2015, they won two Grammy Awards at the 57th Grammy Awards, one for Best Contemporary Christian Music Album and one for Best Contemporary Christian Music Performance/Song.

=== Billboard Music Awards ===
Year	Nominee / work	Award	Result
2019	For King & Country	Top Christian Artist	Nominated
2019	Burn the Ships	Top Christian Album	Nominated
2019	"Joy"	Top Christian Song	Nominated
2020	For King & Country	Top Christian Artist	Nominated
2020	"God Only Knows"	Top Christian Song	Won
2021	For King & Country	Top Christian Artist	Nominated
2021	"Together" (with Tori Kelly and Kirk Franklin)	Top Christian Song	Nominated
2022	For King & Country	Top Christian Artist	Nominated
2023	"Love Me Like I Am" (with Jordin Sparks)	Top Christian Song	Nominated
2023	For King & Country	Top Christian Artist	Nominated

=== Christian Media and Arts Australia ===
Year	Nominee / work	Category	Result	Ref.
2026	"World on Fire"	Australian Song of the Year	Pending	

=== Grammy Awards ===
Year	Nominee / work	Award	Result
2015	Run Wild. Live Free. Love Strong.	Best Contemporary Christian Music Album	Won
2015	"Messengers" (Lecrae featuring for King & Country)	Best Contemporary Christian Music Performance/Song	Won
2017	"Priceless"	Best Contemporary Christian Music Performance/Song	Nominated
2019	"Joy"	Best Contemporary Christian Music Performance/Song	Nominated
2020	"God Only Knows" (For King & Country and Dolly Parton)	Best Contemporary Christian Music Performance/Song	Won
2020	Burn the Ships	Best Contemporary Christian Music Album	Won
2023	"For God Is with Us" (For King & Country and Hillary Scott)	Best Contemporary Christian Music Performance/Song	Nominated
2024	"Love Me Like I Am" (For King & Country and Jordin Sparks)	Best Contemporary Christian Music Performance/Song	Nominated

=== GMA Dove Awards ===
Year	Nominee / work	Award	Result
2013	"The Proof of Your Love"	Song of the Year	Nominated
2013	"The Proof of Your Love"	Contemporary Christian Performance	Nominated
2013	Crave	Pop/Contemporary Album of the Year	Nominated
2013	"Caught Dreaming" (Andy Mineo featuring For King & Country)	Rap/Hip-Hop Song of the Year	Nominated
2013	For King & Country	New Artist of the Year	Won
2013	"The Proof of Your Love"	Short Form Music Video of the Year	Nominated
2015	For King & Country	Contemporary Christian Artist of the Year	Won
2015	Run Wild. Live Free. Love Strong.	Pop/Contemporary Album of the Year	Won
2016	For King & Country	Contemporary Christian Artist of the Year	Won
2019	"Joy"	Song of the Year	Nominated
2019	For King & Country (credited as Luke Smallbone and Joel Smallbone	Songwriter of the Year (Artist)	Nominated
2019	For King & Country	Artist of the Year	Nominated
2019	"God Only Knows"	Pop/Contemporary Recorded Song of the Year	Won
2019	Burn the Ships	Pop/Contemporary Album of the Year	Nominated
2020	"Burn the Ships"	Song of the Year	Nominated
2020	For King & Country	Contemporary Christian Artist of the Year	Nominated
2020	For King & Country	Artist of the Year	Won
2020	"Burn the Ships"	Pop/Contemporary Recorded Song of the Year	Nominated
2020	"Solo Dios Sabe (God Only Knows)" (featuring Miel San Marcos))	Spanish Language Recorded Song of the Year	Nominated
2020	"God Only Knows"	Short Form Video of the Year	Won
2021	"Together"	Song of the Year	Nominated
2021	For King & Country	Contemporary Christian Artist of the Year	Nominated
2021	For King & Country	Artist of the Year	Won
2021	"Together" (with Tori Kelly and Kirk Franklin)	Pop/Contemporary Recorded Song of the Year	Nominated
2021	A Drummer Boy Christmas	Christmas / Special Event Album of the Year	Won
2021	A Drummer Boy Christmas	Recorded Music Packaging of the Year	Nominated
2021	Burn The Ships Concert Film	Long Form Video of the Year	Won
2022	For King & Country	Artist of the Year	Nominated
2022	"Relate"	Pop/Contemporary Recorded Song of the Year	Nominated
2022	"Relate"	Short Form Music Video of the Year (Concept)	Won
2022	What Are We Waiting For?	Pop/Contemporary Album of the Year	Won
2022	"For God Is with Us"	Short Form Music Video of the Year (Performance)	Nominated
2022	What Are We Waiting For? | The Worldwide Special	Long Form Video of the Year	Won
2023	For King & Country	Artist of the Year	Nominated
2023	"Love Me Like I Am" (featuring Jordin Sparks)	Pop/Contemporary Recorded Song of the Year	Nominated
2023	Do You Hear What I Hear?	Short Form Music Video of the Year (Concept)	Nominated
2026	"Yes"	Rap/Hip Hop Recorded Song of the Year	Pending
2026	"World on Fire"	Short Form Music Video of the Year (Concept)"	Pending

=== We Love Awards ===
Year	Nominee / work	Category	Result	Ref.
2025	"World on Fire"	Song of the Year	Nominated	
2025	"World on Fire"	Pop Song of the Year	Nominated	
2025	"World on Fire"	Music Video of the Year	Nominated	
2025	"Yes" (with Steven Malcomb and KB)	Collaboration of the Year	Nominated	

== Tours ==
=== Headlining ===
- The Proof of Your Love Tour (2012) (featuring Dara Maclean and Jason Castro)
- You Matter | The Tour (2014–2015)
- Priceless: The Tour (2015–2016) (featuring KB and Jordan Feliz)
- A For King & Country Christmas (2016) (featuring Lauren Daigle)
- Burn the Ships World Tour (2018–2020)
- Little Drummer Boy | The Christmas Tour (2018) (featuring Cory Asbury and Zach Williams)
- Together Again (2020)
- A Drummer Boy Christmas Tour (2020–2025)
- Relate: The Fall Tour (2021)
- What Are We Waiting For Tour (2022–2023) (featuring Dante Bowe)
- Unsung Hero Promotional Tour (2024)
- The Homecoming Tour (2024)
- For King + Country Live: The Unsung Hero Tour (2024)
- The Most Beatuiful Colours Tour (2026)

=== Co-headlining ===
- Winter Jam 2016 (with Matthew West) (featuring Crowder, Lauren Daigle, Red, KB, Tedashii, Trip Lee, Sidewalk Prophets, and NewSong)
- A Glorious Christmas (2017) (with Casting Crowns)
- The Roadshow 2018 (with Matthew West, Natalie Grant, Bethel Music, Zach Williams, and Social Club Misfits)
- joy.UNLEASHED (2018) (with Skillet) (featuring LEDGER)

=== Supporting ===
- Winter Jam Fall Tour 2011 (Newsboys, Kutless, Matthew West, Red, Fireflight, KJ-52, NewSong, Dara Maclean, and Patrick Ryan Clark)
- Winter Jam 2012 (Skillet, Sanctus Real, Peter Furler, Kari Jobe, NewSong, Building 429, and Group 1 Crew)
- RESTART Tour (2013) (Newsboys) (supporting with Rapture Ruckus, Moriah Peters, and CAMPBELL)
- K-Love Christmas Tour (2013) (Big Daddy Weave) (supporting with Meredith Andrews)
- The Thrive Tour (2014) (Casting Crowns)
- Winter Jam 2015 (Skillet, Jeremy Camp, Francesca Battistelli, Building 429, NewSong, and Family Force 5)

=== Other live performances ===
In addition to performing on a number of concert tours over the years, the band usually spends the summers performing at summer festivals across the United States and Canada. The band is a regular performer at Lifest in Oshkosh, Wisconsin, Alive Festival in Mineral City, Ohio, and Unity Christian Music Festival in Muskegon, Michigan. The band has also performed at a number of non-Christian music festivals such as the Florida Strawberry Festival, Kentucky State Fair, L.A. County Fair, and Summerfest.
