= Seth Mosley =

American Christian musician and record producer (born 1987)

- Born: Seth David Mosley; October 17, 1987 (age 38); Circleville, Ohio
- Origin: Franklin, Tennessee
- Genres: CCM, Christian rock
- Occupations: Singer, songwriter, music producer
- Instruments: Vocals, guitar, keyboards
- Years active: 2006–present
- Labels: Centricity, Full Circle

Seth David Mosley (born October 17, 1987) is an American musician and record producer, who plays Christian pop and Christian rock. He was the frontman for the Christian alternative rock band Me in Motion. Mosley was awarded the Songwriter of the Year for a non-artist, at the 2015 GMA Dove Awards, where he was also honored as the Producer of the Year.

== Early and personal life ==
Mosley was born Seth David Mosley on October 17, 1987, in Circleville, Ohio, to parents James Arthur Mosley and Damaris Ruth Mosley (née, Flemming), He is the oldest of four children: Sarah, Josiah, and Rebecca. He graduated from Grove City Christian School in 2005 before embarking on his music endeavors. He married Swede Celi Ottosson on July 21, 2010, in a ceremony located at Kramfors, Sweden.

== Music career ==
His music recording career began in 2006 with the band Me in Motion. This would lead him to launch his own music production career, eventually starting up Full Circle Music in Franklin, Tennessee. He would achieve recognition for a Grammy Award during the 57th Annual Grammy Awards in the Best Contemporary Christian Music Album category, for his production of Run Wild. Live Free. Love Strong. by for King & Country. In 2015 he was honored by SESAC as the Christian Songwriter of the Year. Full Circle Music was honored with four GMA Dove Awards at the 46th annual ceremony in 2015, including Producer of the Year and Non-artist Songwriter of the Year for Mosley himself. Billboard magazine awarded him their Christian Producer of the Year Award.

== Full Circle Music ==
Full Circle Music is a group of music producers, engineers, songwriters, editors, studios and creators focused on delivering the highest quality music in a timely fashion, both to the label and to the independent artist.

They have a track record of success at radio with over 20 No. 1, Billboard chart sales, and TV or film placements, under the leadership of Grammy Award-winning, Sesac No. 1 writer of the year, and 2013 Billboard No. 1 producer of the year Seth Mosley.

They have topped radio charts, have performed on headlining tours, have been featured on NFL Network, Speed Network, VeggieTales, Target, MLB Network, and have been led in churches worldwide. In production, they work with a network of mixers, engineers, studios and equipment.
