= Joel Smallbone =

Australian singer (born 1984)

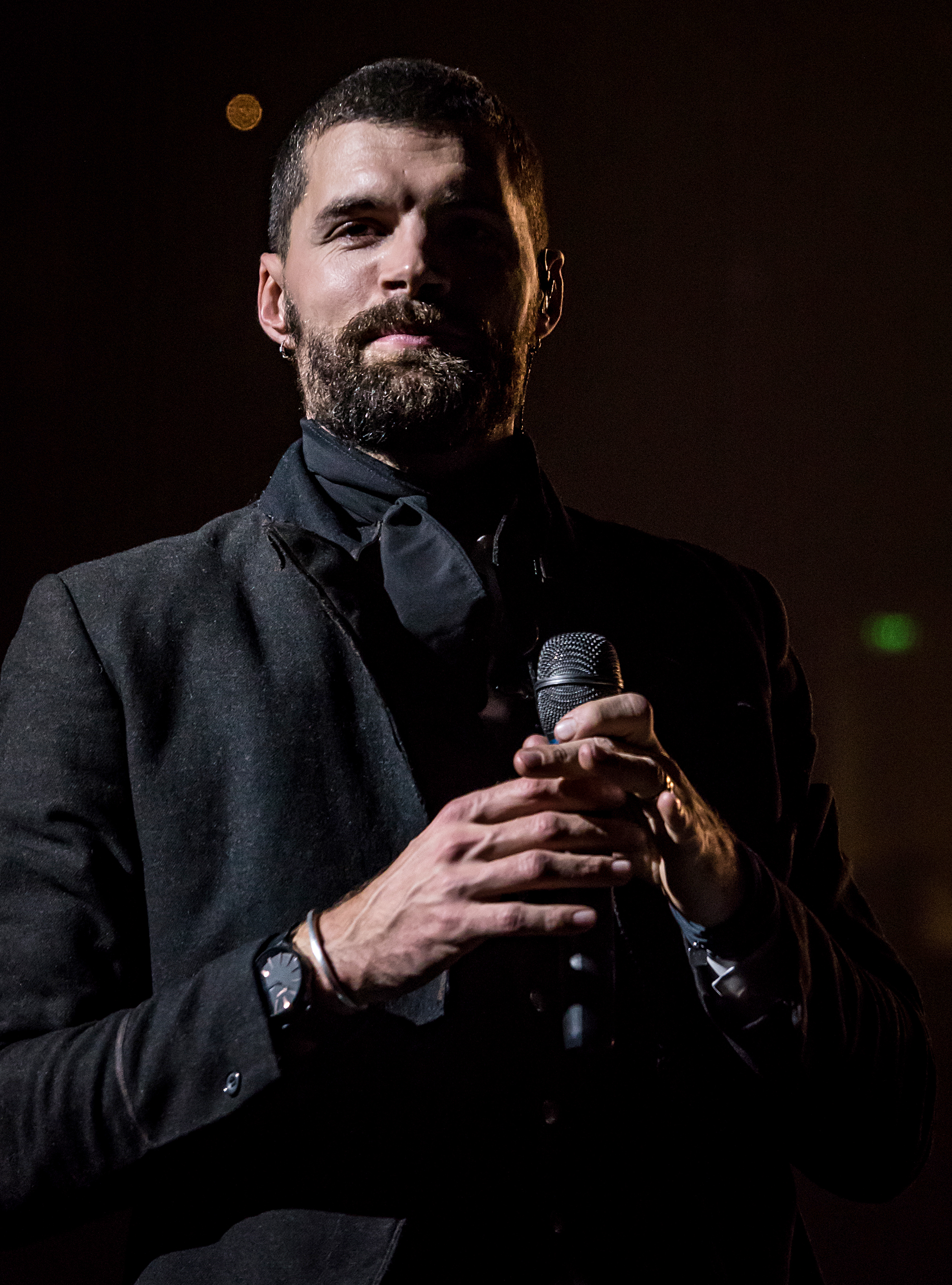
- Smallbone in 2016

Background information
- Born: Joel David Smallbone; 5 June 1984 (age 42); Sydney, Australia
- Genres: Christian pop; Christian country; alternative rock; soft rock
- Occupations: Singer; actor
- Member of: For King & Country
- Spouse: Moriah Peters (m. 2013)

Joel David Smallbone (born 5 June 1984) is an Australian-American singer and actor. He is a member of the Christian pop duo For King & Country along with his brother Luke. Smallbone played James Stevens in the 2016 film Priceless and Antipater in the 2023 film Journey to Bethlehem. He directed the 2024 Christian drama film Unsung Hero and played the role of his father David Smallbone.

== Early life ==
Smallbone was born in Wahroonga, Sydney, but moved to Nashville, Tennessee in 1991. He is the brother of Luke Smallbone and younger brother of Christian recording artist and speaker Rebecca St. James. Smallbone is also the brother-in-law of Jacob Fink, former bassist for the band Foster the People.

Smallbone's father was a music promoter, and Joel recalls, "going to these rock concerts, sitting on my father's shoulders, plugging my ears...Honestly, in a lot of ways I feel like music chose me and as I grew older, I made a clear decision to fully lean into it."

== Career ==
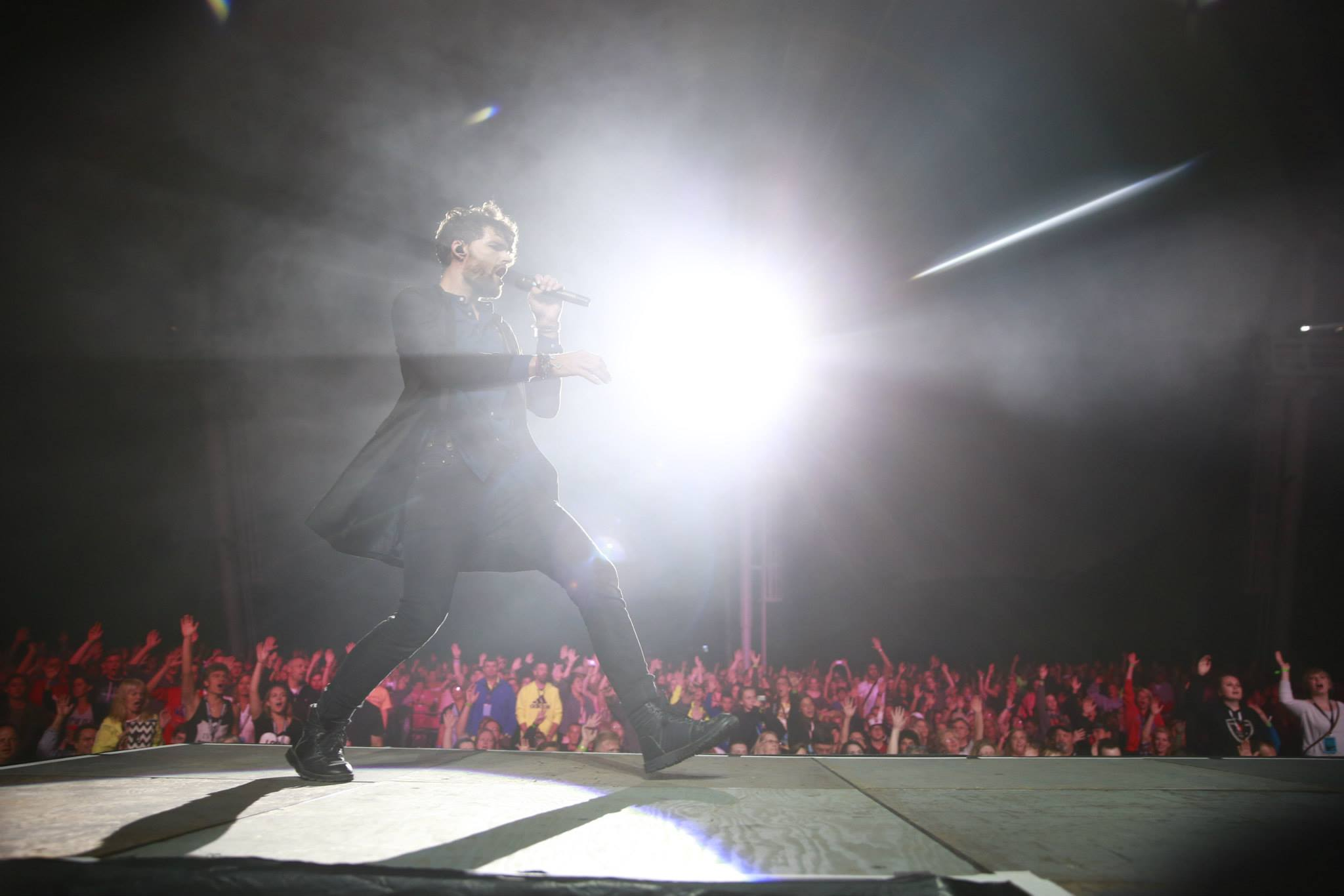
Smallbone with For King & Country performing at Kingdom Bound 2015

Smallbone provided backing vocals for his sister Rebecca in addition to light operation and stage management. He collaborated with his brother Luke and in 2008 they released their first EP, A Tale of Two Towns, initially performing under the name Austoville. The group was signed to Warner Bros. Records and later changed their name to For King & Country.

Smallbone began his acting career in 2013 by playing King Xerxes in The Book of Esther and as Jake Reeson in Like a Country Song. In 2016, Smallbone was cast in the leading role of James Stevens in the film Priceless. In December 2025, he was a guest narrator at Disney's Candlelight Processional at Walt Disney World.

Smallbone won two Grammy awards in 2014 and was nominated for another Grammy in 2016.

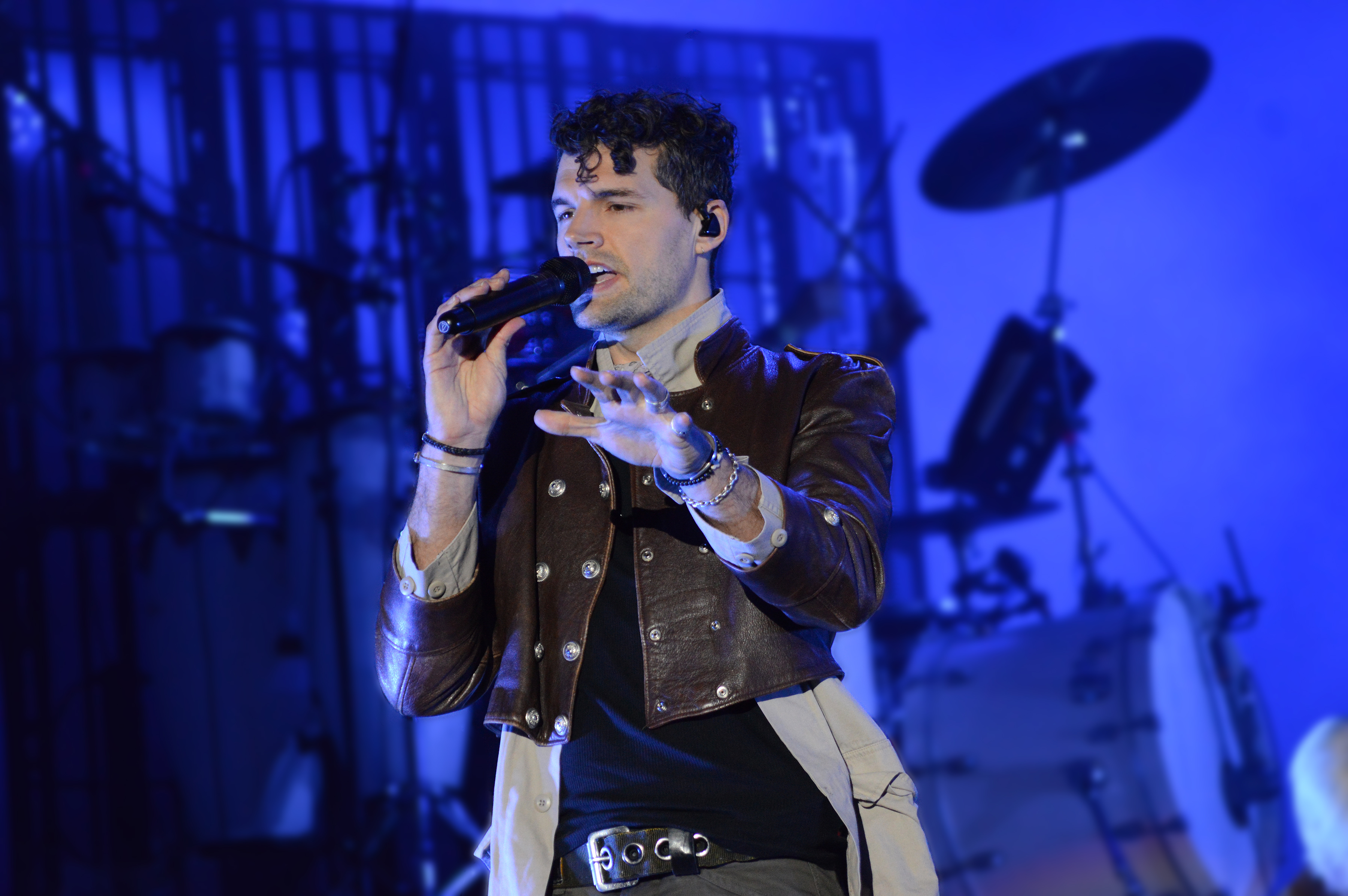
Smallbone performing at Rock the Universe in Orlando, Florida in 2022

== Personal life ==
Smallbone married Christian music artist and actress Moriah Peters (known professionally as MORIAH) in 2013.

Christian singer Rebecca St. James is the older sister to Smallbone and his brother Luke. Their father David is a concert promoter.

== Filmography ==
Year	Title	Role	Notes
2013	The Book of Esther	King Xerxes	
2014	Like a Country Song	Jake Reeson	
2016	Priceless	James Stevens	
2023	Journey to Bethlehem	Antipater	
2024	Unsung Hero	David Smallbone	Also director
2026	Young Washington	William Fairfax	
2026	Drummer Boy	Jeremiah Clem	Also director
