= Mark Schultz discography =

- Studio albums: 10
- Extended plays: 1
- Live albums: 2
- Compilation albums: 2
- Singles: 18
- Music videos: 5

The discography of Mark Schultz, an American Christian music performer, consists of nine studio albums, 18 singles, and five music videos.

Mark has had ten no.1 singles, won a Dove award for his album Live A Night of Stories and Songs in 2006 and been nominated 14 other times, gone off to be a platinum artist, and sold over 2 million records worldwide.

== Albums ==
=== Studio albums ===
Year	Album Details	Peak chart positions				
Year	Album Details	US	US Christ	US Heat	US Catalog	Sales
2000	Mark Schultz: Released: March 28, 2000; Label: Word; Format: CD	180	8	6	—	
2001	Song Cinema: Released: October 17, 2001; Label: Word; Format: CD, digital download	—	15	11	—	
2003	Stories & Songs: Released: October 14, 2003; Label: Word; Format: CD, digital download	—	12	28	—	
2006	Broken & Beautiful: Released: September 26, 2006; Label: Word; Format: CD, digital download	79	4	—	3	US: 300,000
2009	Come Alive: Released: August 25, 2009; Label: Word; Format: CD, digital download	62	3	—	—	
2011	Renaissance: Released: November 1, 2011; Label: Lucid Records; Format: CD, digital download	—	9	—	—	
2012	All Things Possible: Released: September 4, 2012; Label: FairTrade Services; Format: CD, digital download	—	20	—	—	
2014	Hymns: Released: March 25, 2014; Label: Lucid Artist; Format: CD, digital download	—	—	—	—	
2018	Christmas: Released: October 26, 2018; Label: Girona Records; Format: CD, digital download	—	—	—	—	
2026	Hymns From Home: Released: June 26, 2026; Label: Girona Records; Format: CD, digital download	—	—	—	—	
"—" denotes the album didn't chart.

=== Live albums ===
Year	Album Details	Peak chart positions				
Year	Album Details	US	US Christ	US Heat	US Catalog	Certifications
2005	Mark Schultz Live: A Night of Stories and Songs: Released: September 27, 2005; Label: Word; Format: CD/DVD, digital download	6	12	11	—	RIAA: Platinum
2018	Follow: Released: August 17, 2018; Label: Girona Records; Format: CD, digital download	25	—	—	—	

=== Compilations ===
Year	Album	Peak chart positions	Certifications (sales threshold)
Year	Album	US Christ	Certifications (sales threshold)
2007	Broken & Beautiful: Expanded Edition: Released: September 25, 2007; Label: Word; Format: CD/DVD, digital download	—	
2011	The Best of Mark Schultz: Released: April 19, 2011; Label: Word, Curb; Format: CD, digital download	22	

=== Extended plays ===
Year	Album Details	Peak chart positions					Certifications (sales threshold)
Year	Album Details	US	US Christ	US Heat	US Internet	US Catalog	Certifications (sales threshold)
2015	Before You Call Me Home: Released: October 30, 2015; Label: Fair Trade / Columbia; Format: CD, digital download	—	—	—	—	—	
"—" denotes the album didn't chart.

== Singles ==
Year	Single	Peak positions						Album
Year	Single	US AC	US Christ	US Christ AC	AFR	Year End Christ	Decade End Christ	Album
2000	"He's My Son"	22	8	1	—	13	—	Mark Schultz
2001	"I Am the Way"	—	1	1	—	2	—	Mark Schultz
2001	"Back in His Arms Again"	—	1	1	—	3	—	Song Cinema
2001	"I Have Been There"	—	5	1	—	12	—	Song Cinema
2003	"Letters From War"	—	6	5	1	15	—	Stories & Songs
2004	"You Are a Child of Mine"	—	1	1	—	4	—	Stories & Songs
2004	"He Will Carry Me"	—	9	4	—	8	—	Stories & Songs
2006	"I Am"	—	3	1	—	4	33	Live: A Night of Stories & Songs
2006	"Broken & Beautiful"	—	6	—	6	4	—	Broken & Beautiful
2006	"Everything to Me"	—	—	—	—	—	—	Broken & Beautiful
2007	"Walking Her Home"	—	5	—	—	—	—	Broken & Beautiful
2009	"He Is"	—	9	—	—	31	—	Come Alive
2010	"Love Has Come"	—	11	—	—	—	—	Come Alive
2010	"When Love Was Born"	—	16	—	—	—	—	Non-album single
2012	"All Things Possible"	—	10	5	—	—	—	All Things Possible
2013	"I Gave Up"	—	50	—	—	—	—	All Things Possible
2014	"Different Kind of Christmas"	—	31	—	—	—	—	Non-album single
2018	"Follow"	—	—	—	—	—	—	Follow
2023	"Girl on a Swing"	—	—	—	—	—	—	TBA
2023	"Lullabye (Goodnight, My Angel)"	—	—	—	—	—	—	TBA
2023	"Jesus Paid It All"	—	—	—	—	—	—	TBA
"—" denotes the album didn't chart.

=== Promotional singles ===
Year	Single	Album
2006	"1,000 Miles"	Broken & Beautiful
2009	"Live Like You're Loved"	Come Alive
"—" denotes the album didn't chart.

== Other appearances ==
Year	Song	Album
2003	"Shout to the Lord"	WOW Worship: Yellow
2004	"Give Us Clean Hands"	WOW Worship: Red
2005	"The First Noel"	WOW Christmas: Green

== Music videos ==
Year	Video	Album	Director(s)
2001	"I Have Been There"	Song Cinema	n/a
2003	"Letters From War"	Stories & Songs	Marc Dobiecki
2006	"Everything to Me"	Broken & Beautiful	Marc Dobiecki
2010	"Love Has Come"	Come Alive	Brown Bannister
2012	"All Things Possible"	All Things Possible	n/a
