= The Best of Mark Schultz =

Greatest hits album by Mark Schultz
- Released: April 19, 2011
- Recorded: 2001–2009
- Genres: CCM, pop
- Length: 77:03
- Labels: Word, Curb
- Producers: Brown Bannister; Mark Bright; Bernie Herms; Monroe Jones; Pete Kipley; Shaun Shankel

Mark Schultz chronology
Come Alive (2009)	The Best of Mark Schultz (2011)	Renaissance (2011)

The Best of Mark Schultz is a compilation album featuring Mark Schultz's greatest hits.

== Background ==
Schultz will promote the album during his Renaissance Tour with Jason Gray and David Klinkenberg. The tour will also promote his forthcoming instrumental album Renaissance. For now, the album will only be released during the tour and will have a later release date.

== Track listing ==
Album release
No.	Title	Writer(s)	Original album	Length
1.	"You Are a Child of Mine"	Chris Eaton, Mark Schultz	Stories & Songs	4:56
2.	"Broken & Beautiful"	Schultz, Matthew West	Broken & Beautiful	5:23
3.	"I Am"	Schultz	Mark Schultz Live: A Night of Stories & Songs	3:57
4.	"He's My Son"	Schultz	Mark Schultz	5:40
5.	"He Will Carry Me"	Sampson Brueher, Dennis Kurttila, Schultz	Stories & Songs	4:34
6.	"Letters from War"	Cindy Morgan, Schultz	Stories & Songs	4:17
7.	"I Have Been There"	Regie Hamm, Schultz	Song Cinema	4:08
8.	"Running Just to Catch Myself"	Schultz	Stories & Songs	5:29
9.	"When You Come Home"	Schultz	Mark Schultz	4:59
10.	"Back In His Arms Again"	Schultz	Song Cinema	4:26
11.	"What It Means to Be Loved"	Brown Bannister, Schultz	Come Alive	4:17
12.	"He Is"	Bannister, Schultz	Come Alive	4:01
13.	"Walking Her Home"	Schultz	Broken & Beautiful	4:14
14.	"When Love Was Born"	Bernie Herms, Stephanie Lewis, Schultz	When Love Was Born (Single)	3:16
15.	"I Am the Way"	Schultz	Mark Schultz	3:58
16.	"Love Has Come"	Bannister, Sam Mizell, Schultz, West	Come Alive	5:21
17.	"Remember Me"	Schultz	Mark Schultz	4:07
Total length:				77:03

== Charts ==
Chart	Peak Position
US Billboard Top Christian Albums	40
