= R3hab discography =

- Studio albums: 3
- Singles: 123
- Music videos: 28

The discography of Dutch DJ and record producer R3hab consists of three studio albums and 123 singles, including three as a featured artist.

== Albums ==
=== Studio albums ===
Title	Details	Peak chart positions
Title	Details	US Dance
Trouble	Released: 15 September 2017; Label: R3hab Music; Format: Digital download, streaming	9
The Wave	Released: 24 August 2018; Label: Cyb3rpvnk; Format: Digital download, streaming	10
Dream Inside a Dream	Released: 31 July 2026; Label: Cyb3rpvnk; Format: Digital download, streaming	TBA

== Singles ==
=== As lead artist ===
Title	Year	Peak chart positions										Certifications	Album
Title	Year	NLD	BEL	CAN	DEN	FRA	GER	NOR	SWE	UK	US Dance	Certifications	Album
"Mrkrstft" (with Hardwell)	2008	—	—	—	—	—	—	—	—	—	—		Non-album singles
"Blue Magic" (with Hardwell)	2009	—	—	—	—	—	—	—	—	—	—		Non-album singles
"Fastevil" (with Addy van der Zwan and Groeneveld)	2009	—	—	—	—	—	—	—	—	—	—		Non-album singles
"Rock This Place"	2009	—	—	—	—	—	—	—	—	—	—		Non-album singles
"Get Get Down" (with Addy van der Zwan)	2009	68	—	—	—	—	—	—	—	—	—		Non-album singles
"I Wanna"	2010	—	—	—	—	—	—	—	—	—	—		Non-album singles
"Pump the Party"	2010	—	—	—	—	—	—	—	—	—	—		Non-album singles
"Keep Up for Your Love" (with Ferruccio Salvo)	2010	—	—	—	—	—	—	—	—	—	—		Non-album singles
"The Bottle Song"	2011	—	—	—	—	—	—	—	—	—	—		Non-album singles
"Prutataaa" (with Afrojack)	2011	—	—	—	—	—	—	—	—	—	—		Non-album singles
"Sending My Love" (with Swanky Tunes featuring Max C)	2011	—	—	—	—	—	—	—	—	—	—		Non-album singles
"Living for the City" (with Shermanology)	2012	—	—	—	—	—	—	—	—	—	—		Non-album singles
"A Night In" (EDC Orlando 2012 Anthem)	2012	—	—	—	—	—	—	—	—	—	—		Non-album singles
"Skydrop" (with ZROQ)	2012	—	—	—	—	—	—	—	—	—	—		Non-album singles
"Do It" (Life in Color Anthem 2013) (with David Solano)	2013	—	—	—	—	—	—	—	—	—	—		Non-album singles
"Raise Those Hands" (with Bassjackers)	2013	—	—	—	—	—	—	—	—	—	—		Non-album singles
"Revolution" (with Nervo and Ummet Ozcan)	2013	—	76	—	—	163	—	—	—	37	31		Non-album singles
"Flight" (with Steve Aoki)	2013	—	—	—	—	—	—	—	—	—	—		Non-album singles
"Rip It Up" (with Lucky Date)	2013	—	—	—	—	—	—	—	—	—	—		Non-album singles
"Samurai (Go Hard)"	2014	—	—	—	—	—	—	—	—	—	—		Non-album singles
"Flashlight" (with Deorro)	2014	—	104	—	—	—	—	—	—	—	47		Non-album singles
"Androids"	2014	—	—	—	—	—	—	—	—	—	—		Non-album singles
"Unstoppable" (featuring Eva Simons)	2014	—	—	—	—	—	—	—	—	—	—		Beats of the Beautiful Game
"How We Party" (with Vinai)	2014	—	—	—	—	—	—	—	—	—	32		Non-album singles
"Ready for the Weekend" (with Nervo featuring Ayah Marar)	2014	—	106	—	—	—	—	—	—	—	46		Non-album singles
"Soundwave" (with Trevor Guthrie)	2014	—	—	31	—	—	—	—	—	—	—		Non-album singles
"Karate" (with Kshmr)	2014	—	78	—	—	84	—	—	—	—	—		Non-album singles
"Phoenix" (with Sander van Doorn)	2015	—	—	—	—	—	—	—	—	—	—		Non-album singles
"Tiger" (vs. Skytech and Fafaq)	2015	—	—	—	—	—	—	—	—	—	—		Non-album singles
"Won't Stop Rocking" (with Headhunterz)	2015	—	—	—	—	—	—	—	—	—	—		Non-album singles
"Strong" (with Kshmr)	2015	—	78	—	—	—	—	—	—	—	—		Non-album singles
"Hakuna Matata" (Hardwell edit)	2015	—	—	—	—	—	—	—	—	—	—		Non-album singles
"Get Up" (with Ciara)	2016	—	—	—	—	—	—	—	—	—	—		Non-album singles
"Near Me" (with Burns)	2016	—	—	—	—	—	—	—	—	—	—		Non-album singles
"Freak" (with Quintino)	2016	63	83	—	—	—	—	—	— (Note: "Freak" did not enter the Swedish Singles Chart, but peaked at number five on the Swedish Heatseeker chart.)	—	—		Non-album singles
"Care" (with Felix Snow featuring Madi)	2016	—	—	—	—	—	—	—	—	—	36		Non-album singles
"Sakura"	2016	—	—	—	—	—	—	—	—	—	—		Non-album singles
"Wave" (with Amber and Luna)	2016	—	—	—	—	—	—	—	—	—	—		Non-album singles
"Icarus"	2016	—	—	—	—	—	—	—	—	—	23		Trouble
"Everything" (with Skytech)	2016	—	—	—	—	—	—	—	—	—	—		Non-album single
"Trouble" (featuring Vérité)	2017	—	—	—	—	—	—	—	—	—	26		Trouble
"Hallucinations" (featuring Ritual)	2017	—	—	—	—	—	—	—	—	—	—		Trouble
"Marrakech" (with Skytech)	2017	—	—	—	—	—	—	—	—	—	—		Trouble
"Truth or Dare" (featuring Little Daylight)	2017	—	—	—	—	—	—	—	—	—	48		Trouble
"Hold Me"	2017	—	—	—	—	—	—	—	—	—	—		Trouble
"Killing Time" (with Felix Cartal)	2017	—	—	—	—	—	—	—	—	—	—		Trouble
"You Could Be" (with Khrebto)	2017	—	—	—	—	—	—	—	—	—	35		Trouble
"I Just Can't" (with Quintino)	2017	—	—	—	—	—	—	—	—	—	22		Trouble
"Islands" (with Kshmr)	2017	—	—	—	—	—	—	—	—	—	—		Non-album single
"Ain't That Why" (with Krewella)	2017	—	—	—	—	—	—	—	—	—	23		The Wave
"Lullaby" (with Mike Williams)	2018	—	—	—	—	—	—	7	66	—	27	GLF: Gold; IFPI DEN: Gold; IFPI NOR: Platinum	The Wave
"The Wave" (with Lia Marie Johnson)	2018	—	—	—	—	—	—	—	—	—	33		The Wave
"Hyperspace" (with Skytech)	2018	—	—	—	—	—	—	—	—	—	—		Non-album single
"We Do" (with Noah Neiman featuring Miranda Glory)	2018	—	—	—	—	—	—	—	—	—	—		The Wave
"Hold on Tight" (with Conor Maynard)	2018	—	—	—	—	—	—	—	—	—	23		The Wave
"What You Do" (with Skytech)	2018	—	—	—	—	—	—	—	—	—	—		Non-album single
"How You've Been" (with Quinn Lewis)	2018	—	—	—	—	—	—	—	—	—	46		The Wave
"Let It Go" (with Skytech)	2018	—	—	—	—	—	—	—	—	—	—		Non-album singles
"Dana" (with Ali B and Cheb Rayan featuring Numidia)	2018	42	—	—	—	—	—	—	—	—	—		Non-album singles
"Wrong Move" (with THRDL!FE featuring Olivia Holt)	2018	—	—	—	—	—	—	—	—	—	—		The Wave
"Tell Me It's Ok" (with Waysons)	2018	—	—	—	—	—	—	—	—	—	—		The Wave
"Starflight" (with Skytech)	2018	—	—	—	—	—	—	—	—	—	—		Non-album single
"Radio Silence" (with Jocelyn Alice)	2018	—	—	—	—	—	—	—	—	—	—		The Wave
"Whiplash" (with Kaela Sinclair)	2018	—	—	—	—	—	—	—	—	—	—		The Wave
"Good Intentions" (with Fabian Mazur featuring Lourdiz)	2018	—	—	—	—	—	—	—	—	—	—		The Wave
"Rumors" (with Sofia Carson)	2018	—	—	—	—	—	—	—	—	—	—		The Wave
"Up All Night" (with MOTi featuring Fiora)	2018	—	—	—	—	—	—	—	—	—	—		Non-album single
"Take Me for a Ride" (with Waysons)	2018	—	—	—	—	—	—	—	—	—	—		Ikuzo
"Fuego" (with Skytech)	2018	—	—	—	—	—	—	—	—	—	—		Non-album singles
"All into Nothing" (with Mokita)	2018	—	—	—	—	—	—	—	—	—	—		Non-album singles
"Bad!"	2019	—	—	—	—	—	—	—	—	—	—		Non-album singles
"This Is How We Party" (with Icona Pop)	2019	—	—	—	—	—	—	—	—	—	—		Non-album singles
"All Around the World (La La La)" (with A Touch of Class)	2019	18	11	—	26	63	29	31	47	—	20	NVPI: Platinum; BPI: Gold; BRMA: Gold; BVMI: Platinum; GLF: 2× Platinum; IFPI DEN: Platinum; MC: 2× Platinum; RIAA: Gold; SNEP: Platinum	Non-album singles
"Don't Give Up on Me" (with Andy Grammer)	2019	—	—	—	—	—	—	—	—	—	—	GLF: Gold	Non-album singles
"Don't Give Up on Me Now" (with Julie Bergan)	2019	—	—	—	—	—	—	30	—	—	—		Non-album singles
"Alive" (with Vini Vici featuring Pangea and Dego)	2019	—	88	—	—	—	—	—	—	—	—		Non-album singles
"Exhale" (with Ella Vos)	2019	—	—	—	—	—	—	—	—	—	—		Non-album singles
"All Comes Back to You"	2019	—	—	—	—	—	—	—	—	—	—		Non-album singles
"Flames" (with Zayn and Jungleboi)	2019	—	62	—	—	124	—	—	— (Note: "Flames" did not enter the Swedish Singellista Chart, but peaked at number seven on the Swedish Heatseeker Chart.)	—	—		Non-album singles
"I Luv U" (with Sofia Carson)	2019	—	—	—	—	—	—	—	—	—	21		Non-album singles
"Let Me Down Slow" (with New Hope Club)	2020	—	—	—	—	—	—	—	—	—	—		New Hope Club
"More Than OK" (with Clara Mae and Frank Walker)	2020	—	56	—	—	—	—	—	— (Note: "More Than OK" did not enter the Swedish Singellista Chart, but peaked at number two on the Swedish Heatseeker Chart.)	—	22		Non-album singles
"Where You Wanna Be" (with Elena Temnikova)	2020	—	—	—	—	—	—	—	—	—	—		Non-album singles
"Creep" (with Gattüso)	2020	—	95	—	—	—	—	—	—	—	—		Non-album singles
"Good Example" (with Andy Grammer)	2020	—	—	—	—	—	—	—	—	—	23		Non-album singles
"911" (with Timmy Trumpet)	2020	—	—	—	—	—	—	—	—	—	—		Mad World
"Be Okay" (with Hrvy)	2020	—	—	—	—	—	—	—	—	—	—		Can Anybody Hear Me?
"Bésame (I Need You)" (with Tini and Reik)	2020	—	84	—	—	—	—	—	—	—	46		Non-album singles
"Miss U More Than U Know" (with Sofia Carson)	2020	—	—	—	—	—	—	—	—	—	32		Non-album singles
"I Can Feel Alive" (featuring Arizona)	2020	—	—	—	—	—	—	—	—	—	—		Non-album singles
"Thinking About You" (with Winona Oak)	2020	—	—	—	—	—	—	—	—	—	—		Non-album singles
"Party Girl"	2020	—	—	—	—	—	—	—	—	—	—		Non-album singles
"Smells Like Teen Spirit" (with Amba Shepherd)	2020	—	75	—	—	—	—	—	—	—	50		Non-album singles
"Love in the Morning" (with Thutmose and Rema)	2020	—	—	—	—	—	—	—	—	—	—		Non-album singles
"Love U Again" (with Olivia Holt)	2020	—	—	—	—	—	—	—	—	—	40		Non-album singles
"Family Values" (with Nina Nesbitt)	2020	—	—	—	—	—	—	—	—	—	—		Non-album singles
"Am I the Only One" (with Astrid S and HRVY)	2020	—	—	—	—	—	—	31	—	—	—		Non-album singles
"One Love" (with Now United)	2020	—	—	—	—	—	—	—	—	—	—		Non-album singles
"One More Dance" (with Alida)	2020	—	—	—	—	—	—	—	—	—	—		Non-album singles
"Dream of You" (with Chungha)	2020	—	—	—	—	—	—	—	—	—	—		Querencia
"Ones You Miss"	2020	—	—	—	—	—	—	—	—	—	30		Non-album single
"Santa Claus Is Coming to Town" (with Dimitri Vegas & Like Mike)	2020	—	69	—	—	—	—	—	—	—	—		Home Alone Christmas EP
"Candyman" (with Marnik)	2021	—	—	—	—	—	—	—	—	—	—		Non-album singles
"Fendi" (with Rakhim and Smokepurpp)	2021	—	—	—	—	—	—	—	—	—	—		Non-album singles
"Ringtone" (with Fafaq and Dnf)	2021	—	—	—	—	—	—	—	—	—	—		Non-album singles
"Distant Memory" (with Timmy Trumpet and W&W)	2021	—	—	—	—	—	—	—	—	—	44		Non-album singles
"Stars Align" (with Jolin Tsai)	2021	—	—	—	—	—	—	—	—	—	—		Non-album singles
"Sorry I Missed Your Call" (with Fafaq and Dnf)	2021	—	—	—	—	—	—	—	—	—	—		Non-album singles
"Close to You" (with Andy Grammer)	2021	—	—	—	—	—	—	—	—	—	22		Non-album singles
"Pues" (with Luis Fonsi and Sean Paul)	2021	—	—	—	—	—	—	—	—	—	—		Non-album singles
"Downtown" (with Kelvin Jones)	2021	—	—	—	—	—	—	—	—	—	—		Non-album singles
"The Portrait (Ooh La La)" (with Gabry Ponte)	2021	—	—	—	—	—	—	—	—	—	—		Non-album singles
"Runaway" (with Sigala and JP Cooper)	2021	—	—	—	—	—	—	—	— (Note: "Runaway" did not enter the Swedish Singellista Chart, but peaked at number 14 on the Swedish Heatseeker Chart.)	—	23		Non-album singles
"Sad Boy" (with Jonas Blue featuring Ava Max and Kylie Cantrall)	2021	—	—	—	—	—	—	—	— (Note: "Sad Boy" did not enter the Swedish Singellista Chart, but peaked at number three on the Swedish Heatseeker Chart.)	—	17		Non-album singles
"Most People" (with Lukas Graham)	2021	—	—	—	—	—	—	—	— (Note: "Most People" did not enter the Swedish Singellista Chart, but peaked at number six on the Swedish Heatseeker Chart.)	—	—		Non-album singles
"Call Me" (with Gabry Ponte and Timmy Trumpet)	2022	80	—	—	—	—	—	—	—	—	—		Non-album singles
"Shooting Darts" (with Dimitri Vegas & Like Mike and Prezioso)	2022	—	—	—	—	—	—	—	—	—	—		Non-album singles
"Love We Lost" (with Armin van Buuren featuring Simon Ward)	2022	—	—	66	—	—	—	—	—	—	33		Feel Again, Pt. 1
"Saved My Life (with Andy Grammer)	2022	—	—	—	—	—	—	—	—	—	—		The Art of Joy and Monster (Deluxe)
"Sway My Way" (with Amy Shark)	2022	—	—	—	—	—	—	—	—	—	50	ARIA: Platinum	TBA
"Worlds on Fire" (with Afrojack featuring Au/Ra)	2022	—	—	—	—	—	—	—	—	—	44		Non-album singles
"Mas Gasolina" (with Ryan Arnold and N.F.I.)	2022	—	—	—	—	—	—	—	—	—	—		Non-album singles
"I Ain't Got No Worries" (with Ofenbach)	2022	—	—	—	—	—	—	—	—	—	—		Non-album singles
"Poison" (with Timmy Trumpet and W&W)	2022	—	—	—	—	—	—	—	—	—	—		Non-album singles
"Shockwave" (with Afrojack)	2023	—	—	—	—	—	—	—	—	—	—		Non-album singles
"Run Till Dark" (with Now United)	2023	—	—	—	—	—	—	—	—	—	—		Non-album singles
"Waterfall" (with Michael Schulte)	2023	—	—	—	—	—	42	—	—	—	—		Non-album singles
"Dom Dom Yes Yes" (with Timmy Trumpet and Naeleck)	2023	—	—	—	—	—	—	—	—	—	—		Non-album singles
"Rock My Body" (with Inna and Sash!)	2023	21	29	—	—	32	—	—	79	—	—	SNEP: Platinum	Non-album singles
"Easy" (with KSI and Bugzy Malone)	2023	—	—	—	—	—	—	—	—	—	—		TBA
"Waray (with Issam Alnajjar featuring Manal)	2023	—	—	—	—	—	—	—	—	—	—		Waray
"Run Free (Countdown)" (with Tiësto)	2023	—	—	—	—	—	—	—	—	—	—		Non-album singles
"Loca Loca" (x Pelican)	2023	—	—	—	—	55	—	—	—	—	—		Non-album singles
"Better Me" (with Michael Schulte)	2023	—	—	—	—	—	— (Note: "Better Me" did not enter the German Singles Chart, but peaked at number 5 on the German Airplay Chart.)	—	—	—	—		Non-album singles
"Sleep Tonight (This Is the Life)" (with Switch Disco and Sam Feldt)	2024	—	—	—	—	—	—	—	—	—	—		Non-album singles
"Feel This Way" (with Victoria Nadine)	2024	—	—	—	—	—	—	32	—	—	—		Non-album singles
"Electricity" (with Fast Boy)	2024	—	—	—	—	—	—	—	—	—	—		Non-album singles
"Animal" (with Jason Derulo)	2024	—	—	—	—	—	—	—	—	—	30		Non-album singles
"Jet Plane" (with Vize and JP Cooper)	2024	—	—	—	—	—	—	—	—	—	—		Non-album singles
"Are You Happy Now" (with Curley G and Crazy Donkey)	2024	—	—	—	—	—	—	—	—	—	—		Non-album singles
"Believe (Shooting Stars)" (with Mufasa & Hypeman and Rani)	2024	26	—	—	—	—	—	—	—	—	—		Non-album singles
"Rebellion" (with Michael Patrick Kelly and Shaggy)	2025	—	—	—	—	—	—	—	—	—	—		Non-album singles
"Hypnotising"	2025	—	—	—	—	—	—	—	—	—	—		Non-album singles
"Drip Drip"	2025	—	—	—	—	—	—	—	—	—	—		Non-album singles
"Right Here, Right Now"	2025	—	—	—	—	—	—	—	—	—	—	—	Non-album singles
"The Chase"	2025	—	—	—	—	—	—	—	—	—	—	—	Non-album singles
"All My Life"	2025	—	—	—	—	—	—	—	—	—	—		Non-album singles
"Rise or Fall"	2025	—	—	—	—	—	—	—	—	—	—		Non-album singles
"Sunny" (with Boney M.)	2025	—	—	—	—	—	—	—	—	—	—		Non-album singles
"Ten Out of Ten"	2025	—	—	—	—	—	—	—	—	—	—		Non-album singles
"Tsunami"	2025	—	—	—	—	—	—	—	—	—	—		Non-album singles
"Where's Billy"	2025	—	—	—	—	—	—	—	—	—	—		Non-album singles
"I'll Be Waiting" (with Inna)	2025	—	—	—	—	—	—	—	—	—	—		Non-album singles
"Voodoo" (with Martin Garrix and Skytech)	2025	―	―	―	―	―	―	―	―	―	―		Origo
"Work" (with Kevin McKay, Pupa Nas T and Skytech featuring Denise Belfon and Fideles)	2025	—	—	—	—	—	—	—	—	—	—		Non-album singles
"In My Head"	2025	—	—	—	—	—	—	—	—	—	—		Non-album singles
"Dream Inside a Dream..."	2026	—	—	—	—	—	—	—	—	—	—		Non-album singles
"—" denotes a recording that did not chart or was not released in that territory.

=== As featured artist ===
Title	Year	Peak chart positions			Certifications	Album
Title	Year	AUS	US Club	US Dance	Certifications	Album
"You'll Be Mine" (Havana Brown featuring R3hab)	2012	—	—	—	ARIA: Platinum	When the Lights Go Out
"Big Banana" (Havana Brown featuring R3hab and Prophet)	2012	18	1	15	ARIA: Platinum	When the Lights Go Out
"Power" (EXO featuring R3hab)	2017	—	—	—		The War
"—" denotes a recording that did not chart or was not released in that territory.

=== Edited singles ===
Title	Year	Artist(s)	Album
"Count That" (R3HAB Edit)	2018	Steff Da Campo & SMACK	Non-album singles
"Out of My Mind" (R3HAB Edit)	2019	Skytech	Non-album singles

=== Promotional singles ===
Title	Year	Peak chart positions	Album
Title	Year	US Dance	Album
"Burnin'" (with Calvin Harris)	2014	37	Motion

== Remixes ==
2010

- DJ Mujava - "Please Mugwanti" (R3hab Remix)
- Franky Rizardo - "Afrika" (R3hab and Ferruccio Salvo Remix)
- Rene Amesz - "Coriander" (Hardwell and R3hab Remix)
- G&G - "We Just Criticize" (R3hab and Addy Van Der Zwan Remix)
- DJ Norman vs. Darkraver - "Kom Tie Dan Hé" (R3hab and Addy van der Zwan Remix)
- Issy featuring David Goncalves - "Physical Love" (R3hab Remix)
- Critical Mass - "Burning Love" (R3hab Remix)
- Bob Sinclar featuring Sean Paul - "Tik Tok" (Chuckie and R3hab Remix)

2011

- Addy Van Der Zwan featuring The Michael Zager Band - "Let's All Chant" (R3hab Remix)
- Ian Carey featuring Snoop Dogg and Bobby Anthony – "Last Night" (R3hab Remix)
- MYNC and Abigail Bailey - "Something On Your Mind" (R3hab Remix)
- Pitbull featuring Ne-Yo, Afrojack and Nayer - "Give Me Everything" (R3hab Remix)
- Ralvero - "Drunk Tonight" (R3hab and Ferruccio Salvo Remix)
- Lady Gaga - "Judas" (R3hab Remix)
- Dada Life - "Fight Club Is Closed" (R3hab and Ferruccio Salvo Remix)
- Hyper Crush - "Kick Us Out" (R3hab and DJ Frank E Remix)
- Gloria Estefan - "Wepa" (R3hab Remix)
- Luciana - "I'm Still Hot" (R3hab Remix)
- Porcelain Black featuring Lil Wayne - This Is What Rock n Roll Looks Like (R3hab's Ruby Skye Remix)
- Cahill featuring Joel Edwards - "In Case I Fall" (R3hab Remix)
- LMFAO featuring Natalia Kills - "Champagne Showers" (R3hab Remix)
- Rye Rye featuring Robyn - "Never Will Be Mine" (R3hab Remix)
- Wynter Gordon - "Til Death" (R3hab Remix)
- Calvin Harris featuring Kelis - "Bounce" (R3hab Remix)
- Rihanna featuring Calvin Harris - "We Found Love" (R3hab's XS Remix)
- Sander Van Doorn - "Koko" (R3hab Remix)
- Tiësto - "Maximal Crazy" (R3hab and Swanky Tunes Remix)
- Taio Cruz - "Troublemaker" (R3hab Remix)
- Jennifer Lopez - "Papi" (R3hab Remix)
- Skylar Grey - "Dance Without You" (R3hab Remix)
- David Guetta featuring Usher - "Without You" (R3hab's XS Remix)
- Porcelain Black - "Naughty Naughty" (R3hab's 6AM Pacha Mix)
- Qwote and Lucenzo - "Danza Kuduro (Throw Your Hands Up)" (R3hab's Dayglow Remix)
- Lady Gaga - "Marry The Night" (R3hab Remix)
- Katy Perry - "The One That Got Away" (R3hab Remix)
- Benny Benassi featuring Gary Go - "Close To Me" (R3hab Remix)
- Kaskade featuring Mindy Gledhill - "Eyes" (R3hab Remix)
- Far East Movement - "Jello" (R3hab Remix)
- Dev and Enrique Iglesias - "Naked" (R3hab Remix)

2012

- LMFAO - "Sorry For Party Rocking" (R3hab Remix)
- Adrian Lux - "Fire" (R3hab's Bigroom Remix)
- will.i.am - "Go Home" (R3hab vs The Eye Remix)
- Karmin - "Brokenhearted" (R3hab's XS Remix)
- Cassie - "King of Hearts" (R3hab Remix)
- Labrinth - "Last Time" (R3hab Remix)
- R3hab vs. Denis Naidanow - "Shuri Shuri" (R3hab Remix)
- Eric Turner - "Angels & Stars" (R3hab Club Mix)
- David Guetta - "I Can Only Imagine" (R3hab Remix)
- Eva Simons - "I Don't Like You" (R3hab Remix)
- Cosmo - "Naughty Party" (R3hab Remix)
- Sebastian Ingrosso & Alesso - "Calling (Lose My Mind)" (R3hab & Swanky Tunes Chainsaw Madness Mix)
- Pitbull - "Back in Time" (R3hab Remix)
- Usher - "Scream" (R3hab Remix)
- Afrojack & Shermanology - "Can't Stop Me Now" (R3hab andDyro Remix)
- Jay Sean feat. Pitbull - "I'm All Yours" (R3hab Remix)
- Calvin Harris feat. Example - "We'll Be Coming Back" (R3hab EDC Vegas Remix)
- Calvin Harris feat. Example - "We'll Be Coming Back" (R3hab EDC NYC Remix)
- Madonna - "Turn Up The Radio" (R3hab's Surrender Remix)
- Adam Lambert - "Never Close Our Eyes" (R3hab Oldskool Bounce Remix)
- Taryn Manning - "Send Me Your Love" (R3hab Remix)
- Far East Movement feat. Cover Drive - "Turn Up the Love" (R3hab Remix)
- Enrique Iglesias - "Finally Found You" (R3hab and ZROQ Remix)
- Meital feat. Sean Kingston - "On Ya" (R3hab Remix)
- Pitbull featuring TJR - "Don't Stop The Party" (R3hab and ZROQ Remix)
- Cherry Cherry Boom Boom - "One and Only" (R3hab Remix)
- Michael Woods - "We've Only Just Begun" (R3hab and ZROQ Remix)
- Havana Brown feat. R3hab - "You'll Be Mine" (R3hab and ZROQ Remix)
- Priyanka Chopra - "In My City" (R3hab and ZROQ Remix)
- No Doubt - "Looking Hot" (R3hab Remix)
- Example - "Perfect Replacement" (R3hab and Hard Rock Sofa Remix)

2013

- Pitbull feat. Ke$ha - "Timber" (R3hab Remix)
- Diplo feat. Nicky Da B - "Express Yourself" (R3hab & Diplo Remix)
- Rihanna - "What Now" (R3hab Remix)
- The Wombats - "Your Body Is a Weapon" (R3hab Remix)
- Cole Plante - "Lie to Me" (R3hab Remix)
- Yoko Ono feat. Dave Audé - "Hold Me" (R3hab Remix)
- David Guetta feat. Ne-Yo and Akon - "Play Hard" (R3hab Remix)
- Tiësto - "Chasing Summers" (R3hab & Quintino Remix)
- 7Lions - "Born 2 Run" (R3hab Remix)
- Just Ivy feat. Akon - "Paradise" (R3hab Remix)
- Irina feat. Dave Aude - "One Last Kiss" (R3hab Club Mix)
- NERVO - "Hold On" (R3hab & Silvio Ecomo Remix)
- Cher - "Woman's World" (R3hab Remix)
- Dan Black feat. Kelis - "Hearts" (Kaskade & R3hab Remix)
- Calvin Harris feat. Ellie Goulding - "I Need Your Love" (R3hab Remix)
- Yoko Ono - "Walking On Thin Ice" (R3hab Remix)

2014

- Tiësto feat. Matthew Koma – "Wasted" (R3hab Remix)
- Beyoncé – "Pretty Hurts" (R3hab Remix)
- Rita Ora – "I Will Never Let You Down" (R3hab Remix)
- My Crazy Girlfriend – "Stupid Love" (R3hab Remix)
- Gareth Emery feat. Krewella – "Lights and Thunder" (R3hab Remix)
- Calvin Harris – "Summer" (R3hab & Ummet Ozcan Remix)
- Darius & Finlay - "And I" (R3hab Remix)
- John Legend – "You & I (Nobody in the World)" (R3hab Remix)
- Calvin Harris feat. John Newman – "Blame" (R3HAB Club Remix)
- Calvin Harris feat. John Newman – "Blame"" (R3HAB Trap Remix)

2015

- Ciara - "I Bet" (R3hab Remix)
- Rihanna - "Bitch Better Have My Money" (R3hab Remix)
- Calvin Harris feat. HAIM - "Pray To God" (R3hab Remix)
- Axwell Λ Ingrosso - "Sun Is Shining" (R3hab Remix)
- Calvin Harris & Disciples - "How Deep Is Your Love" (Calvin Harris & R3hab Remix)
- ZZ Ward - "Love 3X" (R3hab Remix)
- Taylor Swift - "Wildest Dreams" (R3hab Remix)
- Nytrix – "Take Me Higher" (R3hab Remix)
- Bomba Estereo & Will Smith - "Fiesta" (R3hab Remix)

2016

- Rihanna feat. Drake - "Work" (R3hab Remix)
- Rihanna feat. Drake - "Work" (R3hab & Quintino Remix)
- Rihanna - "Kiss It Better" (R3hab Remix)
- Rihanna - "Needed Me" (R3hab Remix)
- Calvin Harris feat. Rihanna - "This Is What You Came For" (R3hab Remix / R3hab & Henry Fong Remix)
- The Chainsmokers feat. Halsey - "Closer" (R3hab Remix)
- Zara Larsson - "Ain't My Fault" (R3hab Remix)
- Major Lazer feat. Justin Bieber & MØ - "Cold Water" (R3hab vs Skytech Remix)
- Zara Larsson - "I Would Like" (R3hab Remix)

2017

- Migos - "Bad & Boujee" (R3hab vs No Riddim & It's Different Remix)
- Ella Vos - "White Noise" (R3hab Remix)
- DJ Snake feat. Justin Bieber - "Let Me Love You" (R3hab Remix)
- The Chainsmokers & Coldplay - "Something Just Like This" (R3hab Remix)
- Maroon 5 feat. Future - "Cold" (R3hab & Khrebto Remix)
- Clean Bandit feat. Zara Larsson - "Symphony" (R3hab remix)
- Bruno Mars - "24K Magic" (R3hab Remix)
- Kygo & Ellie Goulding - "First Time" (R3hab Remix)
- Ella Vos - "You Don't Know About Me" (R3hab Remix)
- Halsey - "Now Or Never" (R3hab Remix)
- Alina Baraz feat. Khalid - "Electric" (R3hab Remix)
- David Guetta feat. Justin Bieber - "2U" (R3hab Remix)
- Miley Cyrus - "Younger Now" (R3hab Remix)
- Dimitri Vegas & Like Mike and David Guetta - "Complicated" (R3hab Remix)
- EXO 엑소 - "Power" (R3hab Remix)
- Sigrid - "Strangers" (R3hab Remix)
- Jessie Ware - "Alone" (R3hab Remix)
- Rita Ora - "Anywhere" (R3hab Remix)
- Matoma feat. Noah Cyrus - "Slow" (R3hab Remix)
- Thirty Seconds to Mars - "Walk On Water" (R3hab Remix)

2018

- Rudimental featuring Jess Glynne, Macklemore and Dan Caplen - "These Days" (R3hab Remix)
- Lauv - "Getting Over You" (R3hab Remix)
- Greyson Chance - "Low" (R3hab Remix)
- Nina Nesbitt - "Somebody Special" (R3hab Remix)
- Marshmello - "Friends" (R3hab Remix)
- Calvin Harris and Dua Lipa - "One Kiss" (R3hab Remix)
- Kiiara - "Messy" (R3hab Remix)
- 5 Seconds of Summer - "Youngblood" (R3hab Remix)
- Mr Probz - "Space For Two"
- Lu Han - "Catch Me When I Fall" (R3hab Remix)
- Dan + Shay - "Tequila" (R3hab Remix)
- Sabrina Carpenter - "Almost Love" (R3hab Remix)
- David Guetta featuring Anne-Marie - "Don't Leave Me Alone" (R3hab Remix)
- Why Don't We - "8 Letters" (R3hab Remix)
- Frank Walker and R3hab featuring Riley Biederer - "Heartbreak Back" (R3hab Remix)
- Jonas Blue feat. Liam Payne and Lennon Stella - "Polaroid" (R3hab Remix)
- Jason Derulo and David Guetta featuring Nicki Minaj and Willy William - "Goodbye" (R3hab Remix)
- Glowie - "Body" (R3hab Remix)
- Charli XCX & Troye Sivan - "1999" (R3hab Remix)
- Nikki Vianna - "Done" (R3hab Remix)

2019

- Andy Grammer - "Don't Give Up On Me" (R3hab Remix)
- For King & Country - "Joy." (R3hab Remix)
- Kygo and Sandro Cavazza - "Happy Now" (R3hab Remix)
- Mabel - "Don't Call Me Up" (R3hab Remix)
- Tom Walker - "Just You and I" (R3hab Remix)
- Ocean Park Standoff - "Good Time" (R3hab Remix)
- Kazka - "Plakala" (R3hab Remix)
- The Chainsmokers featuring 5 Seconds of Summer - "Who Do You Love" (R3hab Remix)
- Digital Farm Animals featuring Danny Ocean - "Lookin' For" (R3hab Remix)
- P!nk - "Walk Me Home" (R3hab Remix)
- Sofi Tukker - "Fantasy" (R3hab Remix)
- For King & Country - "God Only Knows" (R3hab Remix)
- Mitchell Tenpenny - "Drunk Me" (R3hab Remix)
- Rammstein - "Ausländer" (R3hab Remix)
- NOTD and HRVY - "I Miss Myself" (R3hab Remix)
- David Guetta featuring Raye - "Stay" (David Guetta and R3hab Remix)
- Ally Brooke featuring A Boogie Wit Da Hoodie - "Lips Don't Lie" (R3hab Remix)
- Ina Wroldsen - "Forgive or Forget" (R3hab Remix)
- Katy Perry - "Never Really Over" (R3hab Remix)
- Miley Cyrus - "Mother's Daughter (R3hab Remix)
- Léon - "You and I" (R3hab Remix)
- Ellie Goulding and Juice Wrld - "Hate Me" (R3hab Remix)
- James Arthur and Ty Dolla Sign featuring Scotty Boy - "Treehouse" (R3hab Remix)
- For King & Country - "Burn the Ships" (R3hab Remix)
- Dimitri Vegas & Like Mike, David Guetta, Daddy Yankee, Afro Bros, and Natti Natasha - "Instagram" (R3hab Remix)
- Tom Walker – "Better Half of Me" (R3hab Remix)
- UVERworld - "ODD FUTURE (Remixed by R3HAB)"
- JP Cooper, Stefflon Don and Banx & Ranx — "The Reason Why" (R3hab Remix)
- Astrid S — "Favorite Part of Me" (R3hab Remix)

2020

- Arashi - "Turning Up (R3hab Remix)"
- R3hab and Miquela - "Money" (R3hab Remix)
- Connor Bvrns and Bonn - "Anthem" (R3hab Remix)
- Steve Aoki and Maluma - "Maldad" (R3hab Remix)
- Gregory Porter - "Revival" (R3hab Remix)
- Sofia Carson and R3hab - "I Luv U" (R3hab VIP Remix)
- Love Harder featuring Julie Bergan - "Outta My Head" (R3hab Remix)
- Caroline Romano - "I Still Remember" (R3hab Remix)
- Ella Isaacson featuring Galant - "Expectations" (R3hab Remix)
- End of the World featuring Gabrielle Aplin - "Over" (R3hab Remix)
- For King & Country featuring Kirk Franklin and Tori Kelly - "Together" (R3HAB Remix)
- Michele Morrone - "Hard For Me" (R3hab Remix)
- Jason Derulo - "Take You Dancing" (R3hab Remix)
- Wafia - "Good Things" (R3hab Remix)
- Stereo Jane - "I Don't Wanna Talk About Me" (R3hab Remix)
- Steve Malcom and Shaggy - "Fuego" (R3hab Remix)
- Weird Genius and Sara Fajira - "Lathi" (R3hab Remix)
- KSI featuring R3hab, Sean Paul, Craig David, Digital Farm Animals) - "Really Love" (R3hab Remix)
- Alan Walker and Salem Ilese - "Fake A Smile" (R3hab Remix)
- Ava Max - "EveryTime I Cry" (R3hab Remix)

2021

- Slander and Dylan Matthew - "Love Is Gone" (R3hab Remix)
- Rauw Alejandro - "Algo Mágico" (R3hab Remix)
- Twice - "Scientist" (R3hab Remix)
- Pitbull featuring Anthony Watts and DJWS - "I Feel Love" (R3hab Remix)
- R3hab and Lukas Graham - "Most People" (R3hab VIP Remix)
- Helene Fischer feat. Luis Fonsi – Vamos a Marte (R3HAB Remix)

2022

- Maisy Kay - "Scared Together" (R3hab Remix)
- For King & Country - "Relate" (R3hab Remix)
- (G)I-dle – "Tomboy" (R3hab Remix)
- EVERGLOW - "Pirate" (R3hab Remix)
- Sia - "Unstoppable" (R3hab Remix)
- Superfly - "Dynamite" (R3hab Remix)

2023

- Jordana Bryant - "Can I Get It Back" (R3HAB Remix)
- For King & Country - "Love Me Like I Am" (R3HAB Remix)

2026

- ATEEZ - "UP" (R3HAB Remix)

== Music videos ==
Title	Year	Ref.
"Get Get Down" (with Addy van der Zwan)	2010	
"You'll Be Mine" (Havana Brown featuring R3hab)	2012	
"Big Banana" (Havana Brown featuring R3hab and Prophet)	2013	
"Raise Those Hands" (with Bassjackers)	2013	
"Revolution" (with Nervo and Ummet Ozcan)	2013	
"Samurai (Go Hard)"	2014	
"Flashlight" (with Deorro)	2014	
"Revolution" (Audien Remix) (with Nervo and Ummet Ozcan)	2014	
"Samurai" (Tiësto Remix)	2014	
"How We Party" (with Vinai)	2014	
"Ready for the Weekend" (with Nervo featuring Ayah Marar)	2014	
"Soundwave" (with Trevor Guthrie)	2014	
"Burnin'" (with Calvin Harris)	2014	
"Karate" (with KSHMR)	2014	
"Phoenix" (with Sander van Doorn)	2015	
"Tiger" (vs. Skytech and Fafaq)	2015	
"Won't Stop Rocking" (with Headhunterz)	2015	
"Strong" (with KSHMR)	2015	
"Near Me" (with Burns)	2016	
"Freak" (with Quintino)	2016	
"Care" (with Felix Snow featuring Madi)	2016	
"Sakura"	2016	
"Icarus"	2016	
"I Just Can't" (with Quintino)	2017	
"Talking to You" (featuring Rynn)	2017	
"Shanghai" (with Waysons)	2017	
"Islands" (with KSHMR)	2017	
"Ain't That Why" (with Krewella)	2017	
