= Come Alive Tour =

Co-headlining concert tour by Mark Schultz and Point of Grace

- Tour by Mark Schultz & Point of Grace
- Associated album: Come Alive
- Start date: September 10, 2009
- End date: May 8, 2010
- Legs: 2
- No. of shows: 43

Mark Schultz & Point of Grace concert chronology
- n/a; Come Alive Tour (2009)

The Come Alive Tour was a national fall tour co-headlined by singer-songwriter Mark Schultz and singing trio Point of Grace. The tour was in support of Schultz' then-recent album Come Alive. It only toured the United States during fall 2009 and made a stop in Canada during spring 2010. The tour started on September 20, 2009 at Tabernacle Baptist Church in Decatur, Illinois and concluded on May 8, 2010 at Brunswock Community College in Supply, North Carolina.

== Background ==
On June 29, 2009, Schultz and Point of Grace announced the fall 2009 leg of the tour. Schultz sang songs from both his previous albums and his then-latest album, Come Alive, and Point of Grace sang songs from both their previous albums and their then-current 2007 album, How You Live.

On January 25, 2010, Schultz and Point of Grace announced the spring 2010 leg of the tour. While Schultz sang songs from both Come Alive and his previous albums, Point of Grace sang songs from both their previous albums and their then-recent album No Changin' Us.

== Commercial performance ==
Tickets for the fall 2009 leg of the tour were sold out in the first two hours of the announcement.

== Set list ==
This set list is representative of the September 18, 2009 show at Wesleyan Church in Hamburg, New York.

1. He Is
2. Come Alive
3. When You Give
4. Fall in Love Again
5. Broken & Beautiful
6. You Are a Child of Mine
7. He Will Carry Me
8. Back in His Arms Again
9. He's My Son
10. When You Come Home
11. I Am
12. Letters from War
13. Walking Her Home
14. Remember Me
15. Love Has Come

== Tour dates ==
List of 2009 concerts, showing date, city, state and venue
Date	City	State	Venue
September 10, 2009	Decatur	Illinois	Tabernacle Baptist Church
September 12, 2009	Marion	Illinois	Marion Cultural & Civic Center
September 13, 2009	Nashville	Tennessee	Two Rivers Baptist Church
September 17, 2009	Bradford	Pennsylvania	Bradford Area High School
September 18, 2009	Hamburg	New York	Wesleyan Church
September 19, 2009	Johnson City	New York	First Baptist Church of Johnson City
September 20, 2009	Worcester	Massachusetts	Mechanics Hall
September 25, 2009	Panama City	Florida	First Baptist Church of Panama City
September 26, 2009	Jacksonville	Florida	Westside Baptist Church
October 24, 2009	Sioux Center	Iowa	Dordt College
October 25, 2009	Davenport	Iowa	RiverCenter / Adler Theatre
November 1, 2009	Hoffman Estates	Illinois	Life Changers International Church
November 5, 2009	St. Cloud	Minnesota	St. Cloud Civic Center
November 6, 2009	Fargo	North Dakota	Bethel Church
November 7, 2009	Duluth	Minnesota	Denfeld High School Auditorium
November 8, 2009	Burlington	Iowa	Burlington Memorial Auditorium
November 12, 2009	Sheboygan	Wisconsin	Weill Center
November 13, 2009	Cleveland	Ohio	Allen Theatre
November 14, 2009	Jefferson	Wisconsin	Jefferson Performing Arts Center
November 20, 2009	Charlotte	North Carolina	Hickory Grove Baptist Church
November 21, 2009	Columbia	South Carolina	Columbia International University

List of 2010 concerts, showing date, city, venue and country
Date	City	Venue	Country
February 26, 2010	Appleton	Pathways Church	United States
February 27, 2010	Omaha	St. Andrews UMC	United States
February 28, 2010	Brookfield	Elmbrook Church	United States
March 6, 2010	Longview	S.E. Belcher Jr. Chapel & Performance Center	United States
March 9, 2010	Wichita Falls	Wichita Theater	United States
March 10, 2010	Midland	First Baptist Church	United States
March 12, 2010	Phoenix	North Hills Church	United States
March 14, 2010	Bakersfield	Jesus Shack	United States
March 19, 2010	Bend	Trinity Lutheran Church & School	United States
March 20, 2010	Vancouver	Broadway Church	Canada
March 21, 2010	East Wenatchee	Mt. View Assembly of God Church	United States
March 22, 2010	Lewiston	Valley Christian Center	United States
March 23, 2010	Spokane	Turning Point Open Bible Church	United States
March 25, 2010	Layton	Christian Life Center Church	United States
March 26, 2010	Casper	Faith Assembly of God	United States
April 15, 2010	Birch Run	Birch Run Expo Center	United States
April 16, 2010	Holland	Central Wesleyan Church	United States
April 17, 2010	Freeport	Masonic Temple of Freeport	United States
May 1, 2010	Meridian	Mt. Olivet Baptist Church	United States
May 2, 2010	Tifton	Northside Baptist Church of Tifton	United States
May 7, 2010	Apex	Hope Chapel	United States
May 8, 2010	Supply	Brunswock Community College	United States
