= Burn the Ships =

Studio album by For King & Country
- Released: 5 October 2018
- Recorded: 2017–2018
- Genres: CCM; pop rock; soft rock
- Length: 42:20
- Label: Word Entertainment
- Producers: For King & Country; Matt Hales; Blake Kanicka; Seth Mosley; Tedd Tjornhom

For King & Country studio album chronology
Run Wild. Live Free. Love Strong. (2014)	Burn the Ships (2018)	A Drummer Boy Christmas (2020)

Singles from Burn the Ships
- 1. "Joy" Released: 18 May 2018; 2. "Burn the Ships" Released: 30 August 2018; 3. "God Only Knows" Released: 11 January 2019; 4. "Amen" Released: 5 February 2021

Burn the Ships is the third studio album by For King & Country, an Australian Christian pop duo comprising brothers Luke Smallbone and Joel Smallbone, released via Word Entertainment on 5 October 2018. It features appearances from Moriah Peters and Courtney, the respective wives of Joel and Luke Smallbone. For King & Country collaborated with Matt Hales, Blake Kanicka, Seth Mosley and Tedd Tjornhom in the production of the album.

Burn the Ships was supported by the release of four singles, "Joy", "God Only Knows", "Burn the Ships", and "Amen". Each single was certified Gold with "God Only Knows" being certified two-times platinum in the United States by RIAA. The album was also marketed by two tours, Burn the Ships | Album Release Tour and Burn the Ships | World Tour. The album was a commercial success as it became For King & Country's highest charting debut on the US Billboard 200, launching at No. 7 with 62,000 equivalent album units sold in its first week, concurrently becoming the duo's first No. 1 entry on Billboard's Christian Albums chart.

Burn the Ships garnered critical acclaim for their creativity, songwriting and the Smallbone brothers' vocal style. At the 2020 Grammy Awards, the album won the Best Contemporary Christian Music Album, while a remixed version of "God Only Knows" which features vocals from Dolly Parton won Best Contemporary Christian Music Performance/Song.

== Background ==
In February 2017, the duo announced that they had begun work on their third studio album in Los Angeles. The album was a follow-up to For King & Country's commercially successful, critically acclaimed second effort, Run Wild. Live Free. Love Strong. released in 2014. In the four years between the releases, the Smallbone brothers worked on and released the film Priceless and the film's soundtrack in 2016, which, according to Luke Smallbone in the pair's interview with Billboard, held them back from returning to the studio. The duo also headlined the 2016 Winter Jam Tour Spectacular and had their song, "Ceasefire" featured as a music video for the 2016 film, Ben-Hur and also featured on the soundtrack to the 2017 film, The Shack, with a cover of "Amazing Grace". Skillet and the duo joined forces for the joy.UNLEASHED | The Tour which ran from mid-April through early May. When the tour concluded, the duo announced that they will release "Joy" as the first single from the album on 18 May 2018. For King & Country then released "Joy.", that day.

Joel Smallbone shared with his opinion with Billboard about the album:

It feels like the most mature record that we've made just in understanding who we are as a duo, who we are as men and maybe understanding life because we are a bit older than we were last time around,

— Joel Smallbone, Billboard

Luke Smallbone also shared with Billboard that they established, through their assessment of Run Wild. Live Free. Love Strong., that the songs which connected with their listeners the most are the ones that were personal, and set out to ensure that every song on the album would have a personal story attached to it. Joel also explained to People that "The album was built around this concept of 'where are we' socially, politically [and] as a nation."

The name of the album, as well as the title track, stems from a battle that Luke Smallbone's wife, Courtney, faced with an addiction to prescribed medication, coupled with an historical incident during the Spanish conquest of Mexico in 1519 AD, where a Spanish commander named Hernán Cortés, landed his ships on enemy shores unaware of what awaited his arrival. To ensure that the men were committed to their mission, he proclaimed, "Burn the ships!" Joel Smallbone expressed to Lee Clarion that Burn the Ships was "very much dedicated to the whole concept of no retreat, to very aggressively leave the past in the past and move forward."

== Music and lyrics ==
According to Timothy Monger of AllMusic, the music on the album, mixes the duo's "signature blend of dynamic rock and electronic pop with classical and choral elements". NewReleaseToday's Kevin Davis likened the "worshipful alt-rock style" to recent releases by Coldplay, Needtobreathe and Mat Kearney, declaring that the "entire project has a Brit-rock tinged worshipful vibe", while noting that it "doesn't conform to the pattern of typical CCM music". Robert Berman from Worship Musician Magazine described the album as being "in the same, hooky, Imagine Dragons/OneRepublic vein as their previous work, loaded with atmospheric keyboards in soaring arrangements". The album's lyrics explore the themes of "hope, forgiveness, faith, and new beginnings", whilst being "catchy and biblical". Brandon Callies from On Tour Monthly depicted the album as "an anthem filled offering from start to finish", with "a constant uplift from track to track", musically and lyrically.

The album opens with "Introit", is an instrumental intro. This is followed by "Joy", which is a "bursting, celebratory anthem" with an "upbeat hook and infectious melody". Described by Billboard as "a buoyant track backed by a 100-member choir" features a refrain from the popular song "Joy in My Heart" by George William Cooke. "God Only Knows" is an "emotional track full of hope", that tackles depression and suicide, which could "easily be paired with Imagine Dragons or Fun any day". The music video of "God Only Knows" ends with the number for the National Suicide Prevention Line. "Amen" is another song that also asserts the brothers' religious convictions, inspired by Luke Smallbone's rebaptism, that provides "a Latin flair and energy into the mix". The album's namesake track conveys the message of no retreat and leaving the past behind. "Burn the Ships" has been likened to the 1994 Steven Curtis Chapman song of the same name due to the inspiration drawn from the historical incident. "Fight On, Fighter" is a song dedicated to their wives, a follow-up to "Priceless". "Need You More" was born out of Luke's son's near-death experience, which leans sonically towards "more of a traditional praise and worship sound". "Control" is a song about letting go and letting God take the lead in life. "Never Give Up" which uses "a relaxed groove with soft beats and finger snapping" encouraging the listener to do just that. The penultimate song, "Hold Her" is a love song about the difficulties of being away from home, dramatising "the relational separations caused by a traveling musician's life on the road". The duo joins forces with their wives on the final track, "Pioneers", forming "an ABBA-esque quartet", to encourage married couples to carry on through the troubles they face.

== Artwork ==
The album cover image for Burn the Ships was shot in Iceland, serving as a "picturesque version of what it means to carry on within a seemingly desolate and volcanic framework".

== Release and promotion ==
On 13 May 2018, the duo announced that "Joy" will be released on 18 May and the song was availed for pre-order on iTunes and pre-saving on Spotify, with Spotify users being entered into a contest where the winner gets a trip to Nashville to attend an album listening party with the duo in the studio. The lead single "Joy" was released that day, with the song's accompanying music video exclusively released to Apple Music. The music video for "Joy" was released to YouTube two days later. In an interview with Billboard, the duo was questioned regarding the album's release date and its title given that some promotional materials suggested a May release, to which Luke Smallbone replied that the album would most likely come out in October. On 29 June 2018, For King & Country announced that their third studio album was titled Burn the Ships and would be released on 5 October 2018, with the album's pre-order period starting that day, as well as the availing of "Pioneers" featuring Moriah Peters and Courtney Smallbone (credited by their first names) as a promotional single from the album, as well as its accompanying music video. The duo also announced that it would avail a new song once a month in the lead-up to the album's release.

"God Only Knows" followed as the third promotional single from the album on 27 July 2018, the duo also releasing the song's music video. On 3 August 2018, For King & Country performed live on FOX & Friends. They went on to avail "Amen" as the fourth promotional single from the album during the pre-order period, as releasing the music video of the song. The album's title track, "Burn the Ships", was the fifth and final instant grat track from the album on 28 September 2018. The entire eleven-song collection was released on 5 October 2018, and the duo celebrated the album's release with the unveiling of the music video for "Burn the Ships".

== Singles ==
"Joy" was released on 18 May 2018 as the album's lead single. On 11 January 2019, "God Only Knows" was released to Christian radio becoming the second single from the album. "Burn the Ships" impacted Christian radio on 30 August 2018, as the album's third single. Amen was released to Christian radio becoming the fourth single from the album on 5 February 2021.

== Tours ==
The duo embarked on the Burn the Ships World tour from fall 2018 until spring 2020, in which it was ultimately postponed and then cancelled due to the COVID-19 pandemic.

== Critical reception ==
Professional ratings
Review scores
Source	Rating
365 Days of Inspiring Media	4.5/5
CCM Magazine	4.5/5 stars
The Christian Beat	4.7/5
Cross Rhythms	10/10 squares
Jesus Freak Hideout	3.5/5 stars 4/5 stars 3/5 stars
Today's Christian Entertainment	5/5

Burn the Ships prompted largely positive reactions, echoed in reviews about the collection from critics within the Contemporary Christian music genre. Joshua Andre rated the album four and a half out-of five at 365 Days of Inspiring Media, stating that Burn the Ships, though "captivating and powerful", was not as compelling as Run Wild. Live Free. Love Strong. AllMusic's Timothy Monger used "powerful" and "ambitious" as descriptors of the album. Reviewing for CCM Magazine, Jen Rose Yokel said of Burn the Ships: "with its epic soundscapes and energetic, hopeful songwriting, it's a pop album you won't want to miss". The Christian Beat contributor Emily Caroline wrote that "Burn the Ships is definitely a release to look forward to. The Smallbone brothers have a lot to share with this album, using their smooth, warm, relatable vocals and relatable songwriting to touch many." Bestowing a perfect ten square rating for Cross Rhythms, Tony Cummings concludes simply: "An absolute gem of an album." In a somewhat negative review from Jesus Freak Hideout, Michael Weaver rated the collection two stars, says "Burn the Ships isn't necessarily "safe," but it isn't as aspiring as their earlier work. However, the album has some very bright moments and some more poignant ones as well." Wayne Myatt gave a more favourable second opinion in a Jesus Freak Hideout review, acknowledging "They [For King & Country] have toned things down a bit on this release," as the band enters a new chapter in life but recommended to the duo's fans and "perhaps those who favor the lighter side of pop and rock music". The album came under scrutiny from an additional two cents piece by Jesus Freak Hideout's Alex Caldwell, describing the collection as "the tale of two albums", calling the first six tracks "being creative, energetic and compelling" yet the remainder are "b-sides that shouldn't have made the record." Christopher Smith was more optimistic in his Jesus Freak Hideout additional two cents piece, saying that the duo have crafted "their most cohesive album yet", deeming it "a highlight pop release of 2018". In a NewReleaseToday review, Kevin Davis believes "The album once again demonstrates multi-talented musicianship with creative, insightful lyrics and ear-grabbing melodies." Brandon Callies, in a positive On Tour Monthly review, optimistically expressed that the collection will impress the Christian pop fanbase, whilst asserting that the songs "really push the boundaries of what contemporary Christian music generally has to offer. There is certainly more mainstream appeal." Robert Berman lauded the album in his review at Worship Musician Magazine, declaring that Burn the Ships "deserves a listen from all fans of hopeful, faithful pop". Abby Baracksai specified in a perfect five-out-of-five rating track-by-track review for Today's Christian Entertainment, that the album is "absolutely fantastic. The music is wonderful and the lyrics are impactful." Today's Christian Entertainment, along with NewReleaseToday and CCM Magazine declared that the album is one of the best/top Christian records of 2018.

=== Accolades ===
Accolades for Burn the Ships
Year	Organization	Award	Result	Ref.
2019	We Love Christian Music Awards	The Hook Award (Pop Album of the Year)	Won	
2019	We Love Christian Music Awards	Album of the Year	Won	
2019	Billboard Music Awards	Top Christian Album	Nominated	
2019	GMA Dove Awards	Pop/Contemporary Album of the Year	Nominated	
2020	Grammy Award	Best Contemporary Christian Music Album	Won	

== Commercial performance ==
In the United States, Burn the Ships debuted at No. 7 on the mainstream Billboard 200 chart dated 20 October 2018, earning a career-best of 62,000 equivalent album units in sales in its first week. The album concurrently debuted at No. 1 on Billboard's Christian Albums chart that same week, was also the sixth best-selling digital release in the country that same week. The album was a milestone for the duo, as it was their first top 10 entry on the Billboard 200 chart, their first Christian Albums chart-topper and fifth top 10 on the Christian Albums chart. For King & Country also made their inaugural appearance with Burn the Ships on the all-genre Canadian Albums Chart issued by Billboard at No. 41.

In Australia, Burn the Ships debuted at No. 11 on the ARIA Digital Album Chart for the week commencing 15 October 2018. Burn the Ships launched at No. 3 on the Official Christian & Gospel Albums Chart dated 12–18 October 2018, as published by the Official Charts Company in the United Kingdom.

== Track listing ==
Burn the Ships
No.	Title	Writer(s)	Length
1.	"Introit"	Matt Hales; Blake Kanicka; Tedd Tjornhom	1:22
2.	"Joy"	Ben Glover; Hales; Kanicka; Seth Mosley; Joel Smallbone; Luke Smallbone; Tjornhom	3:54
3.	"God Only Knows"	Josh Kerr; Jordan Reynolds; J. Smallbone; L. Smallbone; Tjornhom	3:49
4.	"Amen"	Ryan Busbee; Michael James; Mosley; J. Smallbone; L. Smallbone; Tjornhom	3:47
5.	"Burn the Ships"	Hales; Mosley; J. Smallbone; L. Smallbone	4:36
6.	"Fight On, Fighter"	Benjamin Backus; Mark Campbell; Glover; J. Smallbone; L. Smallbone; Tjornhom	3:38
7.	"Need You More"	Rebecca Fink; Mosley; J. Smallbone; L. Smallbone; Tjornhom	3:36
8.	"Control"	Glover; Hales; Kerr; Reynolds; Kyle Rictor; J. Smallbone; L. Smallbone; Tjornhom	4:26
9.	"Never Give Up"	Fink; Jason Ingram; Mosley; J. Smallbone; L. Smallbone; Tjornhom	3:46
10.	"Hold Her"	Fink; J. Smallbone; L. Smallbone; Tjornhom	4:04
11.	"Pioneers" (featuring Moriah and Courtney)	Backus; Vince DiCarlo; Hales; Kanicka; Stephen Lynch; J. Smallbone; L. Smallbone	5:23
Total length:			42:20

Burn the Ships (Deluxe Edition: Remixes & Collaborations)
No.	Title	Writer(s)	Length
1.	"Introit"	Hales; Kanicka; Tjornhom	1:22
2.	"Joy"	Glover; Hales; Kanicka; Mosley; J. Smallbone; L. Smallbone; Tjornhom	3:54
3.	"God Only Knows"	Kerr; Reynolds; J. Smallbone; L. Smallbone; Tjornhom	3:49
4.	"Amen"	Busbee; James; Mosley; J. Smallbone; L. Smallbone; Tjornhom	3:47
5.	"Together" (with Tori Kelly and Kirk Franklin)	J. Smallbone; L. Smallbone; Ran Jackson; Ricky Jackson; Kerr; Kirk Franklin	3:26
6.	"Burn the Ships"	Hales; Mosley; J. Smallbone; L. Smallbone	4:36
7.	"Fight On, Fighter"	Backus; Campbell; Glover; J. Smallbone; L. Smallbone; Tjornhom	3:38
8.	"Need You More"	Fink; Mosley; J. Smallbone; L. Smallbone; Tjornhom	3:36
9.	"Control"	Glover; Hales; Kerr; Reynolds; Rictor; J. Smallbone; L. Smallbone; Tjornhom	4:26
10.	"Never Give Up"	Fink; Ingram; Mosley; J. Smallbone; L. Smallbone; Tjornhom	3:46
11.	"Hold Her"	Fink; J. Smallbone; L. Smallbone; Tjornhom	4:04
12.	"Pioneers" (featuring Moriah & Courtney)	Backus; DiCarlo; Hales; Kanicka; Lynch; J. Smallbone; L. Smallbone	5:23
13.	"Amen (Reborn)" (featuring Lecrae and The World Famous Tony Williams)	J. Smallbone; Lecrae Moore; L. Smallbone; Michael Busbee; Mosley; Tjornhom	4:43
14.	"God Only Knows" (featuring Dolly Parton)	Kerr; Reynolds; J. Smallbone; L. Smallbone; Tjornhom	3:33
15.	"Fight On, Fighter" (Theatrical Remix)	Backus; Campbell; Glover; J. Smallbone; L. Smallbone; Tjornhom
16.	"Joy" (Shadowlands Piano Remix)	Glover; Hales; Kanicka; Mosley; J. Smallbone; L. Smallbone; Tjornhom
17.	"God Only Knows" (featuring Echosmith; Timbaland Remix)	Kerr; Reynolds; J. Smallbone; L. Smallbone; Tjornhom	3:35
Total length:			58:37

Sample credits

- "Joy." contains an interpolation of the song, "Joy in My Heart" written by George William Cooke

== Personnel ==
- Benjamin Backus – arranger, background vocals, cello, dulcimer, editing, engineer, horn, piano, programming, string arrangements, strings
- Teddy Boldt – drums
- Mark Campbell – arranger, background vocals, editing, engineer, guitar, programming
- Courtney – featured artist
- Bethany Cruz – choir/chorus, vocals
- John Denosky – editing, engineer
- Jason Dering – editing, engineer
- Vince DiCarlo – acoustic guitar, background vocals, bass guitar, cello, horn
- For King & Country – arranger, primary artist, producer, programming
- Serban Ghenea – mixing
- Ainslie Grosser – editing, engineer, mixing
- Josh Gudwin – mixing
- Matt Hales – arranger, editing, engineer, producer, programming
- Jake Halm – arranger, background vocals, editing, engineer, mixing, programming, string arrangements, strings
- David Henry – cello, string arrangements, strings, viola, violin
- Hunter Jackson – mixing assistant
- Timmy Jones – drums
- Blake Kanicka – arranger, bass guitar, producer, engineer, programming
- Josh Kerr – arranger, programming
- Darren King – drums
- Joe LaPorta – mastering
- Carl Marsh – string arrangements, strings
- Julie Melucci – bass guitar, guitar
- Seth Mosley – arranger, producer
- Blair Munday – art direction
- Mike "X." O'Connor – editing, engineer
- Moriah Peters – featured artist, vocals
- Jordan Reynolds – arranger, programming
- Jonathan Richter – illustrations
- Mitchell Schleper – design, layout, photography
- Jerricho Scroggins – editing, engineer
- David Smallbone – production advisor
- Joel Smallbone – editing, engineer, piano
- Luke Smallbone – drums
- Jeff Sojka – editing, engineer, mixing
- Dan Stilling – photography
- Tedd Tjornhom – arranger, mixing, producer, programming

== Charts ==
=== Weekly charts ===
Weekly chart performance for Burn the Ships
Chart (2018–2019)	Peak position
Australian Albums (ARIA)	77
Belgian Albums (Ultratop Wallonia)	146
Canadian Albums (Billboard)	41
Dutch Albums (Album Top 100)	69
Swiss Albums (Schweizer Hitparade)	57
UK Album Downloads (Official Charts)	49
UK Christian & Gospel Albums (OCC)	3
US Billboard 200	7
US Top Christian Albums (Billboard)	1

=== Year-end charts ===
Year-end chart performance for Burn the Ships
Chart (2018)	Position
US Christian Albums (Billboard)	21
US Top Current Album Sales (Billboard)	105
Chart (2019)	Position
US Christian Albums (Billboard)	4
US Top Current Album Sales (Billboard)	32
Chart (2020)	Position
US Christian Albums (Billboard)	3
US Top Current Album Sales (Billboard)	166
Chart (2021)	Position
US Christian Albums (Billboard)	6
Chart (2022)	Position
US Christian Albums (Billboard)	10
Chart (2023)	Position
US Christian Albums (Billboard)	17
Chart (2025)	Position
US Christian Albums (Billboard)	28

=== Decade-end charts ===
Decade-end chart performance for Burn the Ships
Chart (2010s)	Position
US Christian Albums (Billboard)	46

== Certifications ==
Certifications for Burn the Ships
Region	Certification	Certified units/sales
United States (RIAA)	Platinum	1,000,000^{‡}
^{‡} Sales+streaming figures based on certification alone.

== Release history ==
Release history and formats for Burn the Ships
Region	Date	Format(s)	Label(s)	Ref.
Various	5 October 2018	CD; digital download; streaming; vinyl	Word Entertainment	
