= Joy (For King & Country song) =

Single by For King & Country

from the album Burn the Ships
- Released: 18 May 2018
- Genre: Christian pop; pop rock
- Length: 3:53
- Label: Word Entertainment
- Songwriters: Joel Smallbone; Luke Smallbone; Tedd T; Ben Glover; Seth Mosley; Blake Kanicka; Aqualung

For King & Country singles chronology
"O God Forgive Us" (2017)	"Joy" (2018)	"God Only Knows" (2019)

Music video
- "Joy" on YouTube

"Joy" (stylized as "joy.") is the lead single by Christian alternative rock duo For King & Country for their third studio album, Burn the Ships (2018). It was released as a single on 18 May 2018. The song became the group's highest charting single, peaking at No. 2 on the Hot Christian Songs chart. It lasted 36 weeks on the overall chart, being in the top ten for its entire run. It also peaked at No. 14 on the Billboard Bubbling Under Hot 100, and is their second highest charting entry in their career. The song is played in a C minor key, and 120 beats per minute.

It was nominated for the 2019 Grammy Award for Best Contemporary Christian Music Performance/Song. It was also nominated for Top Christian Song at the 2019 Billboard Music Awards.

== Background ==
"Joy" was released on 18 May 2018 as the lead single for their upcoming studio album, set to be released in autumn of 2018. The song is about raising positivity and taking out the negative in life. Both members of the group had their say on the song in an interview with Billboard:

"This song took six months to write, and we wrote it partly in Nashville, some in England, some in Los Angeles, and it was not a finicky song at all to write, we just have a long process. On the song itself, I think that people are so attached to their phones, screens, social media that you need to pause and see the joy, in human connection and interaction," says Joel. "Yes, we wanted to really concentrate on positivity in this song and leave out all the negativity. I feel like when people see the video, it will bring it home and make sense. There’s a real beauty in diversity and different opinions. If you can be open and free about it, that’s where the joy is," says Luke.

"Joy" contains an interpolation of the song, "Joy in My Heart" written by George William Cooke

== Critical reception ==
"Joy" was described by The Christian Beat as "bursting, celebratory anthem" with an "upbeat hook and infectious melody". Described by Billboard as "a buoyant track backed by a 100-member choir" features a refrain from the popular song "Joy in My Heart" by George William Cooke.

== Music video ==
The music video for the single "Joy" was released on 20 May 2018. Set in the 1960s, and a black and white clip follows the group as they lead the staff on a quest for joy. The production takes place during a television news broadcast. The visual features television personality Candace Cameron Bure. Bure and Joel Smallbone portray news presenters charged with information about a major storm threatening the country.

== Charts ==
=== Weekly charts ===
Chart (2018–19)	Peak position
UK Cross Rhythms Weekly Chart	1
US Bubbling Under Hot 100 (Billboard)	14
US Adult Contemporary (Billboard)	28
US Adult Pop Airplay (Billboard)	26
US Hot Christian Songs (Billboard)	2
US Christian Airplay (Billboard)	1
US Christian AC (Billboard)	1
US Digital Song Sales (Billboard)	26

=== Year-end charts ===
Chart (2018)	Peak position
UK Cross Rhythms Annual Chart	4
US Christian Airplay (Billboard)	4
US Christian Songs (Billboard)	5

=== Decade-end charts ===
Chart (2010s)	Position
US Christian Songs (Billboard)	28

== Certifications ==
Region	Certification	Certified units/sales
United States (RIAA)	Gold	500,000^{‡}
^{‡} Sales+streaming figures based on certification alone.
