= A Drummer Boy Christmas =

Studio album by For King & Country
- Released: 30 October 2020
- Recorded: 2020
- Genre: Christmas; CCM; Christian alternative rock
- Length: 44:47
- Label: Word Entertainment
- Producer: Tedd Tjornhom; For King & Country; Benjamin Backus

For King & Country chronology
Burn the Ships (2018)	A Drummer Boy Christmas (2020)	What Are We Waiting For? (2022)

Singles from A Drummer Boy Christmas
- 1. "O Come, O Come Emmanuel" Released: 2 October 2020; 2. "Little Drummer Boy" Released: 2 October 2020; 3. "Heavenly Hosts" Released: 3 November 2021

A Drummer Boy Christmas is the fourth studio album by For King & Country, an Australian Christian pop duo comprising brothers Luke Smallbone and Joel Smallbone, released via Word Entertainment on 30 October 2020. It features appearances by Needtobreathe and Gabby Barrett. The album was produced by Tedd Tjornhom and For King & Country, co-produced by Benjamin Backus, and Matt Hales handling executive production.

A Drummer Boy Christmas became a commercially successful album upon its release, debuting at No. 2 on Billboard's Top Christian Albums Chart in the United States. A Drummer Boy Christmas received nominations for the GMA Dove Award Christmas / Special Event Album of the Year and Recorded Music Packaging of the Year at the 2021 GMA Dove Awards.

== Background ==
In September 2020, For King & Country announced A Drummer Boy Christmas as their first full-length Christmas album, due to be out on 30 October 2020 and availing the album for pre-order. The album was inspired by a concept that originated near the band's beginning, when they Joel and Luke Smallbone were rehearsing for a Christmas tour. The album comprises two original Christmas songs: "Heavenly Hosts" and "The Carol of Joseph (I Believe In You)"; and contains guest appearances from Needtobreathe featuring on the track "O Come, O Come Emmanuel" while the song "Go Tell It On The Mountain" featuring guest vocals from Gabby Barrett.

== Release and promotion ==
=== Singles ===
On October 2, 2020, For King & Country announced that "O Come, O Come Emmanuel" featuring Needtobreathe and "Little Drummer Boy" would be serviced to Christian radio in the United States as the official singles from the album, revealing the album's track-listing.

"Heavenly Hosts" was serviced to Christian radio stations in the United States on 3 November 2021, becoming the album's third single.

=== Promotional singles ===
On October 2, 2020, For King & Country released "Joy to the World" as the first promotional single from the album, accompanied with a lyric video. On October 16, 2020, For King & Country released "Heavenly Hosts" as the second and final promotional single from the album, accompanied with a lyric video.

=== Touring ===
Through November and December in the years of 2020–2025, the band toured around the United States, Canada and the United Kingdom in promotion of the album.

== Reception ==
=== Critical response ===
Professional ratings
Review scores
Source	Rating
Jesus Freak Hideout	4/5 stars

Jesus Freak Hideout's John Underdown noted the oddity in following up a successful album (Burn the Ships) with a holiday themed album, but acknowledged the band's success, saying: "Ultimately, what sets this album above its peers is the direction and purpose behind the songs picked and the way they're ordered. This thoughtfulness is felt and allows for deeper layers of reflection where other Christmas records only provide background fluff." In a positive review for NewReleaseToday, JJ Francesco opined that A Drummer Boy Christmas is "a reverent and intimate Christmas pageant of an album."

=== Accolades ===
Awards
Year	Organization	Award	Result	Ref
2021	GMA Dove Awards	Christmas / Special Event Album of the Year	Won	
2021	GMA Dove Awards	Recorded Music Packaging of the Year	Nominated	

== Commercial performance ==
In the United States, A Drummer Boy Christmas earned 13,000 equivalent album units in its first week of sales, and as a result debuted at No. 2 on the Top Christian Albums Chart dated November 14, 2020, the band's sixth top ten release on the tally. The album concurrently registered on the mainstream Billboard 200 chart at No. 50.

== Track listing ==
A Drummer Boy Christmas track listing
No.	Title	Writer(s)	Length
1.	"In the Bleak Midwinter" (Prologue)	Christina Rossetti	1:12
2.	"Joy to the World"	Isaac Watts	3:55
3.	"O Come, O Come Emmanuel" (featuring Needtobreathe)	Traditional	4:19
4.	"Won't You Come"	Benjamin Backus; Joel Smallbone; Luke Smallbone; Mark Campbell; Stephen Blake Kanicka; Stephen Lynch; Timmy Jones; Vince Dicarlo	1:32
5.	"Heavenly Hosts"	Backus; J. Smallbone; L. Smallbone; Matt Hales; Tedd Tjornhom; Tony Wood	3:29
6.	"Silent Night"	Franz Xaver Gruber; Joseph Mohr	4:49
7.	"A Christmas Monologue"	Backus; J. Smallbone; L. Smallbone; Tjornhom	1:37
8.	"Little Drummer Boy"	Harry Simeone; Henry V. Onorati; Katherine K. Davis	4:48
9.	"The Carol of Joseph (I Believe in You)"	J. Smallbone; L. Smallbone; Hales	4:02
10.	"O Come All Ye Faithful"	Traditional	5:17
11.	"Go Tell It on the Mountain" (with Gabby Barrett)	John Wesley Work Jr.	3:38
12.	"Angels We Have Heard on High"	Traditional	4:40
13.	"In the Bleak Midwinter" (Epilogue)	Rossetti	1:29
Total length:			44:47

== Charts ==
=== Weekly charts ===
Weekly chart performance for A Drummer Boy Christmas
Chart (2020–2025)	Peak position
US Billboard 200	50
US Top Christian Albums (Billboard)	1
US Independent Albums (Billboard)	9
US Top Holiday Albums (Billboard)	2

=== Year-end charts ===
Year-end chart performance for A Drummer Boy Christmas
Chart (2020)	Position
US Christian Albums (Billboard)	71
Chart (2021)	Position
US Christian Albums (Billboard)	34
Chart (2022)	Position
US Christian Albums (Billboard)	42
Chart (2023)	Position
US Christian Albums (Billboard)	48
Chart (2025)	Position
US Christian Albums (Billboard)	46

== Release history ==
Release history and formats for A Drummer Boy Christmas
Region	Date	Format(s)	Label(s)	Ref.
Various	30 October 2020	CD; digital download; streaming	Word Entertainment	
