= THRDL!FE =

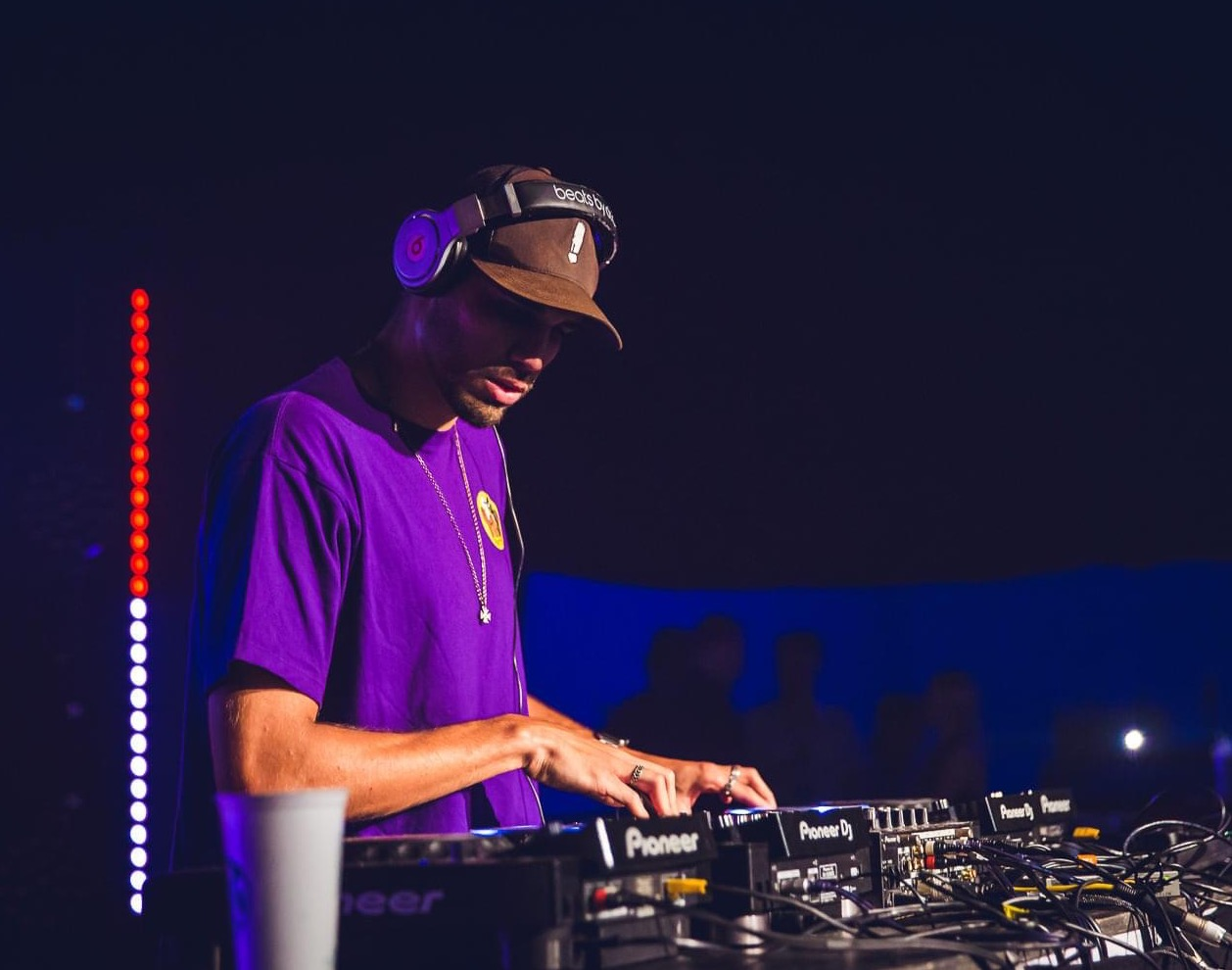

Background information
- Born: Jake Brian Tench; 14 September 1992 (age 34); London, England
- Genres: Dance music, electronica, pop
- Occupations: DJ, record producer, songwriter
- Years active: 2017-present
- Labels: Ministry of Sound, Ultra, Sony Music, Good Company, Warner Music, 3beat, Universal Music

Jake Brian Tench (born 14 September 1992), known professionally as THRDL!FE (pronounced "third life'), is a British record producer, DJ, and songwriter. He is known for his singles "Hear Me Tonight" with Alok, "Wrong Move" with R3HAB & Olivia Holt, "For Love" with Mario and Kelli-Leigh among others. He has also written, produced and remixed records for numerous other notable artists including Marshmello, Jess Glynne, Twice.

== Discography ==
Title	Year	Album	Certification
Can't Buy Love (featuring SAARA)	2017	TBA	
For Love (with Kelli-Leigh & Mario)	2017	TBA	
Wrong Move (with R3HAB & Olivia Holt)	2018	The Wave	
Worst In Me (with MOTi & Carla Monroe)	2019	non-album single	
Outta My Head	2019	TBA	
Secure The Bag (With Nadia Rose)	2020	TBA	
Hear Me Tonight (With Alok)	2020	non-album single	Pro-Música: Diamond
Turn Me Up (With Johnny Drille)	2021	TBA	
Seven Days (With Conor Maynard)	2021	TBA	
Bitter Heart (With Thando1988 & Anton Karskiy [ft Billy Vena])	2022	TBA	

Remixes
Title	Year	Original Artist
"Big Picture"	2017	London Grammar
"You Can Cry"	2018	Marshmello & Juicy J featuring James Arthur
"Lie To Me"	2018	Steve Aoki featuring Ina Wroldsen
"All I Am"	2018	Jess Glynne
"Dumpling"	2020	Stylo G, Sean Paul, Spice

Notable Productions
Title	Credited Artist	Year	Album	Certification
Strawberry	Twice	2019	Fancy You	KMCA: Platinum
