= Burn the Ships (song) =

Single by For King & Country

from the album Burn the Ships
- Released: 30 August 2018
- Genre: CCM; pop rock
- Length: 3:40
- Label: Word Entertainment
- Songwriters: Matt Hales; Seth Mosley; Joel Smallbone; Luke Smallbone

For King & Country singles chronology
| "God Only Knows" (2018) | "Burn the Ships" (2018) | "Together" (2020) |

Music video
- "Burn the Ships" on YouTube

"Burn the Ships" is a song performed by an Australian Christian pop duo For King & Country. The song was released to Christian radio in the United States on 30 August 2018, becoming the third single from Burn the Ships (2018). The song was written by Matt Hales, Seth Mosley, Joel Smallbone and Luke Smallbone.

The song peaked at No. 3 on the US Hot Christian Songs chart, becoming their eleventh top ten single.

== Background ==
"Burn the Ships" was initially released on 28 September 2018 as the fifth promotional single from Burn the Ships (2018). In an interview with Billboard, the duo shared the inspiration of the song, saying that it came from Luke Smallbone's wife, Courtney, battling with an addiction to prescription drugs, combined with a historical incident during the Spanish conquest of Mexico in 1519, when Hernán Cortés landed his ships on enemy shores unaware of what awaited his arrival. To ensure that his men were committed to their mission, he proclaimed, "Burn the ships!" Luke Smallbone shared in an interview with NewReleaseToday that the song became the album's title track after realising that the theme of "no retreat" was recurring on the album especially in songs like "Never Give Up" and "Fight On, Fighter" and he opined that "it makes the album and the title feel potent."

The song was released to Christian radio in the United States on 30 August 2019, becoming Burn the Ships' third official single. A radio-adapted version of the song was released in digital format on 27 September 2019. On 4 October 2019, For King & Country released a remix of the song by R3hab.

== Composition ==
"Burn the Ships" composed in the key of F major with a tempo of 94 beats per minute. For King & Country's vocal range spans from C_{3} to C_{5}.

== Commercial performance ==
The song reached No. 1 on Billboard's Christian Airplay chart. It has sold 32,000 copies in the United States as of November 2019.

== Music video ==
The music video of "Burn the Ships" was published on For King & Country's YouTube channel on 5 October 2018, celebrating the release of the album, which arrived on the same day. It was filmed on Lady Washington, the duo singing aboard the ship before leaving an explosive and retreating to shore.

== Accolades ==
Awards
| Year | Organization | Award | Result | Ref |
|---|---|---|---|---|
| 2020 | GMA Dove Awards | Song of the Year | Nominated | |
| 2020 | GMA Dove Awards | Pop/Contemporary Recorded Song of the Year | Nominated | |

== Track listing ==
"Burn the Ships" (Single Edit)
| No. | Title | Writer(s) | Length |
|---|---|---|---|
| 1. | "Burn the Ships" (Single Edit) | Matt Hales; Seth Mosley; Joel Smallbone; Luke Smallbone | 3:40 |

"Burn the Ships" (R3hab Remix)
| No. | Title | Length |
|---|---|---|
| 1. | "Burn the Ships" (R3hab Remix) | 2:26 |

== Charts ==
=== Weekly charts ===
Weekly chart performance for "Burn the Ships"
| Chart (2018–20) | Peak position |
|---|---|
| UK Cross Rhythms Weekly Chart | 1 |
| US Bubbling Under Hot 100 (Billboard) | 20 |
| US Hot Christian Songs (Billboard) | 3 |
| US Christian AC (Billboard) | 1 |

=== Year-end charts ===
2019 year-end chart performance for "Burn the Ships"
| Chart (2019) | Position |
|---|---|
| US Christian Songs (Billboard) | 45 |
| US Christian Airplay (Billboard) | 38 |
| US Christian AC (Billboard) | 40 |
| US Christian CHR (Billboard) | 35 |

2020 year-end chart performance for "Burn the Ships"
| Chart (2020) | Position |
|---|---|
| UK Cross Rhythms Annual Chart | 19 |
| US Christian Songs (Billboard) | 15 |
| US Christian Airplay (Billboard) | 15 |
| US Christian AC (Billboard) | 17 |
| US Christian CHR (Billboard) | 1 |

== Certifications ==
| Region | Certification | Certified units/sales |
|---|---|---|
| United States (RIAA) | Platinum | 1,000,000^{‡} |
^{‡} Sales+streaming figures based on certification alone.

== Release history ==
| Region | Date | Version | Format | Label | Ref. |
|---|---|---|---|---|---|
| United States | 30 August 2019 | Single | Christian contemporary hit radio | Word Entertainment | |
| Various | 27 September 2019 | Single | Digital download; streaming | Word Entertainment | |
| Various | 4 October 2019 | R3hab remix | Digital download; streaming | Word Entertainment | |
