= God Only Knows (For King & Country song) =

Single by For King & Country

from the album Burn the Ships
- Released: 11 January 2019
- Recorded: 2017–2018
- Length: 3:49 (album version); 3:25 (radio version)
- Label: Word Entertainment
- Songwriters: Josh Kerr; Jordan Reynolds; Joel Smallbone; Luke Smallbone; Tedd Tjornhom
- Producers: For King & Country; Matt Hales; Blake Kanicka

For King & Country singles chronology
"Joy" (2018)	"God Only Knows" (2019)	"Burn the Ships" (2019)

Music video
- "God Only Knows" on YouTube

Remix cover
- Dolly Parton remix cover

Dolly Parton singles chronology
"I Will Always Love You" (2019)	"God Only Knows" (2019)	"There Was Jesus" (2019)

Music video
- "God Only Knows" (with Dolly Parton) on YouTube

"God Only Knows" is the second single by Christian pop duo For King & Country for their third studio album, Burn the Ships (2018). It was originally released as the third promotional single on 27 July 2018. It impacted Christian radio on 11 January 2019. The song peaked at No. 2 on the US Hot Christian Songs chart, becoming their tenth top-ten single. It also peaked at No. 94 on the Billboard Hot 100, becoming the duo's first song to reach the chart. The song is played in a B minor key, and 144 beats per minute.

== Background ==
"God Only Knows" was released as the third promotional single from Burn the Ships on 27 July 2018; the duo also released the song's music video. On 11 January 2019, "God Only Knows" was released to Christian radio as the second single from the album. In an interview with Free CCM, the duo explained the message behind the song:

"God Only Knows" is one of those songs that you know... there are inward songs that were written about specific circumstances and you hope someone else resonates with them. This was a song looking out. There seems to be a lot of you saying this, you did this, how dare you. The song is a question mark of well, first of all, do we understand each other fully? Our histories, our family heritages, the struggles in life, the things that have been done to us that no one knows about. The shame that we carry. Some of it we've done to ourselves, that's self-sabotage. Some of it other people have done to us. You're just seeing a brief moment in time of that person. What if we pulled the lens back? Even if we did, there are some things that God does only know. We've got our shame, we've got our troubles, we've got our prejudice, we've got our judgements. God knows your heart and in turn, the flip of that is, God also carries this love that is sort of the superman of all love. We kind of are image bearers and so we emulate it, but it's just this wonderful superhuman love that if we lean into it'd be a beautiful thing. But so often we don't understand because we're stuck in a human variation of it.

== Composition ==
"God Only Knows" is originally in the key of B minor, with a tempo of 144 beats per minute. Written in common time, Smallbone's vocal range spans from A_{2} to G_{4} during the song.

== Commercial performance ==
It debuted at No. 20 on the Hot Christian Songs chart, despite not being an official single. The song left the chart after reaching twenty weeks. After being released as a single, the song re-entered the chart at No. 19 on the issue week of 12 January 2019. The song reached the Top 10 after twenty-three weeks. It went on to peak at No. 2, where it stayed there for a record nineteen weeks. It became their longest charting single at 60 weeks. It debuted at No. 24 on the Billboard Christian Airplay chart on the issue week of 19 January 2019. It reached the top ten on its sixth week. It became their fifth leader, staying there for ten weeks.

The song debuted on the Billboard Bubbling Under Hot 100 chart, at No. 25. The song re-entered the chart at No. 6, after the Timbaland remix. The song finally debuted on the Billboard Hot 100 at No. 94, boosted by a Dolly Parton remix.

== Critical reception ==
"God Only Knows" was described as an "emotional track full of hope," that tackles depression and suicide, which could "easily be paired with Imagine Dragons or Fun[.] any day."

=== Accolades ===
Year	Organization	Award	Result	Ref.
2019	We Love Christian Music Awards	Music Video of the Year	Won	
2020	Grammy Awards	Best Contemporary Christian Music Performance/Song	Won	
2020	Billboard Music Awards	Top Christian Song	Won	

== Music video ==
The music video of "God Only Knows" features a young woman (played by an actress Masey McLain) who is found in dark desperation and believes suicide is the answer. "Circumstantially things are good, she's an attractive woman, she lives in a beautiful home and life is sort of looking good. Yet there are these things, these underlying insecurities that are shifting the way she perceives life and people perceive her," band member Joel Smallbone revealed in the behind the scenes video. The music video shows the woman presumably committing suicide by jumping off a bridge. The video then explains what could have happened if a friend she confronted that day might have been there for her at her worst point. The friend's care results in a different ending to the day. "The power of someone interacting, showing a small act of kindness, a hug, a smile, and how that just changes the trajectory of her life [on] this one particular day, which was a very crucial day in this young lady's life," Smallbone followed up his previous comment. It ends with the number for the National Suicide Prevention Line.

== Track listing ==
CD release

1. "God Only Knows" – 3:49
2. "God Only Knows" (Lead Sheet (Medium Key) – 3:49
3. "God Only Knows" (Vocal Demonstration) – 3:47
4. "God Only Knows" (High Key With Background Vocals) – 3:47
5. "God Only Knows" (High Key Without Background Vocals) – 3:47
6. "God Only Knows" (Medium Key With Background Vocals) – 3:47
7. "God Only Knows" (Medium Key Without Background Vocals) – 3:47
8. "God Only Knows" (Low Key With Background Vocals) – 3:47
9. "God Only Knows" (Low Key Without Background Vocals) – 3:47

== Charts ==
=== Weekly charts ===
Weekly chart performance for "God Only Knows"
Chart (2018–2020)	Peak position
US Billboard Hot 100	94
US Adult Contemporary (Billboard)	17
US Adult Pop Airplay (Billboard)	21
US Hot Christian Songs (Billboard)	2
US Christian Airplay (Billboard)	1

Chart (2026)	Peak position
US Digital Song Sales (Billboard)	15

Weekly chart performance for "God Only Knows (Dolly Parton Remix)"
Chart (2019)	Peak position
US Christian Airplay (Billboard)	41

=== Year-end charts ===
2018 year-end chart performance for "God Only Knows"
Chart (2018)	Position
US Christian Songs (Billboard)	78

2019 year-end chart performance for "God Only Knows"
Chart (2019)	Position
US Christian Songs (Billboard)	2
US Christian Airplay (Billboard)	1
US Christian CHR (Billboard)	1
US Christian AC (Billboard)	1

2020 year-end chart performance for "God Only Knows"
Chart (2020)	Position
US Adult Contemporary (Billboard)	39
US Christian Digital Song Sales (Billboard)	5
US Christian Streaming Songs (Billboard)	7

=== Decade-end charts ===
Decade-end chart performance for "God Only Knows"
Chart (2010s)	Position
US Christian Songs (Billboard)	24

== Certifications ==
Region	Certification	Certified units/sales
United States (RIAA)	2× Platinum	2,000,000^{‡}
^{‡} Sales+streaming figures based on certification alone.
