= Together (For King & Country, Tori Kelly and Kirk Franklin song) =

Single by For King & Country, Tori Kelly and Kirk Franklin
- Released: 1 May 2020
- Genre: Contemporary Christian music
- Length: 3:26
- Label: Word Entertainment
- Songwriters: Joel Smallbone; Luke Smallbone; Ran Jackson; Ricky Jackson; Josh Kerr; Kirk Franklin
- Producers: Federico Vindver; Josh Kerr; Benjamin Backus

For King & Country singles chronology
"Burn the Ships" (2019)	"Together" (2020)	"O Come, O Come Emmanuel" (2020)

Tori Kelly singles chronology
"Reckless Love" (2020)	"Together" (2020)	"Time Flies" (2020)

Kirk Franklin singles chronology
"Millionaire (Good Like That)" (2020)	"Together" (2020)	"We Win" (2021)

Music video
- "Together" on YouTube

"Together" is a song performed by an Australian Christian pop duo For King & Country with American singer Tori Kelly and American gospel musician Kirk Franklin. It was released as a standalone single on 1 May 2020. It was later included on the deluxe edition of the duo's third studio album Burn the Ships (2018), as well as their fifth studio album, What Are We Waiting For? (2022). The song was written by duo members Joel and Luke Smallbone, alongside Ran Jackson, Ricky Jackson. and Franklin.

"Together" peaked at No. 2 on the US Hot Christian Songs chart. The song also went on to peak at No. 23 on the Bubbling Under Hot 100 chart. "Together" received nominations for the GMA Dove Award Song of the Year and Pop/Contemporary Recorded Song of the Year at the 2021 GMA Dove Awards.

"Together" was certified gold by the RIAA on August 17, 2022 for selling 500,000 copies.

== Background ==
On 26 March 2020, For King & Country announced that they will hold a livestream event dubbed Together: A Night of Hope, slated for 27 March, where the duo would be performing with their band members as well as share stories, The duo also announced that Kirk Franklin and Kathie Lee Gifford would be special guests, and there would be an exclusive premiere of a new song during the livestream. The duo played the song "Together" during the event, which drew ninety thousand live impressions across various platforms. On 28 April 2020, For King & Country announced that they will be appearing on Good Morning America and performing the new song "Together" on 1 May.

The duo performed the song on Good Morning America with Tori Kelly and Kirk Franklin, joining them for a multi-screen performance. "Together" was released in digital format on 1 May 2020. The song impacted Christian radio stations on 22 May 2020.

== Writing and development ==
Following the duo's running into Kirk Franklin at the 2020 Grammys, they sent the song to him and Franklin wrote the bridge, bringing in his choir and band. The duo wanted a female vocal for the song, so they later reached out Tori Kelly, who then sent back her vocals.

== Composition ==
"Together" is composed in the key of C minor with a tempo of 89 beats per minute.

== Accolades ==
Awards
Year	Organization	Award	Result	Ref
2021	Billboard Music Awards	Top Christian Song	Nominated	
2021	GMA Dove Awards	Song of the Year	Nominated	
2021	GMA Dove Awards	Pop/Contemporary Recorded Song of the Year	Nominated	

== Music video ==
The music video of "Together" was published on For King & Country's YouTube channel on 5 May 2020. The music video was filmed in quarantine from the homes of the singers during the COVID-19 pandemic, with each artist performing in front of a black backdrop. Messages of struggle, perseverance and optimism in the form of fan-submitted posters were featured in the music video.

== Live performances ==
On 1 May 2020, For King & Country performed the song live on the television program Good Morning America.

== Track listing ==
"Together"
No.	Title	Writer(s)	Length
1.	"Together"	Kirk Franklin; Joel Smallbone; Josh Kerr; Ricky Jackson; Ran Jackson; Luke Smallbone	3:26

"Together (R3hab Remix)"
No.	Title	Length
1.	"Together" (R3hab Remix)	2:37

"Together (Acoustic Version)"
No.	Title	Length
1.	"Together" (Acoustic Version; with Cory Asbury and Rebecca St. James)	3:36

== Charts ==
=== Weekly charts ===
Weekly chart performance for "Together"
Chart (2020)	Peak position
Canada Hot Canadian Digital Songs (Billboard)	43
New Zealand Hot Singles (RMNZ)	29
UK Cross Rhythms Weekly Chart	2
US Bubbling Under Hot 100 (Billboard)	20
US Adult Contemporary (Billboard)	15
US Adult Pop Airplay (Billboard)	23
US Hot Christian Songs (Billboard)	2
US Christian Airplay (Billboard)	1
US Christian AC (Billboard)	1
US Digital Song Sales (Billboard)	6

Weekly chart performance for "Together (R3hab Remix)"
Chart (2021)	Peak position
UK Cross Rhythms Weekly Chart	8

=== Year-end charts ===
2020 year-end chart performance for "Together"
Chart (2020)	Position
UK Cross Rhythms Annual Chart	16
US Adult Contemporary (Billboard)	32
US Christian Songs (Billboard)	7
US Christian Airplay (Billboard)	11
US Christian AC (Billboard)	6

== Release history ==
Region	Version	Date	Format	Label	Ref.
Various	Original	1 May 2020	Digital download; streaming	Word Entertainment	
United States	Original	22 May 2020	Christian radio	Word Entertainment	
Various	R3hab Remix	24 July 2020	Digital download; streaming	Word Entertainment	
Various	Acoustic Version (with Cory Asbury and Rebecca St. James)	2 September 2020	Digital download; streaming	Word Entertainment	
