= Stories & Songs (Mark Schultz album) =

Studio album by Mark Schultz
- Released: October 14, 2003
- Genre: CCM
- Length: 44:48
- Label: Word
- Producer: Brown Bannister

Mark Schultz chronology
Song Cinema (2001)	Stories & Songs (2003)	Live... A Night of Stories and Songs (2005)

Singles from Stories & Songs
- 1. "You Are a Child of Mine" Released: 2003; 2. "Letters From War" Released: 2004; 3. "He Will Carry Me" Released: 2004

Professional ratings
Review scores
Source	Rating
Jesus Freak Hideout	4/5 stars

Stories & Songs is the third album released by Contemporary Christian artist Mark Schultz. It was released on October 14, 2003.

== Track listing ==
All songs written by Mark Schultz, except where noted.

1. "You Are a Child of Mine" (Schultz, Chris Eaton) - 4:56
2. "Everywhere" (Schultz, Brown Bannister) - 3:11
3. "Letters From War" (Schultz, Cindy Morgan) - 4:15
4. "Do You Even Know Me Anymore" - 4:09
5. "Time That Is Left" - 3:56
6. "Running Just to Catch Myself" - 5:17
7. "It's Been a Long Time" - 4:27
8. "He Will Carry Me" (Schultz, Dennis Kurttila, Sampson Brueher) - 4:32
9. "Just to Know You" - 4:14
10. "Closer to You" - 4:48
11. "Time That Is Left (Reprised)" - 2:29

== Personnel ==
- Mark Schultz – lead vocals, backing vocals, whistle (6)
- Shane Keister – acoustic piano
- Matt Rollings – acoustic piano
- Blair Masters – keyboards
- Jeff Roach – keyboards
- Gordon Kennedy – electric guitar, guitars
- Jerry McPherson – acoustic guitar, electric guitar, guitars
- Bryan Sutton – acoustic guitar
- Tom Hemby – bouzouki, mandolin
- Mark Hill – bass
- Jimmie Lee Sloas – bass
- Steve Brewster – drums
- Dan Needham – drums
- Eric Darken – percussion
- John Catchings – cello
- Carl Marsh – orchestral and horn arrangements, conductor
- The London Session Orchestra – strings, horns
- Gavyn Wright – concertmaster
- Gene Miller – backing vocals
- Ellie Holcomb – backing vocals (5)
- Tim Davis – backing vocals (6)

=== Production ===
- Producer – Brown Bannister
- A&R – Burton Brooks and Shawn McSpadden
- Engineers – Steve Bishir and Danny Duncan
- Assistant Engineer and Digital Editing – Hank Nirider
- Mixing – Steve Bishir
- Mastered by Stephen Marcussen at Marcussen Mastering (Hollywood, CA).
- Production Coordination – Traci Sterling Bishir, assisted by Miche Bentrem.
- Creative Direction – Tammie Harris Cleek and Katherine Petillo
- Art Direction – Katherine Petillo
- Design and Layout – Wayne Brezinka
- Photography – Michael Gomez and Michael Wilson
- Stylist – Claudia Fowler
- Hair and Makeup – Robin Geary and Lori Turk

== Charts ==
=== Singles ===
Year	Single	Peak chart positions				
Year	Single	US Christian Songs	US Christian AC	Christian AC Indicator	Soft Adult Contemporary/ Inspirational	Year End Christ
2003	"You Are a Child of Mine"	3	1	1	1	7
2004	"Letters From War"	5	5	3	3	25
2004	"He Will Carry Me"	5	5	4	1	24
