= Song Cinema =

Studio album by Mark Schultz
- Released: October 17, 2001
- Studios: The Bennett House, Dark Horse Recording Studio, The Spank Factory, Screaming Baby and The Castle (Franklin, Tennessee); Bridgeway Studios, Sound Stage Studios and Charlie Peacock Productions (Nashville, Tennessee)
- Genres: CCM; pop
- Length: 44:42
- Label: Word Entertainment
- Producer: Monroe Jones

Mark Schultz chronology
Mark Schultz (2000)	Song Cinema (2001)	Stories & Songs (2003)

Singles from Song Cinema
- 1. "I Have Been There" Released: 2001; 2. "Back in His Arms Again" Released: 2002; 3. "Think of Me (with Rachel Lampa)" Released: 2002

Song Cinema is the second album released by contemporary Christian music artist Mark Schultz. It was released on October 17, 2001.

== Track listing ==
All songs written by Mark Schultz, except where noted.

1. "When The Mountains Fall" (Schultz, Tony Wood) - 3:50
2. "Back In His Arms Again" - 4:24
3. "Think of Me" (with Rachel Lampa) - 4:47
4. "I Have Been There" (Schultz, Regie Hamm) - 4:05
5. "Kyrie Eleison" (Steve George, John Lang, Richard Page) - 3:42
6. "Holy One" (with Chris Rice) - 5:13
7. "Back To You" - 3:41
8. "Faith, Hope, and Love" - 4:36
9. "The Time of My Life" - 5:04
10. "We Are Calling You" - 5:31

== Personnel ==
- Mark Schultz – vocals, backing vocals
- Jeff Roach – keyboards
- Dan Muckala – programming (3)
- Gary Burnette – guitars
- George Cocchini – guitars
- Scott Denté – guitars
- Mark Hill – bass
- Dan Needham – drums
- Ken Lewis – percussion
- Sam Levine – saxophones (7)
- Barry Green – trombone (7)
- Mike Haynes – trumpet (7)
- David Angell – strings
- Monisa Angell – strings
- John Catchings – strings
- David Davidson – strings
- Lisa Bevill – backing vocals
- Tabitha Fair – backing vocals
- Bonnie Keen – backing vocals
- Rachel Lampa – vocals (3)
- Chris Rice – backing vocals (6)
- Nicol Sponberg – Congo language (10)
- Todd Smith – Congo language (10)

== Production ==
- Brad O’Donnell – executive producer
- Monroe Jones – producer
- Jim Dineen – recording, mixing (9)
- Shane D. Wilson – mixing (1, 2, 4–8, 10)
- Tom Laune – mixing (3)
- Doug Delong – assistant engineer
- Steve Short – assistant engineer
- Bob Ludwig – mastering at Gateway Mastering (Portland, Maine)
- Jamie Kiner – production coordinator
- Kevin Tucker – art direction, design
- Robert Sebree – photography
- Lisa Fanjoy – grooming
- Kerry Irvine – wardrobe styling
- John Murphy – wardrobe styling
- Creative Trust – management

== Charts ==
=== Singles ===
Year	Single	Peak chart positions				
Year	Single	US Christian Songs	US Christian AC	Christian AC Indicator	Soft Adult Contemporary/ Inspirational	Year End Christ
2001	"I Have Been There"	1	1	1	4	13
2002	"Back in His Arms Again"	1	1	1	1	7
2013	"Think of Me"	5	3	4	2	34
