= Broken & Beautiful (Mark Schultz album) =

Studio album by Mark Schultz
- Released: September 26, 2006
- Studios: Sound Stage Studios, The Lealand House, The Smoakstack, Mono Y Mono, Bingham Bend, Bletchley Park, Starstruck Studios, Jane's Place and The Rec Room (Nashville, Tennessee); Little Big Sound (Bellevue, Tennessee); The Castle (Franklin, Tennessee)
- Genres: CCM, pop
- Length: 43:41 (Standard release); 59:16 (Expanded edition)
- Label: Word Entertainment
- Producers: Shaun Shankel; Mark Bright

Mark Schultz chronology
| Live... A Night of Stories and Songs (2005) | Broken & Beautiful (2006) | Come Alive (2009) |

Singles from Broken & Beautiful
- 1. "Broken & Beautiful" Released: 2006; 2. "Walking Her Home" Released: 2007; 3. "Everything to Me" Released: 2007; 4. "40 Days" Released: 2008

Broken & Beautiful is the fifth album (fourth studio album) released by Contemporary Christian artist Mark Schultz. It was released on September 26, 2006.

== Track listing ==
All songs written by Mark Schultz, except where noted.

1. "40 Days" (Schultz, Ben Glover) - 3:42
2. "Broken & Beautiful" (Schultz, Matthew West) - 5:22
3. "Walking Her Home" - 4:11
4. "Until I See You Again" - 2:53
5. "1000 Miles" - 2:59
6. "Lord You Are" - 3:40
7. "Everything to Me" (Schultz, Cindy Morgan) - 4:36
8. "God of Life" (Schultz, Ian Eskelin) - 4:22
9. "Now That You've Come Into My Life" - 3:11
10. "She Was Watching" - 5:07
11. "Until I See You Again" (Ballad Version) - 3:38

== Personnel ==
- Mark Schultz – vocals, backing vocals
- Shaun Shankel – keyboards (1, 2, 5, 6, 8, 9), programming (1, 2, 5, 6, 8, 9), arrangements (1, 2, 5, 6, 8, 9)
- Matt Rollings – acoustic piano (2, 5, 8)
- Tim Akers – keyboards (3, 4, 7, 10)
- Jimmy Nichols – keyboards (3, 4, 7, 10)
- Gordon Mote – acoustic piano (11)
- Rob Hawkins – guitars (1, 2, 6, 8, 9)
- Paul Moak – guitars (1, 2, 6)
- Tom Bukovac – guitars (2–4, 7–10)
- Akil Thompson – bass (1, 6)
- Craig Young – bass (2, 8, 9)
- Jimmie Lee Sloas – bass (3, 4, 7, 10)
- Ben Phillips – drums (1, 6)
- Shannon Forrest – drums (2, 8, 9)
- Chris McHugh – drums (3, 4, 7, 10)
- Eric Darken – percussion (3, 4, 7, 10)
- Jonathan Yudkin – string arrangements (3, 4, 11), bass (3), cello (3, 11), viola (3, 11), violin (3, 11), strings (4), mandolin (11), arco bass (11)
- Ben Glover – backing vocals (2)
- Lisa Cochran – backing vocals (3, 4, 7, 10)
- Perry Coleman – backing vocals (3, 4, 7, 10)
- Joy Williams – backing vocals (8)

String section on "1,000 Miles"

- David Davidson – string arrangements
- David Angell, Kristen Cassell, David Davidson, Jim Grosjean, Anthony LaMarchina, Pamela Sixfin, Elizabeth Stewart, Mary Kathryn Vanosdale and Kristen Wilkinson – string players

== Production ==
- Tim Marshall – executive producer
- Shaun Shankel – producer (1, 2, 5, 6, 8, 9)
- Mark Bright – producer (3, 4, 7, 10, 11)
- Jamie Kiner – A&R
- Joseph Prielonzy – production coordinator (1, 2, 5, 6, 8, 9)
- Mike "Frog" Griffith – production coordinator (3, 4, 7, 10, 11)
- Katherine Petillo – creative director
- Bert Sumner for Ground Level Design (Franklin, Tennessee) – design
- Michael Gomez – photography
- Megan Thompson – hair stylist, make-up
- Lucid Artist Management – management

Technical credits

- Greg Calbi – mastering (1–10) at Sterling Sound (New York City, New York)
- Hank Williams – mastering (11) at MasterMix (Nashville, Tennessee)
- Randy LeRoy – compiling at Final Stage Mastering (Nashville, Tennessee)
- Lee Bridges – recording (1, 2, 5, 6, 8, 9), digital editing (1, 2, 5, 6, 8, 9)
- Daewoo Kim – recording (1, 2, 5, 6, 8, 9)
- Shaun Shankel – recording (1, 2, 5, 6, 8, 9), digital editing (1, 2, 5, 6, 8, 9)
- Bill Whittington – recording (1, 2, 5, 6, 8, 9), digital editing (1, 2, 5, 6, 8, 9)
- F. Reid Shippen – mixing (1, 2, 5, 6, 8, 9)
- Derek Bason – recording (3, 4, 7, 10, 11), mixing (3, 4, 7, 10)
- Ben Fowler – mixing (11)
- Steve Lotz – assistant engineer (1, 2, 5, 6, 8, 9)
- Chris Ashburn – assistant engineer (3, 4, 7, 10, 11)
- J.R. Rodriguez – additional recording (3, 4, 7, 10, 11)

== 2007 re-release ==
A second album called Broken and Beautiful: Expanded Edition was released on September 25, 2007. The album included all the songs on the new album, plus songs featured on WOW Hits. Also, the album contains a DVD with new music videos, and the origin of the song "Walking Her Home".

== Reception ==
Professional ratings
Review scores
| Source | Rating |
|---|---|
| Jesus Freak Hideout | 3.5/5 stars |

=== Commercial performance ===
The album has currently sold over 300,000 copies nationwide.

=== Charts ===
| Chart (2009) | Peak position |
|---|---|
| Billboard 200 | 79 |
| Top Christian Albums | 1 |

==== Singles charts ====
| Title | Chart positions |
| Title | U.S. Christ |
|---|---|
| "Broken & Beautiful" | 6 |

== Awards ==
In 2007, the album was nominated for a Dove Award for Pop/Contemporary Album of the Year at the 38th GMA Dove Awards.
