= Mark Schultz (album) =

Studio album by Mark Schultz
- Released: March 28, 2000
- Recorded: 1999
- Studios: Dark Horse Recording Studio (Franklin, Tennessee)
- Genres: CCM; pop; pop rock
- Length: 47:04
- Label: Word Entertainment
- Producer: Monroe Jones

Mark Schultz chronology
Mark Schultz (2000)	Song Cinema (2001)

Singles from Mark Schultz
- 1. ""He's My Son"" Released: 2000; 2. ""I Am the Way"" Released: 2001; 3. ""Let's Go"" Released: 2001; 4. ""Remember Me"" Released: 2001

Mark Schultz is the self-titled debut album released by Contemporary Christian music artist Mark Schultz. It was released on March 28, 2000.

== Track listing ==
All songs written by Mark Schultz.

1. "I Am the Way" – 3:58
2. "Let's Go" – 2:26
3. "He's My Son" – 5:40
4. "When You Come Home" – 4:57
5. "When You Give" – 4:34
6. "Fall in Love Again" – 4:03
7. "Cloud of Witnesses" – 4:39
8. "Learn to Let Go" – 4:32
9. "I Saw the Light" – 3:42
10. "Legend of McBride" – 4:29
11. "Remember Me" (with Ginny Owens) – 4:07

== Personnel ==
- Mark Schultz – lead vocals, backing vocals, acoustic piano
- Jeff Roach – keyboards, acoustic piano
- Gary Burnette – electric guitar
- George Cocchini – acoustic guitar, electric guitar
- Rivers Rutherford – acoustic guitar
- Mark Hill – bass
- Greg Herrington – drums
- Dan Needham – drums
- Mark Douthit – horns
- Mike Haynes – horns
- Lisa Cochran – backing vocals
- Tabitha Fair – backing vocals
- Kim Keyes – backing vocals
- Marilyn Martin – backing vocals
- Michael Mellett – backing vocals
- Peter Penrose – backing vocals
- Chris Rodriguez – backing vocals
- Ginny Owens – backing vocals (11)

== Production ==
- Dan Posthuma – executive producer
- Monroe Jones – producer
- Richie Biggs – recording
- Jim Dineen – recording
- Rob Evans – recording assistant
- Shane D. Wilson – mixing at Whistler's Music (Nashville, Tennessee)
- Scott Bilyeu – mix assistant
- Stephen Marcussen – mastering at Marcussen Mastering (Hollywood, California)
- Creative Trust – management

== Reception ==
Professional ratings
Review scores
Source	Rating
Allmusic	4/5 stars

=== Critical reception ===
Allmusic gave the album mixed reviews. "In a way, this is the contrast Michael W. Smith has built his career upon, but Schultz has a little more of a rock piano and gospel influence, and actually a more appealing voice. The most interesting production is "When You Give," which finds Schultz (who also plays keyboards) backed by a gospel choir that breaks into the R&B chestnut "Take Me To the River" and gives those lyrics a spiritual meaning. After this, more pedestrian tunes like "Fall in Love Again" are a bit of a letdown, but on their own, each of the songs here holds up and works on both personal and more universal levels. Schultz's songs cover a wide range of topics, from learning to see God from a blind man's perspective to the pain of letting go when a child finally grows up."

=== Commercial reception ===
Billboard reported on August 12, 2000, the album was number 22 on Billboard's Top Contemporary Christian chart.

== Charts ==
=== Singles ===
Year	Single	Peak chart positions				
Year	Single	US Christian Songs	US Christian AC	Christian AC Indicator	Soft Adult Contemporary/ Inspirational	Year End Christ
2000	"He's My Son"	1	1	1	3	3
2001	"I Am the Way"	1	1	1	1	17
2001	"Let's Go"	20	18	17	20	–
2001	"Remember Me"	1	1	1	1	20
