= All Things Possible =

Studio album by Mark Schultz
- Released: September 4, 2012
- Studios: Superphonic Studios (Nashville, Tennessee); Dark Horse Recording, M Haus and beBrilliant (Franklin, Tennessee); Beech Creek Studio (Brentwood, Tennessee)
- Genres: Adult contemporary music; Contemporary Christian music
- Length: 34:32
- Label: Columbia/Fair Trade Services
- Producers: Pete Kipley; Seth Mosley

Mark Schultz chronology
| Renaissance (2011) | All Things Possible (2012) | Hymms (2014) |

All Things Possible is the seventh studio album by contemporary Christian musician Mark Schultz. The album is the first with Columbia Records and Fair Trade Services. This album was released on September 4, 2012, and the producers were Pete Kipley and Seth Mosley.

== Background ==
=== Album ===
Mark Schultz told CCM Magazine's Caroline Lusk that the impetus around the album came from a sense "'I wanted my son to know before he showed up what it was like before him.'" In so doing, "'This album is not as heavy on the tears as the past albums, but have more of a younger, fresher feel.'" The way he went about it was different from in the past because he expressed "'Usually, you write a song, cross your fingers and hope that magic things happen,...Seth would pull out the guitar and lay down a track. You knew that day when you left. There's a freshness to it....'"

=== Songs ===
"All Things Possible"

Mark Schultz shared that this song came from his 2005 bike ride to raise money for the James Fund, and in that journey it was done with a sense of being that "'True religion is taking care of widows and orphans...On the days that I was riding my bike and wanted to quit, I would cut out pictures of the kids we were helping. I knew these kids are important to God and they were important to me. By day 62, we had done 16 concerts, ridden 3700 miles and raised a quarter million dollars." Schultz shared the song meant that he "'...hope[d] that people are reminded that God can take what little we give and multiply it into something great.'"

"One Day"

Schultz shared the meaning as being that he "'...hope[d] it encourages people that no matter what struggles we face in life, one day we will see Jesus and we will be free from those struggled forever.'"

"I Gave Up"

Schultz shared the song "'talks about how loving each other and Christ well are more important than the things we have.'"

== Critical reception ==
Professional ratings
Review scores
| Source | Rating |
|---|---|
| About.com | 4/5 stars |
| CCM Magazine | 3/5 stars |
| Christian Music Zine | (4.25/5) |
| Christianity Today | 3/5 stars |
| Cross Rhythms | 6/10 stars |
| Indie Vision Music | 3/5 stars |
| Jesus Freak Hideout | 3/5 stars |
| Louder Than the Music | 4/5 stars |
| New Release Tuesday | 4.5/5 stars |
| The Phantom Tollbooth | 4/5 stars |
| Worship Leader | 4/5 stars |

All Things Possible has garnered "generally favorable ratings" by the eleven reviews, so far. This album has got positive or favorable reviews from the following publications: About.com, Alpha Omega News, Christian Music Zine, Louder Than the Music, New Release Tuesday, The Phantom Tollbooth and the Worship Leader magazine. On the other hand, All Things Possible got mixed reviews from the following publications: CCM Magazine, Christianity Today, Cross Rhythms, Indie Vision Music and Jesus Freak Hideout. However, the album has not got any negative or unfavorable reviews from the critics to date.

The album got only one four-and-a-half-star-out-of-five rating from New Release Tuesday's Kevin Davis. Davis said that "this album has [him] singing along in praise to [his] God and Savior from start to finish." The album got one 4.25-out-of-five rating from Christian Music Zine. To this, Andre said that "All Things Possible is a joyful, infectious, and enjoyable musical and lyrical roller-coaster ride that showcases Mark at his peak, with guitar based rock tracks next to heartfelt emotional tear jerkers. Seth Mosley and Pete Kipley have crafted a competent and thought provoking vehicle where Mark can lead listeners into the human heart and the plans God has for us!" In addition, Andre wrote that "All Things Possible is one of his best albums. With these ten tracks encompassing many musical genres and with a freshness similar to how Michael W Smith reinvents himself with his rocky songs on the 2010 album Wonder; the Fair Trade Services debut is something to savour, and something to check out on iTunes as well. Well done Mark, this 3 year wait is well worth it."

All Things Possible got four-star-out-of-five ratings from the following publications: About.com, Louder Than the Music, The Phantom Tollbooth and Worship Leader magazine. About.com's Kim Jones said that "All Things Possible offers up possibilities by the mile and leaves listeners truly believing that with God, anything really is possible. There isn't any better message than that and when it's delivered with zero cheesiness and 110% sincerity, it's as good as it gets." Louder Than the Music's Jono Davies said that he "thoroughly enjoyed this album." Furthermore, Davies wrote that the album "left [him] with a smile on [his] face and a sense of peace in [his] soul." The Phantom Tollbooth's Michael Dalton said that "Mark Schultz has never sounded better. All Things Possible may be his finest hour as a singer/songwriter." Andrea Hunter of Worship Leader said that "Mark Schultz is a master at crafting lyrics, telling small stories with big implications, theologizing in every day language, laying down pristine vocals, and musically precise tracks. His latest release All Things Possible has all that, and then some: it’s pure pop/rock exuding a retro-feel in a modern wrapper, or possibly vice versa."

The album got four three-star-out-of-five ratings from the following publications: CCM Magazine, Christianity Today, Indie Vision Music and Jesus Freak Hideout. Andy Argyrakis of CCM Magazine said that "Mark Schultz once again demonstrates his consistency in writing touching, uplifting piano pop, backed by breezy though not overly imaginative arrangements on this seventh studio CD." Kristin Garrett of Christianity Today said that "All Things Possible, he continues carving out his place in the contemporary Christian world with piano and guitar-driven pop and smooth, albeit non-descript, vocals. Perhaps as an attempt to get creative with a tired genre, Schultz adds subtle structural changes and a conservative dash of funk with brass band and gospel influences". Cross Rhythms' Tony Cummings told that "some tracks sound a tad overproduced and there simply isn't any song here with the emotional power of his old hits like 'He's My Son' and 'Letters From War'." Indie Vision Music's Jonathan Andre said that "Mark Schultz has created an album that is one of his most musically diverse and lyrically poignant out of all his albums, reminding creation of the love of the Creator. With a mixture of rock, pop, worship and ballads, this album is certainly for the CCM/Adult Contemporary musical genre lovers, listeners who long for some great music to soak their souls into" Jesus Freak Hideout's Alex "Tincan" Caldwell said that "All Things Possible unfortunately suffers from the same over-production as much of Schultz's adult contemporary peers. Peeling back the layers of sound would let his songs breath a bit more and lend weight to his poignant and sincere lyrics and melodies."

The only graded review came from Alpha Omega News, and Ken Wiegman said that Mark Schultz is back "with some fresh new sounds." To this, Wiegman gave the album an (A) grade.

== Track listing ==
Tracklist
| No. | Title | Writer(s) | Producer | Length |
|---|---|---|---|---|
| 1. | "All Things Possible" | Seth Mosley, Mark Schultz and Tony Wood | Seth Mosley | 3:42 |
| 2. | "It Is Well" | Mosley and Schultz | Mosley | 3:13 |
| 3. | "One Day" | Mia Fieldes, Doug McKelvey, Mosley and Schultz | Mosley | 3:48 |
| 4. | "I Gave Up" | Fieldes, Mosley and Schultz | Mosley | 3:33 |
| 5. | "Love Walked In" | Fieldes, Mosley and Schultz | Mosley | 3:46 |
| 6. | "More to You Than This" | Fieldes and Schultz | Mosley | 3:30 |
| 7. | "Be Still" | Phillip LaRue, Mosley and Schultz | Mosley | 3:13 |
| 8. | "What Do You Give a King" | Paul Allen and Schultz | Pete Kipley | 3:21 |
| 9. | "Haven't Met You Yet" | Cindy Morgan, Don Poythress, Schultz and Wood | Kipley | 3:28 |
| 10. | "I Will Love You Still" | Kate Celauro and Schultz | Kipley | 2:59 |
| Total length: | | | | 34:32 |

== Personnel ==
- Mark Schultz – all vocals
- Tim Lauer – keyboards (1–6)
- Seth Mosley – keyboards (1–7), programming (1–7), guitars (1–7), strings (1–4, 6), vocals (2), bass (5)
- Tim Akers – acoustic piano (8)
- Pete Kipley – programming (8–10), guitars (8, 9), French horn (10)
- Gordon Mote – acoustic piano (9, 10), Hammond B3 organ (9)
- Tom Bukovac – guitars (8)
- Phil Snowden – bass (1–4, 6)
- Tony Lucido – bass (7–9)
- Ben Phillips – drums (1–4, 6)
- Steven Kadar – drums (5, 7)
- Jeremy Lutito – drums (8, 9)
- Keith Everette Smith – horns (1–4, 6)
- David Henry – strings (5)
- The Roy G. Biv Vibe – strings (10)
- David Davidson – string arrangements (10), concertmaster (10)
- Julia Ross – backing vocals (1–6)
- Ellie Holcomb – backing vocals (9)

== Production ==
- James Rueger – A&R
- Dana Salsedo – creative director, stylist
- Jason Parish – design
- Allen Clark – photography
- Tasia Treimer – grooming
- Lucid Artist Management – management

Technical credits

- Dave McNair – mastering at Dave McNair Mastering (Winston-Salem, North Carolina)
- F. Reid Shippen – mixing
- Erik "Keller" Jahner – mix assistant
- Dave Hagan – engineer (1–7), editing (1–7)
- Seth Mosley – engineer (1–7), editing (1–7)
- Ben Phillips – engineer (1–7), editing (1–7)
- Micah Kuiper – additional editing (1–7)
- Michael "X" O'Connor – recording (8–10)
- Nathan Zwald – recording (8–10)

== Charts ==
=== Album ===
| Chart (2012) | Peak position |
|---|---|
| US Top Christian Albums (Billboard) | 33 |

=== Singles ===
| Year | Single | Peak chart positions | | | | |
| Year | Single | US Christian Songs | US Christian AC | Christian AC Indicator | Soft Adult Contemporary/ Inspirational | Year End Christ |
|---|---|---|---|---|---|---|
| 2012 | "All Things Possible" | 9 | 11 | 9 | 1 | 41 |
| 2013 | "One Day" | 38 | - | 40 | 1 | - |
| 2013 | "I Gave Up" | 41 | - | 32 | 5 | - |
