= I've Got the Joy Joy Joy Joy =

1925 Christian song

"Joy in My Heart", sometimes titled "I've Got the Joy, Joy, Joy, Joy" or "Joy, Joy Down in My Heart", is a popular Christian song often sung around the campfire and during scouting events. It is often included in Gospel music and a cappella concerts, songbooks, and Christian children's songbooks.

== History and author ==
The song was written by George William Cooke, born 1884 in Doncaster, Yorkshire, England. As a young man, Cooke twice circled the globe in evangelistic tours with Commissioner Samuel L. Brengle of the Salvation Army. He became a pastor in various locations across the East Coast of the United States. In 1925, he copyrighted "Joy in my Heart" as a minister in Wilmington, Delaware (copyright was not renewed). At the time, he was involved with a Methodist Church-associated group called Gospel Crusaders, and operated a site for gospel meetings and revivals called Delmarva Camp.

At a revival service Cooke held in 1928 in Pennsylvania, he pretended to "auction off" nearly 100 children to the crowded congregation, hawking them to potential buyers as slaves. Meanwhile the children loudly sang I've got the joy, joy, joy, joy, down in my heart, as Cooke had instructed them to do until his wife appeared as a Jesus figure, wearing robes and carrying a large red cross, to make the highest bid and "buy" the children's freedom. Cooke was the minister of Methodist churches in Buffalo and Rochester, before his 1951 death in Jamestown, New York

== In popular culture ==
The song is the origin of the title of William Stafford's 1947 prose memoir of his WWII pacifist service, Down In My Heart.
