= Letters from War =

"Letters From War"

Single by Mark Schultz

from the album Stories & Songs
- Released: 2003
- Genre: Pop, CCM
- Length: 4:15
- Label: Word Records
- Songwriter(s): Mark Schultz and Cindy Morgan
- Producer(s): Marc Dobiecki

Mark Schultz singles chronology
"He Will Carry Me" (2003)	"Letters From War" (2003)	"I Am" (2006)

"Letters From War" is a single by singer/songwriter Mark Schultz on his third album Stories & Songs. Inspired by Schultz' family, this Contemporary Christian / Pop song released in 2003 along with its music video and has won several awards and appeared on WOW Hits 2005.

== Background ==
Mark Schultz stated that the song was written in honor of his Great-Grandmother's sons. All 3 of the boys went to fight in World War II. Her 2 older boys came home a short time later but her youngest son was there until the end of the war.

The song itself tells of a young man going off to fight in a war. His mother writes daily, and he writes back. One day in December, she gets a letter from a fellow soldier that her son was captured by the enemy while saving him. The mother keeps writing anyway, and two years later, a black car pulls into her driveway, and she faints. Her son steps out, now a Captain. He runs to her, and tells her he's followed her orders of coming home. He has all of her letters in his hand while he's hugging her, and the video ends with the other soldiers being reunited with their families.

== Music video ==
A music video for the song was filmed in rural Georgia in 2004. The video features Blake Michael (host of Cartoon Network's Fried Dynamite) at age 7 portraying the soldier as a young boy.

The video was directed by Marc Dobiecki.

The video also won The 2003-2004 Department of Defense Visual Information Production Award for the U.S. Army Combat Readiness Center (CRC).

== Reception ==
The song was the #1 song on American Armed Forces Radio in 2004 and was performed for George W. Bush during the summer of the same year.

== Awards ==
In 2005, the song was nominated for a Dove Award for Pop/Contemporary Recorded Song of the Year at the 36th GMA Dove Awards.

== Personnel ==
- Songwriting - Mark Schultz, Cindy Morgan
- Director - Mark Dobiecki
- Vocals - Mark Schultz
