= Love Has Come =

Single by Mark Schultz

from the album Come Alive
- Released: May 1, 2010
- Genre: Gospel
- Length: 5:20
- Label: Word Records
- Songwriters: Mark Schultz, Brown Bannister, Matthew West
- Producer: Brown Bannister

Mark Schultz singles chronology
| "He Is" (2009) | "Love Has Come" (2010) | ""n/a"" |

"Love Has Come" is singer-songwriter Mark Schultz's third single for his fifth studio album Come Alive. The song was featured on the compilations WOW Hits 2011 and WOW Hits 2012.

== Background ==
Mark says he used Bible passages to write the song. One passage in particular was Philippians 2:5–11. He also used Isaiah 45:22–24.

== Production ==
Mark said that he wrote two bridges with no verses:

Every knee shall bow, Every tongue confess, That God is love, And love has come for us all.

Glory, glory, hallelujah, Thank You for the cross, Singing glory, glory, hallelujah, Christ has paid the cost.

Producer Brown Bannister helped write the verses and an extra bridge:

Oh, and on that day, We will stand amazed, At our Savior, God and King, Just to see the face, Of amazing grace, As our hearts rise up and sing.

== Music video ==
The music video features Mark singing with a gospel choir. The video was released on March 22.

== Critical reception ==
NRT Contributor Kevin Davis called the single "a great song to sing and praise to."

The music video was recently voted #4 of 10 during the 4th Annual GMC Music Video Awards.

== Chart performance ==
The song debuted at No. 13 on the Billboard Hot Christian Songs chart in its first week of release, and has since peaked at No. 11.

=== Charts ===
| Peak position | Chart |
|---|---|
| U.S. Billboard Hot Christian Songs | 11 |

== Personnel ==
- Songwriting – Brown Bannister, Matthew West, Mark Schultz
- Record producer – Brown Bannister
- Vocals – Mark Schultz

== Release history ==
| Region | Date | Format |
|---|---|---|
| United States | August 25, 2009 | Album release |
| United States | May 1, 2010 | Digital download |
