= I Am (Mark Schultz song) =

Single by Mark Schultz

from the album Live: A Night of Stories & Songs
- Released: 2005
- Genre: CCM
- Length: 3:58 (album version); 4:16 (live version)
- Label: Word
- Songwriter(s): Mark Schultz

Mark Schultz singles chronology
"Letters From War" (2003)	"I Am" (2005)	"Broken & Beautiful" (2006)

"I Am" is a single by singer/songwriter Mark Schultz. It is also Schultz's first single not to be on one of his studio albums, appearing on his live album, Live: A Night of Stories & Songs.

This song was also appears of the WOW Hits 2007 compilation album.

== Background ==
This song was introduced during Schultz's live show, A Night of Stories & Songs. He states that he felt God in the room when he wrote the song. He also performed the song on the CD/DVD Broken & Beautiful: Expanded Edition in a live segment.

== Charts ==
The song has gained success throughout the years. It peaked at #3 on the Hot Christian Songs chart.

=== Chart positions ===
Peak position	Chart
U.S. Hot Christian Songs	3
