= Come Alive (Mark Schultz album) =

Studio album by Mark Schultz
- Released: August 25, 2009
- Genres: CCM, pop, pop rock
- Length: 42:06
- Label: Word
- Producers: Brown Bannister; Shaun Shankel; Bernie Herms; Paul Mills

Mark Schultz chronology
Broken & Beautiful (2006)	Come Alive (2009)

Singles from Come Alive
- 1. "He Is" Released: August 25, 2009; 2. "Love Has Come" Released: May 1, 2010; 3. "What It Means To Be Loved" Released: January 1, 2011

Come Alive is an album by Contemporary Christian music singer/songwriter Mark Schultz, released on August 25, 2009.

== Background ==
Schultz got the idea for the album's second single, "He Is," from his wife. Before the release of the album, Schultz toured with Point of Grace in a nationwide Come Alive Tour.

== Track listing ==
Album release
No.	Title	Writer(s)	Length
1.	"All Has Been Forgiven"	Mark Schultz, Matthew West	3:39
2.	"Grace Amazing"	Barry Graul, Bart Millard, Schultz	4:05
3.	"He Is"	Brown Bannister, Schultz	3:57
4.	"What It Means to Be Loved"	Schultz	4:14
5.	"God of Glory"	Don Poythress, Schultz	4:27
6.	"Closer Than I’ve Ever Been"	Bernie Herms, Schultz	4:19
7.	"Come Alive"	Schultz, West	3:53
8.	"Live Like You’re Loved"	Schultz	4:28
9.	"Father’s Eyes"	Schultz, Joy Williams	3:46
10.	"Love Has Come"	Bannister, Sam Mizell, Schultz, West	5:20
Total length:			42:08

== Personnel ==
Musicians

- Mark Schultz – lead vocals, backing vocals (3, 9)
- Blair Masters – keyboards (1, 9, 10), acoustic piano (3, 9, 10), programming (3), Hammond B3 organ (10)
- Matt Stanfield – keyboards (1), programming (1)
- Shaun Shankel – keyboards (2, 5, 8), bass (8)
- Bernie Herms – acoustic piano (4, 6, 7), keyboards (6, 7)
- Tom Bukovac – electric guitar (1, 3, 10), guitars (4), acoustic guitar (10)
- Jerry McPherson – electric guitar (1, 3, 10), guitars (9)
- Scott Denté – acoustic guitar (1)
- Nick De Partee – guitars (2)
- Paul Moak – guitars (2, 5, 8)
- Pete Stewart – guitars (2, 5, 8)
- Mike Payne – electric guitar (3)
- Kenny Greenberg – guitars (4)
- Trevor Morgan – acoustic guitar (4, 6, 7)
- Luke Buishas – guitars (5, 8)
- Neil DeGrade – guitars (6, 7)
- Adam Lester – guitars (6, 7)
- Tony Lucido – bass (1–5, 10)
- Joey Canaday – bass (6, 7, 9)
- Dan Needham – drums (1, 3, 6, 7, 9, 10), percussion (9)
- Will Sayles – drums (2, 5)
- Jerry Roe – drums (4)
- Ben Phillips – drums (8)
- Brown Bannister – percussion (1, 3, 10), programming (1)
- F. Reid Shippen – percussion (1, 3, 10)
- Luke Brown – backing vocals (1, 3, 10)
- Missi Hale – backing vocals (1, 3)
- Thom Flora – backing vocals (4)
- Calvin Nowell – backing vocals (10), BGV arrangements (10)
- Nickie Conley – backing vocals (10)
- Debi Selby – backing vocals (10)

Choir on "Love Has Come"

- Chance Scoggins – choir director
- Drew Cline, Nickie Conley, Leanne Palmore, Christy Richardson, Chance Scoggins, Debi Selby, Terry White, Jerard Woods and Jovaun Woods – choir singers

String sections (Tracks 4–9)

- Bernie Herms – string arrangements (4, 6, 7)
- Shaun Shankel – string arrangements (5, 8)
- David Angell – strings (4–9)
- Monisa Angell – strings (4, 6, 7, 9)
- John Catchings – strings (4–9)
- Seanad Chang – strings (4, 6, 7)
- David Davidson – strings (4–9), string contractor (4–9)
- Sarighani Reist – strings (4, 6, 7)
- Pamela Sixfin – strings (4–7)
- Karen Winkleman – strings (4, 6, 7)
- Conni Ellisor – strings (5, 8)
- Jim Grosjean – strings (5, 8)
- Anthony LaMarchina – strings (5, 8)
- Mary Kathryn Vanosdale – strings (5, 8)
- Kristin Wilkinson – strings (5, 8)

== Production ==
- Jamie Kiner – A&R
- Brown Bannister – producer (1, 3, 10)
- Shaun Shankel – producer (2, 5, 8)
- Bernie Herms – producer (4, 6, 7)
- Paul Mills – producer (9)
- Bill Whittington – recording
- F. Reid Shippen – mixing (1–3, 5, 8–10)
- Justin Niebank – mixing (4)
- Craig Alvin – mixing (6, 7)
- Drew Bollman – mix assistant (4)
- Jeff Pillar – mix assistant (6, 7)
- Andrew Mendelson – mastering at Georgetown Masters (Nashville, Tennessee)
- Shelly Anderson – mastering assistant
- Nathaphol Abhidgantaphand – mastering assistant
- Daniel Bacigalupi – mastering assistant
- Katherine Petillo – creative director
- Jay Smith and the Majestics – design
- David Bean – photography
- Josh Hailey – photography
- Amber Lehman – stylist

== Reception ==
Professional ratings
Review scores
Source	Rating
Allmusic	2.5/5 stars
Starpulse.com	2/5 stars
Jesus Freak Hideout	3.5/5 stars

This album received positive reviews by Allmusic. "A youth minister who left behind aspirations for stardom in Nashville, singer/songwriter Mark Schultz has ultimately pursued his dream, drawing crowds and building a following through work with his local congregation."

== Awards ==
In 2010, the album was nominated for a Dove Award for Pop/Contemporary Album of the Year at the 41st GMA Dove Awards.

== Charts ==
Chart (2009)	Peak position
US Billboard 200	62
US Billboard Top Christian Albums	1

=== Singles ===
Peak
Peak	U.S. Christ	Year End Christ
"He Is"	5	17
"Love Has Come"	9	19

"-" denotes the single did not chart.
