= Mark Schultz (musician) =

American musician

- Born: Mark Mitchell Schultz; September 16, 1970 (age 55)
- Origin: Colby, Kansas U.S.
- Genres: CCM
- Occupations: Singer, songwriter
- Instruments: Piano, acoustic guitar
- Years active: 2000–present
- Labels: Word, Curb, Fair Trade Services
- Website: www.markschultzmusic.com

Mark Mitchell Schultz (born September 16, 1970) is an American contemporary Christian music artist. He has been nominated for numerous Dove Awards, winning his first at the 2006 Dove Awards when the CD/DVD Mark Schultz Live: A Night of Stories & Songs was named Long Form Music Video of the Year.

== Discography ==
- Mark Schultz (2000)
- Song Cinema (2001)
- Stories & Songs (2003)
- Live: A Night of Stories and Songs (2005)
- Broken & Beautiful (2006)
- Come Alive (2009)
- Renaissance (2011)
- All Things Possible (2012)
- Hymns (2014)
- Before You Call Me Home - EP (2015)
- Follow (Live) (2018)
- Christmas (2018)
- Hymns From Home (2026)

== Bibliography ==
- Mark Schultz; J.L. Bibb (2005). Stories Behind the Songs. ISBN 9781933876009.
- Mark Schultz; Travis Thrasher (2011). Letters from War.

== Awards and nominations ==
Year	Award	Category	Result
2005	Dove Awards	Long Form Music Video of the Year	Won
2010	Dove Awards	Male Artist of the Year	Nominated
2010	Dove Awards	Pop/Contemporary Album of the Year	Nominated
