= Word Entertainment =

US record company

- Parent company: Curb Records
- Founded: 1951
- Founder: Jarrell McCracken
- Distributors: Word Distribution, Warner Music Group
- Genre: Gospel, Christian
- Country of origin: U.S.
- Location: Nashville, Tennessee
- Official website: wordentertainment.com

Word Entertainment is a Christian faith-based entertainment company based in Nashville, Tennessee. It is owned by Curb Records. Word Entertainment represents Francesca Battistelli, for King & Country, Switchfoot, Skillet, Sidewalk Prophets, Chris August, Big Daddy Weave, in addition to many others, and is home to Word Distribution, 25 Live, Word Music Publishing and Word Label Group's Word Records and Fervent Records.

== History ==
Word Records was founded in Waco, Texas, in 1951 by Jarrell McCracken, Baylor business major Henry SoRelle and radio and television executive Ted Snider. The label's name is based on a 16-minute spoken word recording written and narrated by McCracken, the first recording released by the label, entitled "The Game of Life". The 23-year-old KWTX sportscaster in Waco had read an article by Jimmy Allen, a former athlete who became a Baptist preacher, and based his recording on the article which also is called "The Game of Life". The event is based on a full length match between the forces of Good and Evil with Jesus Christ and Satan coaching the two teams.

Subsequent records focused on other spoken word recordings, but Word soon branched out into southern gospel music. Early employees for the label included Tom Norfleet, Kurt Kaiser and Ralph Carmichael.

The label struggled initially until Marvin Norcross became an equity partner. By 1954, Word had become a publishing house as well.

Several subsidiary labels were started over the years: Canaan Records in the sixties, Myrrh Records (1972) and DaySpring Records in 1977, and Rejoice Records in the eighties. Two of these labels no longer exist today in their original form. The Myrrh Label was resurrected in 2005 as a praise and worship record label: Myrrh Worship.

Larry Norman's Solid Rock Records had a distribution deal with Word from 1975 to 1980. Artists on Solid Rock included Norman, Randy Stonehill, Daniel Amos, Tom Howard and Mark Heard.

Light Records was distributed in the 1970s by Word Records before being sold to Ralph Carmichael in the 1980s.

Reunion Records signed a distribution and promotion contract in the 80s, the agreement lasted well into the 1990s. Today, Reunion Records is distributed through Provident Music Group.

Star Song was distributed by Word Records but left their distribution deal in the late 1980s to sign with Sparrow Records which was taken over by Chordant Distribution and then by EMI.

Distribution deals with other labels in the 1970s, 1980s, and early 1990s allowed Word Records to rise, representing Amy Grant, Michael W. Smith, Rich Mullins, Russ and Tori Taff, Paul Smith, The Imperials, Petra, Sandi Patti, Kenny Marks, Wayne Watson, Carman, The Archers featuring Steve Archer, White Heart, Gaither Vocal Band, Bill Gaither Trio, Point of Grace, Love Song, Sweet Comfort Band, The Nelons, Happy Goodman Family featuring Rusty Goodman, Florida Boys, Guardian and other artists.

In the 1976, McCracken sold part interest in his label to the American Broadcasting Company. 10 years later, ABC merged with Capital Cities, Inc. and forced McCracken out of the company.

In 1983, Chris Christian signed a distribution deal to move his label Home Sweet Home Records from Benson Records to Word Records, today it is still active and remains under the independent ownership of Chris Christian.

From 1984 to 1990, Word was distributed in the general market by A&M Records and then by Epic Records until 2002.

In 1992, Capital Cities ABC sold Word to Thomas Nelson, Inc. for $72 Million, and Nelson made two major changes—developing the present swirling W logo for book products which was unveiled in 1995, and also moving its headquarters from Waco, Texas, to its present headquarters in Nashville. Nelson split the record label and book publishing arms in 1996 when the labels were sold to Gaylord Entertainment. In an agreement with Gaylord, Thomas Nelson continued to use the "Word Publishing" name for its book imprint until 2002, at which time it became "W Publishing Group" and retained the swirling W logo. A highly controversial ad campaign introduced at the CBA convention in 2002 created litigation, settled later.

After Colin Reed took over Gaylord Entertainment in 2001, the hotelier made corporate changes at the company, including the ousting of longstanding president Roland Lundy, and sold off the Word Entertainment group to then-AOL Time Warner in 2002. In 2002, former Atlantic Records Christian division manager Barry Landis briefly took the position of president of the label group division. Word went through a period of restructuring, closing their Los Angeles music publishing office, absorbing Myrrh Records, Squint Entertainment, and Everland Entertainment into the Word Label Group, and reducing in-house staff. Curb Records also gained a stake in the company during this time. In 2004, the company was sold again as part of Time Warner divestiture of its music division, selling it to a group of investors led by Edgar Bronfman to form a newly independent Warner Music Group. Canaan Records was re-opened in early 2007 with Dave Clark at the helm. Canaan Records was eventually shuttered.

In March 2016, it was announced that Mike Curb acquired 100 percent of Word Entertainment (excluding the print music division, which was eventually sold to The Lorenz Corporation) from Warner Music Group. WMG has continued to distribute Word's output for the general market. Also in 2016, it was announced that Joseph Prielozny, the former Reach Records producer, would be in charge of the hip-hop imprint which is to be called 4 Against 5. They announced the name of the imprint when they signed Steven Malcolm to their roster.

== Notable artists ==
=== Current ===
- About a Mile
- Meredith Andrews
- Francesca Battistelli
- Big Daddy Weave
- Jason Castro
- Dara Maclean
- For King & Country
- Love & the Outcome
- Needtobreathe
- Sidewalk Prophets
- Skillet
- Switchfoot

=== Former ===
- 4Him
- Across the Sky
- Steve Archer
- Carolyn Arends
- Wendy Bagwell and the Sunliters
- Charles Billingsley
- Kim Boyce
- Anita Bryant
- Shirley Caesar
- Steve Camp
- Glen Campbell
- Bruce Carroll
- Ashley Cleveland
- Billy Ray Cyrus
- Building 429
- Cynthia Clawson
- Clay Crosse
- Dakoda Motor Co.
- Downhere
- O'Landa Draper
- Bryan Duncan
- Evie
- Gaither Vocal Band
- Terri Gibbs
- John Gimenez
- Happy Goodman Family
- Howard & Vestal Goodman
- Rusty Goodman
- Amy Grant
- Bruce Greer
- Guardian
- Mark Heard
- Benny Hester
- Nancy Honeytree
- Ideola
- Wes King
- Tonio K
- Rachael Lampa
- Love Song
- Mark Lowry
- Kenny Marks
- Babbie Mason
- David Meece
- Rich Mullins
- Mylon & Broken Heart
- Michael Omartian
- Leon Patillo
- Sandi Patty
- Petra
- David Phelps
- Leslie Phillips
- pureNRG
- Salvador
- Mark Schultz
- George Beverly Shea
- Sixpence None the Richer
- Chris Sligh
- Michael W. Smith
- Paul Smith
- Stellar Kart
- Russ Taff
- Steve Taylor
- The Archers
- The Cathedrals
- The Florida Boys
- Dallas Holm
- The Hoppers
- The Imperials
- The Inspirations Quartet
- The Kingsmen
- The Lefevres
- The Lewis Family
- The Nelons
- BJ Thomas
- Jaci Velasquez
- Greg X Volz
- Mike Warnke
- Sheila Walsh
- Wayne Watson
- Daniel Winans
- Point of Grace

== See also ==
- List of Christian record labels
