= For King & Country discography =

for King and Country discography
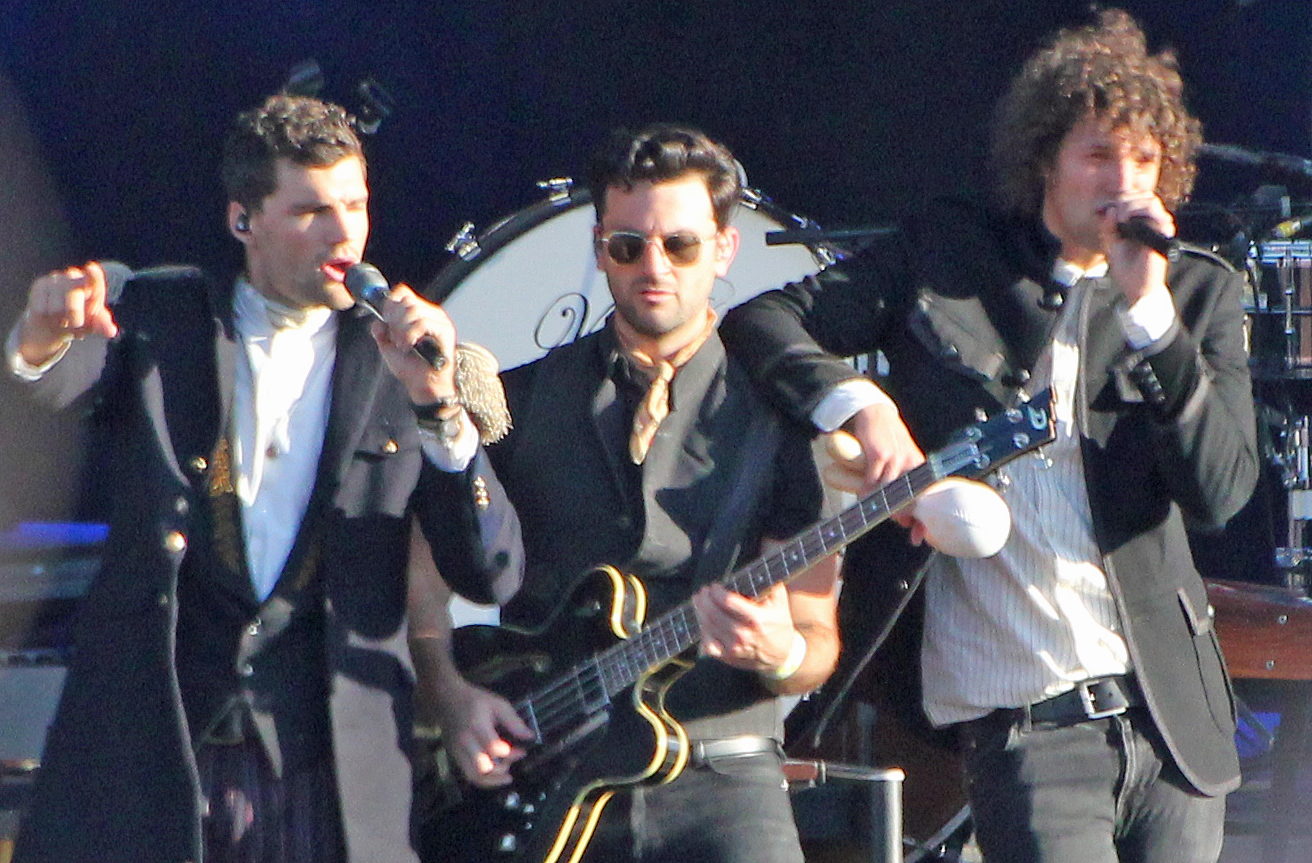
- For King & Country performing in 2018
- Studio albums: 6
- EPs: 4
- Live albums: 3
- Singles: 24

This is the discography of contemporary Christian band For King & Country.

== Albums ==
=== Studio albums ===
Title	Album details	Peak chart positions									Certifications
Title	Album details	AUS	BEL	CAN	NLD	SWI	UK Down	UK C&G	US	US Christ.	Certifications
Crave	Release date: 28 February 2012; Label: Warner Music Group, Fervent; Format: CD, digital download	—	—	—	—	—	—	—	128	4	
Run Wild. Live Free. Love Strong.	Release date: 16 September 2014; Label: Warner Music Group, Fervent; Format: CD, digital download	—	—	—	—	—	—	8	13	2	RIAA: Gold
Burn the Ships	Release date: 5 October 2018; Label: Curb, Word; Format: CD, LP, digital download	77	146	41	69	57	49	3	7	1	RIAA: Platinum
A Drummer Boy Christmas	Released: 30 October 2020; Label: Word; Format: CD, digital download, streaming	—	—	—	—	—	—	—	50	1	
What Are We Waiting For?	Released: 11 March 2022; Label: Curb, Word; Format: CD, LP, digital download, streaming	62	—	—	—	81	43	4	7	1	
The Most Beautiful Colours	Released: 18 September 2026; Label: Curb; Format: CD, LP, digital download, streaming	— (Note: The Most Beautiful Colours did not enter the ARIA Top 50 Albums chart, but peaked at number 13 on the ARIA Top 20 Australian Albums chart.)	—	—	—	—	70	—	— (Note: The Most Beautiful Colours did not enter the Billboard 200, but peaked at number 22 on the Billboard Top Album Sales.)	4	
"—" denotes releases that did not chart or was not released in that territory.

=== Live albums ===
Title	Album details	Peak chart positions		
Title	Album details	US	US Christ.	US Holiday
Hope Is What We Crave: Live	Released: 27 August 2013; Label: Word; Format: CD, digital download	—	—	—
Christmas: Live from Phoenix	Released: 27 October 2017; Label: Word; Format: CD, digital download	184	5	15
A Drummer Boy Christmas (LIVE)	Released: 22 November 2024; Label: Curb; Format: CD, digital download	—	—	—
"—" denotes releases that did not chart or was not released in that territory.

=== Soundtracks ===
Title	Album details	Peak chart positions		
Title	Album details	US Top	US Christ.	US Sound.
Priceless	Released: 17 February 2017; Label: Fervent Records; Format: digital download	—	—	—
Unsung Hero	Released: 26 April 2024; Label: Curb; Format: digital download	29	3	7
Drummer Boy	Released: 6 November 2026; Label: Curb; Format: digital download	—	11	—
"—" denotes releases that did not chart or was not released in that territory.

== EPs ==
Title	EP details	Peak chart positions
Title	EP details	US Christ.
A Tale of Two Towns: The EP	Released: 2008; Label: Independent; Formats: CD	—
For King & Country: The EP	Released: 20 September 2011; Label: Warner; Formats: CD	—
Into the Silent Night: The EP	Released: 18 November 2016; Label: Curb/Word; Formats: CD, LP, digital download, streaming	5
The Live Room Sessions at RCA Studio A	Released: 23 October 2015; Label: Curb/Word; Formats: Digital download, streaming	—
"—" denotes releases that did not chart or was not released in that territory.

== Singles ==
=== As lead artist ===
Title	Year	Peak chart positions							Certifications	Album
Title	Year	NZ Hot	US	US Christ.	US Christ Air	US Christ AC	US AC	US Adult Pop	Certifications	Album
"People Change" (As Joel & Luke)	2010	—	—	—		—	—	—		For King & Country: The EP
"Busted Heart (Hold On to Me)"	2011	—	—	3		5	—	—		Crave
"The Proof of Your Love"	2012	—	—	8		7	—	—	RIAA: Platinum	Crave
"Baby Boy"	2012	—	—	17		6	—	—		Into the Silent Night: The EP
"Middle of Your Heart"	2013	—	—	16		15	—	—		Crave
"Hope Is What We Crave" (Note: "Hope Is What We Crave" is a re-worked version of "Crave" from the album Crave.)	2013	—	—	21		24	—	—		Crave
"Fix My Eyes"	2014	—	—	3	1	3	—	38	RIAA: Platinum	Run Wild. Live Free. Love Strong.
"Shoulders"	2015	—	—	4	1	1	—	—	RIAA: Gold	Run Wild. Live Free. Love Strong.
"It's Not Over Yet (The Encore)"	2016	—	—	5	2	7	—	—		Run Wild. Live Free. Love Strong. (Deluxe Anniversary Edition)
"Priceless"	2016	—	—	3	1	1	—	—	RIAA: Gold	Run Wild. Live Free. Love Strong. (Deluxe Anniversary Edition)
"Glorious"	2016	—	—	8	6	2	—	—		Into the Silent Night: The EP (Extended Edition)
"O God Forgive Us" (featuring KB)	2017	—	—	14	11	13	—	—		Run Wild. Live Free. Love Strong. (Deluxe Anniversary Edition)
"Little Drummer Boy (Live From Phoenix)"	2017	—	—	4	17	4	27	—		Christmas: Live from Phoenix
"Joy"	2018	—	— (Note: "Joy" did not enter the Billboard Hot 100, but peaked at No. 14 on the Bubbling Under Hot 100.)	2	1	1	28	26	RIAA: Platinum	Burn the Ships
"Little Drummer Boy (Rewrapped)"	2018	—	—	45	20	5	—	—		Non-album single
"God Only Knows"	2019	—	94	2	1	1	17	21	RIAA: 2× Platinum	Burn the Ships
"Burn the Ships"	2019	—	— (Note: "Burn the Ships" did not enter the Billboard Hot 100, but peaked at No. 20 on the Bubbling Under Hot 100.)	3	1	1	—	—	RIAA: Platinum	Burn the Ships
"God Only Knows" (with Dolly Parton)	2019	—	—	—	41	—	—	—		Burn the Ships (Deluxe Edition: Remixes & Collaborations)
"Together" (with Tori Kelly and Kirk Franklin)	2020	29	— (Note: "Together" did not enter the Billboard Hot 100, but peaked at No. 20 on the Bubbling Under Hot 100.)	2	1	1	15	23	RIAA: Gold	Burn the Ships (Deluxe Edition: Remixes & Collaborations)
"Little Drummer Boy (2020)"	2020	—	—	6	—	—	14	—		A Drummer Boy Christmas
"O Come O Come Emmanuel" (feat. Needtobreathe)	2020	—	—	9	1	1	—	—		A Drummer Boy Christmas
"Do You Hear What I Hear?"	2020	—	—	4	—	—	8	—	RIAA: Gold	Non-album single
"Amen"	2021	—	—	5	1	1	13	—	RIAA: Gold	Burn the Ships
"Amen (Reborn)" (with Lecrae and The World Famous Tony Williams)	2021	—	—	—	—	—	—	—		Burn the Ships (Deluxe Edition: Remixes & Collaborations)
"Relate"	2021	—	— (Note: "Relate" did not enter the Billboard Hot 100, but peaked at No. 6 on the Bubbling Under Hot 100.)	1	1	1	17	32		What Are We Waiting For?
"For God Is with Us"	2021	23	—	1	1	1	—	—		What Are We Waiting For?
"Heavenly Hosts"	2021	—	—	16	2	2	—	—		A Drummer Boy Christmas
"Love Me Like I Am" (original or with Jordin Sparks)	2022	—	—	2	1	1	9	26		What Are We Waiting For?
"What Are We Waiting For?"	2023	—	—	5	1	5	—	27		What Are We Waiting For +
"Place in This World" (with Michael W. Smith)	2024	—	—	11	—	17	11	—		Unsung Hero
"Silent Night (Rewrapped)"	2024	—	—	6	—	—	14	—		Non-album single
"World on Fire" (featuring Taylor Hill)	2025	— (Note: "World on Fire" did not enter the Recorded Music NZ Hot Singles chart, but peaked at number 29 on the RadioScope NZ Airplay chart.)	— (Note: "World on Fire" did not enter the Billboard Hot 100, but peaked at number 17 on the Billboard Digital Song Sales.)	12	2	3	—	19		The Most Beautiful Colours
"Ever & Ever Before" (featuring Mōria and Courtney Smallbone)	2026	—	—	—	—	—	—	—		The Most Beautiful Colours
"What If I Told You?"	2026	—	—	11	11	7	—	—		The Most Beautiful Colours
"—" denotes releases that did not chart or was not released in that territory.

=== As featuring artist ===
Title	Year	Peak chart positions				Album
Title	Year	US Christ.	US Christ. Airplay	US Christ. AC	US Pop	Album
"Caught Dreaming" (Andy Mineo featuring For King & Country)	2013	—	—	—	—	Heroes for Sale
"Messengers" (Lecrae featuring For King & Country)	2014	20	22	23	—	Anomaly
"Kingdom Come" (Rebecca St. James featuring For King & Country)	2021	34	26	20	—	Kingdom Come
"I Still Believe" (Lecrae featuring For King & Country)	2024	26	—	—	—	I Still Believe
"Yes" (Steven Malcolm featuring KB and For King & Country)	2025	—	—	—	33	Non-album single
"—" denotes releases that did not chart.

== Promotional singles ==
Title	Year	Peak chart positions			Album
Title	Year	NZ Air.	US Christ.	US AC	Album
"Pioneers" (featuring Moriah & Courtney)	2018	—	27	—	Burn the Ships
"Joy to the World (2020)"	2020	—	36	—	A Drummer Boy Christmas
"Unsung Hero"	2022	—	12	11	What Are We Waiting For?
"Miracle"	2026	—	38	—	The Most Beautiful Colours
"Alle"	2026	22	47	—	The Most Beautiful Colours

== Other charted songs ==
Title	Year	Peak chart positions			Album
Title	Year	US Christ.	US Christ. Airplay	US AC	Album
"Angels We Have Heard on High"	2014	20	10	—	Into the Silent Night: The EP
"Without You" (featuring Courtney)	2014	27	—	—	Run Wild. Live Free. Love Strong.
"Run Wild" (featuring Andy Mineo)	2015	37	—	—	Run Wild. Live Free. Love Strong.
"Fight On, Fighter"	2018	29	—	—	Burn the Ships
"Go Tell It on the Mountain" (featuring Gabby Barrett)	2020	2	—	12	A Drummer Boy Christmas
"Broken Halos"	2022	37	—	—	What Are We Waiting For?
"The Most Beautiful Colours"	2026	38	—	—	The Most Beautiful Colours
"Who I Hope to Be" (with Lucas Leach, Beth Easdown, India Brown, and Charles Esten)	2026	37	—	—	Drummer Boy
"Heart of a Lion" (with Lucas Leach and Melora Hardin)	2026	48	—	—	Drummer Boy
"—" denotes releases that did not chart or was not released in that territory.

== Guest appearances ==
Title	Year	Artist	Album
"Take This City" (Joel Smallbone only)	2013	Everfound	Everfound
"Infinite (Unsung Heroes)" (Joel Smallbone only)	2016	Built By Titan	non-album single
"Bring You War"	2017	KB	Today We Rebel
"Dawn" (Luke Smallbone only)	2020	Rebecca St. James	Dawn (EP)
