= Mission X =

Mission X or X-mission may refer to:

== Arts and entertainment ==
- Mission X (video game), a 1983 videogame from Mattel; see List of Intellivision games

=== Music ===
- Mission No. X (album), a 2005 album by U.D.O.
- "X-Mission" (song), a song from the 2015 film Point Break, a cover of the song "Give It Away" from the album The World's On Fire by Man on a Mission

=== Television ===
- Mission X (TV show), an Indonesian TV show, an adaptation of Running Man (런닝맨); see List of Running Man international episodes
- Mission X (Philippine TV series), a Philippine TV show (2001-2003), that won the 2002 PMPC Star Award for Best Public Service Program
- "Mission X!" (TV episode), an episode of Chousei Kantai Sazer-X
- 'Mission X' (TV segment), a challenge in the reality show Bigg Boss (Malayalam season 5)

== Vehicular and transportation ==
- Mission X "Hat Trick", a sales demonstration showcase mission of the Lockheed Martin X-35B prototype stealth fighter
- Porsche Mission X, an all-electric concept car

== Other uses ==
- XMission, an internet service provider (ISP) in Utah, USA
- Mission X - Train Like an Astronaut, a training course at the Cyprus Space Exploration Organisation

== See also ==
- Dragon Ball Heroes: Ultimate Mission X (game), a 2007 videogame
- Mission10X, an Indian non-profit for improving job skills
- Mission (disambiguation)
- X (disambiguation)
- 10 (disambiguation)
- Ten (disambiguation)
- Tenth (disambiguation)
