= World on Fire =

World on Fire or Worlds on Fire may refer to:

== Albums ==
- World on Fire, a 2006 album by By the Tree
- World's on Fire (album), a 2011 album by the Prodigy
- World on Fire (Slash album), a 2014 album
- World on Fire (Yngwie Malmsteen album), a 2016 album
- Worlds on Fire (EP), a 2020 EP by Duncan Laurence
- The World's On Fire, 2016 album by Man with a Mission

== Songs ==
- "World on Fire" (For King & Country and Taylor Hill song), a 2025 song by For King & Country featuring Taylor Hill
- "World on Fire" (Nate Smith song), 2023 song by Nate Smith from his album Nate Smith
- "World on Fire" (Sarah McLachlan song) from the Canadian singer's 2003 album Afterglow
- "World on Fire", a song by The Bouncing Souls from the 2020 album Volume 2
- "World on Fire", a song by Dolly Parton from her 2023 album Rockstar
- "World on Fire", a song by Firewind from the 2010 album Days of Defiance
- "World on Fire", a song by Krokus from the 1986 album Change of Address
- "World on Fire", a song by Luna Halo from their 2007 self-titled album
- "World on Fire", a song by Metalite from the 2019 album Biomechanicals
- "World on Fire", a song by Primal Fear from the 2007 album New Religion
- "World on Fire", a song by Thirty Seconds to Mars from the 2023 album It's the End of the World but It's a Beautiful Day
- "World on Fire", a song by Wolfheart from the 2017 album Tyhjyys
- "World on Fire", a 2013 song by The Royal Concept
- "World's on Fire" (song), by Gibraltarian band Breed 77
- "World's on Fire", a song by the Prodigy from the 2009 album Invaders Must Die
- "World's on Fire", a song by Mike Shinoda from the 2018 album Post Traumatic
- "A World on Fire", a song by Within the Ruins from the 2024 album Phenomena II

== Other uses ==
- World on Fire (book), non-fiction book by Amy Chua
- Doom 3: Worlds on Fire, novel by Matthew Costello
- World on Fire (TV series), a British war drama series
- "World on Fire" (Daredevil)

== See also ==
- Set the World on Fire (disambiguation)
- "Set My World on Fire", a song by British band The Feeling
- "Setting the World on Fire", a song by Kenny Chesney featuring Pink, from Cosmic Hallelujah
- Your World on Fire, a 2009 album by In Fear and Faith
