= Set on Fire =

Set on Fire may refer to:

- The ability to make fire. See Fire#Human control
- "Set on Fire" (song), 2016 song by American alternative band Magic Giant

== See also ==
- "Set Me on Fire", debut single of Bella Ferraro, contestant on the fourth season of The X Factor Australia.
- Set the Fire, album by Canadian alternative rock band 54-40,
- Set Yourself on Fire, album by Canadian indie rock band Stars
- Set the World on Fire (disambiguation), many articles
