= Shoulders (song) =

Single by For King & Country

from the album Run Wild. Live Free. Love Strong.
- Released: 20 March 2015
- Genre: CCM; pop rock
- Length: 5:04
- Label: Fervent, Word
- Songwriter(s): Tedd T, Ben Glover, Joel Smallbone, Luke Smallbone

For King & Country singles chronology
"Fix My Eyes" (2014)	"Shoulders" (2015)	"It's Not Over Yet" (2016)

"Shoulders" is the second single by Australian Christian alternative rock duo For King & Country on their second studio album titled Run Wild. Live Free. Love Strong. It was released on 20 March 2015. The song reached No. 4 on the Christian Songs chart and No. 1 on the Christian Airplay chart.

== Background ==
"Shoulders" was released as the second single off of the duo's second studio album, titled Run Wild. Live Free. Love Strong. Luke Smallbone commented the following about the song:

"Shoulders" was one of the last songs that we wrote for the album. Albums have a way of telling a story, and you can always tell when it's complete. Or when it's not complete. We knew we were missing a song.

We were out on the road, in the back lounge. I was working with a producer called Tedd T. We had started the song earlier in the day, but it got all messed up. It just didn't work. Joel was like, "hey man, I'm gonna go out and do something else – why don't you guys see if you can come up with anything. I'll come back later and we'll see what we got here."

I had walked through a difficult season of being super super sick – a disease I still have today – but there was a season when I was really, really, sick. We had been off the road for 2 and a half months and honestly I wasn't really sure if I was going to be able to tour again. I didn't know what my future was, really. So the question that I wanted answered was, "in your darkest moment, where does help come from? What happens when it feels like life feels totally hopeless?"

Oh man, so when I was really sick, I was ALSO an emotional disaster. To be totally honest. My sickness stems from my stomach, my gut, and that's where a lot of your happiness and joy comes from. So when that's all jacked up, you're basically depressed. I mean I didn't have any doctor tell me that I was clinically depressed, but I'm pretty sure I was. That's the way I felt, I felt like I was trapped in the valley. I was going to go see doctors left, right, and center, and still just chaos. I didn't know what was right side up and upside down, I was a mess. And I couldn't process my thoughts correctly. I felt like I was you know, kinda goin' insane."

== Composition ==
"Shoulders" is originally in the key of E-flat minor, with a tempo of 99 beats per minute.

== Music video ==
On the same day of the release of the song as a single, the duo also released a music video of song on YouTube. Joel said the following about the video:

"When it came to creating a music video for 'Shoulders,' we knew that it had to carry as much personal and spiritual meaning as the song. Ultimately, the video expands on the question about where help comes from in some of life's most difficult moments," says Luke Smallbone. "Where does that help come from when our grandfather is dying or you're looking at a newborn baby and all the challenges that lie ahead or when you've been in a car wreck and you don't know how you got out."

== Commercial performance ==
"Shoulders" reached No. 4 on the Christian Songs chart and No. 1 on the Christian Airplay chart.
