= Man with a Mission =

Japanese rock band

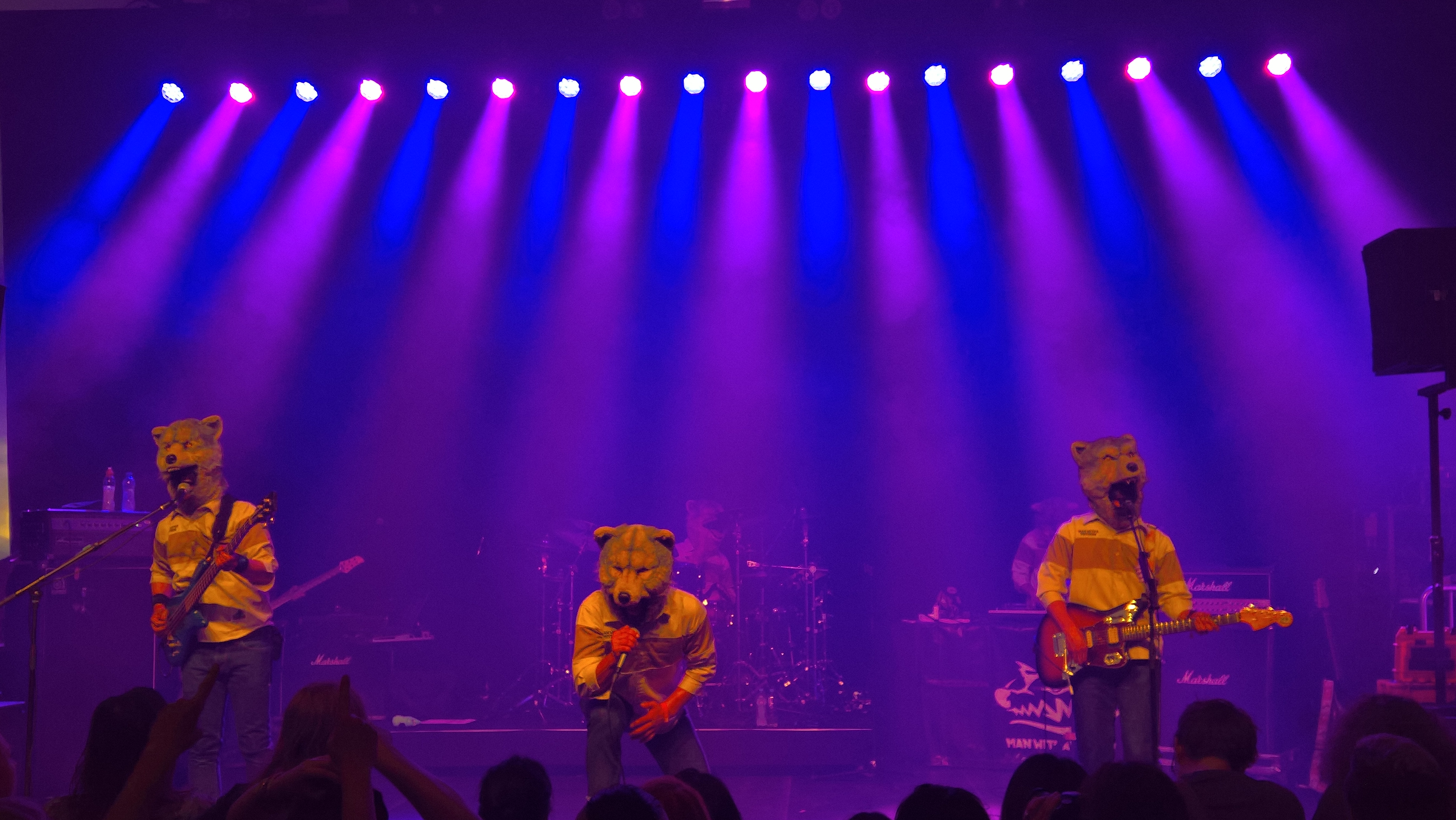
- Man with a Mission at Tuska Festival 2016 in Helsinki, Finland

Background information
- Also known as: MWAM
- Origin: Shibuya, Tokyo, Japan
- Genres: Alternative metal; nu metal; rap metal; melodic hardcore; hard rock; alternative rock
- Years active: 2010–present
- Labels: From Youth to Death Records (2010–present); Crown Stones (2011–2013); Sony Music Records (2013–present); JPU Records (EU)
- Members: Tokyo Tanaka; Jean-Ken Johnny; Kamikaze Boy; DJ Santa Monica; Spear Rib
- Website: mwamjapan.info

Man with a Mission (stylized in all caps and sometimes shortened as MWAM) is a Japanese rock band which was formed in Shibuya, Tokyo, Japan, in 2010. The band currently consists of five band members, with stage names of Tokyo Tanaka (vocals, leader), Jean-Ken Johnny (guitar, vocals, rapping), Kamikaze Boy (bass guitar, backing vocals), DJ Santa Monica (DJ, sampling) and Spear Rib (drums). Their distinguishing feature is that all of the members wear differently designed wolf masks during both their concerts and their music videos. Many of their singles have been used as theme songs for a variety of anime, live-action movies, and video games.

== Background ==
Before becoming popular, the band invented a back-story for why they wear wolf masks, which involves them being created as the "Ultimate Life Form" by Jimi Hendrix, who is described by the band as being the doctor of the guitar and master wolf biologist. They were then frozen in Antarctica for years. While they were frozen, they had been listening to all kinds of music from all around the world, before later escaping and emerging onto the Japanese music scene.

== History ==
=== Beginnings and first album ===
The earliest debut of the band was in a number of live gigs at venues in the Shibuya area. The band organized an American tour in late 2010, which was called their "Whisky a Go Go" tour and involved multiple gigs at night clubs in Los Angeles. The tour itself ended in November 2010. The end of their tour coincided with the release of their first mini album, Welcome to the New World, in November as well, which went on to sell out in a number of stores across Japan. The mini album also spent six weeks on the Oricon Top 100 for number of sales. On April 29, 2011, they released a new single titled "Never Fxxkin' Mind the Rules". After the single release, the band started another music tour on March 7, 2011, called "Man with a Mission Japan Marking Tour 2011", which included 13 different performances across Japan. Their first full debut album, Man with a Mission, released on June 8, 2011. Soon after the release of their album, they performed at Summer Sonic 2011 in mid-August, and also a number of other festivals, such as Countdown Japan 11/12. Labeled by Eggman Magazine as the "Most Promising Newcomer", tickets to their show at the concert festival sold out within ten minutes. During the stream of concerts, their songs were also run on 27 of the major FM and AM radio broadcasting stations nationwide across Japan. On October 5, 2011, the band released an EP titled Trick or Treat, which included a number of original songs and also cover songs, such as "Smells Like Teen Spirit" by Nirvana. The members of Man with a Mission were also featured in a poster campaign by Tower Records titled "No Music, No Life?", which began on September 13, 2011.

=== Mash Up the World ===
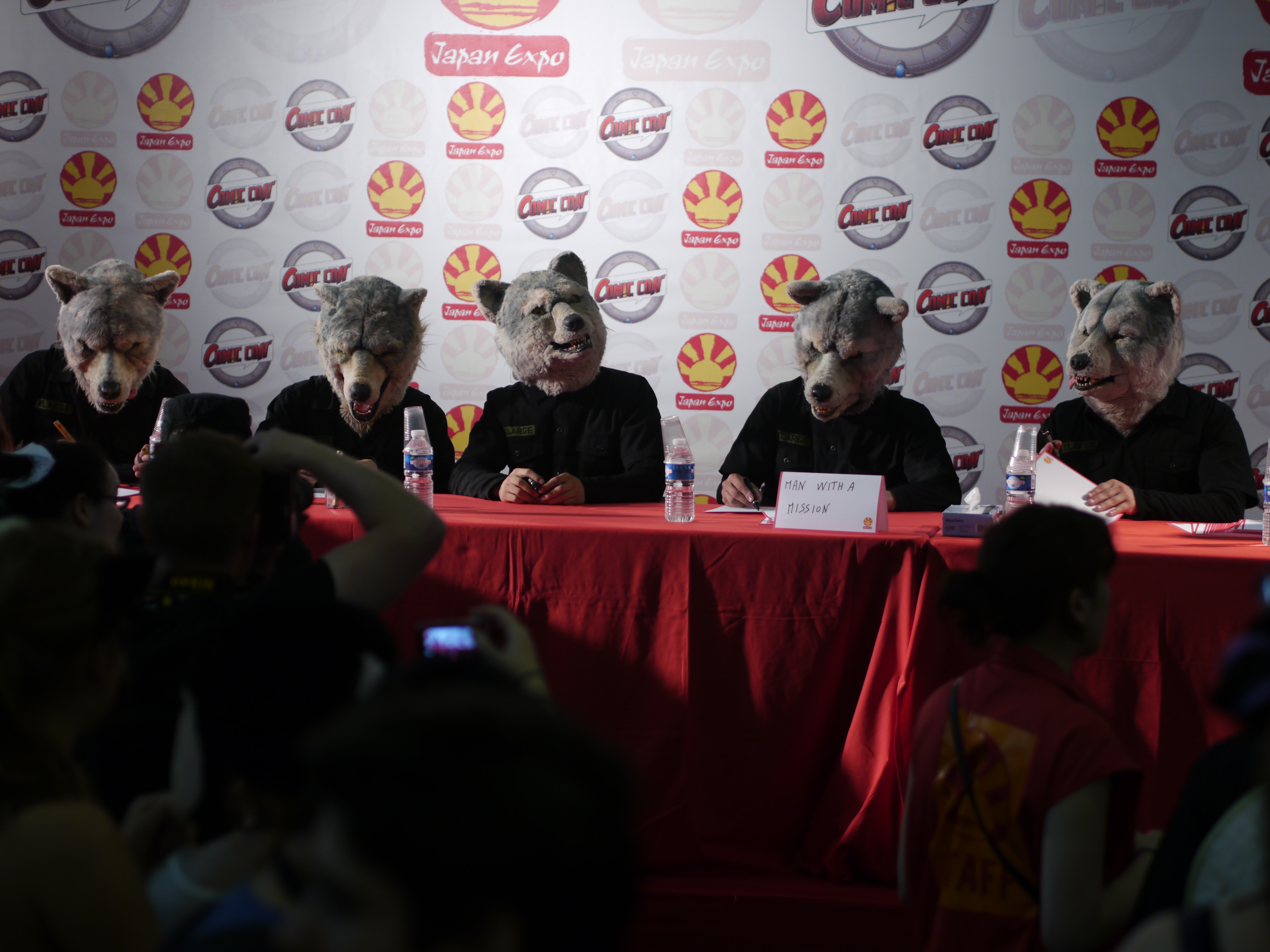
Man with a Mission at Japan Expo 2012 in Paris, France

On May 27, 2012, MWAM held a show tour at Shibuya-AX with an attendance of 1,800 fans. It was an early performance for the band's Don't Feel The Distance tour set in November, which was meant to highlight one of the singles, "Distance", from their upcoming album. The single's earlier release on April 4 to the Oricon rankings saw it rise to #6 in the sales chart. The expected stops on the tour included Zepp Nagoya, Zepp Namba, and Zepp Tokyo. Pre-order tickets for all venues of the tour were sold out "instantly" across Japan. The band's second full album, Mash Up The World, was released on July 18, 2012. The band uploaded the music video for one of the album's singles, "From Youth To Death", onto YouTube on June 21, 2012. The official app for the album also included snippets of the single, along with two other original songs, "Mash UP The DJ!" and "Neutral Corner". "Distance"'s April release also saw it being chosen as the opening theme music for TV Asahi's Music Ru TV channel for the month. The band was also invited as guests to Japan Expo 2012, playing as the rock showcase on July 5, 2012.

=== Tales of Purefly ===
Their next single, "Emotions", which was used as a theme for the live action movie adaptation of the Hentai Kamen manga, was released on February 20, 2013. The follow-up single "Database" was used as the opening theme for the anime Log Horizon Another song from the album, titled "Wake Myself Again", was used as the theme song for the live-action film of the manga Judge. Character models of the MWAM band were added to the Japanese release of the video game Pro Evolution Soccer 2015, along with the Tales of Purefly song "Higher", which was previously used in the Japanese version of World Soccer: Winning Eleven 2014 - Aoki Samurai no Chousen. The song "whatever you had said was everything" was featured in a commercial TV spot for the live action film Crows Explode, which is based on the manga Crows.

=== The World's On Fire ===
Man With a Mission performed the theme song for the anime The Seven Deadly Sins, titled "Seven Deadly Sins". The song peaked at #2 on the Billboard Japan Hot 100 and stayed for 9 weeks. Their single titled "Raise Your Flag" was featured as the opening song for the anime Mobile Suit Gundam: Iron-Blooded Orphans. The song also peaked at #2 on the Billboard Japan Hot 100 and stayed for 17 weeks. The fourth studio album titled The World's On Fire was released on February 10, 2016, preceded by the album's third single "Memories". The first song on the album, titled "Survivor", was chosen by Capcom to be the image song for the video game Street Fighter V.

=== Chasing the Horizon ===
MWAM released the single "Dead End in Tokyo" on January 25, 2017; co-written, co-composed and co-produced by Patrick Stump of Fall Out Boy, the song was used as the theme song for the movie Shinjuku Swan II. On June 27 of the same year, the band would release a second single entitled "Dog Days"; the song would be utilized in a TV commercial for Asahi Dry Zero beer in Japan. In 2017 they would also create the song "My Hero" to serve as the opening to the anime Inuyashiki as well as the song "Find You" to be used as the ending to the live action film adaptation of Anonymous Noise. The band collaborated with their fellow Japanese music group Tokyo Ska Paradise Orchestra in 2018 to create the song "Freak It!", which was released on February 2 and selected as the official song of Japan's Sunwolves Super Rugby team. On April 18, MWAM released the "Take Me Under/Winding Road" single. The band announced their fifth studio album, Chasing the Horizon, six days later; this album differs from their prior four in that this will be the first MWAM album to get an international release, while the album is set to release in Japan on June 6, it will be available digitally worldwide 2 days later and then an international version of the album will be physically released on August 10, 2018, featuring bonus materials. The single "Break the Contradictions" off the album was selected as the theme of New Japan Pro-Wrestling's 2018 G1 Climax, the company's premier tournament.

=== Ten-year anniversary ===
2020 marked the 10 year anniversary of the band's debut and they set out to do a number of things to celebrate the event. On February 17 they announced an outdoor festival called THE MISSION to celebrate this milestone; unfortunately due to the COVID-19 pandemic they were forced to cancel the festival. In addition to this festival, MWAM set out to release a trio of compilation albums; April 1 saw the release of Man with a "B-Sides & Covers" Mission while the following month saw the release of Man with a "Remix" Mission on May 17 with Man with a "Best" Mission slated to be released on July 15. On August 29 the band live streamed a concert from Zepp Tokyo online entitled MAN WITH A “REBOOT & LIVE STREAMING” MISSION, and during this show announced they would be releasing a trilogy of singles in the fall; the first single releases in October with two more to follow in November and December. On October 29 the band released the first of the singles, "Telescope", as well as broadcasting a live show from KT Zepp Yokohama online entitled MAN WITH A "Telescope" MISSION. The band released the second of their singles trilogy on November 29 entitled "All You Need" and celebrated the release with another live streamed show from Zepp Nagoya entitled MAN WITH A "All You Need" MISSION. Finally, on December 29 they released the final single, "evergeen", with a live streamed show from Zepp Fukuoka called MAN WITH A "evergreen" MISSION.

=== A new story begins ===
In their 2020 end of the year video posted to YouTube, the band announced that on February 9, 2021, a new story will begin. On January 21, 2021, they announced a new EP entitled One Wish e.p. to be released February 10. On April 28, the band released the single "Perfect Clarity". The band created the theme song for the Japanese release of Godzilla vs. Kong entitled "INTO THE DEEP", the single of the song is set to be released on June 9. The band culminated this by live-streaming the final show from their ONE WISH TOUR from Zepp Sapporo on May 14, featuring the debut of the "INTO THE DEEP" music video.

=== Break and Cross the Walls I and II ===
On October 2, 2021, the band announced they were set to release their sixth studio album Break and Cross the Walls I on November 24 of the same year. On March 14, 2022, the follow-up album Break and Cross the Walls II was announced with a release date of May 25. On April 23, the band performed a concert as part of the inaugural X Games Chiba event in Chiba, Japan. On May 8, Man with a Mission was featured on YouTube's fifth Music Weekend special event, showcasing a variety of recorded live performances by the band.

In February 2026, the band announced its Marking New Ground tour of the Americas and Europe.

== Band members ==
=== Current members ===
- Tokyo Tanaka – lead vocals (2010–present)
- Jean-Ken Johnny – guitars, co-lead vocals, rapping (2010–present)
- Kamikaze Boy – bass, backing vocals, keyboard (2010–present)
- DJ Santa Monica – turntables, keyboards/synthesizer, sampling, percussion (2010–present)
- Spear Rib – drums, percussion (2010–present)

=== Support members ===
- E.D. Vedder – guitars, keyboards (2010–present)

== Discography ==
=== Studio albums ===
Title	Album details	Peak positions		Certifications
Title	Album details	JPN		Certifications
Title	Album details	Weekly	Year-End	Certifications
Man with a Mission	Released: June 8, 2011; Label: Crown Stones; Formats: CD, LP, digital download	28	—	RIAJ: Gold (phy.)
Mash Up the World	Released: July 18, 2012; Label: Crown Stones; Formats: CD, LP, digital download	4	—	RIAJ: Gold (phy.)
Tales of Purefly	Released: March 12, 2014; Label: Sony Music; Formats: CD, LP, digital download	3	37	RIAJ: Gold (phy.)
The World's On Fire	Released: February 10, 2016; Label: Sony Music; Formats: CD, digital download	3	24	RIAJ: Gold (phy.)
Chasing the Horizon	Released: June 6, 2018; Label: Sony Music; Formats: CD, LP, digital download	2	38	RIAJ: Gold (phy.)
Break and Cross the Walls I	Released: November 24, 2021; Label: Sony Music; Formats: CD, LP, digital download	2	94	
Break and Cross the Walls II	Released: May 25, 2022; Label: Sony Music; Formats: CD, LP, digital download	4	75	
The Circus	To be released: December 23, 2026; Label: Sony Music; Formats: CD, LP, digital download	—	—	

=== Compilation albums ===
Title	Details	Peak chart positions	Certifications
Title	Details	JPN	Certifications
Title	Details	Weekly	Certifications
Beef Chicken Pork	Released: February 12, 2014; Label: Crown Stones; Formats: CD, digital download	2	
5 Years 5 Wolves 5 Souls	Released: January 1, 2015; Label: Crown Stones; Formats: CD, digital download	3	RIAJ: Gold (phy.)
Man with a "B-Sides & Covers" Mission	Released: April 1, 2020; Label: Sony Music Records; Formats: CD, digital download	1	
Man with a "Remix" Mission	Released: May 13, 2020; Label: Sony Music Records; Formats: CD, digital download	1	
Man with a "Best" Mission	Released: July 15, 2020; Label: Sony Music Records; Formats: CD, digital download	2	RIAJ: Gold (phy.)

=== Extended plays ===
Title	Details	Peak positions
Title	Details	JPN
Welcome to the Newworld	Released: November 3, 2010; Label: From Youth to Death Records; Format: Digital download	168
Trick or Treat	Released: October 5, 2011; Label: Crown Stones; Formats: CD, digital download	15
Welcome to the Newworld -Standard Edition-	Released: March 14, 2012; Label: From Youth to Death Records; Formats: CD, digital download	39
Don't Feel the Distance	Released: March 4, 2014; Label: Sony Music Records; Format: CD	—
When My Devil Rises	Released: June 10, 2014; Label: Sony Music Records; Format: CD	—
Dead End in Tokyo -European Edition-	Released: June 21, 2017; Label: Sony Music Records; Formats: CD, digital download	—
Dead End in Tokyo -World Edition-	Released: September 22, 2017; Label: Sony Music Records; Formats: CD, digital download	—
Remember Me	Released: June 14, 2019; Label: Sony Music Records; Formats: CD, digital download	—
Dark Crow	Released: October 23, 2019; Label: Sony Music Records; Formats: CD, digital download	—
One Wish	Released: February 1, 2021; Label: Sony Music Records; Formats: CD, digital download	4
XV e.p.	Released: March 12, 2025; Label: Sony Music Records; Formats: CD, digital download	6

=== Singles ===
List of singles as lead artist, showing year released, select chart positions, certifications, and album name
Title	Year	Peak chart positions			Certifications	Album
Title	Year	JPN Oricon	JPN Hot	WW	Certifications	Album
"Man with a Mission"	2010	—	—	—		Non-album single
"Don't Lose Yourself (Fxxkin' Mix)"	2010	—	—	—		Welcome to the Newworld
"Rain of July"	2011	—	66	—		Man with a Mission
"Never Fxxkin' Mind the Rules"	2011	88	—	—		Man with a Mission
"Distance"	2012	6	8	—		Mash Up the World
"Emotions"	2013	3	3	—		Tales of Purefly
"Wake Myself Again"	2013	—	25	—		Tales of Purefly
"Database" (featuring Takuma of 10-Feet)	2013	4	2	—	RIAJ: Gold (dig.)	Tales of Purefly
"Seven Deadly Sins"	2015	2	2	—	RIAJ: Gold (dig.)	The World's on Fire
"Out of Control" (featuring Zebrahead)	2015	2	45	—		The World's on Fire
"Raise Your Flag"	2015	3	2	—	RIAJ: Platinum (dig.)	The World's on Fire
"Memories"	2016	17	21	—		The World's on Fire
"Hey Now"	2016	—	25	—		Chasing the Horizon
"Dead End in Tokyo"	2017	5	5	—		Chasing the Horizon
"Dog Days"	2017	—	57	—		Chasing the Horizon
"My Hero"	2017	2	6	—		Chasing the Horizon
"Find You"	2017	2	—	—		Chasing the Horizon
"Freak It!" (featuring Tokyo Ska Paradise Orchestra)	2018	9	24	—		Chasing the Horizon
"Take Me Under"	2018	4	9	—		Chasing the Horizon
"Winding Road"	2018	4	47			Chasing the Horizon
"Left Alive"	2019	9	40	—		Break and Cross the Walls II
"Remember Me"	2019	6	5	—	RIAJ: Gold (dig.); Gold (st.)	Non-album single
"Dark Crow"	2019	3	9	—		Break and Cross the Walls II
"Change the World"	2020	4	38	—		Break and Cross the Walls I
"Telescope"	2020	—	97	—		One Wish and Break and Cross the Walls I
"All You Need"	2020	—	—	—		One Wish and Break and Cross the Walls I
"Evergreen"	2020	—	—	—		One Wish and Break and Cross the Walls I
"Into the Deep"	2021	2	25	—		Break and Cross the Walls I
"Merry-Go-Round"	2021	2	38	—		Break and Cross the Walls I
"More Than Words"	2022	—	—	—		Break and Cross the Walls II
"Fantasista"	2023	—	—	—		Non-album singles
"Kizuna no Kiseki" (絆ノ奇跡) (with Milet)	2023	4	2	140	RIAJ: Platinum (dig.); 2× Platinum (st.)	Non-album singles
"Koi Kogare" (コイコガレ) (with Milet)	2023	4	25	—	RIAJ: Gold (dig.)	Non-album singles
"I'll Be There"	2024	—	—	—		Non-album singles
"Reaching for the Sky"	2025	—	—	—		Non-album singles
"Against the Kings and Gods"	2025	—	—	—		Non-album singles
"One"	2026	—	—	—		Non-album singles
"Firestarter"	2026	6	54	—		Non-album singles
"—" denotes releases that did not chart or were not released in that region.

=== Promotional singles ===
List of promotional singles, showing year released, select chart positions, and album name
Title	Year	Peak chart positions	Album
Title	Year	JPN Hot	Album
"Higher"	2014	—	Tales of Firefly
"Evils Fall"	2014	96	Tales of Firefly
"Ano Kane o Narasu no wa Anata" (あの鐘を鳴らすのはあなた)	2018	—	Akiko o Makase ~Akiko Wada 50th Anniversary Tribute Album~
"Fly Again 2019"	2019	37	Remember Me
"86 Missed Calls" (featuring Patrick Stump)	2019	—	Dark Crow
"—" denotes releases that did not chart.

=== Other charted songs ===
List of songs not released as singles, showing year released, select chart positions, and album name
Title	Year	Peak chart positions	Album
Title	Year	JPN Hot	Album
"Feel and Think"	2011	38	Trick or Treat and Mash Up the World

=== DVDs ===
Title	DVD details	Peak positions
Title	DVD details	JPN
Wolf Complete Works I	Released: October 3, 2012; Label: Nippon Crown; Formats: DVD, Blu-ray	2
Wolf Complete Works II	Released: August 7, 2013; Label: Nippon Crown; Formats: DVD, Blu-ray	2
Wolf Complete Works III	Released: October 15, 2014; Label: Sony Music; Formats: DVD, Blu-ray	1
Wolf Complete Works IV	Released: June 29, 2016; Label: Sony Music; Formats: DVD, Blu-ray	1
Wolf Complete Works V	Released: June 14, 2017; Label: Sony Music; Formats: DVD, Blu-ray	1
Wolf Complete Works VI	Released: April 24, 2019; Label: Sony Music; Formats: DVD, Blu-ray	2
Man with a Mission The Movie –Trace the History–	Released: August 19, 2020; Label: Sony Music; Formats: DVD, Blu-ray	3

=== Covers ===
Year	Song	Original artist	Performed by	Released on	Notes
2011	"Smells Like Teen Spirit"	Nirvana	MAN WITH A MISSION	Trick or Treat EP	
2012	"Lithium"	Nirvana	MAN WITH A MISSION	Nevermind Tribute album	A tribute album by Japanese music artists (released on April 4, 2012) to celebrates 20th anniversary of Nirvana's masterpiece album Nevermind.
2021	"Thunderstruck"	AC/DC	MAN WITH A MISSION	Break and Cross the Walls I	

== Awards and nominations ==
=== MTV Video Music Awards Japan ===
Year	Nominee / work	Award	Result
2013	"Distance"	Best Rock Video	Nominated
2014	"Database" (featuring Takuma of 10-FEET)	Best Collaboration	Nominated
2015	"Out of Control" (featuring Zebrahead)	Best Collaboration	Nominated

=== CD Shop Awards ===
Year	Nominee / work	Award	Result
2013	Mash Up The World (album)	Grand Prix	Won
2015	Tales of Purefly (album)	Grand Prix	Nominated

=== Space Shower Music Awards ===
Year	Nominee / work	Award	Result
2017	Man with a Mission	Best Punk / Loud Rock Artist	Nominated

== Tours and concerts ==
=== Japan ===
- Summer Sonic Festival with Various Artists (2011)
- Rock in Japan Festival with Various Artists (2012)
- Summer Sonic Festival with Various Artists (2012)
- Enter Shikari "A Flash Flood of Colour World Tour" with Man With A Mission (2012)
- Punkspring with Various Artists (2013)
- Ozzfest Japan with Various Artists (2013)
- Summer Sonic Festival with Various Artists (2013)
- Punkspring with Various Artists (2014)
- Fuji Rock Festival with Various Artists (2014)
- Knotfest Japan with Various Artists (2014)
- Hoobastank Japan Tour with guest Man With A Mission (2014)
- Incubus Japan Tour with guest Man With A Mission (2015)
- Punkspring with Various Artists (2015)
- Rising Sun Rock Festival with Various Artists (2015)
- Summer Sonic Festival with Various Artists (2015)
- Fuji Rock Festival with Various Artists (2016)
- Knotfest Japan with Various Artists (2016)
- Guns N' Roses "Not in This Lifetime... Tour" with guest Man With A Mission (2017)
- Punkspring Extra Show with Various Artists (2017)
- X Games Chiba (2022)

=== Overseas ===
- Cash Cash Tour in the United States with guests Man With A Mission and Mitchy C (2012)
- Pentaport Rock Festival in South Korea with Various Artists (2013)
- Formoz Festival in Taiwan with Various Artists (2013)
- Twinkle Rock Festival in Taiwan with Various Artists (2013)
- Knotfest in the United States with Various Artists (2014)
- Rise Against Tour in Russia with guest Man With A Mission (2015)
- Download Festival in the United Kingdom with Various Artists (2015)
- MXPX Tour in Germany with guest Man With A Mission (2015)
- Zebrahead European Tour in Germany with guests Man With A Mission and MXPX (2015)
- Zebrahead European Tour in the United Kingdom with guests Man With A Mission and Patent Pending (2015)
- Tuska Heatseeker in Finland with Various Artists (2016)
- Knotfest in the United States with Various Artists (2016)
- Tuska Heatseeker in Finland with Various Artists (2017)
- Dobrofest in Russia with Various Artists (2017)
- Jimmy Eat World Tour in the United States with guest Man With A Mission (2017)
- Stone Sour Fall 2017 U.S. Tour in the United States with guests Man With A Mission and Steel Panther (2017)
- WOLVES ON PARADE Tour in North America and Europe (2023)

== Stadium anthem ==
Their song, "Fly Again" is a stadium anthem for the Akita Northern Happinets of the Japanese B.League.

== See also ==
- Japanese rock
