= The Circus (Man with a Mission album) =

The Circle

Studio album by Man with a Mission
- Released: December 23, 2026
- Labels: Sony; Century Media

Man with a Mission chronology
XV e.p. (2025)	The Circle (2026)

Singles from The Circle
- 1. "Firestarter" Released: October 28, 2026

The Circus is the eighth studio album by Japanese rock band Man with a Mission. The album will be released on December 23, 2026 through Sony Music Records and internationally by Century Media Records.

== Release and promotion ==
On October 28, 2026, Man with a Mission announced their eighth studio album The Circus, set for release on December 23, 2026.

On August 29, 2025, Men with a Mission released the single "Against the Fire and Gods". On August 29, 2026, they released the single "One", which was written for the Japanese football club Cerezo Osaka as their anthem. On September 18, 2026, the band released another single "The Animals", which is the theme song for the 2026 Japanese crime thriller film "Wara nimo Sugaru Kemono tachi". "Against the Fire and Gods", "One" and "The Animals" would be included in the album The Circus.

On October 11, 2026, the band released the single "Firestarter", which is the opening theme for anime The Vermilion Mask. It became the lead single for The Circus.

== Track listing ==
No.	Title	Length
1.	"Against the Kings and Gods"	4:16
2.	"Firestarter"	3:54
3.	"Highlights"
4.	"Issen"
5.	"Kizuna no Kiseki"
6.	"Nothing to Lose"
7.	"One"	4:11
8.	"The Animals"	3:51
9.	"Turn the Table"

== Personnel ==
=== Man with a Mission ===
- Tokyo Tanaka – lead vocals
- Jean-Ken Johnny – electric guitar and co-lead vocals
- Kamikaze Boy – electric bass guitar and backing vocals
- DJ Santa Monica – electronic keyboards and DJing
- Spear Rib – drum kit
