= Fix My Eyes =

Single by For King & Country

from the album Run Wild. Live Free. Love Strong.
- Released: 1 May 2014
- Genre: CCM
- Length: 3:35
- Label: Fervent, Word
- Songwriters: Seth Mosley, Joel Smallbone, Luke Smallbone

For King & Country singles chronology
"Hope Is What We Crave" (2013)	"Fix My Eyes" (2014)	"Shoulders" (2015)

"Fix My Eyes" is the first single by American Christian alternative rock duo For King & Country on their second studio album titled Run Wild. Live Free. Love Strong. It was released on 1 May 2014. The song reached No. 3 on the Christian Songs chart, No. 1 on the Christian Airplay chart, No. 38 on the Adult Top 40 chart. This is the first song by the duo to ever reach No. 1 on a chart.

== Background ==
"Fix My Eyes" was released as the first single off of the duo's second studio album, titled Run Wild. Live Free. Love Strong. Luke Smallbone commented the following about the song:

Before our second album we did an EP, a Christmas EP, and on that album we did a song called “Little Drummer Boy.” When we did that song we also did Christmas tours and Christmas shows, and the intro to the whole show was “Little Drummer Boy.” It was so cool, but the issue was, once Christmas was done, we didn’t have an intro for our show! So we started writing an intro, went into the studio saying, “we need an intro for our show, and we want it to be kind of like this other intro we had.” “Fix My Eyes” was birthed out of kind of a whole other song idea that was a Christmas song, and that’s how we got the feel and the rhythm and the tempo for the song – we wanted it to be the beginning of our show. We asked ourselves some questions: who do we want to be? who are we as a band? what is most important? what is still more important than our careers? and we really came down to the fact that fixing our eyes on heaven is the most important thing that we can do despite all of these other good things. And that list really is in the song. It’s “love like we’re not scared, give when it’s not fair, take time for a brother”, you know all those things, we realize above everything, for us, the most important thing is to fix our eyes on heaven.

== Composition ==
"Fix My Eyes" is originally in the key of C major, with a tempo of 100 beats per minute.

== Commercial performance ==
"Fix My Eyes" reached No. 3 on the Christian Songs chart, which then tied with "Busted Heart (Hold On to Me)" for their highest-ranking song on the chart. The song reached No. 1 on the Christian Airplay chart, becoming the duo's first song to ever reach the mark. The song reached No. 38 on the Adult Top 40 chart.

== Certifications ==
Certifications for "Fix My Eyes"
Region	Certification	Certified units/sales
United States (RIAA)	Platinum	1,000,000^{‡}
^{‡} Sales+streaming figures based on certification alone.
