= Christmas: Live from Phoenix =

Live album by For King & Country
- Released: 27 October 2017
- Recorded: 18 December 2016
- Venue: Grand Canyon University Arena, Phoenix, Arizona
- Genre: Christmas, contemporary Christian music, Christian alternative rock
- Length: 36:47
- Label: Word Entertainment
- Producer: For King & Country; Blake Kanicka; Seth Mosley; Tedd Tjornhom

For King & Country chronology
Run Wild. Live Free. Love Strong. (2014)	Christmas: Live from Phoenix (2017)	Burn the Ships (2018)

Christmas: Live From Phoenix (sometimes stylized as Christmas - Live From Phoenix, Christmas | Live From Phoenix, or A for KING & COUNTRY Christmas | LIVE From Phoenix) is the first live album and third album overall by For King & Country, an Australian-American Christian pop duo consisting of brothers Luke and Joel Smallbone, released via Word Entertainment on 27 October 2017. The album features the band playing cover versions of popular Christmas tunes and original material. It features an appearance from Rebecca St. James, who joined the band for live rendition of "The Proof of Your Love". For King & Country collaborated with Blake Kanicka, Seth Mosley and Tedd Tjornhom in the arrangement of the album.

== Recording ==
The album was recorded in Phoenix, Arizona at Grand Canyon University Arena on the final night of the band's 2016 Christmas tour.

== Touring ==
Throughout November and December 2016 the band embarked on a 15-date tour under the name "A for KING & COUNTRY Christmas".

== Critical reception ==
Professional ratings
Review scores
Source	Rating
Jesus Freak Hideout	4/5 stars

Christmas: Live from Phoenix prompted positive reactions, echoed in reviews about the collection from critics within the Contemporary Christian music genre. Alex Caldwell from Jesus Freak Hideout described the album as a story that was "deserving a musical soundtrack" filled with warm feelings and nostalgia. He praised the band's original Christmas songs like "Baby Boy" and "Glorious" for their "seamless fit into the concert flow".

== Commercial performance ==
In the United States, Christmas: Live from Phoenix debuted at No. 194 on the mainstream Billboard 200 chart dated 30 December 2017. The album debuted at No. 5 on Billboard's Christian Albums chart on 9 December 2017, was also the twenty-second best-selling digital release in the country that same week.

== Track listing ==
Christmas: Live from Phoenix
No.	Title	Writer(s)	Length
1.	"Little Drummer Boy"	Henry Onorati; Harry Simeone	4:38
2.	"O Come, O Come Emmanuel"	Traditional	4:14
3.	"Won't You Come (Interlude)"		1:24
4.	"Baby Boy"	Seth Mosley; Joel Smallbone; Luke Smallbone	3:43
5.	"Angels We Have Heard on High"	Traditional	3:59
6.	"Glorious"	Andy Mineo; J. Smallbone; L. Smallbone; Tedd Tjornhom	3:54
7.	"Into the Silent Night"	Matt Hammitt; Mosley; J. Smallbone; L. Smallbone	3:33
8.	"Hark The Herald Angels Sing"	Traditional	3:34
9.	"Joy to the World"	Traditional	4:31
10.	"The Proof of Your Love" (featuring Rebecca St. James)	Mia Fieldes; Ben Glover; Jonathan Lee; J. Smallbone; L. Smallbone; Fred Williams	5:17
Total length:			36:47

== Charts ==
Chart (2017–2019)	Peak position
US Billboard 200	184
US Christian Albums (Billboard)	5
US Top Holiday Albums (Billboard)	15
