= The Most Beautiful Colours =

Studio album by For King & Country
- Released: 18 September 2026
- Genres: Pop; contemporary
- Length: 34:59
- Label: Word
- Producers: For King & Country; Taylor Hill; Rodney Jerkins; Josh Kerr; Jeff Sojka; Tedd T.

For King & Country chronology
What Are We Waiting For? (2022)	The Most Beautiful Colours (2026)

Singles from The Most Beautiful Colours
- 1. "World on Fire" Released: 2 October 2025; 2. "Ever and Ever Before" Released: 30 January 2026; 3. "What If I Told You?" Released: 8 July 2026

The Most Beautiful Colours is the sixth studio album by the Australian Christian pop duo For King & Country. It was released on 18 September 2026, through Word Entertainment, to CD, LP, digital download, and streaming formats. The album was produced by For King & Country members Joel and Luke Smallbone alongside Josh Kerr and Tedd Tjornhom. The Most Beautiful Colours features guest appearances from Taylor Hill, Jessica Simpson, and the band members' wives, Courtney and Moriah Smallbone. Its ten tracks contain writing credits from C. Smallbone, Jeff Sojka, J. Smallbone, Jonathan Gamble, Kerr, Jordan Reynolds, L. Smallbone, M. Smallbone, Tjornhom, Hill, and Tyler Hubbard.

The Most Beautiful Colours was supported with the release of three singles, including "World on Fire" on 2 October 2025, "Ever and Ever Before" on 30 January 2026, and "What If I Told You?" on 8 July 2026, as well as two promotional singles, including "Miracle" on 5 June 2026 and "Alle" on 14 August 2026. "World on Fire" peaked at number 9 on the Billboard Hot Christian Songs chart, number 29 on the RadioScope New Zealand Airplay chart, and number 1 on the TCM Australian Christian Airplay chart, while "What If I Told You?" reached at number 33 on the Hot Christian Songs chart and "Miracle" reached number 38 and led the Australian Christian Airplay chart; "Alle" reached number 47 on the Hot Christian Songs chart and number 22 on the New Zealand Airplay chart.

== Background and release ==
Following the success of the biopic Unsung Hero in 2024, For King & Country went on a short hiatus from recording and touring. On 17 September 2025, the group announced the release date for the album's lead single, "World on Fire", which would mark the duo's first release of original music in over a year. It was also announced that the track would appear on an upcoming 2026 album, although further details were not released at that time. On 2 October 2025, the song was released to Christian radio in the United States, before being released to digital download and streaming formats the following day. "World on Fire" was promoted with an official music video, which was premiered to YouTube upon release.

The second single from The Most Beautiful Colours, "Ever and Ever Before" – a Valentine's Day-themed collaboration with Joel and Luke Smallbone's wives, Courtney and Moriah Smallbone – was released on 30 January 2026. The track was also announced to appear on the upcoming album. Upon release, a lyric video was uploaded to YouTube, and subsequently a music video.

In May 2026, the group announced the upcoming release of The Most Beautiful Colours, and concurrently the band also announced the release date of the upcoming track "Miracle" and the fall 2026 The Most Beautiful Colours Tour. "Miracle", the album's first promotional single, was released on 5 June 2026, and that same day the album was made available for pre-order. "Miracle" was promoted with the release of a music video, which was uploaded to YouTube. On 8 July 2026, "What if I Told You?" was premiered to K-Love radio stations as the third and final single from the album. It was released commercially on 10 July, and was promoted with a music video, which was uploaded to YouTube. "Alle" was released on 14 August 2026 as the album's second promotional single.

=== Tour ===
It was announced on 18 May 2026 that The Most Beautiful Colours would be promoted with an eponymous album release tour. The tour is scheduled to begin on 24 September 2026 and visit sixteen venues in Canada and the United States until its conclusion on 18 October. Tickets were made available for purchase beginning on 22 May, with an exclusive presale available starting 19 May.

== Style ==
The Most Beautiful Colours has been described by the duo as "our most hope-filled yet", and is characteristically "theatrical" and "ambitious", containing a "cinematic sound" and "massive production"; despite its large-scale production, the album has still been described as "ultimately far more personal”, and CCM Magazine described it as one of the duo's "most mature records". It incorporates a heavy synthesizer-driven sound and a "youth-group-anthem energy", and on occasion orchestral strings and acoustic instruments. Lyrically, the album features "powerful storytelling" and is "intentional and direct", although topically details "surprisingly ordinary things"—that is, topics of everyday life.

== Reception ==
Professional ratings
Review scores
Source	Rating
Jesus Freak Hideout	3.5/5 stars
Jubliee Cast	4/5 stars
Today's Christian Entertainment	5/5 stars

=== Critical ===
The Most Beautiful Colours received positive reception from critics. In a 4-out-of-5 star rating for Jubilee Cast, Timothy Yap wrote that the album "gains depth from its emphasis on family and from collaborations that broaden the duo's familiar sound", and describing it as "admirably focused". Writing for Today's Christian Entertainment, Jay Heilman rated the album 5-out-of-5, labelling the album as the band's "absolute best yet". Marcus Cheong of Sight made note of the album's "anthemic, catchy, and positive" style which he described as "easy to listen to". K-Love's Lindsay Williams found the album to be "bright" and "imagery-rich", while Kevin McNeese of New Release Today observed that the album is "joyful, vibrant, and optimistic".

=== Commercial ===
Of the three singles and two promotional singles released ahead of The Most Beautiful Colours, all five charted on at least one chart. "World on Fire", the album's lead single, was the most commercially successful of the five releases. Within two weeks of its release, it became the most-added song to Christian radio in the United States in 2025. In Australia, it debuted at number 6 on the TCM Australian Christian Airplay chart and reached number 1 within four weeks. In New Zealand, it debuted at number 29 on the RadioScope New Zealand Airplay chart, its peak position, while in the United Kingdom it debuted atop the Cross Rhythms Christian Airplay chart. In the United States, "World on Fire" debuted at number 16 on the Billboard Hot Christian Songs chart and at number 17 on Digital Song Sales, ssubsequently peaked at number 12 on Hot Christian Songs in April 2026 and later reaching number 19 on the Adult Pop Airplay chart in July.

Although not charting internationally, the second single from the album, "Ever and Ever Before", debuted at number 15 and later peaked at number 10 on the TCM Australian Christian Airplay chart. "What If I Told You?", the third single, reached number 10 on the TCM Australian Christian Airplay chart. In the United States, it debuted at number 33 on the Billboard Hot Christian Songs chart. "Miracle", the album's first promotional single, debuted at number 18 and later topped the TCM Australian Christian Airplay chart, and in the United States, reached number 38 on the Billboard Hot Christian Songs chart. "Alle", the second promotional single, reached number 47 on the Billboard Hot Christian Songs chart and number 22 on the RadioScope New Zealand Airplay chart.

=== Accolades ===
Year	Organization	Nominee / work	Category	Result	Ref.
2025	We Love Awards	"World on Fire" (featuring Taylor Hill)	Song of the Year	Nominated	
2025	We Love Awards	"World on Fire" (featuring Taylor Hill)	Pop Song of the Year	Nominated	
2025	We Love Awards	"World on Fire" (featuring Taylor Hill)	Music Video of the Year	Nominated	
2026	CMAA	"World on Fire" (featuring Taylor Hill)	Australian Song of the Year	Pending	
2026	Dove Awards	"World on Fire" (featuring Taylor Hill)	Short Form Music Video of the Year (Concept)	Pending	

== Track listing ==
The Most Beautiful Colours track listing
No.	Title	Writer(s)	Producer(s)	Length
1.	"World on Fire" (featuring Taylor Hill)	Joel Smallbone; Luke Smallbone; Taylor Hill; Tedd Tjornhom	For King & Country; Taylor Hill; Tedd T.	3:16
2.	"Miracle"	J. Smallbone; Josh Kerr; L. Smallbone; Tjornhom	For King & Country; Kerr; Tedd T.	2:45
3.	"What If I Told You?"	J. Smallbone; L. Smallbone; Jonathan Gamble; Kerr; Jeff Sojka	For King & Country; Sojka; Tedd T.	3:02
4.	"Alle"	J. Smallbone; L. Smallbone; Kerr; Jordan Reynolds; Tjornhom	For King & Country; Kerr; Tedd T.	3:16
5.	"Ever & Ever Before" (featuring Courtney Smallbone and Moriah)	J. Smallbone; L. Smallbone; Tyler Hubbard; Kerr; Courtney Smallbone; Moriah Smallbone	For King & Country; Kerr; Tedd T.	3:50
6.	"Thank God"	J. Smallbone; L. Smallbone; Kerr; Zachary Lawson	For King & Country; Kerr; Tedd T.	3:25
7.	"A Good Man"	J. Smallbone; L. Smallbone; Ran Jackson; Ricky Jackson	For King & Country; Kerr; Tedd T.	3:57
8.	"My Mosaic" (featuring Jessica Simpson)	J. Smallbone; L. Smallbone; Kerr; Jessica Simpson	For King & Country; Kerr	4:17
9.	"Loved"	J. Smallbone; L. Smallbone; Emmanuel Chukwuka; Anyanwu Eno; Rodney Jerkins; Kerr; Tjornhom	For King & Country; Kerr; Tedd T.	3:36
10.	"The Most Beautiful Colours"	J. Smallbone; L. Smallbone; Jerkins; Ben Samama; Tjornhom; Bas van Daalen	For King & Country; Jerkins; Tedd T.	3:35
Total length:				34:59

== Personnel ==
Credits are adapted from Tidal.

=== For King & Country ===
- Joel Smallbone – vocals (all tracks), background vocals (track 1), pump organ (5)
- Luke Smallbone – vocals (1–7, 9–10), percussion (1, 5, 6, 8), background vocals (1, 8), drums (3, 5, 9)

=== Additional musicians ===
- Danny Lopez – keyboards (1–5, 7), programming (1, 3, 5, 7), bass (1)
- Paul Mabury – drums (1–5), percussion (5)
- Javier Solis – percussion (1–5), drums (5)
- Akil Thompson – electric guitar (1, 7), guitar (2–4, 10)
- Taylor Hill – keyboards (1–4); background vocals, bass guitar, drum machine, guitar, programming, vocals (1)
- Vince DiCarlo – bass guitar (1, 2, 4, 5), acoustic guitar (1, 5, 7)
- Caleb Dukes – keyboards, programming (1, 3, 5, 7, 9, 10)
- Tedd Tjornhom – keyboards, programming (1, 3, 5, 7, 9, 10)
- Jake Halm – keyboards, programming (1, 3, 5, 9, 10); horns (5), guitar (10)
- Bethany Cruz – background vocals (1)
- Benjamin Thompson – keyboards, programming (3, 5, 7, 9, 10); synthesizer (6, 8)
- Hannah Tyler – strings (3, 5)
- Dayme – programming (3, 6, 8), keyboards (3)
- AJ Hall – drums (3, 9)
- Jeff Sojka – keyboards, programming (3)
- Josh Kerr – programming (5, 6, 8–10), acoustic guitar (5, 6, 8, 9), keyboards (5, 10), synthesizer (6, 8), guitar (8, 10)
- Courtney Smallbone – vocals (5)
- Moriah Smallbone – vocals (5)
- Zachary Lawson – piano (6)
- Davide Rossi – strings (7, 9, 10)
- Ran Jackson – acoustic guitar, keyboards, programming (7)
- Joseph Prielozny – acoustic guitar (7)
- James McAllister – drums (7)
- Allison Marin – strings (7)
- Antonio Marin – strings (7)
- Stanton Edward – electric guitar (8)
- Jessica Simpson – vocals (8)
- Rodney Jerkins – keyboards, programming (9, 10)
- Jude Smallbone – background vocals (9)
- Phoenix Smallbone – background vocals (9)
- Garrett P. Tyler – drums (9)
- Cole Tague – background vocals, guitar, keyboards, programming (10)
- Joe Henderson – guitar, keyboards, programming (10)
- Stephen Stanley – guitar (10)
- Zach Epps – guitar (10)

=== Technical and creative ===
- Caleb Dukes – engineering (1, 3, 5, 7, 9, 10), editing (1, 3, 5, 7, 10)
- Jake Halm – engineering (1, 3, 5, 7, 9, 10), editing (1, 3, 5, 7, 10)
- Tedd T. – engineering (1, 3, 5, 7, 9, 10), editing (1, 3, 5, 7, 10)
- Craig White – engineering (1, 3, 5)
- AJ Hall – engineering (3, 9)
- Josh Kerr – engineering (6, 8), editing (8)
- Ran Jackson – engineering, editing (7)
- Bart Schoudel – engineering, vocal production (8)
- Davide Rosse – engineering (9, 10)
- Garrett P. Tyler – engineering (9)
- David Bates – engineering assistance (1, 3, 5, 7)
- Wills Kookogey – engineering assistance (1, 3, 5, 7)
- Rob Kinelski – mixing (1, 3–7), immersive mixing (3, 4, 6, 7)
- Doug Weier – mixing (8–10)
- Eli Heisler – mixing assistance (1, 3–7), immersive mixing (3, 4, 6)
- Carl Markham – mixing assistance (8–10)
- Dave Kutch – mastering (1, 3, 5–10)
- Blair McDermott – art direction

== Charts ==
Chart performance for The Most Beautiful Colours
Chart (2026)	Peak position
Australian Albums (ARIA)	13
UK Album Downloads (Official Charts)	70
US Independent Albums (Billboard)	46
US Top Album Sales (Billboard)	22
US Top Christian Albums (Billboard)	4

== Release history ==
Release history and formats for The Most Beautiful Colours
Region	Date	Format	Label
Various	18 September 2026	CD; LP; digital download; streaming	Word
