= 2015 MTV Video Music Awards Japan =

Annual Japanese music awards ceremony

- 2015 MTV VMAJ title card
- Date: November 26, 2015
- Location: Act Square, Tokyo
- Country: Japan
- Hosted by: Verbal
- Most awards: Namie Amuro (3)
- Website: MTV VMAJ 2015

Television/radio coverage
- Network: MTV Japan

The 2015 MTV Video Music Awards Japan was held in Tokyo on November 26, 2015 and was hosted by Verbal from m-flo.

== Presenters ==
- Little Mix – presented Dempagumi.inc with their MTV EMA Best Japanese Act (Note: Dempagumi originally won the award at the 2015 MTV Europe Music Awards held in October.) award
- Kazuto Koya – presented the Contribution to Entertainment Award

== Winners and nominees ==
Winners are highlighted in bold.

Video of the Year	Best Male Video – Japan
**Sandaime J Soul Brothers — "Eeny, meeny, miny, moe!"**; Namie Amuro — "Birthday"; Ariana Grande (featuring Iggy Azalea) — "Problem"; Doberman Infinity — "Infinity"; Gen Hoshino — "Sun"; Momoiro Clover Z vs Kiss — "Yume no Ukiyo ni Saite Mina"; OK Go — "I Won't Let You Down"; Pharrell Williams — "Freedom"; Years & Years — "King"	**Gen Hoshino — "SUN"**; AK-69 – "The Throne"; AKLO (featuring Salu, H.Teflon, and K Dub Shine) – "RGTO"; Ken Hirai – "Soredemo Shitai"
Best Male Video – International	Best Female Video – Japan
**Pharrell Williams — "Freedom"**; Flying Lotus (featuring Kendrick Lamar) — "Never Catch Me"; Kendrick Lamar — "King Kunta"; Mark Ronson — "Uptown Funk" featuring Bruno Mars; Sam Smith — "I'm Not The Only One"	**Namie Amuro — "Birthday"**; Rina Katahira – "Kemutai"; Koda Kumi – "Walk of My Life"; Ringo Sheena – "Nagaku Mijikai Matsuri"; Superfly – "On Your Side"
Best Female Video – International	Best Group Video – Japan
**Ariana Grande (featuring Iggy Azalea) — "Problem"**; Carly Rae Jepsen — "I Really Like You"; Madonna (featuring Nicki Minaj) — "Bitch I'm Madonna"; Sia — "Chandelier"; Taylor Swift – "Blank Space"	**J Soul Brothers from Exile Tribe – "Eeny, meeny, miny, moe"**; One Ok Rock – "Mighty Long Fall"; Perfume – "Pick Me Up"; Sakanaction – "Shin Takarajima"; Sekai no Owari – "Anti-Hero"
Best Group Video – International	Best New Artist Video – Japan
**OK Go — "I Won't Let You Down"**; The Chemical Brothers — "Go"; Imagine Dragons — "I Bet My Life"; Maroon 5 — "Sugar"; Muse — "Dead Inside"	**Doberman Infinity – Infinity**; Awesome City Club – "April March"; Charisma.com – "Otubone Rock"; The fin. – "Night Time"; Sakura Fujiwara – "Walking on the Clouds"
Best New Artist Video – International	Best Collaboration
**Years & Years — "King"**; FKA Twigs — "Two Weeks"; James Bay — "Hold Back The River"; Jess Glynne — "Hold My Hand"; Royal Blood — "Figure It Out"	**Momoiro Clover Z vs Kiss – "Yume no Ukiyo ni Saitemina"**; Basement Jaxx (featuring Team Syachihoko) – "Back 2 the Wild (Japanese ver.)"; Flower (featuring Little Mix) – "Dreamin' Together"; Man with a Mission (featuring Zebrahead) – "Out of Control"; Owl City (featuring Sekai no Owari) – "Tokyo"
Best Rock Artist	Best Hip Hop Artist
**Vamps**	**AK-69**
Best R&B Artist	Best Dance Artist Artist
**Daichi Miura**	**Perfume**
Best Metal Artist	Best Creativity
**Babymetal**	**Namie Amuro**
Best Live Performance	Next Break Artist
**Basement Jaxx with Team Syachihoko**	**Beat Buddy Boi**; 04 Limited Sazabys – Terminal; Aisha – Candy Love; Akasick – CG Gal; Aono Saho – Once in a Lifetime; Alaha Meiri – 21 ANTHEM; Beat Buddy Boi – come again; banvox – Summer; Berry Goodman – Light Stand; Daoko – Kakete Ageru; Glim Spanky – Otona ni Nattara; Hanae – Kamisama no Kamisama; Kira – Nadeshiko Soul; Kirishima Nodoka – Kaze; lol – fire!; Natsume Mito – Maegami Kirisugita (Genchou Version); My First Story – Alone; Saku – Start Me Up; Saue to Nakae – SO.RE.NA; Spicysol – Awake; Yup'in – Humanity
Contribution to Entertainment Award
**Ken Hirai**; **Kumi Koda**; **Juju**
