= List of Running Man international episodes =

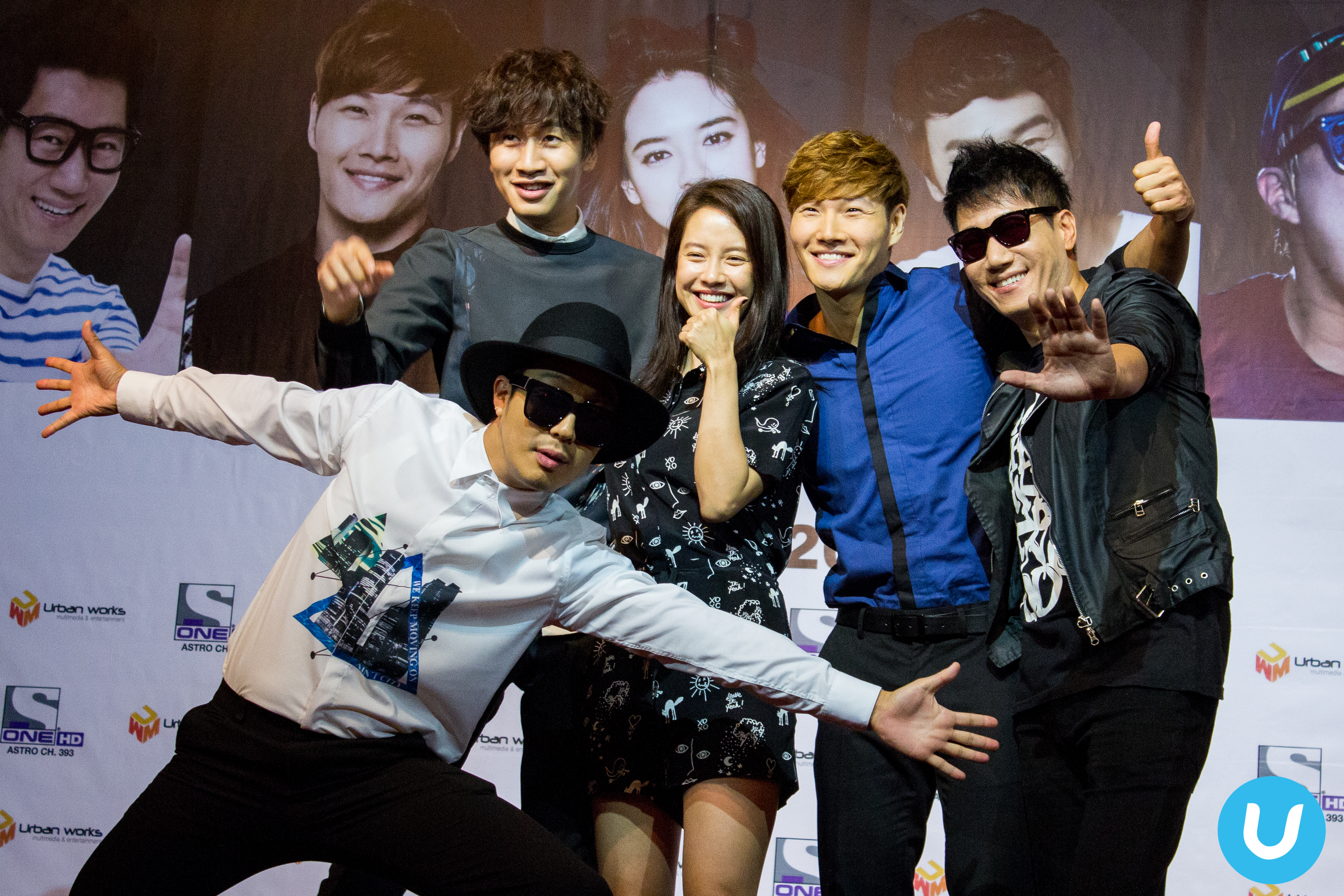
Running Man Cast in Malaysia for the 2014 Running Man Fan Meeting; from left to right: Haha, Lee Kwang-soo, Song Ji-hyo, Kim Jong-kook, and Ji Suk-jin

In November 2011, the rights to air the show was sold to nine areas in Asia, namely Taiwan, Thailand, Indonesia, China, Hong Kong, Japan, Singapore, Cambodia, and Malaysia, proving Running Man's rise in popularity as a Hallyu program. In January 2013, SBS announced Running Man in Asia as one of the big projects of 2013. Producer Jo Hyo-jin stated that the program would be touring two countries in Asia in the first half of 2013. The program has previously travelled to Thailand, China, and Hong Kong for filming. Jo Hyo-jin has also mentioned interests raised by Singaporean television stations in purchasing the Running Man format, which reiterated Running Man's popularity in Asia.

Producer Im Hyung-taek confirmed that the program would be filming in Macau, China and Hanoi, Vietnam in early February, and the respective episodes were aired on television in late February and early March. In February 2014, Jo Hyo-jin announced that the program was invited by the Australian Tourist Commission to film in Australia, and did so in mid-February which aired in March.

A spin-off of Running Man, titled Keep Running, was announced in May 2014. The spin-off, which is the Chinese version of Running Man was scheduled to air in the fourth quarter of 2014 on Zhejiang Television. Cast from the Korean version will participate in the Chinese version as well. The spin-off was a success, and currently the show has aired its 10th season (in 2025). There was also an Indonesian adaptation of the show, titled Mission X, following a similar format on the show, with the exception that the members would using armbands, and the games would be played just for fun rather than playing it to win the prize.

== International episodes ==
The popularity of Running Man throughout Asia provided the opportunity to take the show outside of South Korea. Running Man has traveled to various countries including China, Thailand, Vietnam, Australia, Indonesia, Taiwan, and the United Arab Emirates. International episodes are notable for their ability to draw large groups of fans to mission venues.

Episode(s)	Airdate(s)	Location(s)	Guest(s)	Notes
50 – 51	July 3 – 10, 2011	Thailand	Kim Min-jung Nichkhun (2PM)	—N/a
61 – 62	September 18 – 25, 2011	Beijing, China	Kang Ji-young (Kara) Kim Joo-hyuk Lee Yeon-hee	Kang Ji-young appeared as substitute for Song Jihyo in episode 61.
72 – 73	December 11 – 18, 2011	Hong Kong	Jung Yong-hwa (CNBLUE) Lee Min-jung	—N/a
97	June 3, 2012	Thailand	Park Ji-sung IU	IU missed half of the episode due to schedule conflicts, and Yoo Jae-suk had to leave early due to schedule conflicts as well.
133	February 17, 2013	Macau, China	Han Hye-jin Lee Dong-wook	Kim Jong Kook missed half of the episode due to ankle injury
134, 136	February 24, March 10, 2013	Vietnam	Han Hye-jin Lee Dong-wook	
153, 154	July 14, 2013	Shanghai, China	Koo Ja-cheol Park Ji-sung Patrice Evra Sulli (f(x))	
188 – 189, 191	March 9 – 16, March 30, 2014	Australia	Kim Woo-bin Rain	Song Ji-hyo did not appear in episode 188 due to schedule conflicts.
200	June 15, 2014	Indonesia	Park Ji-sung	—N/a
212	September 7, 2014	Taiwan	Ailee Ji Chang-wook Kim Tae-woo (g.o.d) Lee Sung-jae Lim Seul-ong (2AM) Skull (singer) Song Eun-yi	Only Yoo Jae-suk, Haha, Ji Suk-jin, Lee Kwang-soo, Ji Chang-wook, Lee Sung-jae, and Skull appeared in the Taiwan section. Song Eun-yi originally was supposed to appear as well, but eventually did not due to schedule conflicts.
234	February 15, 2015	Hong Kong; Thailand	Fei (Miss A) Kim Sung-ryung Seo Woo Shoo Taecyeon (2PM) Yeon Jung-hoon Yoo Sun	Certain parts of the episode.
283 – 284	January 24 – 31, 2016	Shanghai, China	Ji So-yun Jong Tae-se Park Ji-sung	—N/a
289 – 290	March 6 – 13, 2016	Dubai, United Arab Emirates	Jung Il-woo Lee Da-hae	—N/a
347 – 348	April 23 – 30, 2017	Osaka, Japan; Taipei, Taiwan	Jang Do-yeon	Yoo Jae-suk, Ji Suk-jin, and Jeon So-min appeared in the Osaka section of the episode while Haha, Song Ji-hyo, and Yang Se-chan appeared in the Taipei section of the episode.
351 – 352	May 21 – 28, 2017	Ulaanbaatar, Mongolia; Vladivostok, Russia	No guests	Yoo Jae-suk, Ji Suk-jin, Song Ji-hyo, and Jeon So-min appeared in the Mongolia section of the episode while Kim Jong-kook, Haha, Lee Kwang-soo, and Yang Se-chan appeared in the Russia section of the episode.
353 – 355	June 4 – 18, 2017	Yokohama, Japan; Yamanashi, Japan; Tokyo, Japan	Jung Hye-sung	Jung Hye-sung only appeared in episode 355.
369 – 371	September 24 – October 8, 2017	Yogyakarta, Indonesia	No guests	Only Lee Kwang-soo and Jeon So-min appeared in the Indonesia section of the episode.
378 – 379	November 26 – December 3, 2017	Darwin, Australia; Queenstown, New Zealand	No guests	Yoo Jae-suk, Ji Suk-jin, Lee Kwang-soo, and Jeon So-min appeared in the Australia section of the episode while Haha, Kim Jong-kook, Song Ji-hyo and Yang Se-chan appeared in the New Zealand section of the episode.
390 – 392	March 4, 2018 – March 18, 2018	Okinawa, Japan; Tsushima Island, Japan; Thailand	Heo Kyung-hwan Lee Sang-yeob Shorry J (Mighty Mouth) Yoo Byung-jae Son Na-eun	Yoo Jae-suk, Ji Suk-jin, Jeon So-min and Heo Kyung-hwan appeared in the Okinawa section of the episodes while Haha, Lee Kwang-soo, Song Ji-hyo and Lee Sang-yeob appeared in the Tsushima Island section of the episodes. Kim Jong-kook, Yang Se-chan, Son Na-eun, Shorry J and Yoo Byung-jae appeared in the Thailand section of the episodes.
399 – 400	May 6, 2018 – May 13, 2018	Hong Kong	Hong Jin-young Kang Han-na Lee Da-hee Lee Sang-yeob	Only Yoo Jae-suk, Jeon So-min, Yang Se-chan and Kang Han-na appeared in the Hong Kong section of the episode.
406 – 408	June 9, 2018 – June 12, 2018	England, UK; Switzerland	Hong Jin-young Kang Han-na Lee Da-hee Lee Sang-yeob	Only Yoo Jae-suk, Ji Suk-jin, Lee Kwang-soo, Jeon So-min, Lee Da-hee and Lee Sang-yeob appeared in the UK section of the episodes. Only Haha, Kim Jong-kook, Song Ji-hyo, Yang Se-chan, Hong Jin-young and Kang Han-na appeared in the Switzerland section of the episodes.
428 – 431	November 26, 2018 – November 27, 2018	Hong Kong	No guests	Only Yoo Jae-suk, Ji Suk-jin and Jeon So-min appeared in the Hong Kong section of the episodes.
650 – 651	April 16, 2023 – April 23, 2023	Metro Manila, Philippines	Manny Pacquiao Ryan Bang	Manny Pacquiao and Ryan Bang appeared as guests in Episode 651 only.
680 – 681	November 19, 2023 – November 26, 2023	Singapore	Hong Jin-ho Shin Ye-eun	—N/a
