= Mission10X =

Indian employment initiative

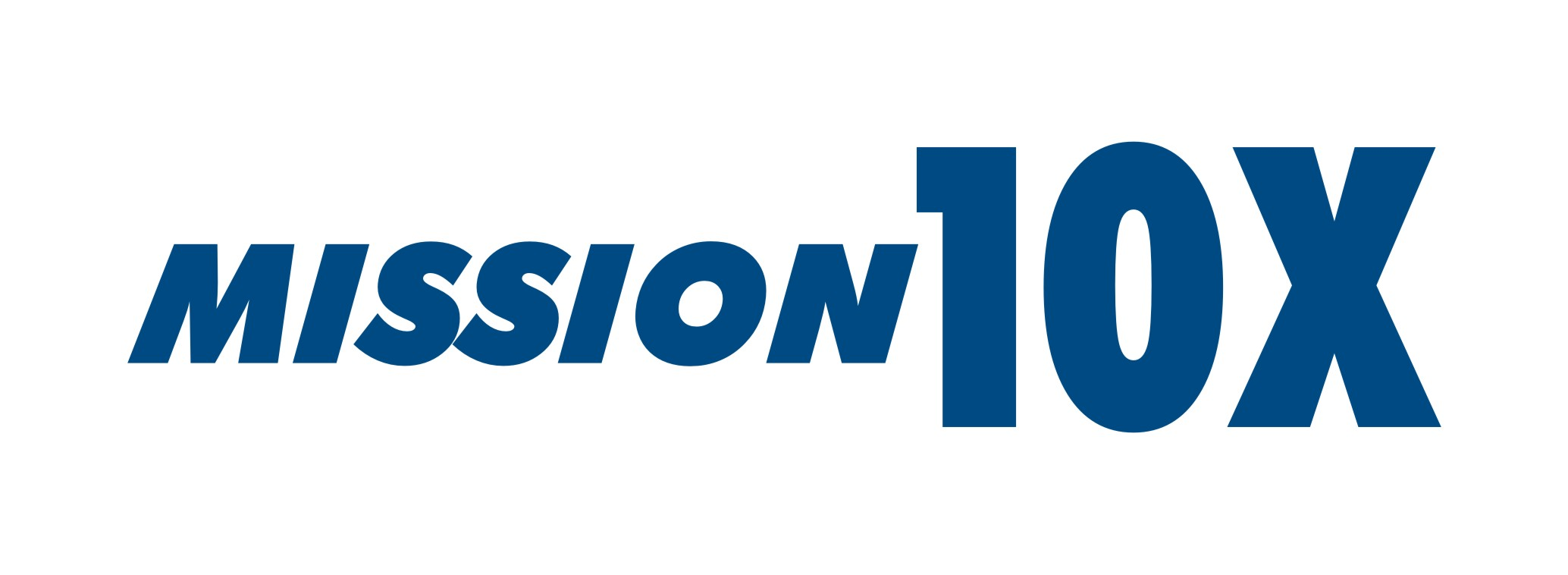
- Type: Not for profit trust of Wipro Limited
- Industry: Engineering
- Founded: 2007
- Defunct: 2012
- Headquarters: India
- Services: Education

Mission10X was a nonprofit trust that was initiated by Wipro Technologies, to enhance the employability skills of fresh graduates in India, and was launched on 5 September 2007, celebrated as Teachers’ Day in India. Mission10X was once a fast-growing academic community of learners and innovators. Mission10X closed its activities in 2012.

== History ==
Mission10X was an initiative started with an aim to increase employability skills in graduates of higher education. Mission10X, was initiated as a part of Wipro's Quantum Innovation project. Mission10X initiative was launched to create a reasonable change in the employability landscape in higher education.

Azim Premji, Chairman, Wipro Limited, launched Mission10X on 5 September 2007, in a gathering of senior academicians from Higher Educational Institutions across India.

Mission10X Faculty Empowerment Workshops were started on 12 November 2007 and they continued until 2012.

== Team ==
The Mission10X team consisted of an advisory board of senior academicians, a core team to set directions, a research team to conceptualize design and delivery of learnings by means of faculty workshops, and they were conducted with the support of academic relationship managers who interacted with academia.

== Mission10X framework ==
The Mission10X Learning Approach (MxLA), was a procedure used in the workshops to empower faculty members with innovative teaching techniques and tools that would enable their learners to:

- Imbibe higher levels of understanding of their courses
- Effectively apply the learnt concepts in practical situations
- Develop key behavioral skills required for employability

MxLA was sensitive to the contemporary intellectual development in the human and social sciences and derived its essence from multiple disciplines, methods and approaches. Amongst many pedagogical and androgogical approaches, the MxLA focused on:

- Benjamin S. Bloom's Taxonomy of educational objectives
- Howard Gardner's Multiple Intelligence Theory

== Workshops ==
Mission10X conducted the following workshops and events:

- Mission10X 5 Day Workshop – 5 full-day workshop, conducted for around 30 faculty members chosen from 3 different institutions. This program was oriented towards building continuous professional development of faculty members from higher education. It was primarily designed to shift the paradigm from teaching to learning and transform the learning cultures in the institutions of higher education.
- Mission10X Advanced Workshop – 2 full-day workshop, conducted for the same group of around 30 faculty members who had earlier attended the 5 full day workshop. This workshop was oriented towards documenting the faculty classroom initiations and also for obtaining international certifications.
- Mission10X Learning Forums – 1 half-day event, organised to facilitate learning culture amongst faculty members where each member could learn from each other.
- Mission10X Academic Leadership Workshop – 2 full-day workshop, organised for academic heads to enhance their leadership and managerial skills.

== Mission10X international certifications ==
During their course of learning, faculty members were able to acquire three certificates that contributed towards their professional development:

- Mission10X Dale Carnegie Certificate in High Impact Teaching Skills
- Cambridge International Certificate for Teachers and Trainers
- Mission10X Certificate in Teaching and Learning

== Affiliations and collaborations ==
Collaborated partners of Mission10X:

- Dale Carnegie Training
- University of Cambridge
- IIT Bombay
- Anna University
- Jawaharlal Nehru Technological University, Kakinada
- Visvesvaraya Technological University
- Rajiv Gandhi Proudyogiki Vishwavidyalaya
- West Bengal University of Technology
- Indian Society for Technical Institution
- International Federation of Engineering Education
- Gautam Buddha Technical University
- Chandigarh University – http://www.cuchd.in/
- Administrative Staff College of India

== Spread ==
During its initial three years (2007–2010), Mission10X was able to reach out to 10,000 faculty members from over 700 higher education institutions across 20 states in India.

== Mission10X Phase II ==
Mission10X Phase II was launched on September 6, 2010. Wipro Chairman Mr. A H Premji and the Union Minister for HRD, Sri Kapil Sibal unveiled the Phase II activities. During Mission10X Phase II (2010–2012):

- 250 Academic Leaders were trained
- 2500 Unified Learning Kits were deployed
- 25000 more higher education faculty members were empowered
