= The World's On Fire =

Studio album by Man with a Mission
- Released: February 10, 2016
- Genres: Nu metal; punk rock; alternative metal; rap rock
- Length: 52:02
- Label: Sony Music Records
- Producers: Man with a Mission; Don Gilmore; Shaun Lopez

Man with a Mission chronology
| Tales of Purefly (2014) | The World's On Fire (2016) | Chasing the Horizon (2018) |

Singles from The World's On Fire
- 1. "Seven Deadly Sins" Released: February 11, 2015; 2. "Out of Control" Released: May 20, 2015; 3. "Raise your flag" Released: October 14, 2015; 4. "Memories" Released: January 27, 2016

Professional ratings
Review scores
| Source | Rating |
|---|---|
| SCMP | 2/5 stars |
| GRIMM Gent | 8/10 |

The World's On Fire (ザ・ワールズ・オン・ファイア) is the fourth studio album by Japanese rock band Man with a Mission, released on February 10, 2016 through Sony Music Records. It peaked at 3rd place on Oricon albums chart and stayed for 43 weeks. The album received Gold certification from the Recording Industry Association of Japan for sales of 100,000.

The single "Out of Control" features guest appearance from Zebrahead and was nominated for the 2015 MTV Video Music Awards Japan for Best Collaboration, losing to Momoiro Clover Z's "Yume no Ukiyo ni Saite Mi na" (featuring Kiss). "Out of Control" was used as ending theme song for the Japanese dub release of Mad Max: Fury Road.

== Track listing ==
CD
| No. | Title | Lyrics | Music | Length |
|---|---|---|---|---|
| 1. | "Survivor^{[A]}" | Kamikaze Boy; Jean-Ken Johnny | Kamikaze Boy; Todd Morse; Kemble Walters | 4:29 |
| 2. | "Waiting for the Moment" | Jean-Ken Johnny | Jean-Ken Johnny | 3:58 |
| 3. | "Dive^{[B]}" | Jean-Ken Johnny | Jean-Ken Johnny | 4:24 |
| 4. | "Raise Your Flag^{[C]}" | Kamikaze Boy; Jean-Ken Johnny | Kamikaze Boy | 4:05 |
| 5. | "Followers" | Jean-Ken Johnny | Jean-Ken Johnny | 4:20 |
| 6. | "The World's On Fire^{[D]}" | Jean-Ken Johnny; Shaun Lopez | Jean-Ken Johnny; Morse; Walters; Lopez | 4:05 |
| 7. | "Give It Away^{[E]}" | Jean-Ken Johnny | Jean-Ken Johnny; Morse; Walters | 3:09 |
| 8. | "Seven Deadly Sins^{[F]}" | Jean-Ken Johnny; Kamikaze Boy | Kamikaze Boy | 3:25 |
| 9. | "Mirror Mirror" | Jean-Ken Johnny | Jean-Ken Johnny; Lopez | 3:24 |
| 10. | "Memories" | Jean-Ken Johnny; Kamikaze Boy | Kamikaze Boy | 4:37 |
| 11. | "Far" | Jean-Ken Johnny | Jean-Ken Johnny; Lopez | 4:06 |
| 12. | "Out of Control^{[G]}" (featuring Zebrahead) | Man With A Mission; Zebrahead | Man With A Mission; Zebrahead | 3:17 |
| 13. | "Wonderlands" (ワンダーランド) | Jean-Ken Johnny | Jean-Ken Johnny | 4:43 |
| Total length: | | | | 52:02 |

== Charts ==
=== Album ===
| Chart (2016) | Peak position |
|---|---|
| Japanese Albums (Oricon) | 3 |

=== Singles ===
| Title | Year | Peak positions | |
| Title | Year | JPN Oricon | JPN Billboard |
|---|---|---|---|
| "Seven Deadly Sins" | 2015 | 2 | 2 |
| "Out of Control" (featuring Zebrahead) | 2015 | 2 | 45 |
| "Raise Your Flag" | 2015 | 3 | 2 |
| "Memories" | 2016 | 17 | 21 |

== Certifications ==
| Region | Certification | Certified units/sales |
|---|---|---|
| Japan (RIAJ) | Gold | 100,000^{^} |
^{^} Shipments figures based on certification alone.

== Awards ==
=== MTV Video Music Awards Japan ===
| Year | Nominee / work | Award | Result |
|---|---|---|---|
| 2015 | "Out of Control" (featuring Zebrahead) | Best Collaboration | Nominated |

== Personnel ==
=== Man with a Mission ===
- Tokyo Tanaka – lead vocals
- Jean-Ken Johnny – electric guitar and co-lead vocals
- Kamikaze Boy – electric bass guitar and backing vocals
- DJ Santa Monica – electronic keyboards and DJing
- Spear Rib – drum kit

== Notes ==
^{A} "Survivor" was chosen by Capcom to be the image song for the video game Street Fighter V.
^{B} "Dive" was used as the theme song for Shinjuku Swan.
^{C} "Raise Your Flag" was featured as the opening song for the anime Mobile Suit Gundam: Iron-Blooded Orphans.
^{D} "The World's On Fire" was used on BMW Mini Clean Diesel commercial in Japan.

^{E} "Give It Away" was used as the image song for Point Break (X-ミッション X-Mission).
^{F} "Seven Deadly Sins" was featured as the opening song for the anime The Seven Deadly Sins.
^{G} "Out of Control" was chosen as the ending theme song for the Japanese dub release of Mad Max: Fury Road.
