= Run Wild. Live Free. Love Strong. =

Studio album by For King & Country
- Released: September 16, 2014
- Genre: Contemporary Christian music; Christian rock; indie rock; pop rock
- Length: 55:24
- Label: Fervent, Word
- Producer: for King & Country; Ben Glover; Matt Hales; Seth Mosley; Tedd Tjornhom

For King & Country chronology
Crave (2012)	Run Wild. Live Free. Love Strong. (2014)	Christmas: Live from Phoenix (2017)

Run Wild. Live Free. Love Strong. is the second album from for King & Country. Fervent Records alongside Word Records released the project on September 16, 2014. For King & Country worked with producers Ben Glover, Matt Hales, Seth Mosley, and Tedd Tjornhom in the creation of this album. 5 tracks from the album became radio singles including "Fix My Eyes", "Shoulders", "It's Not Over Yet", "Priceless", and "O God Forgive Us". The new version of the last song was originally not the one featured on the album as it was a new recording that features Christian hip hop and rap artist KB, however it was subsequently added to the album.

== Reception ==
Professional ratings
Review scores
Source	Rating
365 Days of Inspiring Media	4.5/5 stars
AllMusic	3/5 stars
CCM Magazine	4/5 stars
Christian Music Review	4.3/5
Christian Review Magazine	5/5 stars
Cross Rhythms	10/10 squares
Jesus Freak Hideout	4/5 stars
Jesus Wired	10/10 stars
Louder Than the Music	5/5 stars
New Release Tuesday	5/5 stars

Run Wild. Live Free. Love Strong. was met with widespread critical acclaim among Christian music publications. Signaling in a four star out of five review by CCM Magazine, Matt Conner recognizes, "Capitalizing on that momentum, Run Wild. Live Free. Love Strong. doesn’t disappoint."" Michael Weaver, agrees it is a four-star album from Jesus Freak Hideout, responding, "for King & Country have offered up a triumphant return with Run Wild. Live Free. Love Strong.... Run Wild. Live Free. Love Strong. hits all the marks and leaves very little you can't be satisfied with. Without a doubt, Joel and Luke have avoided any semblance of a sophomore slump. Contemporary and pop fans alike should find enjoyment in this record, but it honestly reaches further than that." Indicating in a ten out of ten review from Cross Rhythms, Stephen Curry replies, "This new offering covers topics from recovering from past mistakes, having big dreams, keeping our allegiance to Christ and our importance to God and they are all delivered with stunning energy and catchy melodies... This duo have crafted a masterful pop album." Marcus Hathcock, agrees it is a perfect five out of five stars by New Release Tuesday, declaring, "Album of the year. Incredible songwriting. Raw-yet-polished, painful-but-victorious, resting-but-driven anthems that are single handedly moving Christian music forward. Rare, seamless marriage of conventional instruments and electronic elements that don't come off as trend-following or out of place." Awarding the album four and a half stars at 365 Days of Inspiring Media, Emily Kjonaas writes, "RUN WILD. LIVE FREE. LOVE STRONG., they prove that they are a force to be reckoned with." Aubrey Wickenheiser, rating the album five stars for Louder Than the Music, says, "they've really settled into their identity as artists." Rating the album a 4.3 out of five at Christian Music Review, Jay Heilman writes, "Run Wild. Live Free. Love Strong. will be one of those records that you will want to reach for not only for entertainment, but encouragement from the Word in the form of song." Jessica Morris, awarding the album ten stars for Jesus Wired, says, "Musically, this album is bold enough to weave different sounds and genres together in a unique and beautiful way; and lyrically it communicates the simple truths of humanity: we hurt, but there is hope in Christ." Writing a review for Christian Review Magazine, Leah St. John rating the album five stars describes, "RUN WILD. LIVE FREE. LOVE STRONG is sure capture and impress a large audience with its wonderful lyrics, vocals, and musical style."

Run Wild. Live Free. Love Strong. won the Best Contemporary Christian Music Album at the 57th Annual Grammy Awards.

== Track listing ==
Run Wild. Live Free. Love Strong. track listing
No.	Title	Writer(s)	Length
1.	"Run Wild" (featuring Andy Mineo)	Matt Hales, Andy Mineo, Joel Smallbone, Luke Smallbone, Tedd Tjornhom	4:00
2.	"Prelude (Fix My Eyes)"		0:39
3.	"Fix My Eyes"	Seth Mosley, Joel Smallbone, Luke Smallbone	3:35
4.	"To the Dreamers"	Matt Hales, Joel Smallbone, Luke Smallbone	3:34
5.	"Shoulders"	Ben Glover, Joel Smallbone, Luke Smallbone, Tedd Tjornhom	5:04
6.	"No Turning Back"	Seth Mosley, Joel Smallbone, Luke Smallbone	4:04
7.	"Without You" (featuring Courtney)	Benjamin Backus, Mark Campbell, Matt Hales, Timmy Jones, Blake Kanicka, Stephen Lynch, Joel Smallbone, Luke Smallbone	4:52
8.	"Long Live"	Blair Daly, Seth Mosley, Joel Smallbone, Luke Smallbone	3:52
9.	"Steady"	Ben Glover, Joel Smallbone, Luke Smallbone, Tedd Tjornhom	3:27
10.	"Already Home"	Matt Hales, Joel Smallbone, Luke Smallbone	4:18
11.	"This Is Love"	Brian Howes, Joel Smallbone, Luke Smallbone, Tedd Tjornhom	4:22
12.	"Matter"	Seth Mosley, Joel Smallbone, Luke Smallbone	3:51
13.	"It's Not Over Yet"	Ben Glover, Kyle Rictor, Joel Smallbone, Luke Smallbone, Tedd Tjornhom	4:00
14.	"O God Forgive Us"	Seth Mosley, Joel Smallbone, Luke Smallbone	5:49
Total length:			55:24

Spotify bonus track
No.	Title	Writer(s)	Length
15.	"Wholehearted"	Matt Hales, Joel Smallbone, Luke Smallbone	3:52
Total length:			59:16

Note

- An anniversary, deluxe edition was released in 2015 that replaced "It's Not Over Yet" with "Its Not Over Yet (The Encore)" and replaced "O God Forgive" with a version of the song featuring KB. The new tracks included are "Priceless", "Ceasefire", and "Wholehearted".

== Charts ==
=== Weekly charts ===
2014 weekly chart performance for Run Wild. Live Free. Love Strong.
Chart (2014)	Peak position
US Billboard 200	13
US Top Christian Albums (Billboard)	2

2018 weekly chart performance for Run Wild. Live Free. Love Strong.
Chart (2018)	Peak position
US Independent Albums (Billboard)	35

=== Decade-end charts ===
Decade-end chart performance for Run Wild. Live Free. Love Strong.
Chart (2010s)	Position
US Christian Albums (Billboard)	8

== Certifications ==
Certifications for Run Wild. Live Free. Love Strong.
Region	Certification	Certified units/sales
United States (RIAA)	Gold	500,000^{‡}
^{‡} Sales+streaming figures based on certification alone.
