= The Proof of Your Love =

- The monologue remix cover

Single by For King & Country

from the album Crave
- Released: 28 February 2012
- Recorded: 2011–2012
- Genre: Contemporary Christian, alternative rock
- Length: 3:17
- Label: Warner Music Group
- Songwriters: Ben Glover; Jonathan Lee; Joel Smallbone; Luke Smallbone; Fred Williams

For King & Country singles chronology
"Busted Heart (Hold On to Me)" (2011)	"The Proof of Your Love" (2012)	"Baby Boy" (2012)

"The Proof of Your Love" is a song by Christian alternative rock duo For King & Country, released as the second single from their debut album Crave. It was released as a single on 28 February 2012, and a monologue remix was released on 12 June.

== Composition ==
The song is a lyrical paraphrase of 1 Corinthians 13, which is a passage that speaks of love. The duo shared their personal stories with New Release Tuesday in July 2012. Luke explained, "Joel came to me in the studio that day and told me he wanted to write something that would gently nudge and encourage people and at the same time challenge them. That's a very difficult line to balance. People don't want to be challenged too much and be turned away. When we were looking at the Bible passage 1 Corinthians 13, we knew there was something significant that we hadn't written about. We decided to put those words into this song. That's how the song came to be." Joel also explained, "Adding to that, there's a powerful message in proclaiming those truths from God's Word first. The lyrics have me singing, "If I sing, but don't have love, I waste my breath with every song." Rather than have this be a judgment to listeners, it's time for me to proclaim it. Then you can make it your own and put your tent pegs in the ground and announce that you are standing by those same words."

A monologue remix entitled The Proof of Your Love: The Monologue Mix was released on 12 June 2012. The single includes a monologue of Joel reciting the first seven verses of 1 Corinthians 13. as the bridge instead of the guitar riff on the album version.

A third version of the song featuring Rebecca St. James is featured on the band's third album entitled Christmas: Live from Phoenix.

== Chart performance ==
The song peaked at number 8 on Billboard for 25 weeks.

Chart performance for "The Proof of Your Love"
Chart (2012)	Peak position
US Hot Christian Songs (Billboard)	8

== Certifications ==
Certifications for "The Proof of Your Love"
Region	Certification	Certified units/sales
United States (RIAA)	Platinum	1,000,000^{‡}
^{‡} Sales+streaming figures based on certification alone.
