= Busted Heart (Hold On to Me) =

Single by For King & Country

from the album Crave
- Released: 20 September 2011
- Recorded: 2011
- Genre: CCM
- Length: 3:19
- Label: Warner Music Group
- Songwriters: Ben Glover, Joel Smallbone, Luke Smallbone, Jenna Torres

For King & Country singles chronology
"Busted Heart (Hold On to Me)" (2011)	"The Proof of Your Love" (2012)

"Busted Heart (Hold On to Me)" is a song by Christian alternative rock duo For King & Country. It was released on 20 September 2011 off their EP For King & Country: The EP and was the first single off their debut album Crave. The song reached No. 3 on the Christian Songs chart.

== Composition ==
The duo described the song as "really a universal cry of humanity for something greater than ourselves...[People think they've] got it all sorted out, and life will deal you those blows. This song is that cry saying, 'God, Father, hold onto me, don't let me lose my way.'" They said the song was inspired by Matthew 11:29-30, which says, "Take My yoke upon you and learn from Me, for I am gentle and lowly in heart, and you will find rest for your souls. For My yoke is easy and My burden is light." Luke Smallbone said, "When we were writing this song, that Matthew 11 passage came to mind. When we go through life it's so hectic and get beaten down and we go through so many trials. The truth is that we have a Father who is waiting to hold onto us. He's someone we can rest in and He gives us that perfect peace. That's what I love about the song, the verses are talking about real life. The chorus is just crying out to God. There comes those defining moments in each of our lives where we so severely need someone to hold on to us. It seems we are all, in different ways, shapes and forms, busted to some degree. This song is an honest confession: I can’t do this thing called life on my own. I need something, or more specifically, someone greater than myself to hold on to me."

== Charts ==
=== Weekly charts ===
Chart (2011–12)	Peak position
US Christian Airplay (Billboard)	3
US Hot Christian Songs (Billboard)	3
US Christian AC (Billboard)	5

=== Year-end charts ===
Chart (2012)	Peak position
US Christian Songs (Billboard)	26
