= Set the World on Fire =

Set the World on Fire may refer to:

== Albums ==
- Set the World on Fire (Annihilator album) or the title song, 1993
- Set the World on Fire (Black Veil Brides album) or the title song, 2011
- Set the World on Fire (Gioeli-Castronovo album) or the title song, 2018
- Set the World on Fire, by Liar, or the title song, 1978

== Songs ==
- "Set the World on Fire" (E-Type song), 1994
- "Set the World on Fire" (Luca Hänni song), 2015
- "Set the World on Fire", by Britt Nicole from Say It, 2007
- "Set the World on Fire", by Lovebites from Electric Pentagram, 2020
- "Set the World on Fire", by Serenity from The Last Knight, 2020
- "Set the World on Fire (The Lie of Lies)", by Symphony X from Paradise Lost, 2007

== See also ==
- Set the World on Fire Tour, a 2013 concert tour by Alicia Keys
- "I Don't Want to Set the World on Fire", a 1938 song recorded by several performers
- "Set the World Afire", a song by Megadeth from So Far, So Good... So What!, 1988
- "Set this World on Fire", a song by the Janoskians, 2012
