= World on Fire (For King & Country and Taylor Hill song) =

Single by For King & Country and Taylor Hill

from the album The Most Beautiful Colours
- Released: 2 October 2025
- Genre: Christian; pop rock
- Length: 3:17
- Label: Curb Records
- Songwriters: Joel Smallbone; Luke Smallbone; Taylor Hill; Tedd Tjornhom
- Producers: Joel Smallbone; Luke Smallbone; Taylor Hill; Tedd Tjornhom

For King & Country singles chronology
"Silent Night" (rewrapped) (2024)	"World on Fire" (2025)	"Ever & Ever Before" (2026)

Taylor Hill singles chronology
"This Won't Take My Praise" (2025)	"World on Fire" (2025)	"Hello" (2025)

Music video
- "World on Fire" on YouTube

"World on Fire" is a song by the Australian Christian pop duo For King & Country featuring multi-genre musician Taylor Hill. The song was released on Curb Records, and impacted Christian radio in the United Kingdom, United States, and Australia, as the lead single to the band's fifth studio album. It was first released to Christian radio in the United States on 2 October 2025, and to digital download and streaming formats on 3 October 2025.

The song was both written and produced by For King & Country members Joel and Luke Smallbone, in addition to Taylor Hill and Tedd Tjornhom. In Australia, "World on Fire" led the TCM Christian Songs chart; in the United Kingdom, it led the Cross Rhythms Christian Songs chart; in the United States it reached number 16 on the Billboard Hot Christian Songs chart. At the 2025 New Release Today (NRT) We Love Awards, the song received nominations in three categories, including Song of the Year, Pop Song of the Year, and Music Video of the Year.

== Release and promotion ==
Before its first initial release, "World on Fire" was announced for upcoming release. It was first released to K-Love radio stations in the United States, before appearing to digital download and streaming services. With the digital and streaming release, the song was supported by a music video, which was premiered to YouTube. With the song's announcement, it was also announced that a full album would be released in 2026.

== Writing and development ==
=== Lyrics and meaning ===
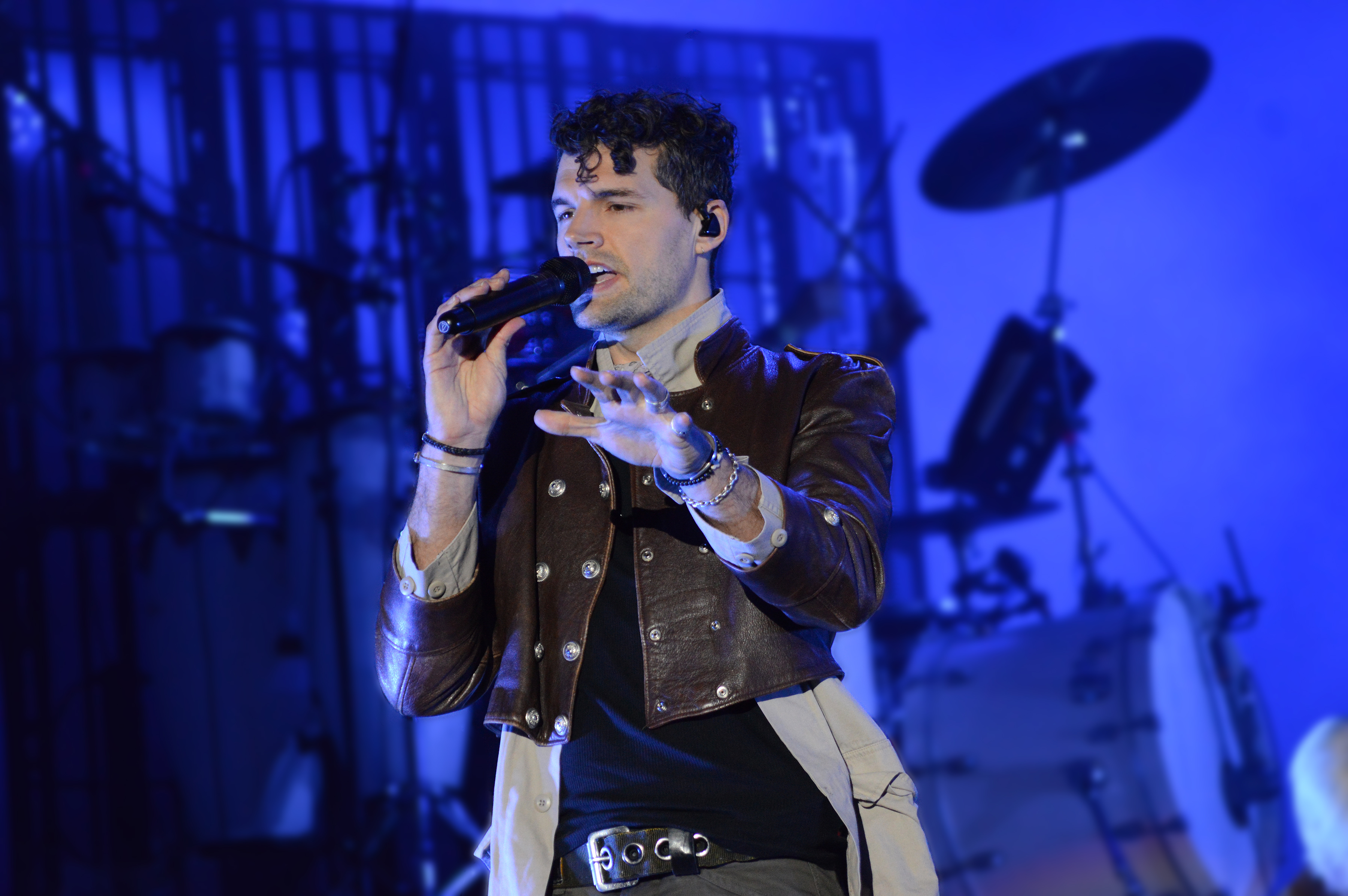
Joel Smallbone, who wrote, produced, and recorded vocals for "World on Fire"

In a "story behind the song" video, Joel Smallbone noted that the title has a double meaning. He spoke, explaining that:

There's a lot going on in the world right now, and one could even say the world has been on fire. But interestingly enough about this song, this is flipping the phrase on its head. This really represents being bold, being brave, being powerful, being optimistic, being hopeful—because there's so much to live for. God has given so much, and there's opportunity and beauty. Stepping out into that bright, bold, beautiful future is really what this song represents for us.

In the same video, Hill explained that his contribution came from inspiration by his grandmother, saying:

My grandmother was always such a stickler for taking the light that God put within us and making a lasting impact with other people that we come in contact with. Being that city on a hill that everybody can see—and boasting on who God has called us to be—actually makes a lasting impact.

"World on Fire" was also partially inspired by a quote from John Wesley, in which he claims, "People don't come to watch me preach. They come to watch me burn." For King & Country described "World on Fire" as the first in a "new season of passion and purpose" for the band. The song was both written and produced by Luke and Joel Smallbone, Hill, and Tjornhom, while Eli Heissler and Rob Kinelski mixed and Dave Kutch mastered.

=== Composition ===
CCM Magazine noted that "World on Fire" contains "tribal beats", "a multicultural choir", and "a massive chorus primed for their electric live show." The song begins with Joel and Luke Smallbone performing the majority of the song, while Hill performs the second verse. At live performances, The Christian Post observed that the band would perform the song accompanied by twenty-foot high flames on stage. The song marked For King & Country's first original material to be released following a hiatus of over two years. The group had ceased touring and releasing music for a time, with the goal to "afford them the chance to reflect upon where the last 15 years have taken them and to allow God to breathe new vision into their hearts." The Christian Beat described "World on Fire" as containing "cinematic sound and powerful storytelling."

The song contains a sample drawn from the lullaby "This Little Light of Mine". "World on Fire" is in the key of A, with a speed of 130 beats per minute and a time signature of 4/4. "World on Fire" demonstrates the genres of pop rock and Contemporary Christian music.

== Music video ==
The music video for the song begins by depicting various people participating in everyday activities, before leaving their things and running. The scene then changes to show a boy finding and catching a long cord, which is hanging from the sky. The scene changes once again to show people in the back of a truck singing and dancing. The camera returns to show the boy with the cord. He is told by his mother to "let his light shine," prompting him to plug the cord into an outlet. It causes lights to appear, and begins a large celebration among many people. The video ends with the text, "Introduces Yoneury – A Compassion Child from the Dominican Republic."

The music video for "World on Fire" was premiered to YouTube on 3 October 2025. Godtube observed that it "highlights the importance of sharing the love of Jesus to everyone around the world." The video was filmed in the Dominican Republic. It was directed by Kadin Tooley and produced by Katie Babbage, Patrick Tohill, and Crashbang.

== Reception ==
=== Commercial ===
"World on Fire" debuted at number 16 on the Billboard Hot Christian Songs in the chart week dated for 18 October 2025, supportively appearing at number 5 on the Christian Digital Song Sales. It later peaked at number 14 on the Christian Airplay chart and number 11 on the Christian Adult Contemporary chart. In the United Kingdom, it debuted leading the Cross Rhythms Christian Songs chart, and in Australia, it led the Today's Christian Music (TCM) Christian Songs chart following a three-frame climb to the peak position.

The song was quickly added to a significant number of Christian radio stations, and within two weeks, had already become the most added single to Christian radio throughout 2025.

=== Accolades ===
At the fourteenth annual New Release Today We Love Awards, "World on Fire" received three nominations, including Song of the Year, Pop Song of the Year, and Music Video of the Year. The results are scheduled for announcement on 22 March 2026.

Year	Organization	Category	Result	Ref.
2025	We Love Awards	Song of the Year	Nominated	
2025	We Love Awards	Pop Song of the Year	Nominated	
2025	We Love Awards	Music Video of the Year	Nominated	
2026	CMAA	Australian Song of the Year	Pending	
2026	Dove Awards	Short Form Music Video of the Year (Concept)	Pending	

== Personnel ==
Credits adapted from Tidal Music.

=== Lead musicians ===
- Joel Smallbone – producer, writer, background vocals, lead vocals
- Luke Smallbone – producer, writer, background vocals, lead vocals
- Taylor Hill – producer, writer, background vocals, bass, drums, guitar, keyboard, programmer, lead vocals

=== Additional musicians ===
- Akil Thompson – electric guitar
- Bethany Cruz – background vocals
- Caleb Dukes – keyboard
- Danny Lopez – bass, keyboard
- Javier Solis – percussion
- Paul Mayberry – drums
- Vince DiCarlo – acoustic guitar, bass

=== Technical ===
- Caleb Dukes – editor, programmer, recording engineer
- Craig White – recording engineer
- Dave Kutch – masterer
- Danny Lopez – programmer
- David Bates – recording engineer
- Diana Wohl – artists and repertoire
- Eli Heissler – mixer
- Jake Halm – editor, programmer, recording engineer
- Joseph Prielozny – artists and repertoire
- Rob Kinelski – mixer
- Tedd Tjornhom – producer, writer, editor, keyboard, programmer, recording engineer
- Wills Kookogey – recording engineer

== Charts ==
Chart performance for "World on Fire"
Chart (2025–2026)	Peak position
Australian Christian Songs (TCM)	1
New Zealand Most Added (RadioScope)	29
UK Christian Songs (Cross Rhythms)	1
US Adult Pop Airplay (Billboard)	19
US Christian Adult Contemporary (Billboard)	3
US Christian Airplay (Billboard)	2
US Digital Song Sales (Billboard)	17
US Hot Christian Songs (Billboard)	12

== Release history ==
Release history and formats for "World on Fire"
Region	Date	Format(s)	Label(s)	Ref.
United States	2 October 2025	Christian radio	Curb Records	
Various	3 October 2025	Digital download; streaming	Curb Records	
