= Strange and Beautiful =

Strange and Beautiful may refer to:

- Strange and Beautiful (Aqualung album), 2005
  - "Strange & Beautiful (I'll Put a Spell on You)", a song by Aqualung from Aqualung, 2002
- Strange and Beautiful (Crimson Glory album), 1991
