= Still Life (Aqualung album) =

Studio album by Aqualung
- Released: 27 October 2003
- Genre: Pop rock
- Length: 43:43
- Label: B-Unique
- Producer: Aqualung (Matt Hales), Jacknife Lee

Aqualung chronology
Aqualung (2002)	Still Life (2003)	Strange and Beautiful (2005)

Professional ratings
Review scores
Source	Rating
Allmusic	link

Still Life is the second album by Aqualung, released on 27 October 2003 to critical acclaim. The album featured a more expansive, full band sound than the previous eponymous album. The album reached number 80 on the UK albums chart.

The first single from the album was "Brighter than Sunshine", released on 13 October 2003 and reached #37 on the UK singles chart. The second single was "Easier to Lie", released on 13 March 2004 and reached number 60 in the UK singles chart with televisual advertising.

"Brighter than Sunshine" was featured on the original soundtrack of the 2005 film A Lot Like Love. Also, the song "Left Behind" is featured in several commercials for the American automobile marquee Chrysler.

== Track listing ==
1. "Brighter Than Sunshine" (Matt Hales/Kim Oliver/Ben Hales) – 4:02
2. "Left Behind" (M. Hales/B. Hales) – 3:45
3. "You Turn Me Around" (M. Hales) – 4:28
4. "Easier to Lie" (M. Hales/K. Oliver) – 3:15
5. "Another Little Hole" (M. Hales) – 5:25
6. "7 Keys" (M. Hales/K. Oliver) – 5:17
7. "Extra Ordinary Thing" (M. Hales) – 3:16
8. "Breaking My Heart Again" (M. Hales/K. Oliver) – 3:27
9. "Take Me Home" (M. Hales/K. Oliver) – 5:43
10. "Good Goodnight" (M. Hales/B. Hales) – 4:59
