= Breaking Dawn soundtrack =

Breaking Dawn soundtrack may refer to:

- The Twilight Saga: Breaking Dawn – Part 1 (soundtrack), (2011)
- The Twilight Saga: Breaking Dawn – Part 2 (soundtrack), (2012)
