= Aqualung (musician) =

English musician, songwriter and producer

Matt Hales
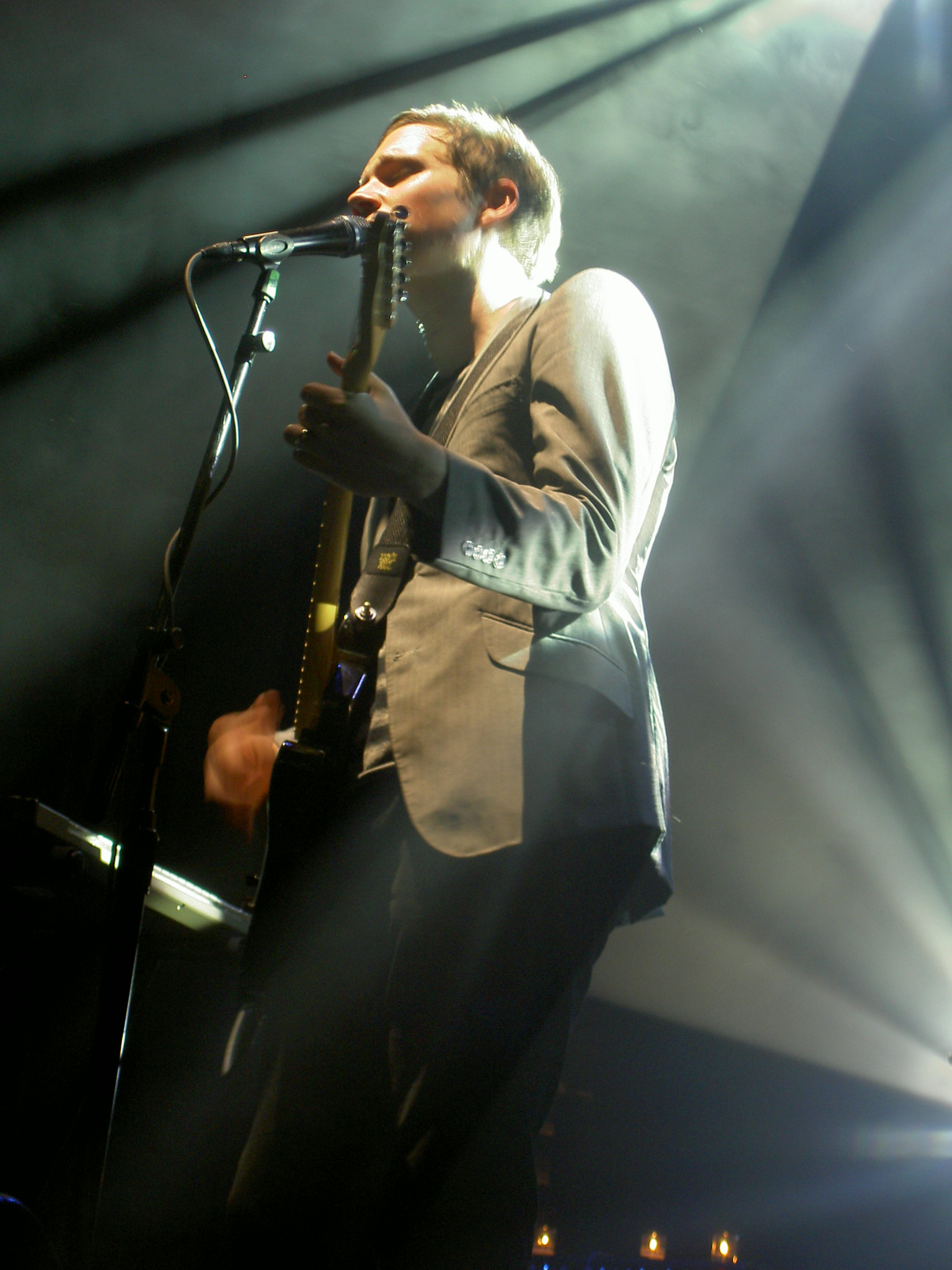
- Aqualung in 2015

Background information
- Also known as: Matt Hales
- Born: Matthew Nicholas Hales; 17 January 1972 (age 54)
- Origin: Southampton, England
- Genres: Alternative rock, soul, electronic
- Occupations: Musician, singer, songwriter, record producer
- Instruments: Vocals, guitar, piano
- Years active: 1990–present
- Labels: Verve Forecast, Columbia, B-Unique
- Website: aqualung.net

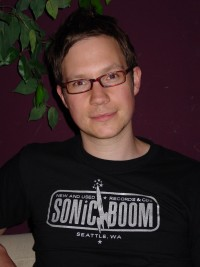
Hales in 2005

Matthew Nicholas Hales (born 17 January 1972) is an English singer, songwriter, musician and record producer who has been performing professionally under the name Aqualung since the early 2000s. Aqualung is best known in the UK for his song "Strange and Beautiful", which was featured on a television advertisement for the new Volkswagen Beetle during the summer of 2002 and went on to become a top 10 hit on the UK Singles Chart later that year. In the United States, Aqualung is also known for the song "Brighter Than Sunshine", which had considerable airplay and was used in the film A Lot Like Love and various television spots. Hales has released seven albums as Aqualung. The most recent, Dead Letters, appeared in 2022.

As a songwriter and record producer, Hales has collaborated with Lianne La Havas, Bat for Lashes, Tom Chaplin, Mika, Daniel Wilson, Kina Grannis, Andreya Triana, the Fray, Kwabs, Jason Mraz, Reignwolf, Sara Bareilles, Jacob Banks, Paloma Faith, Disclosure, Alex Clare, Mansionair, Mikky Ekko, For King & Country and many others.

Hales' work has earned him various awards and nominations, including two Grammy and three Ivor Novello nominations.

== Life and career ==
=== Early life ===
Hales grew up in Southampton, where his parents ran an independent record shop. He aspired to be a musician from an early age, writing songs using the family piano when he was just 4 years old. When he was 16, Hales was awarded a scholarship to study music composition at Winchester College. Within a year, he wrote his first symphony titled "Life Cycle", and formed his first band, which carried several different names during its lifespan. In the spring of 1990, the band (known at the time as Mecano Pig) produced their debut self-titled album, but broke up soon afterwards. That same year, Hales moved to London to study music at City University, and in 1992 formed a new band with his brother Ben called Gravel Monsters.

=== RUTH / the 45s ===
Gravel Monsters became a quartet that featured Matt & Ben Hales, Matt Vincent-Brown, and Stephen Cousins. The band's name was changed to RUTH in 1992, and although it enjoyed a minor hit in 1997 ("I Don't Know") which earned them a loyal fan base, the indie rock quartet failed to find commercial success in their seven years together. Arc Records released RUTH's debut album Harrison in 1999. After the band parted ways with Arc Records in the Summer of 2000, they renamed themselves the 45s and signed a short-term contract with Mercury Records (part of the Universal Music Group). Despite releasing two well-received singles, the label declined to renew the band's contract in March 2002, leading the band to split up. It was at this moment that Matt Hales began to concentrate on a solo project that he would call Aqualung. In 2003, a double CD, Donut (A Collection of Songs for Fellow Appreciators of RUTH) was compiled by the bands's former guitarist Ben Hales and independently released on the Vanity Press label. It featured re-mastered studio, demo and live tracks on one CD and three promo videos on a second CD.

=== Aqualung ===
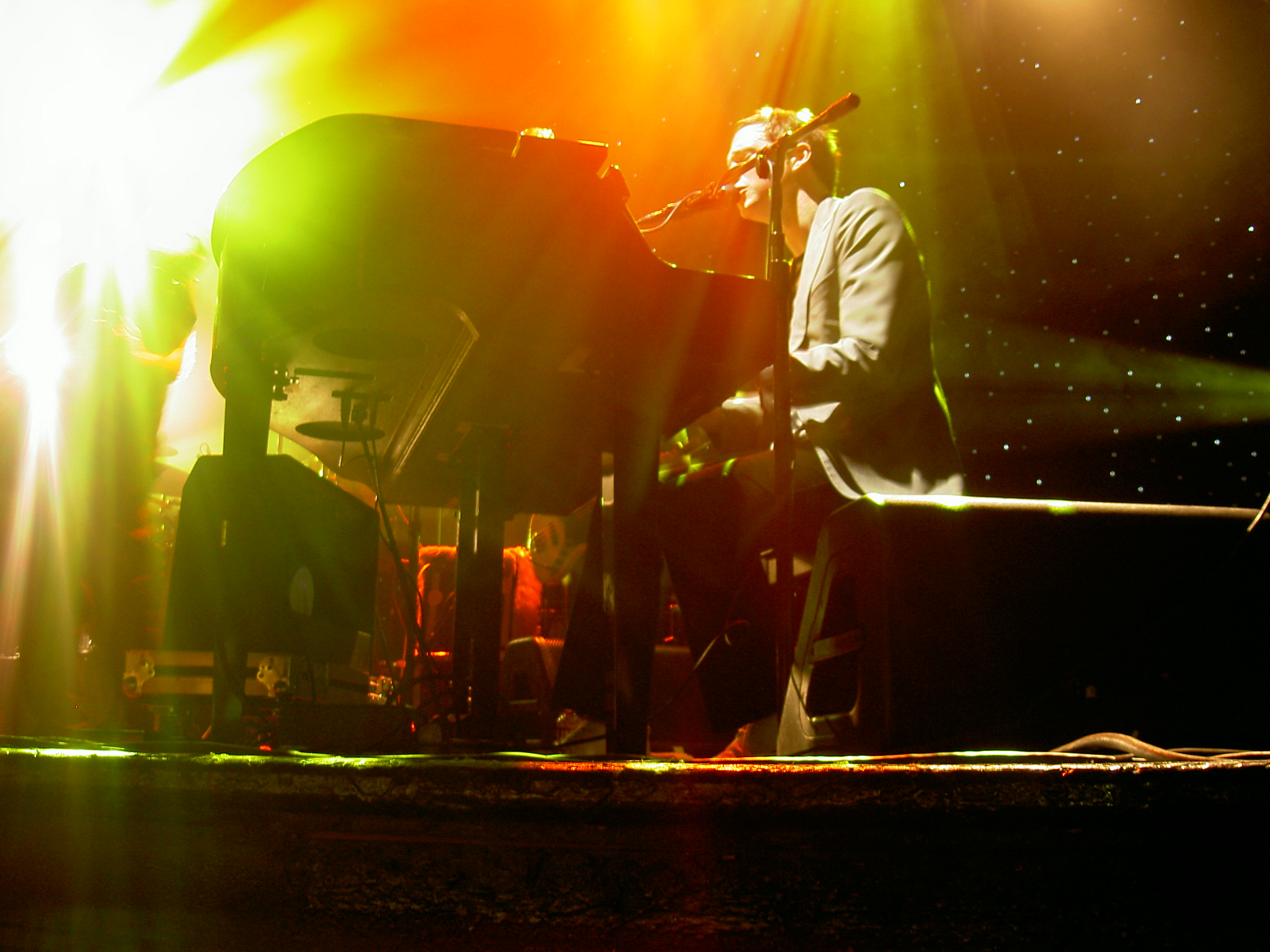
Aqualung in 2015

Almost immediately after the 45s split, Aqualung's debut single "Strange and Beautiful (I'll Put a Spell on You)" gained popularity when it was used as the soundtrack on a television commercial for the new Volkswagen Beetle. It was released as a single on B-Unique Records in September 2002, and reached No. 7 on the UK Singles Chart. Later that month, B-Unique released the eponymous debut album Aqualung, which according to the sleeve notes was recorded entirely in Hales' hallway. It peaked at No. 15 on the UK Albums Chart, and achieved gold status before the year's end. The album's second single, "Good Times Gonna Come" was released on 2 December 2002. It was featured on the British television show Skins, and reached No. 71 on the UK Singles Chart. Several singles followed into the next year, as did Aqualung's second album Still Life, which spawned the single "Brighter Than Sunshine". The song attracted the attention of film and television music supervisors in both Europe and North America, and was featured in the television show CSI: Crime Scene Investigation and the motion picture A Lot Like Love. "Brighter Than Sunshine" enjoyed Top 40 airplay success in the United States, leading Aqualung to a worldwide recording contract with Columbia Records in 2005, and the US release of Strange and Beautiful, a compilation of tracks from his first two UK albums. It reached No. 3 on the Billboard Top Heatseekers chart, eventually selling more than 250,000 copies in the US. Throughout the mid and late 2000s, Aqualung's music was used in television shows such as Grey's Anatomy, The O.C., CSI: Miami, Gossip Girl, Cold Case, Scrubs, One Tree Hill, Eli Stone, and Brothers and Sisters.

Hales and his touring band spent the next two years performing throughout North America, participating in the Hotel Cafe Tour, which also featured Cary Brothers, Meiko, Greg Laswell, Tom McRae, Joe Purdy, and Jim Bianco. While on the road, Hales would routinely switch up the Aqualung show with different musicians, settings, and approaches. The diverse elements he explored during these tours (including the use of an echo device called the Memory Man) subsequently drove the creative process behind what would become Aqualung's next album, Memory Man. It was released in March 2007, and the liner notes credit Hales with playing the following instruments: piano, Fender Rhodes, glockenspiel, electric guitar, Stairwell Drums, harmonium, Moog bass and vocoder. Hales completed his first UK tour since his debut album was released, and concluded the run at the newly re-opened Tabernacle, Notting Hill.

2008 brought the release of Words and Music, Hales' first album for Verve Forecast Records. It featured acoustic versions of two songs from his debut album Aqualung, as well as new songs written in a similar style. In 2010, Hales moved to Los Angeles, to begin the production of his sixth studio album titled Magnetic North. In reference to the album on his Facebook page, Hales said, "It's hard to describe. It's like 12 kids who you would never guess were in the same family until you hear them speaking." The album's first single "Fingertip" was released on 2 March 2010, and reviews of Magnetic North make reference to the indication of Los Angeles' influence on Hales as a writer, with songs containing words like "California", "Sundowning", and "Hummingbird", which were not used prior to his moving Stateside. In 2013, Hales announced on his Facebook page that he had begun work on a new Aqualung album. Also in 2013, Aqualung was featured on the song "Surrounded" on the album A Song Across Wires by EDM artist BT.

=== Songwriter and producer ===
As early as 2004, Hales began collaborating with other artists as a songwriter and producer. He co-wrote "UR" by Tiësto which featured his lead vocal, and was released as a single and featured on the album Just Be. He worked with Leona Lewis on her album Echo in 2009, and in 2010 he co-wrote songs appearing on albums by Brooke Fraser, Christophe Willem, and Boyzone.

After co-writing and producing the song "Pick Up Your Tricks" with Australian pop rock band Amy Meredith in 2011, Hales wrote and produced "Cold" which featured himself and Lucy Schwartz and appeared on The Twilight Saga: Breaking Dawn – Part 1 soundtrack, which sold more than 500,000 copies in the United States.

2012 proved to be the breakout year for Hales in the recording studio. He co-wrote and produced Is Your Love Big Enough? by British singer/songwriter Lianne La Havas. It debuted at No. 4 on the UK Albums Chart, was named iTunes UK album of the year, and was nominated at the 2012 Barclaycard Mercury Prize. In addition to this, Hales co-wrote "Everything Is Sound" on Jason Mraz's Grammy nominated album Love Is a Four Letter Word, and worked with Paloma Faith on the single "Just Be" from her album Fall to Grace. He also co-wrote and produced Diane Birch's single "Unfucked", and the single "Same Heart (feat. Tom Chaplin)" by Laura Jansen. Hales has recently spent time in the studio collaborating with Christina Perri, the Fray, Sara Bareilles, Birdie, Alex Clare, Katharine McPhee, Ginny Blackmore, Kina Grannis, Matt Nathanson, among others.

The 2022 release of the Dead Letters studio album followed a move from Los Angeles back to the United Kingdom, where Hales was reunited with his childhood piano.

== Discography ==
=== Aqualung ===
==== Studio albums ====
Album details	Peak chart position			
Album details	UK	GRE	SCO	US
Aqualung: Released: 30 September 2002; Label: B-Unique; Formats: CD, digital download	15	—	14	—
Still Life: Released : 27 October 2003; Label: B-Unique; Formats: CD, digital download	80	—	78	—
Memory Man: Released: 13 March 2007; Label: Columbia; Formats: CD, digital download	—	—	—	88
Words and Music: Released : 7 October 2008; Label: Verve Forecast; Format: CD	—	—	—	—
Magnetic North: Released : 20 April 2010; Label: Verve Forecast, Fulfill; Formats: CD, digital download	—	46	—	—
10 Futures: Released : 18 January 2015; Label: Golden Section; Formats: CD, LP, digital download	—	—	—	—
Dead Letters: Released : 28 October 2022; Label: Okey-Donkey; Formats: CD, LP, digital download	—	—	—	—

==== Compilation albums ====
Album details	Peak chart position
Album details	US
B-Sides Volume 1: Released: 2004; Label: www.aqualung.net; Format: CD	—
Remixes Volume 1: Released: 2004; Label: www.aqualung.net; Format: CD	—
Strange and Beautiful: Released: 22 March 2005; Label: Columbia; Format: CD	108

==== Extended plays ====
Album details
If I Fall/Live at the Scala
- Released: 2003
- Label: B-Unique
- Format: Double CD
Deep Blue
- Released: 2005
- Label: DefSTAR
- Format: CD with DVD
Still Life 1
- Released: 1 March 2005
- Label: Columbia
- Format: Digital download
Exclusive iTunes EP
- Released: 16 August 2005
- Label: Columbia
- Format: Digital download
Exclusive iTunes EP 2
- Released: 17 January 2006
- Label: Columbia
- Format: Digital download
Additional Futures
- Released: 15 February 2019
- Label: Self-released
- Format: Digital download

==== Singles ====
Year	Song	Peak chart position						Album
Year	Song	UK	IRL	SCO	US	US Adult	US AAA	Album
2002	"Strange & Beautiful (I'll Put a Spell on You)"	7	36	7	—	—	—	Aqualung
2002	"Good Times Gonna Come"	71	—	79	—	—	—	Aqualung
2003	"Brighter Than Sunshine"	37	—	53	—	32	3	Still Life
2004	"Easier to Lie"	60	—	62	—	—	—	Still Life
2007	"Cinderella"	—	—	—	—	—	—	Memory Man
2007	"Pressure Suit"	—	—	—	—	—	—	Memory Man
2010	"Fingertip"	—	—	—	—	—	—	Magnetic North
2014	"Tape 2 Tape" (feat. Joel Compass)	—	—	—	—	—	—	10 Futures
2019	"Use Me"	—	—	—	—	—	—	Additional Futures

==== DVDs ====
Year	Title
2004	Live 2004
2004	It's Easy to Play the Aqualung Way

==== Other releases/promos ====
Year	Title
2003	Baby Goodbye
2005	The All or Nothing EP
2006	Live & Rarities: With Apologies to Anyone Who Is Actually Heartbroken

=== RUTH ===
Title	Album details
Harrison	Released: 1 May 1999; Label: Arc Records
Donut (A Collection of Songs for Fellow Appreciators of RUTH)	Released: 2003; Label: Vanity Press; Format: Double CD; Catalogue Number: VPLP001

== Selected songwriting discography ==
Year	Artist	Album	Song	Co-written with
2004	Tiësto	Just Be	"UR"	Tiësto
2009	Christophe Willem	Caféine	"Heartbox"	Guy Chambers
2010	Boyzone	Brother	"Time"	Greg Wells, Kim Oliver
2010	Brooke Fraser	Flags	"Who Are We Fooling? (featuring Aqualung)"	Brooke Fraser
2011	Ximena Sariñana	Ximena Sariñana	"Wrong Miracle"	Ximena Sariñana
2011	Aqualung & Lucy Schwartz	The Twilight Saga: Breaking Dawn – Part 1 (Original Motion Picture Soundtrack)	"Cold"	Lucy Schwartz
2011	Amy Meredith	Non-album single	"Pick Up Your Tricks"	Amy Meredith
2012	Lianne La Havas	Is Your Love Big Enough?	"Is Your Love Big Enough?"	Lianne La Havas, Willy Mason
2012	Lianne La Havas	Is Your Love Big Enough?	"Lost & Found"	Lianne La Havas
2012	Lianne La Havas	Is Your Love Big Enough?	"Au Cinéma"	Lianne La Havas
2012	Lianne La Havas	Is Your Love Big Enough?	"No Room for Doubt (featuring Willy Mason)"	Lianne La Havas, Willy Mason
2012	Lianne La Havas	Is Your Love Big Enough?	"Age"	Lianne La Havas
2012	Lianne La Havas	Is Your Love Big Enough?	"Everything Everything"	Lianne La Havas
2012	Lianne La Havas	Is Your Love Big Enough?	"Gone"	Lianne La Havas
2012	Lianne La Havas	Is Your Love Big Enough?	"They Could Be Wrong"	Lianne La Havas
2012	Paloma Faith	Fall to Grace	"Just Be"	Paloma Faith, Greg Wells
2012	Jason Mraz	Love Is a Four Letter Word	"Everything Is Sound"	Jason Mraz, Mike Daly, Martin Terefe, Tyler Phillips
2012	Diane Birch	Non-album single	"Unfucked"	Diane Birch
2012	Good Old War	Come Back As Rain	"Amazing Eyes"	Good Old War
2012	For King & Country	Crave	"Light It Up"	For King & Country
2012	For King & Country	Crave	"Pushing on a Pull Door"	For King & Country
2013	Lucy Schwartz	Timekeeper	"Boomerang"	Lucy Schwartz
2013	Sara Bareilles	The Blessed Unrest	"Eden"	Sara Bareilles
2013	Sara Bareilles	The Blessed Unrest	"Islands"	Sara Bareilles
2013	Laura Jansen	Elba	"The Lighthouse"	Laura Jansen
2013	Laura Jansen	Elba	"Queen of Elba"	Laura Jansen
2013	Laura Jansen	Elba	"Golden"	Laura Jansen
2013	Laura Jansen	Elba	"Little Things (You)"	Laura Jansen, David Sneddon, James Bauer-Mein
2013	Laura Jansen	Elba	"Same Heart"	Laura Jansen, Kim Oliver
2013	Laura Jansen	Elba	"Around the Sun"	Laura Jansen
2013	BT	A Song Across Wires	"Surrounded"	BT
2014	For King & Country	Run Wild. Live Free. Love Strong.	"Run Wild"	Andy Mineo, Joel Smallbone, Luke Smallbone, Tedd Tjornhom
2014	For King & Country	Run Wild. Live Free. Love Strong.	"To the Dreamers"	Joel Smallbone, Luke Smallbone
2014	For King & Country	Run Wild. Live Free. Love Strong.	"Without You"	Timmy Jones, Blake Kanicka, Stephen Lynch, Joel Smallbone, Luke Smallbone, Benjamin Backus, Mark Campbell
2014	For King & Country	Run Wild. Live Free. Love Strong.	"Already Home"	Joel Smallbone, Luke Smallbone
2014	Brooke Fraser	Brutal Romantic	"Thunder"	Brooke Fraser
2014	Luke Sital-Singh	The Fire Inside	"We Don't Belong"	Luke Sital-Singh
2015	Waters	What's Real	"Rebel Yell"	Waters
2015	Mika	No Place in Heaven	"Last Party"	Mika, Teemu Brunila
2015	Lianne La Havas	Blood	"Green & Gold"	Lianne La Havas, Jamie Lidell
2015	Lianne La Havas	Blood	"What You Don't Do"	Sam Dew
2015	Lianne La Havas	Blood	"Tokyo"	Lianne La Havas
2015	Lianne La Havas	Blood	"Wonderful"	Lianne La Havas, Howard Lawrence
2015	Lianne La Havas	Blood	"Ghost"	Lianne La Havas
2015	Lianne La Havas	Blood	"Good Goodbye"	Lianne La Havas
2018	Lyonheart	No Brakes	"Running"	Lyonheart
2020	Lianne La Havas	Lianne La Havas	"Bittersweet"	Lianne La Havas, DiFosco Ervin, Jr., Isaac Hayes, Rudy Love
2020	Lianne La Havas	Lianne La Havas	"Read My Mind"	Lianne La Havas, Benjamin Edwards
2020	Lianne La Havas	Lianne La Havas	"Green Papaya"	Lianne La Havas, Samuel Crowe, Frida Touray
2020	Lianne La Havas	Lianne La Havas	"Can't Fight"	Lianne La Havas, Alexander Crossan
2020	Lianne La Havas	Lianne La Havas	"Paper Thin"	Lianne La Havas
2020	Lianne La Havas	Lianne La Havas	"Please Don't Make Me Cry"	Lianne La Havas, Nicholas Hakim
2020	Lianne La Havas	Lianne La Havas	"Seven Times"	Lianne La Havas
2020	Lianne La Havas	Lianne La Havas	"Courage"	Lianne La Havas, Joseph Harrison
2020	Lianne La Havas	Lianne La Havas	"Sour Flower"	Lianne La Havas, Samuel Crowe

== Selected production discography ==
Year	Artist	Album	Details
2005	Aqualung	Strange and Beautiful	Producer, mixer, engineer, arranger
2007	Aqualung	Memory Man	Producer, programmer
2008	Aqualung	Words and Music	Producer, mixer, engineer, arranger
2009	Seabird	Rocks into Rivers	Producer
2010	Aqualung & Lucy Schwartz	The Twilight Saga: Breaking Dawn – Part 1 (soundtrack)	Producer
2010	Aqualung	Magnetic North	Producer
2011	Amy Meredith	"Pick Up Your Tricks" (non-album single)	Producer
2012	Lianne La Havas	Is Your Love Big Enough?	Producer, mixer
2012	Diane Birch	"Untucked" (non-album single)	Producer
2012	For King & Country	Crave	Producer, programmer
2013	Lucy Schwartz	Timekeeper	Producer
2013	Laura Jansen	Elba	Producer
2014	Kina Grannis	Elements	Producer
2014	For King & Country	Run Wild. Live Free. Love Strong.	Producer
2015	Lianne La Havas	Blood	Producer
2015	Andreya Triana	Giants	Producer
2016	Tom Chaplin	The Wave	Producer, arranger
2016	Bat for Lashes	The Bride	Producer
