= Strange and Beautiful (Aqualung album) =

Compilation album by Aqualung
- Released: 22 March 2005
- Length: 48:21
- Label: Red Ink/Columbia
- Producer: Matt Hales

Aqualung chronology
Still Life (2003)	Strange and Beautiful (2005)	Exclusive iTunes EP (2005)

Professional ratings
Review scores
Source	Rating
Allmusic	4/5 stars
PopMatters	(8/10)

Strange and Beautiful is Aqualung's first US album release: a compilation of tracks from Aqualung's first two albums: Aqualung and Still Life. This compilation making up his first US release includes "Strange and Beautiful," "Brighter Than Sunshine," and "Falling Out of Love."

The track "Brighter Than Sunshine" reached #32 on the Billboard Adult Top 40 Chart in the U.S. Strange and Beautiful reached #108 on the Billboard Top 200 and also hit #1 on the Top Heatseekers Chart. As of December 2006, the album has sold over 250,000 copies in the US.

The song "Left Behind" (track 7) was used in a series of commercials for Chrysler. The song "Strange and Beautiful" is also featured on the soundtrack of the motion picture Wicker Park as well as the film A Lot Like Love.

== Track listing ==
1. "Strange & Beautiful (I'll Put a Spell on You)" – 3:51
2. "Falling Out of Love" – 4:03
3. "Good Times Gonna Come" – 3:53
4. "Brighter Than Sunshine" – 4:01
5. "Breaking My Heart" – 3:29
6. "Tongue-Tied" – 3:52
7. "Left Behind" – 3:47
8. "You Turn Me Round" – 4:19
9. "If I Fall" – 4:54
10. "Easier to Lie" – 3:14
11. "Extra Ordinary Thing" – 3:18
12. "Another Little Hole" – 5:34
