= Brighter Than Sunshine =

Single by Aqualung

from the album Still Life
- Released: 13 October 2003
- Genre: Piano rock
- Length: 4:01
- Label: Red Ink, Columbia, B-Unique
- Songwriter: Matt Hales
- Producers: Aqualung (Matt Hales) and Jacknife Lee

"Brighter Than Sunshine" is an indie pop ballad written and performed by Aqualung. First released on his 2003 album Still Life, it became the album's first single. It was later added to the 2005 compilation album Strange and Beautiful. "Brighter Than Sunshine" reached 32 on the Billboard Adult Top 40 chart in the U.S. and spent two weeks at 37 on the UK Singles Chart in 2003. The record was featured in the 2005 romantic comedy A Lot like Love, as well as in episodes of the American drama series Cold Case and the Canadian sitcom Schitt's Creek.

== Composition ==
"Brighter Than Sunshine" is a piano rock ballad. The song was written exclusively by Matt Hales, who goes by the stage name Aqualung. Production was done by Hales and Snow Patrol producer Jacknife Lee.

== Critical reception ==
Allmusic praised "Brighter Than Sunshine" as being on par with bands like Coldplay and Keane, congratulating the track as one of the highlights of Strange and Beautiful. BBC music reviewer Niky Daley said the track, "...starts the ten track feast for your ears. Your winter blues will be banished as you bask in this triumphantly uplifting anthem."

== Usage in other media ==
The record was featured in the 2005 romantic comedy A Lot Like Love, as well as in an episode of the American drama Cold Case. It was also used on the CBC Television series Schitt's Creek, season 5 episode "Meet the Parents" in 2019.

== Charts ==
Chart (2003–2006)	Peak position
Australia (ARIA Hitseekers)	16
US Adult Pop Airplay (Billboard)	32
US Adult Alternative Airplay (Billboard)	3
US Bubbling Under Hot 100 (Billboard)	116
UK Singles (OCC)	37
