= Old Sea Brigade =

American singer-songwriter

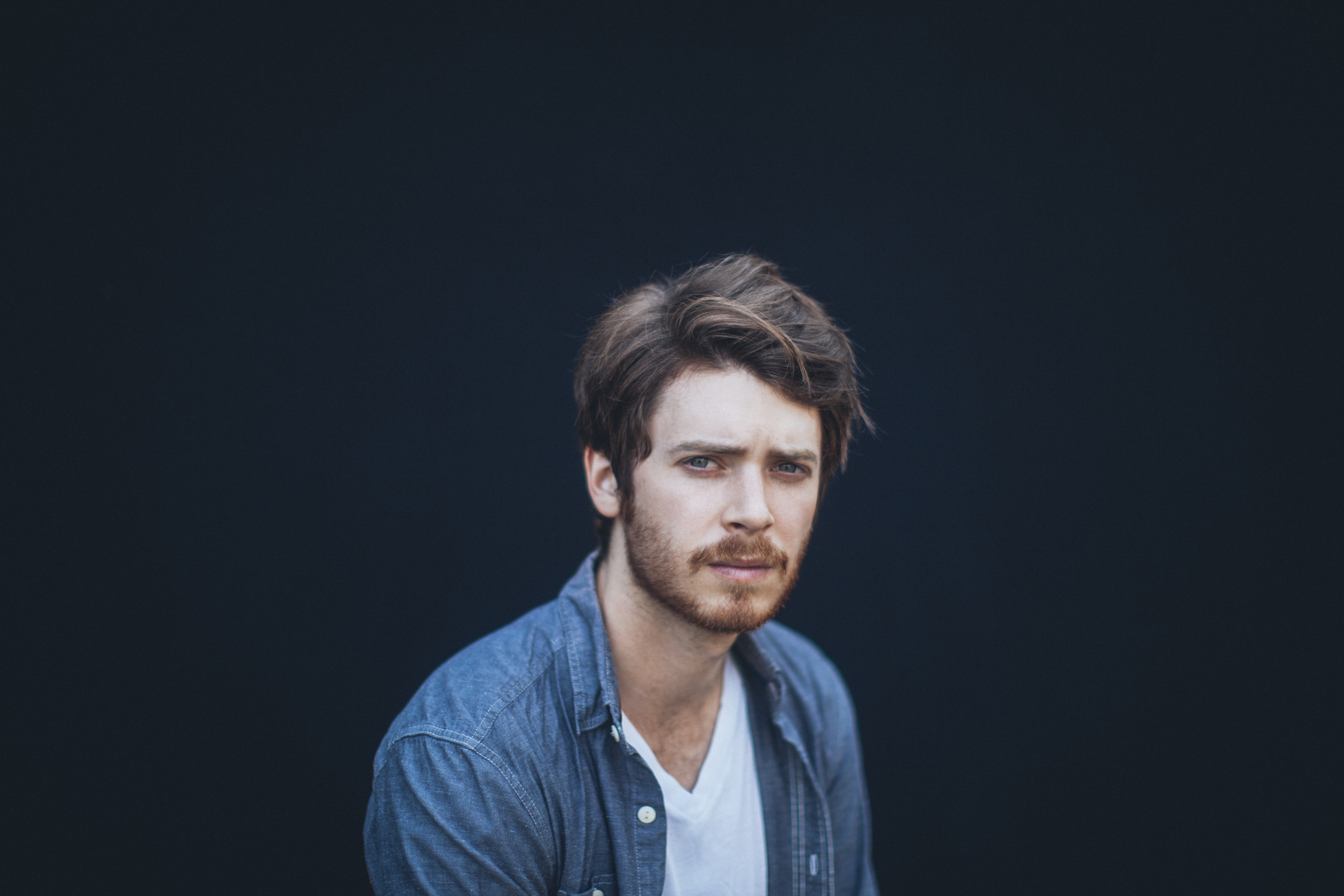

Background information
- Born: Benjamin George Cramer; April 16, 1991 (age 34); Atlanta, Georgia, United States
- Genres: indie; folk
- Occupations: Singer, songwriter
- Years active: 2015–present
- Labels: Nettwerk Music Group
- Website: www.oldseabrigade.com

Benjamin George Cramer, better known as Old Sea Brigade, is an American songwriter and producer, signed to Nettwerk Music Group. Originally from Atlanta, Georgia, Cramer currently resides in Nashville, Tennessee.

== Career ==
Old Sea Brigade's debut self-titled EP was released in January 2016 to much critical acclaim. Cramer spent the following year touring the United States and Europe, including support shows with Joseph, Julien Baker, and Benjamin Francis Leftwich. His music has been described as indie folk with "a sense of Southern-gothic". Old Sea Brigade released his debut album Ode to a Friend in January 2019. In August 2020, Old Sea Brigade released a collaborative EP, All The Ways You Sing In The Dark, with his friend, Luke Sital-Singh. Old Sea Brigade's music has been featured in notable TV shows including Grey's Anatomy, This Is Us, Nashville, and A Million Little Things.

== Discography ==
Year	Work	Track Listing	Notes
2016	Old Sea Brigade – EP	1. Love Brought Weight; 2. Better Days; 3. Georgia; 4. Sleep in the Park; 5. Towns	Debut EP
2016	Christmas Dream – Single	1. Christmas Dream	Single
2017	Wash Me Away – EP	1. Once Again; 2. Wash Me Away; 3. All the Same; 4. Wishing Well; 5. Laying Here	Explicit Content
2017	We Belong – Single	1. We Belong	Pat Benatar cover
2017	Cover My Own – EP	1. Tidal Wave; 2. Cover My Own; 3. Let Me Know; 4. Waiting For; 5. Did You Think It Was Right?	Acoustic Version released in 2018
2017	Songs for the Holidays – EP	1. Motel 6 and Christmas Eve; 2. Blue Christmas; 3. Christmas Eve Can Kill You; 4. If We Make It Through December	Original Song; Cover of Elvis Presley; Cover of The Everly Brothers; Cover of Merle Haggard and The Strangers
2019	Ode to a Friend	1. Sinkhole; 2. Seen a Ghost; 3. Feel You; 4. Resistance; 5. Hope; 6. Stay Up; 7. Western Eyes; 8. Straight Through the Sun; 9. Want It Again; 10. Cigarette; 11. Ode to a Friend	Debut Album
2020	All The Ways You Sing In The Dark - EP	1. Call Me When You Land; 2. Summertime Low; 3. Amaranth Moonlight; 4. Los Feliz	Collaborative EP with Luke Sital-Singh
2021	Motivational Speaking	1. How It Works; 2. Day by Day; 3. Salt; 4. Nothing Clever; 5. American Impressions; 6. Caroline; 7. Mirror Moon; 8. High Times; 9. Walls; 10. Still; 11. Come Tomorrow; 12. 4 July	
2022	5am Paradise	1. 5am Paradise; 2. Drive Alone; 3. Man Made by Delusion; 4. Somedays; 5. Stayed Up Late; 6. Monochrome; 7. Old Blooded; 8. This Again; 9. If You're Falling Asleep; 10. Hands in the Dirt	
2024	If Only I Knew, Pt. 1 – EP	1. Heaven In The Right Light; 2. Polygraph; 3. Rest Assured (Feat. Amanda Bergman); 4. If You Had To Ask; 5. Real Life; 6. Away It Goes (with Albin Lee Meldau)	
2025	OurVinyl Sessions - EP	1. Heaven In The Right Light; 2. Caroline; 3. Tidal Wave; 4. Rest Assured	
2025	If Only I Knew, Pt. 2	1. The Tourist; 2. Green Tea (feat. Katie Pruitt); 3. If Love Was the Answer; 4. According to Planned; 5. Distant Skies; 6. Happy Birthday; 7. Speaking of You	
2025	At My Best – Single	1. At My Best	with Hannah Georgas
