= True Grit (2010 soundtrack) =

True Grit: Original Motion Picture Soundtrack

Soundtrack album by Carter Burwell
- Released: December 21, 2010
- Recorded: 2010
- Genre: Western
- Length: 35:25
- Label: Nonesuch
- Producer: Carter Burwell

Carter Burwell chronology
Howl (2010)	True Grit: Original Motion Picture Soundtrack (2010)	The Twilight Saga: Breaking Dawn – Part 1 (2011)

Professional ratings
Review scores
Source	Rating
Allmusic	4/5 stars

True Grit: Original Motion Picture Soundtrack is a soundtrack to the 2010 film of the same name. True Grit is the 15th Coen brothers film scored by long-time collaborator Carter Burwell. The Coens discussed the idea of using 19th-century church music, "something that was severe (sounding). It couldn't be soothing or uplifting, and at the same time it couldn't be outwardly depressing. I spent the summer going through hymn books," Burwell said.

Johnny Cash's rendition of "God's Gonna Cut You Down" was used in the theatrical trailer. The 1888 hymn "Leaning on the Everlasting Arms" is used as Mattie Ross' theme, and about a quarter of the score is based on it. Iris DeMent's version, from her 2004 album Lifeline, is used during the end credits. Other hymns are also referenced in the score, including "What a Friend We Have in Jesus", "Hold to God's Unchanging Hand", and "The Glory-Land Way". Because the hymns are considered pre-composed music, the score was deemed ineligible to be nominated for Best Original Score in the 2010 Academy Awards.

== Track listing ==
No.	Title	Length
1.	"The Wicked Flee"	2:35
2.	"La Boeuf Takes Leave"	3:00
3.	"Little Blackie"	1:06
4.	"River Crossing"	1:25
5.	"The Hanging Man"	1:57
6.	"Talk About Suffering"	1:33
7.	"Your Headstrong Ways"	0:31
8.	"A Great Adventure"	1:00
9.	"We Don't Need Him Do We?"	0:52
10.	"Father's Gun"	1:22
11.	"A Methodist and a Son of a Bitch"	3:02
12.	"Talking to Horses"	0:35
13.	"A Turkey Shoot"	2:50
14.	"Taken Hostage"	2:03
15.	"One Against Four"	1:39
16.	"The Snake Pit"	3:18
17.	"Ride to Death"	2:29
18.	"I Will Carry You"	1:59
19.	"A Quarter Century"	1:24
20.	"The Grave"	0:59
Total length:		35:25

=== Production credits ===
- Original Music by Carter Burwell
- Soundtrack Album Produced by Carter Burwell
- Executive in Charge of Music for Paramount Pictures: Randy Spendlove
- Soundtrack Album Coordinator: Jason Richmond
- Conducted by Carter Burwell
- Orchestrated by Carter Burwell and Sonny Kompanek
- Music Scoring Mixer: Michael Farrow
- Additional Engineering: Lawrence Manchester
- Music Recorded at The Manhattan Center, New York City
- Music Mixed at The Body, New York City
- Orchestra Contractor: Sandra Park
- Music Copyist: Tony Finno
- Composer's Assistant: Dean Parker
- Music Editor: Todd Kasow
- Assistant Music Editor: Mick Gormaley
- Mastering by Robert C. Ludwig at Gateway Mastering Studios Inc.
