= Magnetic North (Aqualung album) =

Studio album by Aqualung
- Released: 20 April 2010
- Recorded: Winter 2009 at The Bank, Burbank, California, and The Box, Los Angeles, California
- Genre: Pop rock
- Length: 48:43
- Label: Verve Forecast, Fullfill Records
- Producer: Matt Hales

Aqualung chronology
| Words and Music (2008) | Magnetic North (2010) | 10 Futures (2015) |

Magnetic North is the sixth studio album by Aqualung. The album was released in the UK and US on 20 April 2010 and was recorded in Los Angeles.

On 23 February 2010, Hales posted on his Facebook page: "My album is now actually finished. As I suspected, it is called Magnetic North. I am very pleased with it". He went on to say "It's hard to describe. It's like 12 kids who you would never guess were in the same family until you hear them speaking. See? I told you it's hard to describe."

He also stated that tracks from the record and further details would be available in "The coming weeks thus driving you wild with anticipation."

On 2 March 2010, the debut single, "Fingertip", was released on iTunes and via Myspace.

Professional ratings
Review scores
| Source | Rating |
|---|---|
| Allmusic | 3.5/5 stars |

== Track listing ==
1. "New Friend" – 4:00
2. "Reel Me In" – 4:05
3. "Sundowning (with Kelly Sweet)" – 4:24
4. "36 Hours" – 3:28
5. "Fingertip" – 3:15
6. "Lost" – 4:36
7. "Time Moves Slow" (with Alison Sudol) – 4:16
8. "California" – 1:20
9. "Remember Us (with Sara Bareilles)" – 6:10
10. "Hummingbird" – 3:56
11. "Thin Air" – 4:22
12. "Magnetic North" – 4:34
