= The Fifth Estate (soundtrack) =

The Fifth Estate (Original Motion Picture Soundtrack)

Film score by Carter Burwell
- Released: October 8, 2013
- Recorded: 2013
- Genre: Film score
- Length: 61:23
- Label: Lakeshore
- Producer: Carter Burwell

Carter Burwell chronology
The Twilight Saga: Breaking Dawn – Part 2 (2012)	The Fifth Estate (2013)	Mr. Holmes (2015)

The Fifth Estate (Original Motion Picture Soundtrack) is the film score to the 2013 film The Fifth Estate directed by Bill Condon, starring Benedict Cumberbatch, Daniel Brühl, Anthony Mackie, David Thewlis, Alicia Vikander, Stanley Tucci, and Laura Linney. The film score was composed by Carter Burwell and its soundtrack was released by Lakeshore Records on October 8, 2013.

== Development ==
In May 2013, it was announced that Carter Burwell would compose the score for The Fifth Estate, after previously working with Condon on Gods and Monsters (1998), Kinsey (2004) The Twilight Saga: Breaking Dawn – Part 1 (2011) and Part 2 (2012). When he read the script, Burwell thought the relationship between Julian Assange and Daniel Domscheit-Berg was the center, and to understand Assange he read the Julian Assange: The Unauthorised Autobiography and concluded that his theme should be that of a damaged child; while he wanted his character to be approachable or sympathetic, having really achieved something, but the personal aspect of the film was subsumed by the political aspects. He wrote music for the political aspects as Berg joins WikiLeaks, and while developing in post-production, the film dwelled deeper through the thriller aspects, and in the end, they had almost used non-stop electronic motion in the score.

Burwell initially preferred to have less music, but Condon wanted the use of music and the dialogues and typing sounds would distract the audience. The real Berg sent him samples of music he and his friends listened to in Berlin at the time, but Burwell felt it was not edgy. Hence, he accompanied with the use of electronics and for a more contemporary approach, he reached out to composers Johnny Klimek and Reinhold Heil for advice, whom recommended remix artist-cum-composer Gabriel Mounsey. Burwell sent multi-tracks of his compositions to Mounsey, tuned to the picture, and the latter would remix and send it back to Burwell, who would remix it again. After few attempts, it worked well and Mounsey remixed a quarter of the cues.

Initially, Burwell had composed an electronic score with guitar portions by David Torn. But in a later meeting with Condon, the latter wanted some emotional cues accompanied with traditional orchestration, especially in the concluding 15 minutes when the drama ended with the destruction of Wikileaks platform. Hence, the electronics were left behind and strings and woodwinds were utilized in the sequence for an open-ended conclusion.

== Track listing ==
All music is composed by Carter Burwell, except as noted.

No.	Title	Length
1.	"A History of Media"	2:33
2.	"Live"	2:27
3.	"The Family"	1:10
4.	"The Submission Platform"	3:02
5.	"Always" (performed by Amon Tobin)	3:40
6.	"The Informer"	2:32
7.	"Face to Face"	1:48
8.	"The Veil of Secrecy"	0:46
9.	"The Next Time"	1:33
10.	"Never Mess With Sunday" (performed by Yppah)	4:35
11.	"The Assassination of Oscar Kingara"	1:05
12.	"Collateral Murder"	4:23
13.	"Take the Fight to Them"	2:34
14.	"Come Alone"	1:26
15.	"Elephant" (performed by Tame Impala)	3:35
16.	"The Return of Daniel"	1:53
17.	"We Promise to Publish in Full"	3:31
18.	"Extraction"	1:58
19.	"Come Catch Me" (performed by Emika)	4:09
20.	"The Destruction of the Platform"	2:05
21.	"History Will Be the Judge"	2:33
22.	"No One Will be Able to Submit"	1:58
23.	"The Fifth Estate"	3:07
24.	"Asylum"	3:00
Total length:		61:23

== Reception ==
Adam Smith of Empire and Dennis Harvey of Variety described the score "insistent" and "equally pounding". Christy Lemire of RogerEbert.com called it a "thumping techno score". The Hollywood Reporter called the score "bombastic". Critic from the Film Festival Traveller wrote "The score by Carter Burwell works with the surgical precision of a sledgehammer, informing you, 'This part's exciting! This bit's sad! Drama! Oh, it's exciting again!'"

== Personnel ==
Credits adapted from liner notes:

- Music composer, producer, programmer, conductor and orchestrator – Carter Burwell
- Score remixed by – Gabriel Mounsey
- Recording and mixing – Michael Farrow
- Score editor – Todd Kasow
- Assistant score editor – Debora Lilavois
- Musicians' contractor – Sandra Park
- Concertmaster – Sharon Yamada
- Musical assistance – Dean Parker
- Copyist – Tony Finno
- A&R director – Eric Craig
- Art direction – John Bergin
- Executive producer – Brian McNelis, Skip Williamson

Musicians

- Cello – Eileen Moon, Patrick Jee
- Clarinet – Pavel Vinnisky
- French horn – Michelle Baker
- Guitar – David Torn
- Viola – Robert Rinehart, Shmuel Katz
- Violin – Jung Sun Yoo, Kuan Lu, Suzanne Ornstein
