= Seven Psychopaths (soundtrack) =

Seven Psychopaths (Original Motion Picture Soundtrack)

Soundtrack album by Carter Burwell and various artists
- Released: 23 October 2012
- Studios: Abbey Road Studios, London; The Body, New York City
- Genres: Film soundtrack; film score
- Length: 57:01
- Label: Lakeshore
- Producer: Carter Burwell

Carter Burwell chronology
The Twilight Saga: Breaking Dawn – Part 1 (2011)	Seven Psychopaths (2012)	The Twilight Saga: Breaking Dawn – Part 2 (2012)

Seven Psychopaths (Original Motion Picture Soundtrack) is the soundtrack album to the 2012 film Seven Psychopaths directed by Martin McDonagh. The soundtrack featured original score composed by Carter Burwell and licensed songs as heard in the film. The album was released through Lakeshore Records digitally on 23 October 2012 and in CDs on 20 November 2012.

== Development ==
The film score is composed by Carter Burwell, who previously worked with McDonagh on In Bruges (2008). McDonagh sent the script to Burwell in the spring of 2012, with the euphonious title. Burwell, though not wanting to describe the plot, added that the film itself is set about a fictional story of writer working on a script which was called Seven Psychopaths, which in turn is a film within a film narrative and the writer did not realize that he is a character in the film, and with every other character being a psychopath.

The score primarily wanted to accomplish two things, one to make the characters being human and sympathetic as possible, as the reality of the story and characters being subverted and reframed, provided a worthy challenge to draw the audience in to the characters' heads and emphasize it with them emotionally. Burwell approached the script, as love story between Billy and Marty, which led their theme being an important aspect in the film.

Another important goal was to make the climax of the story redemptive. Burwell, stated that Marty (Colin Farrell) tells the audiences that the ending of the fictional film will be a positive as most of the characters were dead at the end of the film, which led Burwell uncertain on how to approach the ending sincerely. As Burwell noted that McDonagh also felt the same way as the fictional character Marty, the musical theme which was used for the psychopaths "The Quaker" and "The Vietnamese Priest" evolve into the ending theme titled "Redemption" so that audience could perceive the redemption as real and deserving.

The score was recorded at the Abbey Road Studios in London. McDonagh described the importance of the music in the film, as a result the licensed music which was incorporated in the film being a combination of the modern songs and the 1960s classical numbers and orchestral compositions.

== Release ==
Lakeshore Records released the soundtrack digitally on 23 October 2012 and in physical formats on 20 November 2012.

== Reception ==
David Brook of Blueprint wrote "the soundtrack is a bit all over the place, but you know what, so is my taste in music and this album is full to the brim with music that I love". James Christopher Monger of AllMusic wrote "Burwell can conjure up dread and tension with the best of them, and his work here is stellar as usual, especially when sandwiched between works from Berlioz and Carl Orff, but it's Seven Psychopaths' pacing that ultimately wins out, striking the perfect balance between beauty and mayhem." David Rooney of The Hollywood Reporter wrote "[the film] benefits in the extended denouement from Carter Burwell's doleful score, which is supplemented by some cool vocal choices and plays nicely against the verbal comedy".

Michael Phillips of Chicago Tribune added that the film is "scored with sinister ripples of doom by composer Carter Burwell". Peter Howell of Toronto Star wrote that Burwell's score "goes further than the Coens ever would". Peter Debruge of Variety stated "Carter Burwell supplies a score—like so much of his work for the Coen brothers—that puts a funereal spin on the material's almost playful disregard for human life." Dana Stevens of Slate called it a "crisp, witty score by Carter Burwell". John Walsh of The Independent wrote "The excellent score is by Joel and Ethan Coen's favourite composer, Carter Burwell". Chris Cabin of Slant Magazine wrote "Carter Burwell's admirably multifaceted score, and indie-rock tunes like "Angela Surf City" are mixed and balanced beautifully in the back".

== Track listing ==
No.	Title	Artist(s)	Length
1.	"Angel of Death"	Hank Williams	1:47
2.	"The First Cut Is the Deepest"	P. P. Arnold	3:15
3.	"The Quaker"	Carter Burwell	4:01
4.	"Berlioz: Strophes Premiers Transports Que Nui N'oblie (Roméo Et Juliette, Op 17-Version With Original Parts, Part 1)"	The Monteverdi Choir And Orchestre Révolutionnaire et Romantique with Catherine Robbin, Jean-Paul Fouchécourt and John Eliot Gardiner	6:31
5.	"Zachariah"	Carter Burwell	0:54
6.	"Angela Surf City"	The Walkmen	3:20
7.	"Billy's Diary"	Carter Burwell	1:49
8.	"Dirty Dishes"	Deer Tick	3:17
9.	"My Lai"	Carter Burwell	1:20
10.	"Country Dumb"	Josh T. Pearson	10:06
11.	"Der Monde: Ach, Da Hängt Ja Der Mond! (Klein Kind/Chor)"	Teresa Holloway, Philharmonia Chorus, Philharmonia Orchestra and Wolfgang Sawallisch	3:39
12.	"All Gray and Shit"	Carter Burwell	0:56
13.	"This Movie Ends My Way"	Carter Burwell	2:18
14.	"Stranded"	The Walkmen	4:23
15.	"Billy's Ending"	Carter Burwell	0:57
16.	"It Might"	Carter Burwell	4:08
17.	"Seven Psychopaths"	Carter Burwell	0:59
18.	"Different Drum"	Stone Poneys feat. Linda Ronstadt	2:38
19.	"Zach's Back"	Carter Burwell	0:43
Total length:			57:01

== Personnel ==
Credits adapted from liner notes:

- Composer, conductor and orchestrator: Carter Burwell
- Music scoring mixer: Mike Farrow
- Music editor: Dina Eaton
- Contractor: Isobel Griffiths
