= Lucy Schwartz =

American singer-songwriter (born 1989)

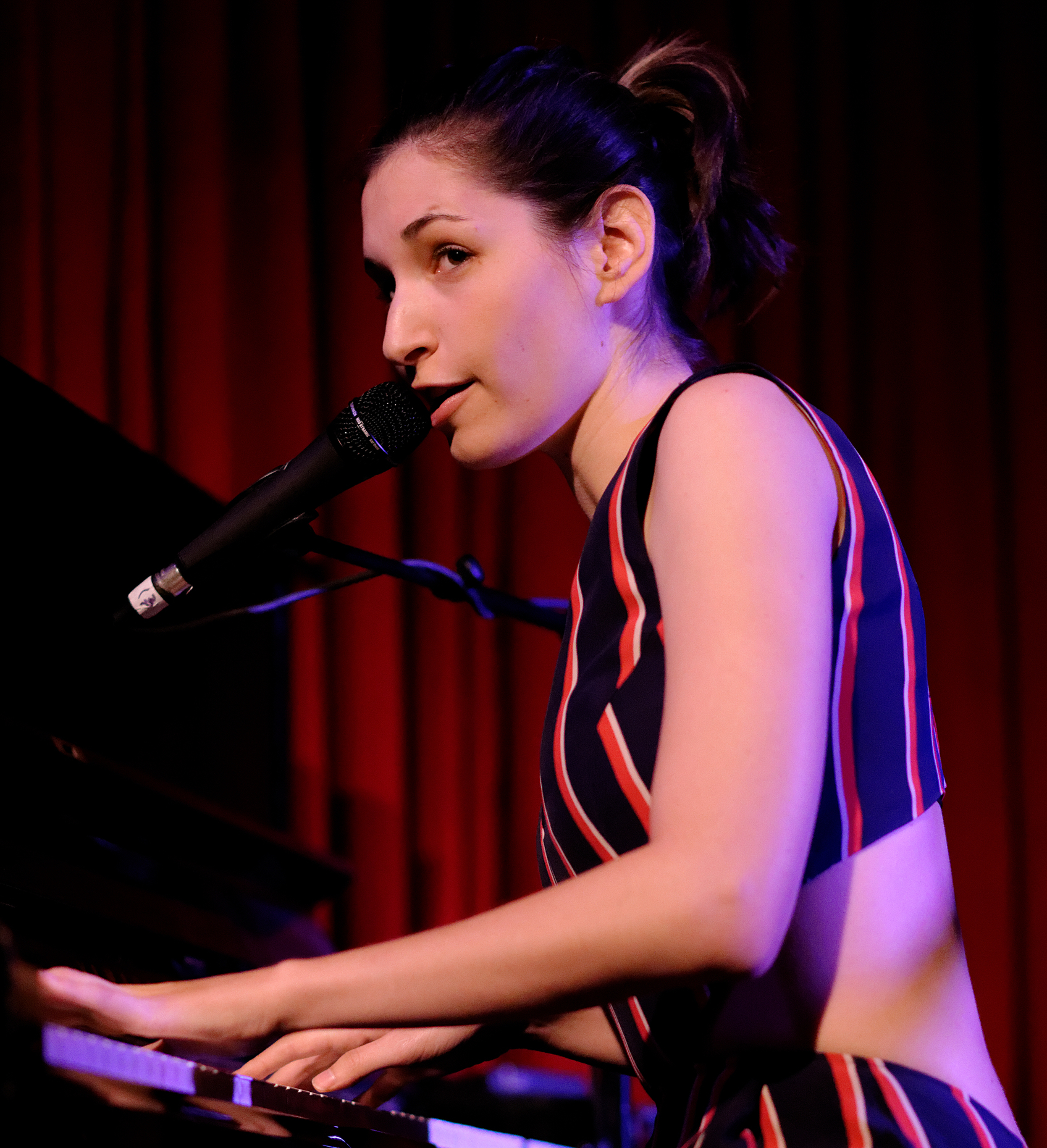

Background information
- Born: Lucy Nicole Schwartz; December 7, 1989 (age 36); Los Angeles, California, U.S.
- Genres: Indie pop
- Occupations: Singer, songwriter
- Years active: 2006–present
- Website: lucyschwartzmusic.com

Lucy Nicole Schwartz (born December 7, 1989) is an American singer and songwriter from Los Angeles, California. She has become well known for writing and performing original songs for film and TV, including songs for The Twilight Saga: Breaking Dawn – Part 1, Nashville, Parenthood, Shrek Forever After and What Maisie Knew.

== Career ==
In 2010, Schwartz released her second album, Life in Letters.

In 2011, she had a duet with Aqualung on The Twilight Saga: Breaking Dawn and released the EP, Keep Me.

Schwartz has toured with Lilith Fair, with Sarah McLachlan and Sheryl Crow, and opened for the Weepies, Brandi Carlile, the Civil Wars, Agnes Obel, Toad the Wet Sprocket, A Fine Frenzy, Joshua Radin and the Belle Brigade.

Her songs have been used in over a dozen television programs, including Grey's Anatomy, Army Wives and The Good Wife. Schwartz wrote the international theme song for NBC's show, Parenthood, and she has written original songs for numerous films, including Twilight, Shrek Forever After, Mother and Child, Post Grad, Monte Carlo, Adam and the Meg Ryan comedy, The Women.

Her single "Boomerang" appeared in the closing credits of the fourth season finale of the television series Arrested Development, for which her father, David Schwartz, composed the soundtrack. She had previously performed the vocal recordings "Mr. F" and "For British Eyes Only" in a faux-English accent for the series.

Schwartz guest starred in the second season premiere of House of Lies, playing the role of a waitress dressed as a bumblebee and singing the Carpenters's song, "Close to You".

"Black Roses", a song written by Schwartz, is sung by the character of Scarlett O'Connor (portrayed by Clare Bowen) in the TV show Nashville. It peaked at number 29 on the US Country chart.

She has worked with the charities Heifer International, CHOC Children's Hospital, Rock 'n' Roll Camp for Girls, Songs of Love for Japan, and Symphony of Hope: The Haiti Project.

== Discography ==
=== Albums and EPs ===
- Winter in June (2007)
- Help Me! Help Me! EP (2010)
- Life in Letters (2010)
- Keep Me EP (2011)
- Timekeeper (2013)
- Dark Fairytale EP (2024)

=== Original songs in movie soundtracks ===
- "Beautiful" — The Women (opening song) (2008)
- "Count On Me" — The Women (end title song) (2008)
- '"Paper Plane" — Center Stage 2: Turn it Up (2008)
- "Little One" — Mother & Child (end title song) (2009)
- "Turn Back Around" — Post Grad (2009)
- "Gone Away" — Adam (2009)
- "Darling I Do" (with Landon Pigg) — Shrek Forever After (2010)
- "I Want The Sky" — Monte Carlo (2011)
- "Cold" (with Aqualung) — The Twilight Saga: Breaking Dawn (2011)
- "Feeling of Being" — What Maisie Knew (2012)
- "I Don't Know a Thing" — Remember Sunday (2013)
- "Blue Sky" — Remember Sunday (2013)

=== TV theme songs ===
- "When We Were Young" — Parenthood (international theme song) (2010)
- Rutherford Falls (with David Schwartz and the Halluci Nation) (2021)
