= Howl (soundtrack) =

Howl (Original Motion Picture Score)

Film score by Carter Burwell
- Released: October 12, 2010
- Recorded: 2009–2010
- Studio: Clinton Recording Studios, New York City
- Genre: Film score
- Length: 33:58
- Label: Lakeshore
- Producer: Carter Burwell

Carter Burwell chronology
The Kids Are All Right (2010)	Howl (2010)	True Grit (2010)

Howl (Original Motion Picture Score) is the film score to the 2010 film Howl directed by Rob Epstein and Jeffrey Friedman, starring James Franco as Allen Ginsberg. The film score is composed by Carter Burwell and released through Lakeshore Records on October 12, 2010.

== Development ==
Carter Burwell composed the film score after previously working with the director duo on The Celluloid Closet (1995). He was roped by them, even before they began writing the screenplay. Burwell was initially hesitant on writing a jazz score, but after watching an edit, he decided to go on writing a jazz score, as a poetic approach, while the score was written to support the emotional ebbs and flows of the poetry and the hallucinogenic rides of the animation. He further assembled an ensemble of virtuoso soloists to perform the score, resulting in a "beautiful, haunting, and thrilling" soundscape. It was also the last film score to be recorded at the Clinton Recording Studios in New York City before its closure on June 30, 2010.

== Critical reception ==
Reviewer based at The Film Scorer wrote "Burwell’s score mirrors each of “Howl’s” ebbs and flows, peaks and troughs, adding to and amplifying it at each moment." Tim Grierson of Screen International considered the score to be "emotional". Todd McCarthy of Variety wrote Burwell's "melodic, jazzy backgrounding mixes well with a number of period tunes." Harrison Pierce of Collider called it a "jazzy score". Nigel M. Smith of IndieWire wrote "Carter Burwell’s gorgeous, haunting score, gently carries the emotion through the remainder of the scenes." Reviewer based at the Santa Barbara Independent criticized it as an "ill-fitting emo music".

== Track listing ==
No.	Title	Length
1.	"Supernatural Darkness"	2:05
2.	"I Saw the Best Minds"	2:49
3.	"From Park to Pad to Bar to Bellevue"	4:16
4.	"Weeping in the Parks"	1:01
5.	"And Their Heads Shall Be Crowned"	2:47
6.	"My Mother"	3:22
7.	"Now Denver Is Lonesome for Her Heroes"	2:53
8.	"Prophecy"	4:24
9.	"Moloch!"	2:57
10.	"I'm with You in Rockland"	2:20
11.	"Angelic Bombs"	1:56
12.	"Holy"	3:08
Total length:		33:58

== Personnel ==
Credits adapted from liner notes:

- Composer, producer, orchestrator and piano – Carter Burwell
- Recording and mixing – Lawrence Manchester, Bryan Smith
- Musical assistance – Dean Parker
- Bass – Fima Ephron
- Cello – Maya Beiser
- Guitar – David Torn, Marc Ribot
- Violin – Laura Seaton
- Woodwind – Bohdan Hilash

== Accolades ==
Award	Category	Recipient(s) and nominee(s)	Result	Ref.
World Soundtrack Awards	Soundtrack Composer of the Year	Carter Burwell also for Where the Wild Things Are, The Blind Side, A Serious Man (all 2009) and The Kids Are All Right (2010)	Nominated	
