= Words and Music (Aqualung album) =

Studio album by Aqualung
- Released: 7 October 2008 (U.S.)
- Genre: Piano rock
- Length: 42:42
- Label: Verve Forecast
- Producer: Matt Hales; Ben Hales

Aqualung chronology
Memory Man (2007)	Words and Music (2008)	Magnetic North (2010)

Professional ratings
Review scores
Source	Rating
Allmusic	3.5/5 stars
Patrol Magazine	(9.4/10)

Words and Music is the fourth studio album by Aqualung. The album was released on 7 October 2008, in the U.S. It features acoustic versions of tracks from Aqualung's eponymous first album, Aqualung, and new songs written in a similar style. It does not follow on musically from the previous Memory Man.

On 31 August 2008 Hales released news of his upcoming album on his MySpace page "I'm really very pleased with the new album... It's a mixture of some old songs and some new songs and a song by Paul Simon. And it's emotional and candid and funny and friendly. It feels like coming home. I think you’ll like it".

== Track listing ==
1. "7 Keys" – 5:23
2. "Slip-Sliding Away" (Paul Simon) – 4:00
3. "Can't Get You Out of My Mind" – 3:06
4. "Good Goodnight" – 4:20
5. "Mr. Universe" – 3:59
6. "On My Knees" – 4:34
7. "Everything Changed" – 2:52
8. "When I Finally Get My Own Place" – 5:05
9. "Nothing Else Matters" – 4:08
10. "Arrivals" – 5:15
