= Memory Man (album) =

Studio album by Aqualung
- Released: March 13, 2007
- Recorded: May–October 2006 in South London
- Genre: Piano rock
- Length: 50:18 (US); 64:09 (Target edition)
- Label: Columbia
- Producer: Matt Hales; Ben Hales; Dan Swift

Aqualung chronology
Exclusive iTunes EP 2 (2006)	Memory Man (2007)	Words and Music (2008)

Memory Man is the third studio album by Aqualung. The album was released on 13 March 2007 in the U.S. and on 21 March 2007 in Japan. The first single from the album was "Pressure Suit". The album debuted at #88 on the Billboard 200 chart in its first week.

== Track listing ==
All tracks are written by Matt Hales except where noted.

No.	Title	Writer(s)	Length
1.	"Cinderella"		4:37
2.	"Pressure Suit"	Hales, Kim Oliver	4:56
3.	"Something to Believe In"	Hales, Oliver	3:38
4.	"Glimmer"	Hales, Oliver	4:00
5.	"Vapour Trail"	Hales, Oliver	5:42
6.	"Rolls So Deep"		4:27
7.	"The Lake"		4:26
8.	"Black Hole"		5:04
9.	"Outside"	Hales, Oliver	3:56
10.	"Garden of Love" (featuring Paul Buchanan of The Blue Nile)		5:55
11.	"Broken Bones"		3:42

=== Bonus tracks ===
Japanese release
No.	Title	Length
12.	"Blood on Our Hands"
13.	"Human Shield"

Best Buy version
No.	Title	Length
12.	"Good Times Gonna Come [Live at Portland Theater of Clouds at Rose Garden]"

iTunes version
No.	Title	Length
12.	"Blood on Our Hands"	4:31

Target version
No.	Title	Length
12.	"Brighter Than Sunshine [Live at St. James' Church Piccadilly]"	4:36
13.	"Another Little Hole [Live at St. James' Church Piccadilly]"	5:12
14.	"Just for a Moment [Live at St. James' Church Piccadilly"	3:51

== Reception ==
Professional ratings
Aggregate scores
Source	Rating
Metacritic	70/100
Review scores
Source	Rating
AllMusic	4/5 stars
Entertainment Weekly	B
LAS Magazine	9/10

Memory Man has received positive reviews. On the review aggregate site Metacritic, the album has a score of 70 out of 100, indicating "generally favorable reviews".

== Other ==
The song "Garden of Love" features guest vocals by Paul Buchanan of the Scottish band The Blue Nile.

The song "Something To Believe In" was featured in CSI: Miami's season 5 finale and in a season 4 episode of The CW's One Tree Hill. It has also been featured in The CW and ABC's Gossip Girl and Eli Stone commercials.

The song "The Lake" was used in an episode in the third season of the TV show Grey's Anatomy.
