= Luke Sital-Singh =

British singer-songwriter

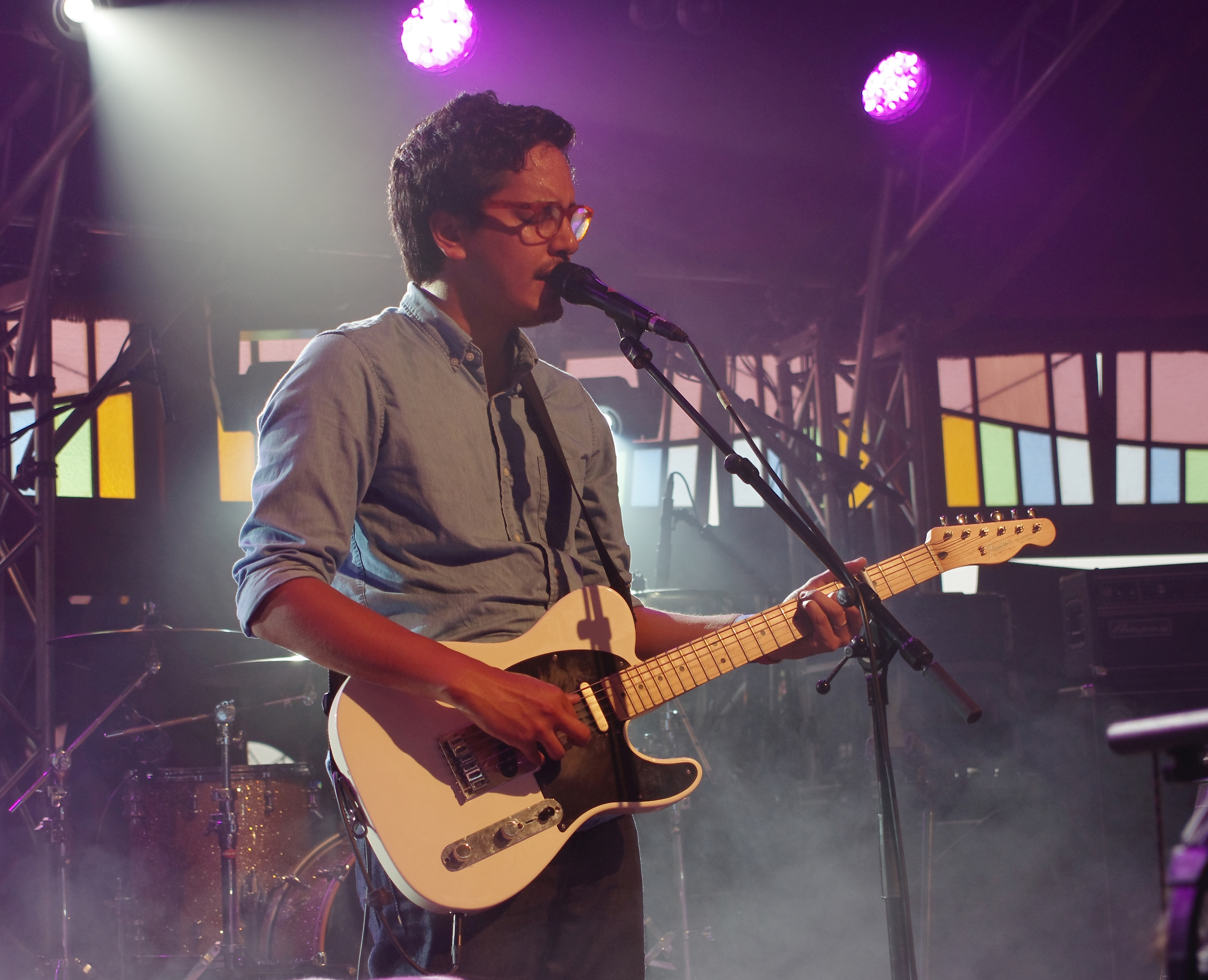
- Sital-Singh in 2014

Background information
- Origin: London, England
- Genres: Folk
- Years active: 2012–present
- Labels: Parlophone, Raygun
- Website: lukesitalsingh.com

Luke Sital-Singh is a British folk singer-songwriter.

== Career ==
Sital-Singh's first EP, entitled Fail for You, was released in 2012. On 18 July 2012, he was the featured artist on The Guardian's "New band of the day", with journalist Paul Lester saying that the singer-songwriter was "breathing life into a tired form".

"Bottled Up Tight", Sital-Singh's second single, gained a place on BBC Radio 1's In New Music We Trust playlist in March 2013, as well as a spot on Radio 6's Rebel playlist. His third EP Tornados was released in November 2013. Lead single "Nothing Stays the Same" made the BBC Radio 1 Music B-list on 21 October 2013 and was also added to BBC 6 Music. On 2 December 2013, Sital-Singh was named on the longlist for BBC's Sound of 2014 poll.

On 30 July 2014, Sital-Singh's song "Dark" was featured on an episode of Suits (S04E07). His song "Fail for You" was featured on an episode of Grey's Anatomy (S09E09), as well as an episode of the BBC comedy-drama series The Wrong Mans (S01E06). "Benediction" by Luke Sital-Singh was featured in the final season of the series Parenthood, on the S6E12 episode which aired on 22 January 2015. On 7 December 2016, "Nearly Morning" was featured on an episode of Frequency (S01E06).

On 18 August 2014, Sital-Singh's first album The Fire Inside was featured as BBC Radio 6's album of the day. The album was received with mixed reviews. It debuted at number 43 in the UK Albums Chart, and reached number 35 in the UK iTunes album chart.

On 24 May 2015, he appeared on BBC's Match of the Day singing "Nothing Stays the Same" in full and up to the credits on the final day of the English football season, intercut with video highlights of the season's Premier League games.

Sital-Singh's song "Killing Me" was used in the closing credits of Silent Witness on 28 January 2020 (S23E08). On 8 June 2021, “Honest Man” was used in the season finale episode Death Begins in Radiology of the American medical drama series New Amsterdam (S04E14).

== Personal life ==
Sital-Singh is of Indo-Jamaican descent. He is married to Hannah Cousins, an illustrator and printmaker who worked on the artwork for many of his albums. They have a son together named River.

== Discography ==
=== Studio albums ===
- The Fire Inside (18 August 2014)
- Time Is a Riddle (12 May 2017)
- A Golden State (5 April 2019)
- Dressing Like a Stranger (2 September 2022)
- Fool's Spring (21 February 2025)

=== Live albums ===
- Live at the Union Chapel (15 September 2017)

=== Extended plays ===
- Fail For You (8 August 2012)
- Old Flint (14 April 2013)
- Tornados (3 November 2013)
- The Breakneck Speed of Tomorrow (25 September 2015)
- Just a Song Before I Go (12 January 2018)
- Weight of Love (1 June 2018)
- New Haze (3 April 2020)
- All the Ways You Sing in the Dark (with Old Sea Brigade) (28 August 2020)
- Strange Weather (9 June 2023)
- Across the Evening Sky (9 February 2024)

=== Singles ===
- "Greatest Lovers" (15 April 2014)
- "Bottled Up Tight" (22 June 2014)
- "Nothing Stays the Same" (9 July 2014)
- "Benediction" (23 January 2015)
- "Still" (3 August 2015)
- "Pure" (6 May 2016)
- "This Woman's Work" / "American Girl" (23 December 2016)
- "Killing Me" (26 January 2017)
- "Hunger" (24 March 2017)
- "Oh My God" (25 April 2017)
- "Innocence" (5 May 2017)
- "Time is a Riddle" (14 July 2017)
- "Just a Song Before I Go" (17 November 2017)
- "Thirteen" (12 December 2017)
- "Afterneath" (23 March 2018)
- "Weight of Love" (4 May 2018)
- "The Last Day" (30 October 2018)
- "Love is Hard Enough Without the Winter" (4 December 2018)
- "Los Angeles" (10 January 2019)
- "Lover" (14 February 2019)
- "Strange and Beautiful (I'll Put a Spell on You) (6 December 2019)
- "Almost Home" (7 February 2020)
- "Undefeated" (6 March 2020)
- "Call Me When You Land" (with Old Sea Brigade) (22 May 2020)
- "Summertime Low" (with Old Sea Brigade) (3 July 2020)
- "Los Feliz" (with Old Sea Brigade) (31 July 2020)
- "Both Sides Now" (23 December 2020)
- "Time After Time" (26 March 2021)
- "Maybe Tomorrow" (28 April 2021)
- "Blind Missiles" (3 December 2021)
- "Me & God" (21 January 2022)
- "California" (4 March 2022)
- "Dressing Like a Stranger" (15 April 2022)
- "Summer Somewhere" (3 June 2022)
- "Can't Get High" (10 July 2022)
- "Rather Be" (26 August 2022 - featuring Christina Perri)
