= The Fire Inside (Luke Sital-Singh album) =

Studio album by Luke Sital-Singh
- Released: 18 August 2014
- Genre: Folk
- Label: Parlophone Records

Luke Sital-Singh chronology
Tornados (2013)	The Fire Inside (2014)	The Breakneck Speed of Tomorrow (2015)

The Fire Inside is the debut studio album by British singer-songwriter Luke Sital-Singh. It was released on 18 August 2014 and peaked at number 43 in the UK Official Charts

== Track listing ==
All tracks are written by Luke Sital-Singh.

No.	Title	Length
1.	"Nothing Stays the Same"	4:13
2.	"Greatest Lovers"	4:13
3.	"Bottled up Tight"	3:20
4.	"21st Century Heartbeat"	3:25
5.	"Lilywhite"	3:34
6.	"Nearly Morning"	4:32
7.	"I Have Been a Fire"	4:03
8.	"Everything Is Making You"	3:16
9.	"Fail for You"	4:16
10.	"We Don't Belong"	3:53
11.	"Cornerstone"	3:59
12.	"Benediction"	3:39
