= The Twilight Saga: Breaking Dawn – Part 2 (soundtrack) =

2012 album by various artists

The Twilight Saga: Breaking Dawn – Part 2 (Original Motion Picture Soundtrack)

Soundtrack album by various artists
- Released: November 13, 2012
- Recorded: Various times
- Genres: Alternative rock; electronic; indie rock; indie pop; pop
- Length: 56:25
- Labels: Chop Shop (songs only, except for Perri's song with Kazee); Atlantic
- Producer: Alexandra Patsavas

The Twilight Saga: Breaking Dawn – Part 2 (Original Motion Picture Soundtrack) is the soundtrack album to The Twilight Saga: Breaking Dawn – Part 2, released on November 13, 2012.

It is the fifth soundtrack in the saga's chronology, and it was once again produced by Alexandra Patsavas, the music director for the previous three films. The track list for the album was revealed on October 4, 2012, which included the announcement of the album's lead single. The album sold 229,000 copies in the US in 2012, making it the third best-selling soundtrack album of the year. It has sold 303,000 copies as of April 2013.

== Track listing ==
No.	Title	Writer(s)	Artist	Length
1.	"Where I Come From"	Michael Angelakos	Passion Pit	3:39
2.	"Bittersweet"	Ellie Goulding & Sonny Moore	Ellie Goulding	3:56
3.	"The Forgotten"	Billie Joe Armstrong; Tré Cool; Mike Dirnt	Green Day	4:59
4.	"Fire in the Water"	Leslie Feist; Brian LeBarton	Feist	2:30
5.	"Everything and Nothing"	Andy Ellis; Vega Schenk	The Boom Circuits	4:25
6.	"The Antidote"	Annie Erin Clark	St. Vincent	3:39
7.	"Speak Up"	Christopher Chu	POP ETC	4:40
8.	"Heart of Stone"	Neil Reed; Kieran Scragg	Iko	3:53
9.	"Cover Your Tracks"	David Cameron Wilton	A Boy and His Kite	4:31
10.	"Ghosts"	James Vincent McMorrow	James Vincent McMorrow	3:45
11.	"All I've Ever Needed"	Paul McDonald; Nikki Reed	Paul McDonald & Nikki Reed	3:56
12.	"New for You"	Reeve Carney	Reeve Carney	3:10
13.	"A Thousand Years" (Part 2)	Steve Kazee; Christina Perri	Christina Perri feat. Steve Kazee	5:07
14.	"Plus Que Ma Propre Vie" (More Than My Own Life)	Carter Burwell	Carter Burwell	4:15
Total length:				56:25

== Score ==
The Twilight Saga: Breaking Dawn – Part 2 (Original Motion Picture Score)

Film score by Carter Burwell
- Released: November 27, 2012
- Genre: Soundtrack
- Length: 55:15
- Label: Atlantic Records

Carter Burwell chronology
Seven Psychopaths (2012)	The Twilight Saga: Breaking Dawn – Part 2 (Original Motion Picture Score) (2012)	The Fifth Estate (2012)

The score, like the original film as well as Breaking Dawn – Part 1, was composed by Carter Burwell, following Howard Shore, who scored Eclipse and Alexandre Desplat, who scored New Moon. The album was released in North America on November 27, 2012, by Atlantic Records. It contains elements from the scores of both New Moon and Eclipse.

No.	Title	Length
1.	"Twilight Overture"	3:02
2.	"A World Bright and Buzzing"	1:12
3.	"The Lamb Hunts the Lion"	1:59
4.	"Meet Renesmee"	2:43
5.	"Here Goes Nothing"	0:59
6.	"Sparkles at Last"	1:04
7.	"Catching Snowflakes"	1:41
8.	"The Immortal Children"	2:01
9.	"Merchant of Venice"	0:44
10.	"Into the White"	1:04
11.	"Renesmee's Lullaby / Something Terrible"	3:03
12.	"A Way with the World"	1:38
13.	"The Amazon Arrives"	1:00
14.	"A Yankee Vampire"	1:07
15.	"Cloud Forest"	1:23
16.	"Witnesses"	1:37
17.	"We Will Fight"	0:57
18.	"Shield Training"	2:09
19.	"At Bedtime a Child Asks About Death"	1:14
20.	"Decoding Alice"	1:45
21.	"The Driving Question"	1:09
22.	"Present Time"	2:11
23.	"This Extraordinary Life"	2:11
24.	"Gathering in Snow"	2:45
25.	"She Is Not Immortal"	0:53
26.	"Reading Edward"	0:55
27.	"Magnifica"	1:10
28.	"Irina Loses Her Head"	2:52
29.	"Aro's Oration"	2:48
30.	"A Kick in the Head"	0:58
31.	"Exacueret Nostri Dentes in Filia" (Sharpen Teeth on Daughter)	1:48
32.	"Chasing Renesmee"	1:20
33.	"A Crack in the Earth"	2:24
34.	"Aro's End"	1:52
35.	"That's Your Future"	0:52
36.	"Such a Prize"	3:25
Total length:		55:15

== Reception ==
Professional ratings
Review scores
Source	Rating
4music	4/5 stars
Allmusic	3.5/5 stars
Consequence of Sound	3.5/5 stars
Entertainment Weekly	(B)
Hitfix	(B−)
The Montreal Gazette	2.5/4 stars
Newsday	(B)

Based on four reviews, Metacritic assigned the Breaking Dawn – Part 2 soundtrack an average score of 74, indicating "generally favorable reviews". Heather Phares, reviewing for Allmusic, said "It's fitting that the film's soundtrack is dominated by ballads that feel like a long goodbye to Bella, Edward, and Jacob", and said "As with the other volumes of the series' music, however, this collection provides a surprisingly good showcase for female, indie-ish talent." Phares concluded, "While Breaking Dawn isn't one of the more dynamic Twilight Saga soundtracks, it is one of the more emotive ones, and just may help fans get some closure as one of the biggest film franchises of the 2000s and 2010s comes to a close."

== Charts ==
=== Weekly charts ===
Chart (2012)	Peak position
Australian Albums (ARIA)	11
Austrian Albums (Ö3 Austria)	10
Belgian Albums (Ultratop Flanders)	39
Belgian Albums (Ultratop Wallonia)	32
Canadian Albums (Billboard)	14
Danish Albums (Hitlisten)	21
Dutch Albums (Album Top 100)	70
French Albums (SNEP)	22
German Albums (Offizielle Top 100)	14
Hungarian Albums (MAHASZ)	30
Mexican Albums (AMPROFON)	28
New Zealand Albums (RMNZ)	24
Spanish Albums (Promusicae)	25
Swiss Albums (Schweizer Hitparade)	23
US Billboard 200	3
US Top Alternative Albums (Billboard)	1
US Top Rock Albums (Billboard)	1
US Soundtrack Albums (Billboard)	1

Chart (2026)	Peak position
Croatian International Albums (HDU)	5

=== Year-end charts ===
Chart (2013)	Position
US Billboard 200	90
US Top Rock Albums (Billboard)	20
US Soundtrack Albums (Billboard)	5
