= The Twilight Saga: Breaking Dawn – Part 1 (soundtrack) =

2011 album by various artists

The Twilight Saga: Breaking Dawn – Part 1 (Original Motion Picture Soundtrack)

Soundtrack album by Various artists
- Released: November 8, 2011
- Recorded: Various times
- Genres: Alternative rock, indie rock, pop
- Length: 61:15
- Label: Atlantic Records
- Producer: Alexandra Patsavas

Singles from The Twilight Saga: Breaking Dawn – Part 1 (Original Motion Picture Soundtrack)
- 1. "It Will Rain" Released: September 27, 2011; 2. "A Thousand Years" Released: October 18, 2011

The Twilight Saga: Breaking Dawn – Part 1 (Original Motion Picture Soundtrack) is the soundtrack album to The Twilight Saga: Breaking Dawn – Part 1. It is the fourth soundtrack in the saga's chronology, and was released on November 8, 2011. The soundtrack was once again produced by Alexandra Patsavas, the music director for the previous three films. The track list for the album was revealed on September 26, 2011, followed by the release of the album's lead single the following day.

== Background and development ==
In July 2011, Bill Condon, the director of the film, said that they were still under negotiations for the soundtrack and had 15 songs to choose from, but no deals had been signed with any artists. He also hinted that there was a good chance that the cast's musically-inclined members would feature on the soundtrack, which left chance for Robert Pattinson, Jackson Rathbone, Booboo Stewart and Jamie Campbell Bower to appear on it.

American rock band Evanescence expressed interest in landing a song on the Breaking Dawn soundtrack. Will Hunt, the drummer of the band, said, "I've been screaming for [new song] 'My Heart Is Broken' to land in that, because I think it would fit the story so well." Lead singer Amy Lee agreed, adding, "I think that would be awesome, actually." It is notable that the band had attempted to land songs on the soundtrack of Twilight, but Summit did not approve of the songs they presented. Evanescence were unsuccessful in lodging for a song to appear on the Breaking Dawn soundtrack.

On September 22, it was confirmed that the lead single of the soundtrack would be a song called "It Will Rain" by American pop singer Bruno Mars, released exclusively on iTunes on September 27. The track listing of the soundtrack was revealed on September 26, and is the first to not feature a contribution by British rock band Muse, who contributed songs to the past three soundtracks of the saga. The only cast member to appear on the soundtrack after the announcement of the possibility for musical cast members to be included is Mía Maestro, who plays Carmen.

== Track listing ==
Breaking Dawn – Part 1 – Standard edition
No.	Title	Writer(s)	Artist	Length
1.	"Endtapes"	Rhiannon Bryan; Rhydian Davies	The Joy Formidable	4:09
2.	"Love Will Take You"	Angus Stone; Julia Stone	Angus & Julia Stone	4:30
3.	"It Will Rain"	Bruno Mars; Philip Lawrence; Ari Levine	Bruno Mars	4:17
4.	"Turning Page"	Ryan Curtis O'Neal	Sleeping at Last	4:15
5.	"From Now On"	Matthew Edwin Pelham; Roger Dabbs; Rollum Haas; Mark Bond	The Features	3:21
6.	"A Thousand Years"	Christina Perri; David Hodges	Christina Perri	4:45
7.	"Neighbors"	Theophilus London; Greg Wells	Theophilus London	3:55
8.	"I Didn't Mean It"	Barbara Gruska; Ethan Gruska	The Belle Brigade	3:32
9.	"Sister Rosetta" (2011 version)	Daniel John Montagu Smith; James Ross Morrison; Shingai Elizabeth Maria Shoniwa	Noisettes	2:57
10.	"Northern Lights"	Andy Stochansky; Adam King; Shridhar Solanki; Simon Wilcox	Cider Sky	3:49
11.	"Flightless Bird, American Mouth" (Wedding version)	Sam Beam	Iron & Wine	4:27
12.	"Requiem on Water"	Laura Jane Scott; Leonard Jackson	Imperial Mammoth	2:23
13.	"Cold"	Matt Hales; Lucy Schwartz	Aqualung & Lucy Schwartz	3:40
14.	"Lloverá" (It's Going to Rain)	Mía Maestro	Mía Maestro	5:12
15.	"Love Death Birth"	Carter Burwell	Carter Burwell	6:03
Total length:				61:15

Breaking Dawn – Part 1 – Australia deluxe edition bonus tracks
No.	Title	Artist	Length
16.	"Like a Drug"	Hard-Fi	3:40
17.	"Turning Page" (instrumental)	Sleeping at Last	4:16
18.	"Eclipse" (All Yours)	Kevin Teasley	4:02
Total length:			73:13

Breaking Dawn – Part 1 – Digital deluxe edition bonus tracks
No.	Title	Writer(s)	Artist	Length
19.	"A Thousand Years" (Beyond the video)	Christina Perri; David Hodges	Christina Perri	3:27
Total length:				76:40

== The Twilight Saga: Breaking Dawn – Part 1 (The Score) ==
The Twilight Saga: Breaking Dawn – Part 1 (The Score)

Film score by Carter Burwell
- Released: December 13, 2011
- Genre: Orchestral
- Length: 52:37
- Label: E1 Music

Carter Burwell chronology
True Grit (2010)	The Twilight Saga: Breaking Dawn – Part 1 (The Score) (2011)	Seven Psychopaths (2012)

The score, like the original film, was composed by Carter Burwell, following Howard Shore, who scored Eclipse, and Alexandre Desplat, who scored New Moon. The album was released in North America on December 13, 2011 by Atlantic Records.

=== Track listing ===
No.	Title	Length
1.	"The Kingdom Where Nobody Dies"	1:36
2.	"Cold Feet"	2:44
3.	"What You See in the Mirror"	3:04
4.	"Wedding Nightmare"	1:09
5.	"Wolves on the Beach"	1:59
6.	"Goodbyes"	2:26
7.	"A Nova Vida" (The New Life)	2:57
8.	"The Threshold"	1:25
9.	"Pregnant"	2:09
10.	"Morte" (Death)	1:36
11.	"Honeymoon in Eclipse"	2:21
12.	"A Wolf Stands Up"	3:20
13.	"Two Man Pack"	0:32
14.	"Don't Choose That"	2:23
15.	"O Negative"	3:37
16.	"Hearing the Baby"	2:25
17.	"Playing Wolves"	3:15
18.	"Let's Start with Forever"	0:59
19.	"It's Renesmee"	2:29
20.	"The Venom"	1:04
21.	"Hearts Failing"	1:13
22.	"Biting"	2:25
23.	"Jacob Imprints"	1:13
24.	"You Kill Her You Kill Me"	2:11
25.	"Bella Reborn"	3:05
Total length:		52:37

== Reception ==
Professional ratings
Aggregate scores
Source	Rating
Metacritic	63/100
Review scores
Source	Rating
Allmusic	3.5/5 stars
Billboard	(positive)
Consequence of Sound	2/5 stars
Entertainment Weekly	B
Hitfix	C+
IGN	7.5/10
Los Angeles Times	2/4 stars
People	3/4 stars

Based on five reviews, Metacritic assigned the Breaking Dawn – Part 1 soundtrack an average score of 63, indicating "generally favorable reviews". Heather Phares, reviewing for Allmusic, said "Regardless of the strengths and failings of the Twilight Saga movies, their soundtracks captured the mood of each book perfectly", and said Breaking Dawn's soundtrack "follows suit, delivering more than a few love songs that are surprisingly angst-free compared to the previous soundtracks." Phares concluded, "Still, the most notable thing about [the soundtrack] is its unabashed romanticism, and the album more than serves its purpose as a Twilight-branded wedding playlist."

Entertainment Weekly critic Kyle Anderson stated of the soundtrack's second single, "'Jar of Hearts' songstress Christina Perri's fantastically opulent 'A Thousand Years' sets the tone for The Twilight Saga: Breaking Dawn—Part 1: stark acoustic strums, cascading strings, and a piercing croon expressing undying adoration." Despite awarding the album a B grade, Anderson noted, "If anything, this is the narrowest Twilight soundtrack yet: Even when the volume shifts from quiet to slightly less quiet, these weepy tunes about eternity and erotic mythical beasts grow wearisome."

In a mixed (two-out-of-four stars) review, Randall Roberts of the Los Angeles Times said of the featured songs, "As with all of the installments, half are good, half aren't — all depending on your mood and tolerance for soft rock." However, Roberts admitted, "Those uninterested in slow, weepy ballads should avoid like the plague the Imperial Mammoth, Sleeping at Last and Christina Perri songs, each of which will cause the vulnerable to melt."

For music site Consequence of Sound, Caitlin Meyer said that the Twilight soundtracks had "become a holiday in themselves", but said "Sadly, Breaking Dawn, Pt. 1 fails to follow suit, as it ultimately underwhelms, indulging too much in the melodramatic." Meyer finally noted, "At the end of the day, a whole collection of lethargic, clichéd songs is hardly a compelling listen[,] meaning that Breaking Dawn decisively should be Breaking Yawn and hopefully Part 2 is a little more inspiring."

== Charts ==
Breaking Dawn – Part 1: Original Motion Picture Soundtrack sold 105,000 copies in its first week in the United States, enough to debut at No. 4 on the Billboard 200. This is the first time that a soundtrack in the saga's chronology failed to debut in the top two positions, but it is the fourth in a row to debut in the top five. As of March 2012, the soundtrack has sold 467,000 copies in the United States.

=== Weekly charts ===
Chart (2011)	Peak position
Australian Albums (ARIA)	9
Austrian Albums (Ö3 Austria)	7
Belgian Albums (Ultratop Flanders)	49
Belgian Albums (Ultratop Wallonia)	19
Canadian Albums (Billboard)	16
Danish Albums (Hitlisten)	31
Dutch Albums (Album Top 100)	97
French Albums (SNEP)	32
German Albums (Offizielle Top 100)	8
Hungarian Albums (MAHASZ)	32
New Zealand Albums (RMNZ)	11
Norwegian Albums (VG-lista)	34
Polish Albums (OLiS)	47
Spanish Albums (Promusicae)	30
Swiss Albums (Schweizer Hitparade)	16
US Billboard 200	4
US Top Rock Albums (Billboard)	1
US Soundtrack Albums (Billboard)	1

Chart (2026)	Peak position
Croatian International Albums (HDU)	2

=== Year-end charts ===
Chart (2011)	Position
Australian Albums (ARIA)	75
Austrian Albums (Ö3 Austria)	59
German Albums (Offizielle Top 100)	92
US Top Rock Albums (Billboard)	58
US Soundtrack Albums (Billboard)	21

Chart (2012)	Position
US Billboard 200	62
US Top Rock Albums (Billboard)	17
US Soundtrack Albums (Billboard)	2

Chart (2021)	Position
US Soundtrack Albums (Billboard)	18

== Certifications ==
Region	Certification	Certified units/sales
Australia (ARIA)	Gold	35,000^{^}
Denmark (IFPI Danmark)	Gold	10,000^{‡}
New Zealand (RMNZ)	Platinum	15,000^{‡}
Singapore (RIAS)	Platinum	10,000^{*}
United Kingdom (BPI)	Gold	100,000^{‡}
^{*} Sales figures based on certification alone.^{^} Shipments figures based on certification alone.^{‡} Sales+streaming figures based on certification alone.
