= Strange & Beautiful (I'll Put a Spell on You) =

Single by Aqualung

from the album Aqualung
- Released: 16 September 2002
- Genre: Electronic; trip hop; piano rock
- Length: 3:52
- Label: B-Unique
- Songwriter(s): Matt Hales, Kim Oliver
- Producer(s): Aqualung, Marius de Vries

"Strange & Beautiful (I'll Put a Spell on You)" is the debut single by English singer-songwriter Aqualung, released in 2002 from his self-titled debut album. The song was used as background music for the Volkswagen Beetle advert in the UK in mid-2002. According to the sleeve notes of the album, the song, along with all the other songs were recorded entirely in Matt Hales' hallway.

"Strange & Beautiful" reached the top 10 of the UK Singles Chart, peaking at No. 7.

== Charts ==
Chart	Peak position
UK Singles Chart	7

== Personnel ==
- Matt Hales - vocals, piano, production
- Anthony Phillips - bass
- Marius de Vries - production, additional keyboards, programming
