= Kim Oliver =

British actress

- Occupation: Actress
- Years active: 1998–2007
- Spouse: Aqualung (? - present)

Kim Oliver is a retired British actress. She is perhaps best known for her role as the prison inmate Buki Lester in the TV drama series Bad Girls.

Oliver is married to the musician Matthew Hales, who is more widely recognized by his stage name, Aqualung.

== Filmography ==
Film
Year	Film	Role	Notes
1998	Blues Is My Middle Name	Faith	
Television
Year	Title	Role	Notes
2001–2003	Bad Girls	Buki Lester	Thirty-Eight Episodes: Series 3 - Series 5
2001–2003	Casualty	Zoe Preston and Cassie Beresford	Two Episodes: Life and Soul and Christmas Spirit
2003	Doctors	Amanda Raynor	One Episode: Love Hurts
2004	The Bill	Shauna Cole	One Episode: 357
2007	Party Animals	Journalist	One Episode: Episode No. 1.8
2007	Holby City	Ali Weller	One Episode: Countdown
