= A Lot like Love =

- Original poster
- Directed by: Nigel Cole
- Written by: Colin Patrick Lynch
- Produced by: Armyan Bernstein; Kevin Messick
- Starring: Ashton Kutcher; Amanda Peet
- Cinematography: John de Borman
- Edited by: Susan Littenberg
- Music by: Alex Wurman
- Production companies: Touchstone Pictures; Beacon Pictures
- Distributed by: Buena Vista Pictures Distribution
- Release dates: April 21, 2005 (Israel); April 22, 2005 (United States)
- Running time: 107 minutes
- Country: United States
- Language: English
- Budget: $30 million
- Box office: $42.8 million

A Lot like Love is a 2005 American romantic comedy-drama film directed by Nigel Cole and starring Ashton Kutcher and Amanda Peet.

The screenplay by Colin Patrick Lynch focuses on two individuals whose relationship slowly evolves from lust to friendship to romance over the course of seven years.

The film was released by Buena Vista Pictures Distribution in the United States on April 22, 2005, recovered its production budget and received mixed reviews from critics.

== Plot ==
Constructed as a series of chapters that take place at a turning point in each character's life, the story moves from seven years in the past, to three years, to two, and finally arrives in the present day.

Emily Friehl and Oliver Martin's first encounter is on a flight from LA to NYC. Impulsive, she jumps him in the restroom. Later she's aloof, but they cross paths again in the city and they spend a bit of time walking around, taking random shots with his camera.

Oliver has hopes of becoming an Internet entrepreneur and, certain of his future success, gives Emily his mother's phone number. He suggests she call him in six years to see if his prediction came true.

Three years later, facing the prospect of spending New Year's Eve alone as she's just been dumped, Emily finds Oliver's number on a piece of paper as she's rifling through her little address book. She calls him, and they meet for dinner. Emily takes him to a big New Years party with her friends. Seeing her most recent ex, she gets really drunk and leaves with Oliver. Emily passes out, but when she wakes in the morning, he's already left for San Francisco.

Thus starts a series of reunions with the passing of time, as each drifts in and out of relationships with others. Oliver and his business partner Jeeter develop their on-line diaper service, and Emily becomes a successful photographer.

Each time they meet they take turns, where one appears to be settled and content while the other is struggling to make headway in both life and career. Eventually, they come to the realization that each is exactly the person the other one needs for fulfillment.

A few years later, Emily gets engaged, but she still has feelings for Oliver. The night before she's meant to move in with her fiancé, after developing an old roll of film of when she met Oliver, she breaks it off. Then, her sister later sees Oliver at the drapers, getting fitted for a tux, and thinks he's getting married.

Upset, Emily goes to track down Oliver, who's at a wedding at his parents' house. He asks her what she is doing here, however, she leaves the house as the wedding is about to begin. He decides to go after Emily and kiss her. It then turns out the wedding is Ellen's, Oliver's sister. Seeing Emily's tears, Oliver wraps his arms around her, saying it was always you.

== Cast ==
- Ashton Kutcher as Oliver Martin
- Amanda Peet as Emily Friehl
- Kathryn Hahn as Michelle
- Kal Penn as Jeeter
- Ali Larter as Gina
- Taryn Manning as Ellen Martin
- Gabriel Mann as Peter
- Jeremy Sisto as Ben Miller
- Tyrone Giordano as Graham Martin
- Amy Aquino as Diane Martin
- Aimee Garcia as Nicole
- Moon Bloodgood as Bridget
- Lee Garlington as Stewardess
- Sam Pancake as Hipster at Party
- Norman Reedus as Emily's Ex At Airport (Uncredited)
- Meghan Markle as Natalie the "hot girl"

== Production ==
The film was shot on location in New York City, Los Angeles, and Antelope Valley.

=== Music ===
A Lot Like Love (Music from the Motion Picture)

Soundtrack album by Various artists
- Released: April 12, 2005
- Label: Columbia Records
- Producer: Butch Walker

A soundtrack album for the film was released by Columbia Records on April 12, 2005.

==== Track list ====
No.	Title	Artists	Length
1.	"Semi-Charmed Life"	Third Eye Blind	4:27
2.	"Walkin' on the Sun"	Smash Mouth	3:25
3.	"Save Tonight"	Eagle Eye Cherry	3:52
4.	"Mint Car"	The Cure	3:29
5.	"Mad About You"	Hooverphonic	3:43
6.	"Trouble"	Ray Lamontagne	3:59
7.	"Know Nothing"	Travis	2:59
8.	"If You Leave Me Now"	Chicago	3:56
9.	"Brighter Than Sunshine"	Aqualung	4:01
10.	"Hands of Time"	Groove Armada	4:21
11.	"Look What You've Done"	Jet	3:50
12.	"Breathe (2 AM)"	Anna Nalick	4:39
13.	"Maybe It's Just Me"	Butch Walker	3:20

== Critical reception ==
A Lot like Love received mixed reviews. Review aggregator Rotten Tomatoes gives the film a rating of 40%, based on 122 reviews, with an average rating of 5.00/10. The site's consensus states: "A tiresome rom-com."

Manohla Dargis of The New York Times said the film "isn't half bad and every so often is pretty good, filled with real sentiment, worked-through performances and a story textured enough to sometimes feel a lot like life. If nothing else, A Lot Like Love is a pleasant reminder of a Hollywood time, seemingly long gone, when boy met girl in a midlevel romantic comedy without arty aspirations . . . or low-brow yucks."

Roger Ebert of the Chicago Sun-Times observed, "The movie is 95 minutes long, and neither character says a single memorable thing. You've heard of being too clever by half? Ollie and Emily are not clever enough by three-quarters . . . To call A Lot Like Love dead in the water is an insult to water." Ebert awarded the film one out four stars, and ultimately included it in his list of "Most Hated Films".

Ruthe Stein of the San Francisco Chronicle said, "An unfortunate casting decision . . . comes close to sabotaging a witty script . . . As the sometimes couple, Ashton Kutcher and Amanda Peet are together in almost every scene, making it difficult to conceal the huge gap in their acting skills. Bland and with a small television face (words once used to describe David Caruso, but equally applicable here), Kutcher is incapable of doing the heavy lifting required to be a romantic lead . . . Peet, who has the looks and magnetism of a Kennedy offspring, makes Kutcher fade into the background, and you're left fantasizing what the movie might have been if Peter Sarsgaard had co-starred . . . Still, the movie is rich in the kind of details often left out because of a lack of budget or imagination."

Christopher Orr of The New York Sun said, "What do you call a shameless imitation of a shameless imitation? A rip-off squared? An homage once removed? Whatever label you choose, it can be comfortably affixed to A Lot Like Love, an Ashton Kutcher-Amanda Peet vehicle that is a lot like When Harry Met Sally..., which was itself a lot like Annie Hall. Sadly, the resemblance does not extend to quality. Indeed, those with a scientific turn of mind may take the devolution from Annie to Harry to A Lot Like Love as yet another demonstration of the Second Law of Thermodynamics, which says that in a closed system (an apt description of Hollywood if ever there was one) there is a tendency toward entropy - in this case, from acknowledged classic to memorable cable-television staple to dim, flabby dud . . . If one thing saves A Lot Like Love from disaster - and I'm not sure it does - it's an easy chemistry between the leads, though one that owes little to Mr. Kutcher's performance . . . Fortunately, Ms. Peet carries off the role of Emily with enough spark that even Mr. Kutcher gradually lights up . . . Since running away with The Whole Nine Yards five years ago, Ms. Peet has had altogether too little opportunity to showcase her sexy comic appeal. A Lot Like Love might have provided that opportunity, had it only featured something a little like a script."

Peter Travers of Rolling Stone rated the film two out of four stars, calling it "a lot like a lot of other romantic comedies that make two lovers of friends (When Harry Met Sally, Serendipity) and a lot not like the two witty and wise Richard Linklater movies - Before Sunrise and Before Sunset - that span the relationship between Ethan Hawke and Julie Delpy for nearly a decade and leave you wanting more . . . About A Lot Like Love leaving you wanting a lot less, I am right."

== Box office ==
The film opened on 2,502 screens in the United States on April 22, 2005. It earned $7,576,593 on its opening weekend, ranking fourth after The Interpreter, The Amityville Horror, and Sahara. It eventually grossed $21,845,719 in the US and $21,041,000 in foreign markets for a total worldwide box office of $42,886,719.

== See also ==
- Same Time, Next Year (film)
- List of films featuring the deaf and hard of hearing
