= 40th GMA Dove Awards =

2009 US music awards ceremony

- Date: April 23, 2009
- Location: Grand Ole Opry House, Nashville, Tennessee
- Hosted by: Rebecca St. James, Matthew West, and Lisa Kimmey

The 40th Annual GMA Dove Awards presentation was held on April 23, 2009 recognizing accomplishments of musicians for the year 2008. The show was held at the Grand Ole Opry House in Nashville, Tennessee, and was hosted by Rebecca St. James, Matthew West, and Lisa Kimmey.

Nominations were announced on February 20, 2009 by Lisa Kimmey, Dan Evans and Jackie Evans during a press conference at the Nashville Convention & Visitors Bureau Visitor Information Center in Nashville, Tennessee.

Steven Curtis Chapman won two awards, including Artist of the Year and Songwriter of the Year, while Tenth Avenue North won New Artist of the Year. Casting Crowns and Brandon Heath each won three awards. Other multiple winners include: Third Day, The Blind Boys of Alabama, and Michael W. Smith.

== Performers ==
Pre-telecast

- Meredith Andrews
- Downhere
- J.R.

Telecast ceremony

The following performed:

| Artist(s) | Song(s) |
|---|---|
| Mary Mary | "Get Up" |
| Kierra Sheard | "Invisible" |
| Francesca Battistelli | |
| Steven Curtis Chapman | "Cinderella" |
| Natalie Grant; Group 1 Crew | "Make It Matter" |
| Brandon Heath | "Give Me Your Eyes" |
| MercyMe | "I Can Only Imagine" "Finally Home" |
| Jonathan Nelson | |
| Remedy Drive | "Daylight Is Coming" |
| Chris Sligh | "Empty Me" |
| Tenth Avenue North | "By Your Side" |
| Third Day | "Revelation" |
| Chris Tomlin | "I Will Rise" |
| Kim Hopper; Brian Free & Assurance; Ronnie Milsap; Jason Crabb; Reba Rambo-McGuire; Dony McGuire; Destiny McGuire; Sandi Patty; Larnelle Harris | Tribute to Dottie Rambo: |
| Blind Boys of Alabama; Mac Powell | "Free at Last" |
| Edwin Hawkins; Donnie McClurkin; Mandisa; Phil Stacey; Melinda Watts | "Oh Happy Day" |

== Presenters ==
Telecast ceremony

The following presented:

- William Baldwin
- Chyna Vaughan (Chyna Phillips and Vaughan Penn)
- Sinbad
- A.J. Styles
- Mandisa
- Phil Stacey
- Casting Crowns
- Fireflight
- Michael W. Smith – introduced Steven Curtis Chapman
- Kirk Franklin
- Richie McDonald
- Ronnie Milsap
- Tye Tribbett
- Jeremy Camp
- Martha Munizzi
- Mary Alessi
- DecembeRadio
- GRITS
- Jason Crabb
- Kim Hopper
- The Afters
- Canton Jones
- Isaiah D. Thomas
- Marty Magehee
- Mark Harris
- Wayne Watson
- Damita Haddon
- Mac Powell – introduced the "Oh Happy Day" tribute
- Carrie Prejean – introduced MercyMe

== Awards ==
=== General ===
Artist of the Year

- Casting Crowns
- Steven Curtis Chapman
- Fireflight
- Marvin Sapp
- Third Day
- TobyMac
- Chris Tomlin

New Artist of the Year

- Addison Road
- Francesca Battistelli
- Fee
- Jonathan Nelson
- Remedy Drive
- Chris Sligh
- Tenth Avenue North

Group of the Year

- Casting Crowns
- David Crowder Band
- Ernie Haase & Signature Sound
- Mary Mary
- MercyMe
- Skillet
- Third Day

Male Vocalist of the Year

- Jeremy Camp
- Jon Foreman
- Ernie Haase
- Brandon Heath
- David Phelps
- Marvin Sapp
- Chris Tomlin

Female Vocalist of the Year

- Francesca Battistelli
- Brooke Fraser
- Karen Peck Gooch
- Natalie Grant
- Mandisa
- Sandi Patty
- Laura Story

Song of the Year

- "Amazing Grace (My Chains Are Gone)" – Chris Tomlin
  - Louie Giglio, Chris Tomlin, songwriters
- "Cinderella" – Steven Curtis Chapman
  - Steven Curtis Chapman, songwriter
- "Empty Me" – Chris Sligh
  - Chris Sligh, Clint Lagerberg, Tony Wood
- "Give Me Your Eyes" – Brandon Heath
  - Brandon Heath, Jason Ingram, songwriters
- "I Will Not Be Moved" – Natalie Grant
  - Natalie Grant, songwriter
- "I'm Letting Go" – Francesca Battistelli
  - Francesca Battistelli, Tony Wood, Ian Eskelin, songwriters
- Mighty to Save – Hillsong Church
  - Ben Fielding, Reuben Morgan, songwriters
- "Never Going Back to OK" – The Afters
  - Matt Fuqua, Josh Havens, Brad Wigg, Dan Muckala, songwriters
- "Reason Enough" – Ernie Haase & Signature Sound
  - Ernie Haase, Wayne Haun, Joel Lindsey, songwriters
- "You Reign" – MercyMe
  - Bart Millard, Barry Graul, Steven Curtis Chapman, songwriters

Songwriter of the Year

- Steven Curtis Chapman

Producer of the Year

- Brown Bannister
- Ed Cash
- Ian Eskelin
- Wayne Haun
- Bernie Herms
- Jason Ingram and Rusty Varenkamp

=== Pop ===
Pop/Contemporary Recorded Song of the Year

- "Cinderella" – Steven Curtis Chapman
- "Give Me Your Eyes" – Brandon Heath
- "I Will Not Be Moved" – Natalie Grant
- "I’m Letting Go" – Francesca Battistelli
- "This Is Home" – Switchfoot

Pop/Contemporary Album of the Year

- Bebo Norman – Bebo Norman
- Fall & Winter – Jon Foreman
- My Paper Heart – Francesca Battistelli
- Relentless – Natalie Grant
- Revelation – Third Day

=== Rock ===
Rock Recorded Song of the Year

- "Better Man" – DecembeRadio
- "For The Love Of The Game" – Pillar
- "Lost" – Red
- "Shine Like The Stars" – Stellar Kart
- "The Hunger" – Fireflight

Rock/Contemporary Recorded Song of the Year

- "Find You Waiting" – DecembeRadio
- "Keys To The Kingdom" – Group 1 Crew
- "Never Going Back To OK" – The Afters
- "Unbreakable" – Fireflight
- "Washed by the Water" – Needtobreathe

Rock Album of the Year

- Comatose Comes Alive – Skillet
- For The Love Of The Game – Pillar
- Satisfied – DecembeRadio
- Southern Hospitality – Disciple
- To Know That You're Alive – Kutless

Rock/Contemporary Album of the Year

- Daylight Is Coming – Remedy Drive
- Expect the Impossible – Stellar Kart
- Hello – After Edmund
- Never Going Back to OK – The Afters
- Unbreakable – Fireflight

=== Rap/Hip-Hop ===
Rap/Hip-Hop Recorded Song of the Year

- "Beautiful Morning" – GRITS, featuring Pigeon John
- "Do Yo Thang" – KJ-52
- "Joyful Noise" – Flame, featuring Lecrae & John Reilly
- "Pull Your Pants Up!" – Dooney “Da Priest”
- "So Beautiful" – Manafest, featuring Trevor McNevan

Rap/Hip-Hop Album of the Year

- Citizens Activ – Manafest
- Ordinary Dreamers – Group 1 Crew
- Pull Your Pants Up! – Dooney “Da Priest”
- Rebel – Lecrae
- Reiterate – GRITS

=== Inspirational ===
Inspirational Recorded Song of the Year

- "A New Hallelujah" – Michael W. Smith
- "For The Glory Of You" – Mark Harris
- "Bless The Lord" – Laura Story
- "Come Thou Fount" – Jadon Lavik
- "Dependence" – Jamie Slocum

Inspirational Album of the Year

- After The Rain – Aaron & Amanda Crabb
- Great God Who Saves – Laura Story
- Infinite Grace – Women of Faith Worship Team
- Roots Run Deep – Jadon Lavik
- Songs For The Journey – Sandi Patty

=== Gospel ===
Southern Gospel Recorded Song of the Year

- "Big Mighty God" – The Mike LeFevre Quartet
- "I Believe God" – Brian Free & Assurance
- "Reason Enough" – Ernie Haase & Signature Sound
- "Welcome To The Family" – Booth Brothers
- "Yahweh" – The Hoppers

Southern Gospel Album of the Year

- Ephesians One – Karen Peck & New River
- I Just Wanted You To Know – Kim Hopper
- Lovin' Life – Gaither Vocal Band
- On The Way Up – HisSong
- Room For More – Booth Brothers

Traditional Gospel Recorded Song of the Year

- "Cry Your Last Tear" – Bishop Paul S. Morton & the Full Gospel Baptist Church Fellowship Mass Choir
- "Deliverance" – Lillie Knauls
- "Free At Last" – The Blind Boys of Alabama
- "God Is Good" – Regina Belle
- "Souled Out" – Hezekiah Walker & LFC
- "Take It Back" – Dorinda Clark-Cole

Traditional Gospel Album of the Year

- A New Day – Paul Porter
- After 40 Years... Still Sweeping Through the City – Shirley Caesar
- Cry Your Last Tear – Bishop Paul S. Morton & the Full Gospel Baptist Church Fellowship Mass Choir
- Do It! – Dottie Peoples
- Down In New Orleans – The Blind Boys of Alabama

Contemporary Gospel Recorded Song of the Year

- "Favor Of God" – Martha Munizzi
- "Great Grace" – Alvin Slaughter
- "How Great Is Our God" – LaRue Howard
- "My Name Is Victory" – Jonathan Nelson
- "Shall We Gather at the River?" – Take 6
- "Waging War" – CeCe Winans

Contemporary Gospel Album of the Year

- Change the World – Martha Munizzi
- Stand Out – Tye Tribbett & G.A.
- The Sound – Mary Mary
- The Standard – Take 6
- Thy Kingdom Come – CeCe Winans

=== Country & Bluegrass ===
Country Recorded Song of the Year

- "Did I Make A Difference" – The Oak Ridge Boys
- "Good Side Of Goodbye" – Living Waters Trio
- "I Saw God Today" – George Strait
- "I Wish" – Point of Grace
- "Jesus and John Wayne" – Gaither Vocal Band

Country Album of the Year

- Around the Bend – Randy Travis
- Home For Now – Living Waters Trio
- Hymned Again – Bart Millard
- I Turn to You – Richie McDonald
- Runaway Train – Crabb Revival

Bluegrass Recorded Song of the Year

- "Help Is On The Way" – Doyle Lawson & Quicksilver
- "I See a Crimson Stream" – Janet Paschal
- "The Old White Flag" – Triumphant Quartet
- "They’re Holding Up The Ladder" – Jeff & Sheri Easter, The Lewis Family, and The Easter Brothers
- "What Will I Wear" – Kim Hopper

Bluegrass Album of the Year

- Bluegrass Worship – Various artists
- Help Is On The Way – Doyle Lawson & Quicksilver
- Hymns From Chigger Hill – Chigger Hill Boys & Terri
- I Don’t Regret A Mile – Larry Sparks
- Pickin’, Praisin’, & Singin’: Hymns From The Mountain – Cody Shuler & Pine Mountain Railroad
- We Are Family – Jeff & Sheri Easter, The Lewis Family, and The Easter Brothers
- What A Journey – Paul Williams & The Victory Trio

=== Praise & Worship ===
Worship Song of the Year

- "A New Hallelujah" – Michael W. Smith
  - Michael W. Smith, Debbie Smith, Paul Baloche, songwriters
- "Breathe On Me" – Natalie Grant
  - Natalie Grant, songwriter
- "Jesus Messiah" – Chris Tomlin
  - Chris Tomlin, Daniel Carson, Jesse Reeves, Ed Cash, songwriters
- "Mighty to Save" – Hillsong Church
  - Ben Fielding, Reuben Morgan, songwriters
- "You’re Not Alone" – Meredith Andrews
  - Meredith Andrews, songwriter

Praise & Worship Album of the Year

- A New Hallelujah – Michael W. Smith
- Great God Who Saves – Laura Story
- Hello Love – Chris Tomlin
- Opposite Way – Leeland
- The Invitation – Meredith Andrews

=== Urban ===
Urban Recorded Song of the Year

- "Declaration (This Is It)" – Kirk Franklin
- "Get Up" – Mary Mary
- "Love Him Like I Do" – Deitrick Haddon with Ruben Studdard and Mary Mary
- "No Looking Back" – Damita
- "Not A Slave" – J.R.

Urban Album of the Year

- Bold Right Life – Kierra Sheard
- The Fight of My Life – Kirk Franklin
- Kingdom Business – Canton Jones
- No Looking Back – Damita
- Revealed – Deitrick Haddon

=== Others ===
Instrumental Album of the Year

- A Treasury of Hymns – LaDonna
- Always There – Harold Rayford
- Born to Play – Barry D.
- The Chronicles of Narnia: Prince Caspian (soundtrack) various artists – Harry Gregson-Williams (composer)
- Love Beyond All Measure – Stephen Petrunak
- The Breath of Life – Angella Christie

Children's Music Album of the Year

- Absolute Modern Worship for Kids 4 – Various artists
- All God’s Animals – TJ McCloud
- David: Shepherd, Psalmist, Soldier, King! – Bible StorySongs
- Shout Praises Kids – I Am Free – Jeff Sandstrom, Kurt Goebel, Stephen Leiweke, and Jeremy Redmon
- Sleepytime Lullabies – Praise Baby
- Tell The World – Hillsong Kids

Spanish Language Album of the Year

- Abriras Las Puertas – Malin
- Alabanza y Adoracion: Del Corazon – Lucia Parker
- Mi Salvacion – Ingrid Rosario
- Refréscate! – Aline Barros
- Rescátame – Seventh Day Slumber
- Sobrenatural – Marcos Witt
- Tengo Sed de Tí – Soraya Moraes

Special Event Album of the Year

- Billy: The Early Years Official Motion Picture Soundtrack (Arista Nashville/Essential Records)
- Country Bluegrass Homecoming Volume One (Gaither Music Group)
- How Great Thou Art: Gospel Favorites from the Grand Ole Opry (Sony BMG Nashville)
- Passion: God of This City (Sixsteps Records)
- Your Name (Integrity Music)

Christmas Album of the Year

- Christmas Gaither Vocal Band Style – Gaither Vocal Band
- Christmas Songs – Fernando Ortega
- Home for Christmas – BarlowGirl
- O Holy Night – Sara Groves
- Peace on Earth – Casting Crowns

Choral Collection of the Year

- Cradle That Rocked The World – Geron Davis, Christopher Phillips, Jukka Palonen
- Glorious Day – David Moffitt, Sue C. Smith, Travis Cottrell
- He Still Leads – Christ Church Choir – Landy Gardner, Joy Gardner, Christopher Phillips
- I’ll Say Yes – Carol Cymbala
- Make a Joyful Noise – Regi Stone

Recorded Music Packaging of the Year

- ...Is My Friend – Hawk Nelson
- Remedy Club Tour Edition – David Crowder Band
- Revelation – Third Day
- Storm the Gates of Hell (Deluxe Edition) – Demon Hunter
- The Tide Will Swallow Us Whole – Trenches

=== Musicals ===
Musical of the Year

- Child of Wonder
- East to West
- God Bless the USA
- Savior
- The Risen Christ

Youth/Children's Musical

- An Island Christmas
- Angels We Have Heard
- It’s a Wonder-Full Life
- Lifesong
- The Christmas County Spelling Bee

=== Videos ===
Short Form Music Video of the Year

- "Daylight" – Remedy Drive
  - Andy & Jon Erwin (video directors)
- "Fan Mail" – KJ-52
  - Sam Sanchez (video director and producer)
- "In the Valley of the Dying Sun" – House of Heroes
  - Danny Yourd (video director), Steve Hoover (video producer)
- "Movin’" – Group 1 Crew
  - Andy & Jon Erwin (video directors), Dan Atchison (video producer)
- "Slow Fade" – Casting Crowns
  - Andy & Jon Erwin (video directors)

Long Form Music Video of the Year

- Alive and Transported – TobyMac
  - Eric Welch (video director), Tameron Hedge and Dan Pitts (video producers)
- Comatose Comes Alive – Skillet
  - Carl Diebold (video director), Diebold, Paul Kerby, and Zachary Kelm (video producers)
- Country Bluegrass Homecoming Volume One – Bill & Gloria Gaither
  - Doug Stuckey (video director), Bill Gaither (video producer)
- O Holy Night – David Phelps
  - David Phelps and Jimmy Abegg (video directors), Phelps, Abegg, Jim Chaffee, and Ben Pearson (video producers)
- The Altar and the Door Live – Casting Crowns
  - Andy & Jon Erwin (video directors)

== Artists with multiple nominations and awards ==
The following artists received multiple nominations:

- Seven: Chris Tomlin
- Five: Natalie Grant, Francesca Battistelli, Casting Crowns, Steven Curtis Chapman
- Four: Fireflight
- Two: TobyMac, Marvin Sapp

The following artists received multiple awards:

- Three: Casting Crowns, Brandon Heath
- Two: Steven Curtis Chapman, Third Day, The Blind Boys of Alabama, Michael W. Smith
