= Take Everything =

Studio album by Seventh Day Slumber
- Released: March 10, 2009
- Genre: Christian rock
- Length: 48:22
- Label: BEC
- Producer: Brent Milligan

Seventh Day Slumber chronology
Rescátame (2008)	Take Everything (2009)	The Anthem of Angels (2011)

Take Everything is the sixth studio album released by American Christian rock group, Seventh Day Slumber. Most of the songs are remakes of other artists songs done with different arrangement. Their song "Oceans From The Rain" was originally released on their 2005 album Once upon a Shattered Life. The Album peaked at No. 141 on the Billboard 200 and No. 11 on the Top Christian Albums charts. "Surrender" placed on the X 2009 Christian rock hits compilation.

== Track listing ==
Album release
No.	Title	Writer(s)	Length
1.	"How Great Is Our God" (Chris Tomlin cover)	Chris Tomlin; Jesse Reeves; Ed Cash	4:39
2.	"Surrender"	Traditional	3:23
3.	"Lead Me to the Cross"	Brooke Fraser	4:50
4.	"Everlasting God"	Brenton Brown; Ken Riley	4:37
5.	"Mighty to Save"	Ben Fielding; Reuben Morgan	4:01
6.	"From The Inside Out"	Joel Houston	4:02
7.	"I Can Only Imagine" (MercyMe cover)	Bart Millard	3:59
8.	"Take Everything"	Joseph Rojas	4:32
9.	"Carry Me"	Rojas	4:05
10.	"Famous One" (Chris Tomlin cover)	Tomlin, Reeves	4:26
11.	"Nothing But the Blood"	Traditional	5:19
12.	"Oceans From the Rain"	Rojas	4:29

== Personnel ==
Seventh Day Slumber

- Joseph Rojas – lead vocals, guitars
- Jeremy Holderfield – guitars, backing vocals
- Joshua Schwartz – bass
- Jamie Davis – drums

Additional musicians

- Brent Milligan – cello, backing vocals, arrangements
- David Angell – strings
- David Davidson – strings, arrangements
- Anthony LaMarchina – strings
- Pablo Oliveres – vocals (12)

=== Production ===
- Brandon Ebel – executive producer
- Brent Milligan – producer, tracking engineer
- David Biondolillo – tracking assistant
- J.R. McNeely – mixing
- Lee Bridges– editing
- Joe Causey – editing
- Troy Glessner – mastering
- Jeff Carver – A&R
- Randy Torres – A&R
- Ryan Clark – design
