= Crabb Revival =

- Genres: CCM
- Years active: 2008–2012
- Members: Adam Crabb; Zach Smith; Amanda Smith; Micah Schweinsberg; Jedidiah Richardson
- Past members: Terah Crabb

Crabb Revival is a Contemporary Christian music group.

== Career ==
Crabb Revival was formed by brother and sister, Adam and Terah Crabb, after the disbandment of The Crabb Family in 2007. The other members, Zach Smith and Micah Schweinsberg, were part of the Crabb Family band, while the final member, Jedidiah Richardson, is Adam and Terah's cousin. The band was signed to Daywind Records in February 2008 and they released their debut album, Runaway Train, on May 30, 2008. The album was critically acclaimed and received a Dove Award nomination.

In 2008, Zach's wife, Amanda, joined the band as a vocalist. The band then participated on Daywind's Live at Oak Tree series, releasing their second CD/DVD on March 31, 2009. On June 24, 2009, and after two years of touring, Terah Crabb announced she was leaving the band to become a full-time mother.

In February 2011, the band released their second studio album titled Going Places. The album is produced by Michael Sykes, and features songs written by Gerald Crabb and Clint Brown.

In 2014, it was announced that Adam Crabb had joined the Gaither Vocal Band.

== Discography ==
- Runaway Train (2008)
- Live at Oak Tree (2009)
- Going Places (2011)

== Awards and nominations ==
2008:

- SGN Music Awards – Breakthrough Artist of the Year
- Nominated for a Dove Award for Country Album of the Year at the 40th GMA Dove Awards
- Breakthrough Artist Award – Gospel Music Channel
- Southern Gospel Album of the Year, Honorable Mention in All Genres, Gospel Music Channel' Best of the Best 2008
