= Ridgeland High School =

Ridgeland High School is the name of many secondary schools in the United States, among them:

- Ridgeland-Hardeeville High School, in Ridgeland, South Carolina
- Ridgeland High School (Mississippi), in Ridgeland, Mississippi
- Ridgeland High School (Georgia), in Rossville, Georgia
