= David Into =

American racing driver

- Nationality: American
- Born: Ridgeland, South Carolina
- Died: April 20, 2015
- Teams: Fred Hughes
- Starts: 67
- Wins: 23

Championship titles
- 10× Oglethorpe Speedway Park Champion
- Military career
- Allegiance: United States of America
- Branch: Army
- Service years: 1962–1964

David Into (died April 20, 2015) is an American racing driver who won the NASCAR Weekly Series national championship in 1984.

Born in Ridgeland, South Carolina, Into has lived most of his life in Hardeeville, with the exception of a few years in Savannah, GA. He graduated from Ridgeland-Hardeeville High School in 1957, and attended the University of South Carolina in Columbia for a few years before joining the U.S. Army. He served from 1962–64, and upon returning home he pursued the field of architecture, becoming a draftsman.

== Racing career ==
Driving a Dirt Late Model for owner Fred Hughes, Into won 23 of the 67 races that he entered. Most were at Summerville Speedway in South Carolina and Oglethorpe Speedway Park in Georgia, with some at several other tracks in three states. Into won the track championship at Oglethorpe that year, starting a string of ten championships in eleven years there.

Into worked for the Savannah architectural firm of Gunn, Meyerhoff and Shay.
