= Picking up the Pieces (Seventh Day Slumber album) =

Picking Up the Pieces

Studio album by Seventh Day Slumber
- Released: April 8, 2003
- Studio: Michael Omartian Studios
- Genre: Christian rock
- Length: 49:12
- Labels: Word Entertainment, Crowne Music Group
- Producer: Seventh Day Slumber

Seventh Day Slumber chronology
Freedom from Human Regulations (2001)	Picking Up the Pieces (2003)	Once upon a Shattered Life (2005)

Professional ratings
Review scores
Source	Rating
Jesus Freak Hideout	2.5/5 stars
AllMusic	3.5/5 stars
Cross Rhythms	10/10
New Release Today	5/5 stars

Picking Up the Pieces is the third studio album by American Christian rock band Seventh Day Slumber. It was first released on April 8, 2003 on Word Entertainment, and then re-recorded and re-released upon their signing to BEC recordings on October 10, 2005. It sold 40,000 copies.

== Track listing ==
All lyrics are written by Joseph Rojas, except when noted; all music is composed by Seventh Day Slumber.

No.	Title	Writer(s)	Length
1.	"I Know"		3:49
2.	"Candy"		4:42
3.	"My Struggle"		4:26
4.	"Running Away"		3:02
5.	"Spiraling"	Rojas, Joshua Schwarz	3:01
6.	"Innocence"		3:33
7.	"More"		4:24
8.	"Picking Up the Pieces"		2:48
9.	"Something"		4:01
10.	"When the Children Cry"		3:56
Total length:			37:42

== 2005 Remastered Edition ==
Picking Up the Pieces

Studio album by Seventh Day Slumber
- Released: October 10, 2005
- Studios: Michael Omartian Studios, Spectre Studios, Earful Sound
- Genre: Christian rock
- Label: BEC
- Producer: Seventh Day Slumber

Seventh Day Slumber chronology
Once Upon a Shattered Life (2005)	Picking Up the Pieces (2005)	Finally Awake (2007)

No.	Title	Length
1.	"I Know"	3:49
2.	"Candy"	4:42
3.	"My Struggle"	4:26
4.	"Running Away"	3:02
5.	"Spiraling"	3:01
6.	"Innocence"	3:33
7.	"More"	4:24
8.	"Picking Up the Pieces"	2:48
9.	"Something"	4:01
10.	"When the Children Cry"	3:56
11.	"Out of Time" (Garage Days 1995-1998 bonus track*)	4:46
12.	"Miracle" (Garage Days 1995-1998 bonus track*)	4:08
13.	"I Wanna Believe" (Garage Days 1995-1998 bonus track*)	3:18
14.	"Matthew 25" (Garage Days 1995-1998 bonus track*)	3:42
15.	"Blindman" (Garage Days 1995-1998 bonus track*)	4:26
16.	"Here with You" (Garage Days 1995-1998 bonus track*)	4:35
Total length:		62:37

∗An EP compilation of early demos that the band recorded in their first years.

== Personnel ==
Credits adapted from Discogs.

=== 2003 version ===
Seventh Day Slumber

- Joseph Rojas – vocals, production, guitars
- Rusty Clutts – drums
- Joshua Schwartz – bass
- Jeremy Holderfield – guitars

Additional personnel

- Michael Omartian – additional guitars
- Chris Omartian – additional guitars
- Tony Palacios – mixing
- Richard Dodd – mastering
- Jim McCaslin – engineering
- Annette Reischl – layout

=== 2005 version ===
Seventh Day Slumber

- Joseph Rojas – vocals, guitar, engineering,
- Joshua Schwartz – bass
- Ryan Fryoux — drums
- Jeremy Holderfield – guitar

Additional personnel

- Tony Palacios – mixing
- Troy Glessner – mastering
- Jim McCaslin – engineering
- Brandon Ebel – A&R
