= Runaway train (disambiguation) =

A runaway train is an uncontrolled train.

Runaway train or Runaway Train may also refer to:

== Music ==
- "The Runaway Train", a 1925 song by Vernon Dalhart, popular on children's radio in the UK
- "Runaway Trains", a song by Tom Petty and the Heartbreakers from Let Me Up (I've Had Enough), 1987
- "Runaway Train" (Rosanne Cash song), 1988
- "Runaway Train" (Elton John and Eric Clapton song), 1992
- "Runaway Train" (Soul Asylum song), 1992
- "Runaway Train", a song by Geddy Lee from My Favourite Headache album, 2000
- Runaway Train (Kid Galahad EP), 2001, or the title song
- Runaway Train (Oleander EP), 2002, or the title song
- Runaway Train (Crabb Revival album), 2008, or the title song
- "Runaway Train", a song by Avantasia from The Wicked Symphony album, 2010
- "Runaway Train", a song by Brad Paisley from Wheelhouse, 2013

== Other uses ==
- Runaway! (1973 film), an American action thriller released abroad as The Runaway Train
- Runaway Train (film), a 1985 American action thriller film
- Runaway Train (roller coaster), an amusement ride at Chessington World of Adventures, London
- "Runaway Train" (Johnny Bravo), a 2001 episode of the American animated series
- "Runaway Train", a 2005 episode of Seconds from Disaster regarding a rail collision in Paris
- The Runaway Train, a 2010 audiobook based on the Doctor Who series
- "Runaway Train", a 2012 episode of Seconds from Disaster regarding a derailment in Japan
- Runaway Train, a 2000 mod for the video game Half-Life

== See also ==
- Runaway Mine Train (disambiguation)
- Unstoppable (2010 film), runaway train drama based on CSX 8888 incident
- Stop! That! Train!, 2026 action comedy disaster film
