= Aaron & Amanda Crabb =

- Genres: CCM
- Years active: 2007–present
- Website: takemetotheplace.com

Aaron & Amanda Crabb is a Contemporary Christian music duo.

== Career ==
Aaron Crabb met Amanda while touring as a member of The Crabb Family where he was a singer and bassist. They married October 3, 2001.

In August 2007, Aaron and Amanda decided to start a musical career together and on March 7, 2008 and signed with Daywind Records. They released their first album, After the Rain, nationwide shortly after signing. The album was critically acclaimed and nominated for one Dove Award.

In 2009, the duo filmed a special for Daywind's Live at Oak Tree series. The CD/DVD of the special was released on July 21, 2009. It received another Dove Award nomination for the duo.

Aaron & Amanda Crabb released their next album, Love With No End, in 2010.

In 2012, Aaron and Amanda signed with their current record label, Difference Media, and released their album Mercy followed by a Live DVD performance entitled Mercy Live in April 2013.

== Discography ==
- After the Rain (2007)
- Live at Oak Tree (2009)
- Love With No End (2010)
- Mercy (2013)
- Mercy Live (2013)
- Restore (2016)

== Awards ==
Aaron & Amanda Crabb have been nominated for a total of eight Dove Awards:

- At the 40th GMA Dove Awards, their debut album, After the Rain, was nominated for Inspirational Album of the Year.
- At the 41st GMA Dove Awards, their album, Live at Oak Tree, was nominated for Inspirational Album of the Year.
- At the 44th GMA Dove Awards, their song "Im Learning" was nominated for Song of the Year
- At the 44th GMA Dove Awards, their song "Im Learning" was nominated for Song of the Year
- At the 44th GMA Dove Awards, their song "Take Him to the Place" was nominated for Inspirational Song of the Year
- At the 44th GMA Dove Awards, their song "Take Him to the Place" was nominated for Southern Gospel Song of the Year
- At the 44th GMA Dove Awards, their album Mercy was nominated for Southern Gospel Album of the Year
- At the 44th GMA Dove Awards, their album Mercy was nominated for Country Album of the Year
