= After the Rain (Aaron & Amanda Crabb album) =

Studio album by Aaron & Amanda Crabb
- Released: January 1, 2007
- Genre: CCM
- Label: Daywind Records

Aaron & Amanda Crabb chronology
After the Rain (2007)	Live at Oak Tree (2009)

Professional ratings
Review scores
Source	Rating
AllMusic	(not rated)

After the Rain is the debut album from the Christian country duo Aaron & Amanda Crabb. The album was released on January 1, 2007.

== Track listing ==
All songs written by Aaron & Amanda Crabb, except where noted.

1. "After the Rain" – 5:04
2. "To Know You Are Near" – 4:48
3. "Thou Art Worthy" – 4:20
4. "Miracle" – 3:51
5. "Everything" – 3:52
6. "Not Ashamed" – 3:53
7. "Alpha Omega" – 4:15
8. "Give It All" – 3:38
9. "Strength" – 4:31
10. "God Will Make a Way" – 3:24
11. "Eli's Track" – 5:32

== Awards ==
After the Rain was nominated for a Dove Award for Inspirational Album of the Year at the 40th GMA Dove Awards.
