= Unseen: The Lion & The Lamb =

Unseen: The Lion and the Lamb

Studio album by Seventh Day Slumber
- Released: January 15, 2021
- Genres: Christian rock, CCM
- Label: Rockfest
- Producers: Kellen McGregor, Jeremy Holderfield

Seventh Day Slumber chronology
| Closer to Chaos (2019) | Unseen: The Lion and the Lamb (2021) | Death by Admiration (2022) |

Singles from Unseen: The Lion and the Lamb
- 1. "Eternity" Released: July 17, 2020; 2. "Run to the Father" Released: August 28, 2020; 3. "Unseen" Released: December 31, 2020; 4. "The Lion and the Lamb" Released: 2021

Unseen: The Lion and the Lamb is the twelfth studio album by American Christian rock band Seventh Day Slumber. It is their third worship album, and was produced by their former guitarist Jeremy Holderfield and Kellen McGregor of Memphis May Fire. It is their first effort with guitarist Weston Evans.

== Background ==
The band announced the release of Unseen in July 2020, with the album to be released as two EPs: The Lion and The Lamb. The Lion released on August 7, 2020, and The Lamb released on September 28, 2020. On January 15, 2021, the EPs were combined into a single album with two extra tracks.

== Critical reception ==
Professional ratings
Review scores
| Source | Rating |
|---|---|
| Jesus Freak Hideout | 3.5/5 stars |
| 365 Days of Inspiring Media | 3/5 stars |
| One Man In the Middle | 4/5 stars |

In their review for the Lamb EP which summarized the two EPs, Jesus Freak Hideout's James Larsen wrote, "Whether you want to combine both EP's to make a full record, or keep the two separate, both are solid offerings. The originals, while few and far between, are some of the band's best, and the covers are enjoyable listens. If you're looking for some worship to rock out to, or are fans of the band, Seventh Day Slumber has put together the project for you."

365 Days of Inspiring Media was more mixed in its review, stating that "if you’re looking for a lot of originality in these covers, then Seventh Day Slumber isn’t it- they’re too electric-gutiar driven and sound very formulaic- verse, chorus, verse, bridge, no room for a little bit of flexibility. But maybe you’ll hear this album and be impacted by it all…good on you, then."

One Man in the Middle's Robert Allwright says: "It is nice to hear some of these very familiar tracks done by a fantastic rock band, but it is a shame that much of this selection has already been done to death by other artists. We've all heard 'Reckless Love' in multiple styles, along with 'Lion and the Lamb' and 'Waymaker', not to mention the over-covered 'Oceans'. While I do like their interpretations of these songs there are many thousands of other tracks out there that are popular but haven't had the oversaturation of these particular worship songs, so it would have been nice to give them a chance to shine. Where this album really does stand out is actually in the original compositions which all show off the softer and more worshipful writing of this band. I particularly enjoyed the worship message of 'Branches' which could be used alongside a few other tracks like '100 Billion x (So Will I)' in a worship set. Overall, despite my griping above I did really enjoy this album and I hope that SDS will take the plunge and record more rock-worship as well as their own normal style albums because we still need that type of creativity too!"

== Track listing ==
The Lion
| No. | Title | Writer(s) | Length |
|---|---|---|---|
| 1. | "Lion and the Lamb" | Brian Johnson, Brenton Brown, Leeland Mooring | 4:31 |
| 2. | "Eternity" | Matt Arcaini, Kip Fox | 3:38 |
| 3. | "Reckless Love" | Cory Asbury, Caleb Culver, Ran Jackson | 4:48 |
| 4. | "Oceans" | Matt Crocker, Joel Houston, Salomon Lighthelm | 4:22 |
| 5. | "Holy Spirit" | Bryan Torwalt, Katie Torwalt | 3:46 |
| Total length: | | | 21:05 |

The Lamb
| No. | Title | Writer(s) | Length |
|---|---|---|---|
| 1. | "Waymaker" | Osinachi Okoro | 4:17 |
| 2. | "Unseen" | Arcaini, Fox, Josiah Prince | 3:16 |
| 3. | "Branches" | Arcaini, Fox, Prince | 3:44 |
| 4. | "What a Beautiful Name" | Brooke Ligertwood, Ben Fielding | 3:55 |
| 5. | "Run to the Father" | Cody Carnes, Ran Jackson, Matt Maher | 4:12 |
| Total length: | | | 19:24 |

The Lion and the Lamb bonus tracks
| No. | Title | Writer(s) | Length |
|---|---|---|---|
| 1. | "See a Victory" | Chris Brown, Ben Fielding, Steven Furtick, Jason Ingram | 5:58 |
| 2. | "I Need You" | Daniel Carson, Matt Maher, Christy Nockels, Jesse Reeves, Kristian Stanfill | 3:50 |
| Total length: | | | 50:17 |

== Personnel ==
Credits adapted from liner notes.

Seventh Day Slumber

- Joseph Rojas - vocals
- Weston Evans - guitar
- Ken Reed - bass
- Blaise Rojas - drums

Additional personnel

- Jeremy Holderfield - production, additional guitars, programming, keyboards
- Kellen McGregor - production, additional guitars, additional bass, programming, mixing, backing vocals
- Brad Blackwood - mastering
- Tiffany McGregor - backing vocals
- Jarob Bramlett - design
