= Runaway Mine Train =

Runaway Mine Train (and variants) may refer to:

- Mine Train roller coaster, a type of steel roller coaster whose trains depict a set of mine carts, including:
  - Runaway Mine Train (Alton Towers), Staffordshire, England
  - Runaway Mine Train (Six Flags Great Adventure), roller coaster located in Jackson, New Jersey, United States
  - Runaway Mine Train (Six Flags Over Texas), roller coaster located in Arlington, Texas, United States
  - River King Mine Train, known at one time as the River King Run-Away Mine Train, Six Flags St. Louis, Missouri, United States

== See also ==
- Runaway Train (disambiguation)
