= The Crabb Family =

- Origin: Beaver Dam, Kentucky, U.S.
- Genres: Christian; southern gospel
- Years active: 1996–2007, 2011–present
- Website: www.thecrabbfamily.com

The Crabb Family is a southern gospel group originally from Beaver Dam, Kentucky. They have had sixteen No. 1 songs on the national radio charts.

== Group history ==
The Crabb Family members consist of the oldest, Jason, twin brothers Adam and Aaron in addition to sisters Kelly and Terah. The group was formed in Beaver Dam, a town northeast of Central City, Kentucky. The family patriarch, Gerald Crabb, and his wife Kathy Crabb were the founders of the group. Kathy managed the group until their retirement in 2007. Throughout their career the group has released numerous albums and received several awards.

Although their roots are primarily southern gospel, the Crabb Family's recording, Blur The Lines features a blend of music genres. The Crabb Family also reached a vast concert audience and they have performed at the Grand Ole Opry.

=== Transition ===
In August 2006, the Crabb Family, Jason, Adam, Aaron, Terah and Kelly feeling that it was time for them to branch out into individual paths with their music beginning a new season in their lives. Each member has been launching separate ministries. The Crabb Family toured and thanked their fans for their unwavering support. Their last concert together was August 1, 2007.

Jason Crabb started a solo career and his brother Aaron began a duo with his wife Amanda simply called Aaron & Amanda Crabb, while Adam and Terah formed a band called Crabb Revival. In 2009, Terah decided to leave the band and focus on being a mother. Kelly Bowling joined her husband, Mike, as a member of The Bowling Family (formerly The Mike Bowling Group). In 2011, in addition to performing with his wife, Aaron became a founding member of the quartet Canton Junction, in which he sings lead. In 2014, Adam joined the Gaither Vocal Band.

The Crabb Family reunited for their Celebration Tour which ran from November 2011 through February 2012. A new album, Together Again, was released on February 7, 2012. The Crabb Family went on a sold-out tour in early 2015, celebrating 20 years of being in Christian music.

Kelly Bowling appeared as Nurse Kathy in the 2014 film Virtuous.

In 2020, Kelly and Mike Bowling divorced, and Kelly began singing with their daughters as Kelly Crabb and the Bowling Sisters.

=== Reunion album ===
On February 28, 2020, the family released their first album in eight years, entitled 20/20.

== Discography ==
=== Albums ===
Year	Album	Peak chart position	Record label	Record producer(s)
1996	Still Holdin' On		Zion Records	
1996	Alive & Kickin		Zion Records	
1997	Yesterday, Today, & Forever		MorningStar Records	
1998	Prayer in Motion		MorningStar Records	Woody Wright
1998	Live in Nashville		MorningStar Records	
1999	Crabb Grass		Family Music Group	
2000	Pray		New Day Records	Woody Wright
2000	Live from Kentucky		Crosscutt Records	
2001	Living out the Dream		Family Music Group	Mike Bowling
2003	The Walk	31	Daywind Records	Aaron, Adam & Jason Crabb
2004	Crabb Fest Live! 2003		Daywind Records	Gerald & Kathy Crabb
2004	Driven	13	Daywind Records	Aaron, Adam, Jason, Kelly, Jerry Yoder
2005	Crabb Fest Live 2004		Daywind Records	Kathy Crabb, Norman Holland, Eddie Leonard
2005	Live at Brooklyn Tabernacle		Daywind Records	Aaron, Adam, Jason, & Kelly
2005	The Locket		Eagle Records	Aaron, Adam, Jason, Mike Bowling, Ben Isaacs
2006	Blur the Lines	7	Daywind	Aaron, Adam, Jason, Kelly, Bubba Smith
2007	Letting Go	36	Daywind	Aaron, Adam, Jason, Tre Corley
2012	Together Again		Gaither Music Group	Jason Crabb
2020	20/20		Daywind	Jason Crabb

=== Compilations ===
- 1998: The Best of the Crabb Family
- 2001: A Crabb Collection (Daywind)
- 2005: Super Southern Gospel (Daywind)
- 2005: The Hits... Live (Daywind)
- 2015: 20 Years: Platinum Edition (Daywind)

=== Radio singles ===
The Crabb Family holds the record of having the second most No.1 songs on the Singing News Top 80 Radio Airplay Charts (The McKameys have the most.) They have fifteen songs which made those charts: "Please Forgive Me", "Trail of Tears", "The Lamb, the Lion, and the King", "I Sure Miss You", "Through the Fire", "That's No Mountain", "The Reason That I'm Standing", "Don't You Wanna Go?", "Please Come Down to Me", "The Walk", "The Cross", "Jesus Will Do What You Can't", "He Came Looking for Me", "Good Day", and "The Shepherd's Call." The group has had songs which were No. 1 on the Singing News yearly Top 40 Charts of the most played songs. "Please Forgive Me", "Through the Fire", and "The Reason That I'm Standing", are some of those songs.

Year	Album	Song
1996	Still Holdin' On	"Where We'll Never Die"
1996	Still Holdin' On	"Something Going on the Graveyard"
1996	Still Holdin' On	"I'm Still Holdin' On"
1997	Yesterday, Today & Forever	"I'm Running On"
1997	Yesterday, Today & Forever	"Please Forgive Me"
1998	Prayer in Motion	"Trail of Tears"
1998	Prayer in Motion	"Two Little Feet"
1998	Prayer in Motion	"The Lamb, the Lion, and the King"
1999	Crabb Grass	"I Sure Miss You"
2000	Pray	"Through the Fire"
2000	Pray	"When It's My Time"
2000	Pray	"Jesus in a Song"
2001	Living out the Dream	"That's No Mountain"
2001	Living out the Dream	"The Reason That I'm Standing"
2001	Living out the Dream	"Please Come Down to Me"
2003	The Walk	"The Walk"
2003	The Walk	"The Cross"
2003	The Walk	"Jesus Will Do What You Can't"
2003	The Walk	"Greater Is He"
2004	Driven	"He Came Looking for Me"
2004	Driven	"Good Day"
2004	Driven	"The Shepherd's Call"
2006	Blur the Lines	"Nothing but the Blood"
2006	Blur the Lines	"I'd Rather Have Jesus"
2007	Letting Go	"Child of the King"
2007	Letting Go	"Give It All to Him"

== Awards and honors ==
The Crabb Family received the "Favorite Band of the Year" award as voted by the Singing News readers in 1999, 2001, and 2003. The group has won numerous SGN Music Awards (presented by SoGospelNews.com) including Song of the Year, Mixed Group of the Year, and Album of the Year.

Jason Crabb was the recipient of the "Favorite Young Artist" award at the 2000 Singing News Fan Awards and "Male Vocalist of the Year" at the 2004 Harmony Honors and SGN Music Awards. Meanwhile, sister Kelly Bowling won "Female Vocalist of the Year" at the 2005 SGN Music Awards. Justin Ellis, the group's pianist, was awarded Musician of the Year in the 2007 SGN Music Awards.

The Crabb Family has been nominated for 22 Dove Awards and won 11. They have received three Grammy Award nominations.

GMA Dove Awards
Year	Category	Work	Result
2003	Southern Gospel Album of the Year	A Crabb Collection	Won
2003	Southern Gospel Song of the Year	"Don't You Wanna Go?"	Won
2004	Southern Gospel Album of the Year	The Walk	Won
2004	Southern Gospel Song of the Year	"The Cross"	Won
2005	Group of the Year	—	Nominated
2005	Song of the Year	"Through the Fire"	Nominated
2005	Inspirational Recorded Song of the Year	"You Can't Imagine"	Nominated
2005	Southern Gospel Recorded Song of the Year	"He Came Looking for Me"	Won
2005	Southern Gospel Album of the Year	Driven	Won
2005	Traditional Gospel Recorded Song of the Year	"Through the Fire"	Won
2005	Country Recorded Song of the Year	"Forever"	Won
2006	Inspirational Recorded Song of the Year	"Holy Ground"	Nominated
2006	Southern Gospel Recorded Song of the Year	"Greater Is He"	Nominated
2006	Southern Gospel Recorded Song of the Year	"Through the Fire"	Won
2006	Southern Gospel Album of the Year	Live at Brooklyn Tabernacle	Won
2006	Long Form Music Video of the Year	Live at Brooklyn Tabernacle	Nominated
2007	Artist of the Year	—	Nominated
2007	Inspirational Album of the Year	Blur the Lines	Nominated
2007	Southern Gospel Recorded Song of the Year	"Nothing But the Blood"	Nominated
2007	Traditional Gospel Recorded Song of the Year	"Can't Nobody do Me Like Jesus"	Won
2008	Contemporary Gospel Recorded Song of the Year	"You Saved Me"	Nominated
2012	Southern Gospel Recorded Song of the Year	"If There Ever Was A Time"	Nominated

Grammy Awards nominations
Year	Category	Work
2004	Best Southern, Country, or Bluegrass Gospel Album	The Walk
2005	Best Southern, Country, or Bluegrass Gospel Album	Driven
2006	Best Southern, Country, or Bluegrass Gospel Album	Live at Brooklyn Tabernacle

== Video ==
- 2003: #1 Hits Live (Eagle Vision)
- 2004: Crabb Fest Live 2003 (Word Records)
- 2005: Live at Brooklyn Tabernacle (Daywind Records)
- 2005: Remembering The Greats (Daywind)
- 2009: The Best of the Crabb Family (Spring House Records)
- 2009: Grand Finale: The Ultimate Concert Experience (Provident Music)

=== Gaither Homecoming video performances ===
- 2001: What a Time: "Please Forgive Me"
- 2001: Glorious Church: "That's No Mountain" (released in 2021)
- 2002: New Orleans Homecoming: "Through The Fire"
- 2002: God Bless America: "The Lion, The Lamb, And The King"
- 2003: Red Rocks Homecoming: "The Reason That I'm Standing"
- 2003: Dottie Rambo with the Homecoming Friends: "Tears Will Never Stain The Streets Of That City"
- 2003: Build A Bridge: "Greater Is He In Me"
- 2007: How Great Thou Art: "I'd Rather Have Jesus"
