= Rescátame =

Studio album by Seventh Day Slumber
- Released: May 27, 2008
- Genre: Christian Rock
- Label: BEC
- Producer: Brent Milligan

Seventh Day Slumber chronology
Finally Awake (2007)	Rescátame (2008)	Take Everything (2009)

Rescátame is a Spanish album released by American Christian rock group Seventh Day Slumber. The album features Spanish versions of songs from their previous three albums with BEC Recordings.

== Production and recording ==
According to singer Joseph Rojas, the band decided to record a Spanish album to "get this message out to the masses." Latin singer Soraya helped the band with the translation and production of the album, after identifying with the band's song "Caroline". Soraya died from breast cancer just after finishing her work on that song, and the band dedicated it to her memory. The album also features Argentine singer Pablo Olivares on the song "On My Way Home".

== Track listing ==
1. "Desperté" (Holderfield, Rojas) - 3:41
2. "Hombre Nuevo" (Rojas) - 4:06
3. "Nadie Te Conoce Ya" (Rojas, Shea) - 3:48
4. "De Camino a Casa" (Rojas, Schwartz) - 3:40
5. "Rescátame" (Holderfield, Rojas, Schwartz) - 3:24
6. "Carolina" (Rojas) - 4:05
7. "Quisieron Quebrarme" (Holderfield, Rojas) - 3:18
8. "Sábados" (Rojas, Shea) - 4:17
9. "Quemando Puentes" (Rojas, Shea) - 3:52
10. "Haces Mares Al Llover" (Rojas, VanViel) - 4:09

== Awards ==
The album won a Dove Award for Spanish Language Album of the Year at the 40th GMA Dove Awards.
