= Seventh Day Slumber =

American band

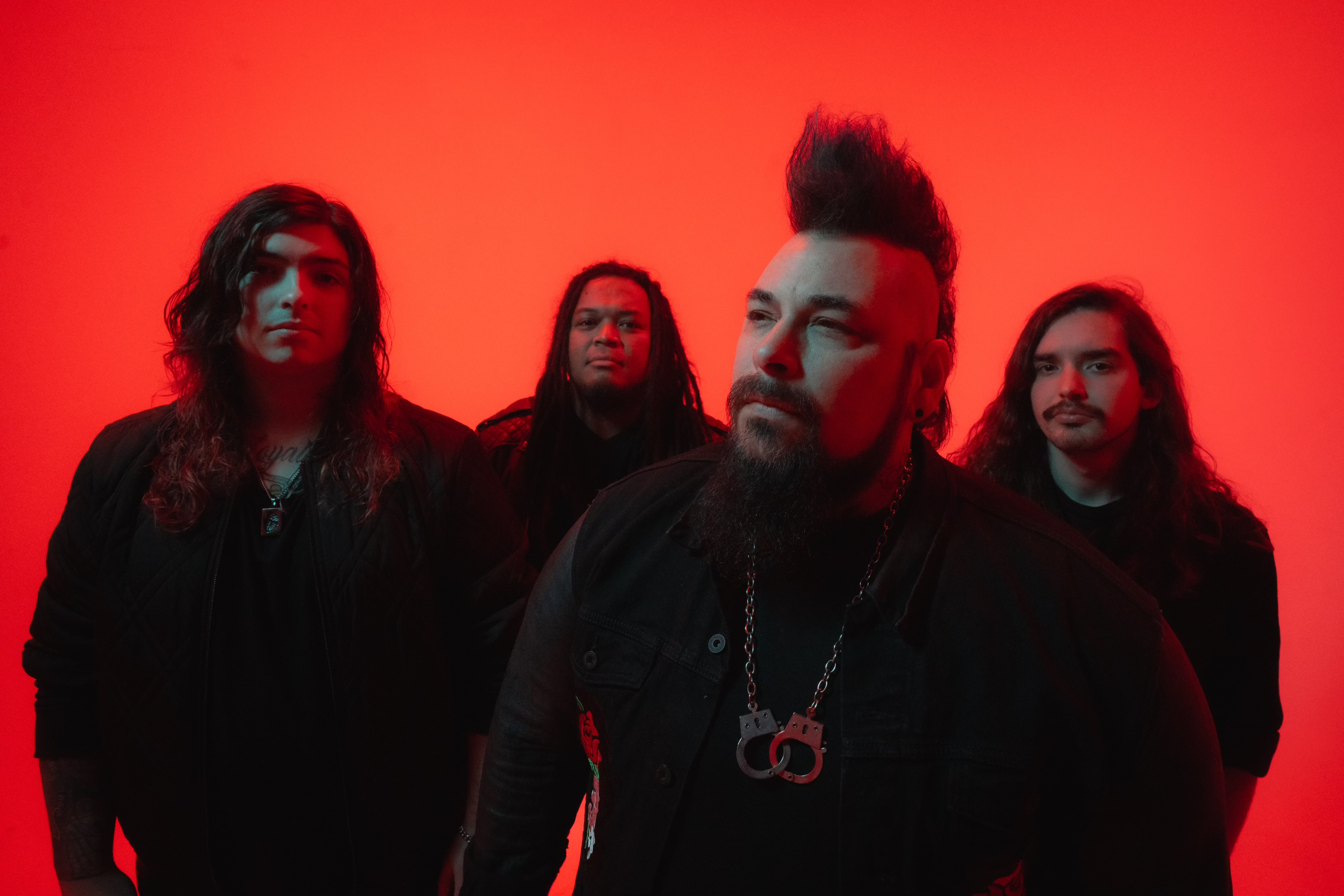

Background information
- Origin: Dallas, Texas, U.S.
- Genres: Christian rock; hard rock; post-grunge; alternative metal; melodic metalcore
- Years active: 1996–present
- Labels: BEC; Word; Mercy Street Records; Afinia; RockFest
- Members: Joseph Rojas; Blaise Rojas; Weston Evans; Zack Gallipeau
- Past members: Jeremy Holderfield; Talia Haughn; Ray Fryoux; Elliot Lopes; Rusty Clutts; Tim Parady; Juan Alvarez; Joshua Schwartz; Jamie Davis; Ken Reed
- Website: www.seventhdayslumber.com

Seventh Day Slumber is an American Christian rock band from Dallas, Texas, formed in 1996, consisting of vocalist Joseph Rojas, his son Blaise on drums, guitarist Zack Gallipeau, and bassist Weston Evans. They were an independent band for five years until they signed with BEC Records in 2005, then finished their contract in 2012 and partnered with Capitol CMG to start their own record label called Rockfest Records. Their songs have been featured frequently on X the album series.

== History ==
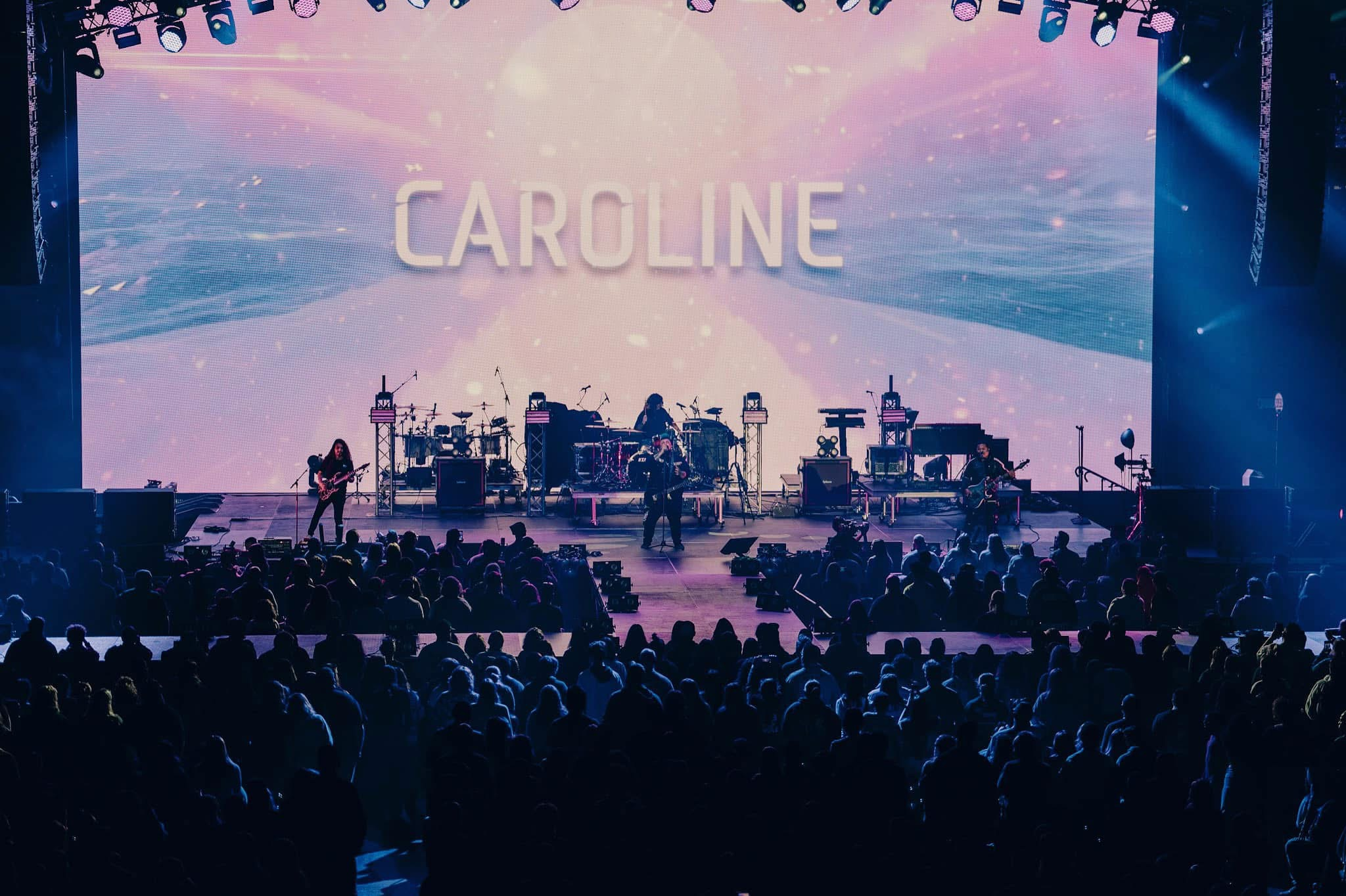

Joseph Rojas tried to commit suicide following a cocaine binge, and became a Christian while being taken to the hospital in an ambulance. Joseph Rojas and Bernie Dufrene formed Seventh Day Slumber in the summer of 1996 at Christ for the Nations Institute in Dallas, Texas, where they met, wrote, and raised money for their first four-song demo project. The band was later signed to BEC Recordings. He teamed with guitarist Evan Weatherford, bassist Joshua Schwartz and drummer Adam Witte. After signing to the Afinia label the group issued Matthew Twenty-Five three years later. Their second album Freedom From Human Regulations was also released on an independent album before they made their major-label debut with Picking up the Pieces in 2003.

Seventh Day Slumber released Once upon a Shattered Life in 2005 which spanned their hit singles "Caroline" and "Oceans from the Rain". The album hit No. 1 on the Billboard Heatseekers Albums chart and No. 26 on the Top Christian Albums chart. After re-releasing Picking Up the Pieces that same year, they released Finally Awake in 2007. It peaked at No. 16 on Billboard's Top Christian Albums chart. The Spanish-language album Rescátame contained re-recordings of previous songs and it won the 2009 Dove Award for Spanish Language Album of the Year at the 40th GMA Dove Awards. It was followed by Take Everything, an album of new arrangements of Christian music worship songs. The album peaked at No. 141 on the Billboard 200 and No. 11 on the Top Christian Albums charts. The Anthem of Angels was released in November 2011. The "Small Town America Tour" ran from August 2011 to February 2012 to promote the album.

On March 12, 2013, the band issued Love & Worship, their second worship album featuring covers of contemporary Christian songs and originals. Afterwards, on May 13, 2014, they released We Are the Broken, then toured in the fall of that year with DavsEye and Nine Lashes.

On 9 October, SDS released an EP, Redline, which featured a cover of Temple of the Dog's "Hunger Strike" with Disciple vocalist Kevin Young guesting; they then co-headlined with Fireflight for the Small Town America Tour with guests Shonlock and Scarlet White. In 2015, Joseph's oldest son Blaise joined the band as their drummer. On July 28, 2017, Found, the tenth studio album by the band, was released.

After a period of touring, Joseph Rojas announced in a broadcast on October 30, 2018, the release of Closer to Chaos on May 31, 2019, and its guesting songwriters, including Josiah Prince of Disciple and Kellen McGregor of Memphis May Fire. On August 7, 2020, SDS dropped a worship EP, Unseen - The Lion, which was followed by a companion, Unseen - The Lamb, on September 24, 2020, and both were combined into a single album on January 15, 2021, with two bonus tracks. Successively on June 1, the first single for their thirteenth recording, Death By Admiration, "What I've Become" was dropped; the album was released on January 28, 2022. A music video for the title track, which featured Tyler Smith of The Word Alive as guest vocalist and co-songwriter, was released on March 4, 2022.

On February 10, 2023, SDS released a single, "Surviving the Wasteland". After a second single—"A Bullet Meant for Me"—released on July 7, 2023, SDS announced the September 22nd release of their single Feasting on Vultures, which featured Kellin Quinn. The album, Fractured Paradise, was released on March 15, 2024. In May 2025 a deluxe edition of the album was released, consisting of five bonus tracks, with one featuring Brook Reeves of Impending Doom and another guesting Paul McCoy of 12 Stones.

== Activities ==
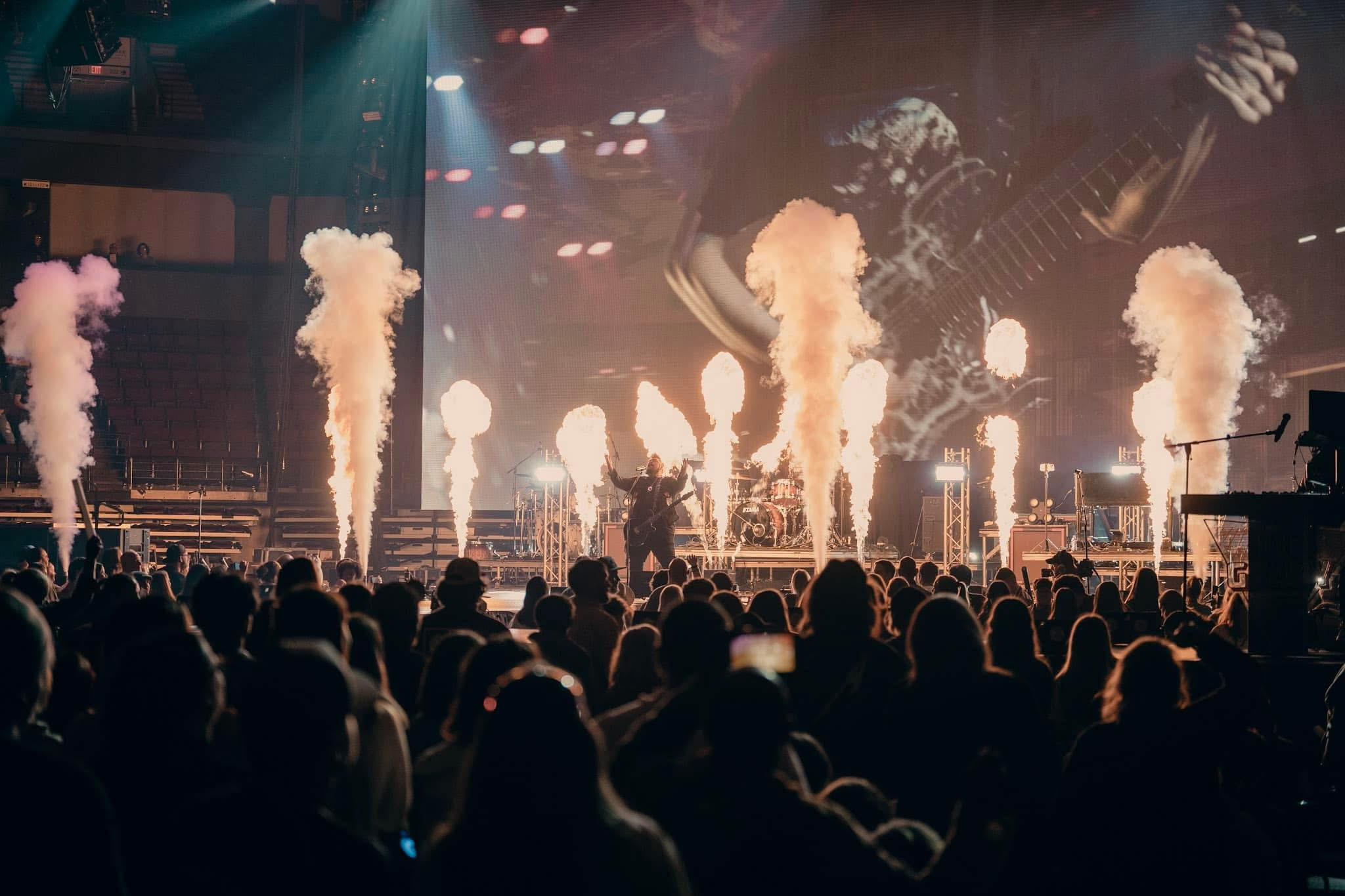

Joseph Rojas began hosting a national-syndicated radio program in 2015. In April 2018, Rojas formed a new record group called Nashville Label Group. Seventh Day Slumber signed with the group's RockFest Records.

== Etymology and influences ==
The band's name Seventh Day Slumber comes from Genesis 2:2 where on the seventh day, after creating the universe, God rested. The band's influences include Soundgarden, Stone Temple Pilots, Alice in Chains, and Metallica.

== Members ==
- Joseph Rojas – Vocals, Guitar (1996–Present)
- Blaise Rojas – Drums (2014–Present)
- Zack Gallipeau – Guitar (2024–Present)
- Weston Evans – Guitar (2019–2024), Bass (2025–Present)

Current Touring Musicians

- Jason Wayne – Guitar (2024–present)

Former Touring Musicians

- Elijah Gallinger — Bass (2023)
- Marco Pera — Guitar (2018–2020)
- Zac “Cheese” Cheesman — Guitar (2024–2025)

Former Members

- Jeremy Holderfield – Guitar (2001–2020)
- Talia Haughn-Comer – Bass (2011–2012)
- Joshua Schwartz – Bass (1996–2011)
- Ray Fryoux – Drums (2004–2009)
- Elliot Lopes – Drums (2009)
- Rusty Clutts – Drums (2000–2003)
- Tim Parady – Keyboards, vocals
- Juan Alvarez – Drums (2003–2004)
- Jamie Davis – Drums (2009–2014)
- Bernie Dufrene - Drums (1996)
- Ken Reed – Bass (2013–2025)

== Discography ==
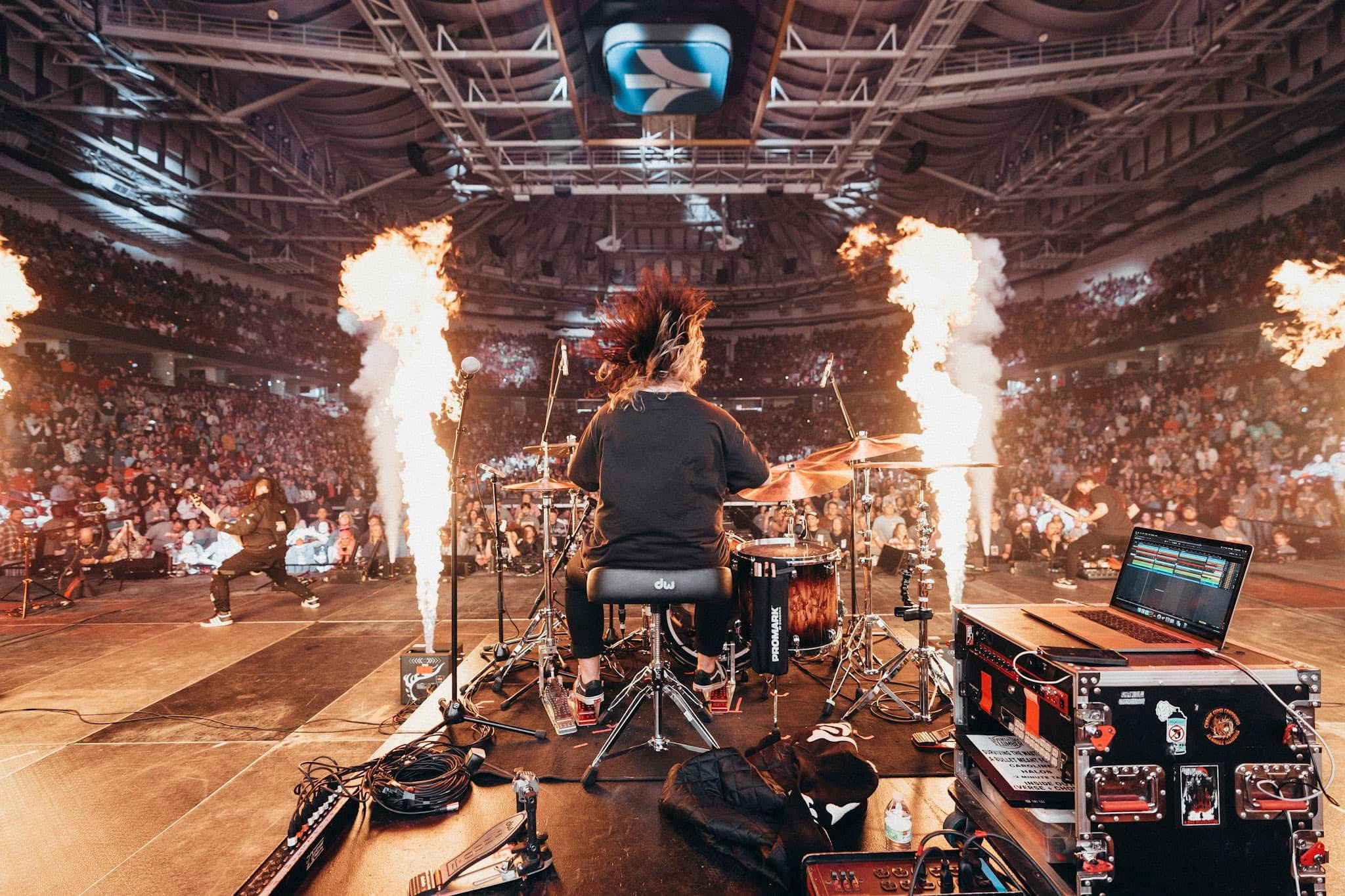

Studio albums

- Matthew Twenty Five (1999)
- Freedom from Human Regulations (2001)
- Picking up the Pieces (2003) (rerelease 2005)
- Once Upon a Shattered Life (2005)
- Finally Awake (2007)
- Take Everything (2009)
- The Anthem of Angels (2011)
- Love & Worship (2013)
- We Are the Broken (2014)
- Found (2017)
- Closer to Chaos (2019)
- Unseen: The Lion & The Lamb (2021)
- Death by Admiration (2022)
- Fractured Paradise (2024)
- Thy Kingdom Come (2026)

EPs

- Redline EP (2015)
- Unseen: The Lion (2020)
- Unseen: The Lamb (2020)

Compilations

- Rescátame (May 27, 2008)
- A Decade of Hope (March 29, 2011) (contains full albums Picking Up the Pieces, Once Upon a Shattered Life, and Finally Awake)

Billboard charting albums (United States)

Year	Album	Chart	Position
2005	Once Upon a Shattered Life	Top Heatseekers	1
2005	Once Upon a Shattered Life	Top Christian Albums	26
2007	Finally Awake	Top Heatseekers	62
2007	Finally Awake	Top Christian Albums	16
2007	Finally Awake	Top Christian & Gospel Albums	1
2009	Take Everything	Top Christian Albums	11
2009	Take Everything	Billboard 200	141

== Singles ==
Titles	Year	Album
"Caroline"	2005	Once Upon a Shattered Life
"Make Believe"	2005	Once Upon a Shattered Life
"Oceans From the Rain"	2006	Once Upon a Shattered Life
"Awake"	2007	Finally Awake
"Always"	2007	Finally Awake
"Surrender"	2009	Take Everything
"From the Inside Out"	2009	Take Everything
"How Great Is Our God"	2010	Take Everything
"Love Came Down"	2011	The Anthem of Angels
"Never Too Far Gone"	2011	The Anthem of Angels
"One Mistake"	2011	The Anthem of Angels
"Wasted Life"	2012	The Anthem of Angels
"10,000 Reasons"	2013	Love & Worship
"Our God"	2013	Love & Worship
"I Am Not the Same"	2013	Love & Worship
"We Are the Broken"	2014	We Are the Broken
"Trust In Me"	2015	We Are the Broken
"Sky Is Falling"	2017	Found
"Horizon"	2018	Found
"Alive Again"	2019	Closer to Chaos
"Man Down"	2019	Closer to Chaos
"Still Breathing"	2019	Closer to Chaos
"Eternity"	2020	Unseen: The Lion and the Lamb
"Unseen"	2020	Unseen: The Lion and the Lamb
"Lion and the Lamb"	2021	Unseen: The Lion and the Lamb
"What I've Become"	2021	Death by Admiration
"Death By Admiration" (feat. The Word Alive)	2022	Death by Admiration
"Halos"	2022	Death by Admiration
"Fatal Love"	2023	Death by Admiration
"Surviving the Wasteland"	2023	Fractured Paradise
"A Bullet Meant for Me"	2023	Fractured Paradise
"Feasting on Vultures" (feat. Kellin Quinn)	2023	Fractured Paradise
"My Novocain"	2024	Fractured Paradise
"Black Roses White Doves"	2025	Fractured Paradise: Garden of Shadows
"Savior Machine"	2025	Fractured Paradise: Garden of Shadows
"Garden of Shadows"	2025	Fractured Paradise: Garden of Shadows
"Left Behind (Kirk Cameron)"	2025	Fractured Paradise: Garden of Shadows
"You Say"	2025	Thy Kingdom Come
"Praise" (Elevation Worship cover)	2026	Thy Kingdom Come
"Peace Be Mind" (original or with Kutless)	2026	Thy Kingdom Come

== Music videos ==
Titles	Albums	Link
"Candy"	Picking Up the Pieces	YouTube Go
"Caroline"	Once Upon a Shattered Life	YouTube Go
"Awake"	Finally Awake	YouTube Go
"Surrender"	Take Everything	YouTube Go
"Wasted Life"	The Anthem of Angels	YouTube Go
"Death By Admiration"	Death By Admiration	YouTube Go
"Halos"	Death By Admiration	YouTube Go
"Peace Be Still"	Thy Kingdom Come	
