= SoGospelNews.com =

E-zine based on Southern Gospel Music

AbsolutelyGospel.com
- Former name: SoGospelNews.com
- Website type: E-zine
- Available in: English
- Founded: 1997
- Headquarters: Murfreesboro, Tennessee
- Country of origin: United States of America
- CEO: Deon Unthank
- Current status: Active

AbsolutelyGospel.com (formerly known as SoGospelNews.com) is an e-zine based on Southern Gospel Music.

== History ==
The site was formed in 1997 by Deon & Susan Unthank, then of Southaven, Mississippi. The site was birthed from an email discussion group by the same name. The SoGospelNews email discussion list was created by the Unthanks after the Singing News shut down its discussion list.

SoGospelNews started as a simple webpage listing artists, fans, individuals, etc. that were avid supporters of the newly formed SoGospelNews talk list. The site eventually took on printing news for Southern Gospel artists, and eventually took on reviewing the latest recordings from both signed and independent artists within the small genre. SoGospelNews became the most viewed Southern Gospel website on the Internet with over 4,000,000 hits per month.

The Unthank family are now involved in the site, as well as the addition of several staff writers. The website is based out of Murfreesboro, Tennessee.

In April 2010, SoGospelNews changed its name to AbsolutelyGospel.com.

On 5 January 2011, Susan Unthank died, leaving the website in control of Deon, their son, Chris, and their daughter Amy.

== Content ==
The site contains an active Southern Gospel message board forum, bi-weekly feature articles and interviews, bi-weekly album and DVD reviews, opinion columns, editorials, monthly artist articles, devotions, youth articles, a free chat room, staff blogs, and much more in addition to reporting news daily. The website also has a weekly music chart, which uses a mixture of fan voting and radio airplay to calculate its rankings.

== Shows and events ==
The site hosts two annual events: the AGM Music Awards Celebration, and the Absolutely Gospel Music Fan Festival.

The Absolutely Gospel Music Fan Festival is a week-long series of concerts that is sponsored by AbsolutelyGospel.com. The event is held the last week of July and has now expanded to five days of Southern Gospel music. The event is free to the public. The event various Southern Gospel artists, including the Crabb Family, Talley Trio, Gold City, Karen Peck and New River, The Kingsmen, LordSong, Mike Bowling, Booth Brothers, Dove Brothers Quartet, The Imperials, McRaes, and many more.

The AGM Music Awards were founded in 2002 by the staff of AbsolutelyGospel.com. The award nominations are chosen by the staff of AbsolutelyGospel.com, and most of the winners are then chosen by the fans of the genre and readers of the site. In 2005, AbsolutelyGospel.com held its first AGM Music Awards Celebration which brought in all the artists, industry professionals, and fans for an official awards ceremony. In 2006, AbsolutelyGospel.com held a contest for the readers to name the statue that is presented to the winners at the Awards Celebration, in which "Ovation" was chosen as the winner. The Ovations are handed out on the third Tuesday in April every year.
