= Found (Seventh Day Slumber album) =

Studio album by Seventh Day Slumber
- Released: July 28, 2017
- Genres: Christian rock, CCM, hard rock
- Label: VSR Records
- Producer: Jeremy Holderfield

Seventh Day Slumber chronology
Redline (2015)	Found (2017)	Closer to Chaos (2019)

Singles from Found
- 1. "Sky Is Falling" Released: 2017; 2. "Horizon" Released: 2017

Found is the tenth studio album by American Christian rock band Seventh Day Slumber. It was produced by guitarist Jeremy Holderfield, and was released on July 28, 2017 under VSR Records.

== Composition ==
According to singer Joseph Rojas, the album's conception stemmed from a period of depression. "I never lost my passion for ministry, or anything like that, but I just couldn’t make myself be happy...I just decided to write about it. I decided to just put my heart and my soul into these lyrics...That’s what this record, Found, is about.”

== Critical reception ==
Professional ratings
Review scores
Source	Rating
Jesus Freak Hideout	4/5 stars
One Man in the Middle	4/5 stars
Jesus Wired	91%
CCM Magazine	4/5 stars
The Christian Beat	4.9/5
Today's Christian Entertainment	4.9/5 stars

The album received positive reviews upon its release. Jesus Freak Hideout's Michael Weaver wrote "I think it's safe to say that Seventh Day Slumber is back. I realize the band never officially left, per se, but the guys have returned to their roots. Found feels much more like the album that the band wanted to make and not what the label most likely dictated. While there a couple perceived weaker moments, they can be excused as a nod to those fans who enjoyed the worship years. There's no doubt that some of those fans may be quite shocked by some of the rocking guitar riffs and solos contained in this album. For an old school fan, however, this album is quite a blast of a listen."

Writing for One Man in the Middle, Robert Allwright gave a positive review, summarizing that "this is an album that signals a return of the older version of Seventh Day Slumber. The electric guitars are allowed to play, the lyrics deal with issues and there is the edge of a softer sound. To try and combine both sounds in one album, and even one song is interesting and, just maybe, this is a new SDS. Free to make the music they want to make, but also to experiment with some different sounds, be more mellowed, but ultimately rockers at heart!"

The publication Jesus Wired also positively reviewed the album. "With this album," they wrote, "it’s safe to say that Seventh Day Slumber has found their form again. This doesn’t mean they returned to the days when they released purely rock albums. It’s pretty obvious from this album that the band has no intention of sweeping their worship days under the rug. Instead, they have learned from that phase of their career and have used that knowledge to create a fully conscious album that culminates all they have been throughout the years."

The Christian Beat concluded, "Without reservations, Found is a powerful collection. It’s Seventh Day Slumber at their best, proclaiming the love of Christ and providing hope in every lyric. Every song is engaging and thoughtful, captivating listeners and leaving them with substance even after the album closes. For audiences in all walks of life, Found is certainly worth the listen."

Kelly Meade of Today's Christian Entertainment said, "From guitar driven rock anthems to heartfelt ballads, Found features Seventh Day Slumber’s powerful vocals and honest lyrics that acknowledge the struggles people deal with every day. The songs on the album provide a path that leads to the grace, forgiveness & mercy of an everlasting God Who loves you more than you can imagine and wants to walk with you through the valleys to the mountain top where you can stand strong in your faith once more."

== Track listing ==
All lyrics are written by Joseph Rojas; all music is composed by Seventh Day Slumber.

No.	Title	Length
1.	"Sky Is Falling"	3:53
2.	"Horizon"	3:31
3.	"Found"	3:32
4.	"Sins of Our Fathers"	3:21
5.	"Heart on My Sleeve"	3:22
6.	"Mercy Meets My Pain"	3:29
7.	"Till The End"	3:23
8.	"Into the Fire"	3:16
9.	"Fallen"	3:09
10.	"My Last Words"	3:33
Total length:		34:29

== Personnel ==
credits adapted from liner notes.

Seventh Day Slumber

- Joseph Rojas - vocals
- Jeremy Holderfield - guitars, programming, production, engineering
- Ken Reed - bass
- Blaise Rojas - drums

Additional Personnel

- Aaron Sprinkle - vocal production
- Andrew Stanton - additional guitars
- Cooper Green - additional guitars
- JR McNeely - mixing
- Brad Blackwood - mastering
- Erich Sandersfield - additional production
- Justin Saunders - strings
- Matt Wiley - organ
- David Joseph - artwork
