= The Anthem of Angels =

Studio album by Seventh Day Slumber
- Released: November 15, 2011
- Genre: Christian rock, CCM
- Label: BEC Recordings
- Producer: Brent Milligan

Seventh Day Slumber chronology
Take Everything (2009)	The Anthem of Angels (2011)	Love & Worship (2013)

Singles from The Anthem of Angels
- 1. "Love Came Down" Released: 2011; 2. "Never Too Far Gone" Released: 2011; 3. "One Mistake" Released: 2011; 4. "Wasted Life" Released: 2012

The Anthem of Angels is the seventh studio album by American Christian rock band Seventh Day Slumber. It was produced by Brent Mulligan and released on November 15th, 2011, debuting at No. 4 on the iTunes Top Christian Albums chart Like 2009's Take Everything, the album consists of covers of songs from other CCM artists, such as John Mark McMillan and Jeremy Riddle, along with originals. It is the band's first album without bassist Joshua Schwartz, with Milligan filling in for the album.

== Composition ==
Many of the original songs on the album were written from personal experiences of vocalist Joseph Rojas. "One Mistake", for example, dealt with the guilt Rojas had after viewing a vulgar image online. "I literally felt sick to my stomach." Rojas said, "Here I am, lead singer of a Christian rock band, a lot of people look up to me. I felt like I had just made a huge mistake. I could have hidden it, but I know you cannot hide from God." the intent in creating the album was to ultimately provide "many songs you can sing along to. You’ll hear catchy melodies and hooks and big riffs. From beginning to end, it’s a full rock worship experience.”.

== Critical reception ==
Professional ratings
Review scores
Source	Rating
Jesus Freak Hideout	2.5/5 stars
Indie Vision Music	2/5 stars
New Release Today	4/5 stars

The album received mixed reviews from critics. Jesus Freak Hideout wrote that "Seventh Day Slumber has a well-deserved reputation for passionate ministry, but careful attention to their sound and taking chances lyrically would not be a subtraction from their calling to hurting youth. Instead, it would most likely broaden their audience and opportunities to impact the masses for Jesus." Indie Vision concluded that "Holistically, The Anthem of Angels is a record that is dichotomous. On one hand, they are able to write some songs (‘One Mistake’, ‘Pieces’) that balance the vocals and music nicely, with some lyrics that aren’t overly cliché; on the other, some songs are very muddled. Regardless, Joseph [Rojas]’s passion is extremely evident in an album that cannot be overlooked if you’re a true fan of these Texans". New Release Today gave a more positive review, arguing that "The genre of worship music can often present a more or less closed door to hard rock artists, but Seventh Day Slumber doesn’t just knock on that door; they knock it down and invite their fanbase in with them. The Anthem of Angels is an album of searching, of honesty, and of worship. The seamless blending of their gritty roots and heartfelt worship lyrics is a feat few bands have accomplished."

== Track listing ==
All music is composed by Seventh Day Slumber.

No.	Title	Lyrics	Length
1.	"Wasted Life"	Joseph Rojas	4:00
2.	"Love Came Down"	Jeremy Edwardson, Jeremy Riddle	4:28
3.	"One Mistake"	Rojas, Brent Milligan	3:53
4.	"Addicted to My Pain"	Rojas, Milligan, Jordan Mohilowski, Lucio Rubino, Preston Pohl	3:26
5.	"Never Too Far Gone"	Rojas, Milligan	2:50
6.	"Pieces"	Rojas	4:13
7.	"Crash"	Rojas, Milligan	3:47
8.	"Back Where I Began"	Rojas, Milligan	4:33
9.	"Knows My Name"	Rojas	4:31
10.	"My Life"	Rojas	3:42
11.	"How He Loves"	John Mark McMillan
Total length:			43:25

== Personnel ==
Credits adapted from liner notes.

Seventh Day Slumber

- Joseph Rojas – vocals, guitar
- Jeremy Holderfield – guitar, backing vocals
- Jamie Davis – drums

Additional Personnel

- Brent Milligan – bass, backing vocals, production
- Lester Estelle – drums
- Dan Needham – drums
- JR McNeely – mixing
- Luke Brown – backing vocals
- Isaac Moreno – engineering
- Lori Rojas – engineering
- Chris Athens – mastering
- Ryan Clark – artwork
