= Fractured Paradise =

Studio album by Seventh Day Slumber
- Released: March 15, 2024
- Genres: Christian metal; melodic metalcore; post-hardcore
- Length: 32:53
- Label: Rockfest
- Producer: Kellen McGregor

Seventh Day Slumber chronology
Death by Admiration (2022)	Fractured Paradise (2024)

Singles from Fractured Paradise
- 1. "Surviving the Wasteland" Released: February 10, 2023; 2. "A Bullet Meant for Me" Released: July 7, 2023; 3. "Feasting on Vultures" Released: September 22, 2023; 4. "My Novocain" Released: February 9, 2024; 5. "Black Roses White Doves" Released: February 28, 2025; 6. "Savior Machine" Released: April 11, 2025; 7. "Garden of Shadows" Released: May 2, 2025; 8. "Left Behind (Kirk Cameron)" Released: May 15, 2025

Fractured Paradise is the fourteenth studio album by American Christian rock group Seventh Day Slumber. It was released on March 15, 2024, and produced by Kellen McGregor. A deluxe edition of the album was released on May 16, 2025. The album features multiple collaborations, including guest slots from Kellin Quinn and Brook Reeves, as well as Paul McCoy. It is their last album to feature Ken Reed on bass before his departure from the band in 2025, with guitarist Weston Evans taking over bass duties.

== Critical reception ==
Professional ratings
Review scores
Source	Rating
Jesus Freak Hideout	4/5 stars
New Release Today	favorable

Jesus Freak Hideout wrote: "Overall, Fractured Paradise is a worthy followup to one of 2022's standout albums [Death by Admiration]. While it may be less likely to convert new fans or truly change the game for the veteran band, current fans of Seventh Day Slumber and the modern rock/metal scene as a whole will likely find more than enough to like here. There are enough signs of maturation and musical evolution even in just two years to show that almost three decades into their career, Seventh Day Slumber still have a ton of gas in their tank."

New Release Today praised the album, stating, "The honesty and seriousness of the lyrics in Fractured Paradise make this album extraordinarily relevant and timely for today's world! Joe Rojas's honesty, integrity, and undeniable street cred are why I believe this one will rise to the top and fast. I love Fractured Paradise, and you will, too."

== Track listing ==
All lyrics are written by Joseph Rojas, Blaise Rojas and Weston Evans, except where noted; all music is composed by Seventh Day Slumber.

No.	Title	Writer(s)	Length
1.	"Yours Truly" (feat. Magdalene Rose)	Joseph Rojas, Blaise Rojas, Magdalene Rose Rojas, Weston Evans	3:35
2.	"Chemical Burn"	Joseph Rojas, Blaise Rojas, Magdalene Rose English Rojas, Weston Evans	3:07
3.	"Surviving the Wasteland"	Joseph Rojas, Blaise Rojas, Weston Evans, Kellen McGregor	3:18
4.	"A Bullet Meant for Me"		3:28
5.	"Blistering Memories"		2:39
6.	"Feasting on Vultures" (featuring Kellin Quinn)		3:15
7.	"Lizards of Malice"		3:30
8.	"My Novocain"		2:53
9.	"Rehearsing Tragedies"		3:26
10.	"Fractured Paradise"		3:42
Total length:			32:53

Deluxe Edition
No.	Title	Writer(s)	Length
11.	"Savior Machine" (featuring Jeremy Dunn & Xander Raymond Charles)	Joseph Rojas, Blaise Rojas, Weston Evans, Xander Raymond Charles	3:40
12.	"Garden of Shadows" (featuring Paul McCoy & Starringo)	Joseph Rojas, Blaise Rojas, Weston Evans, Paul McCoy, DeMorris Marquin Hamburg	3:28
13.	"Black Roses White Doves"		3:29
14.	"Left Behind (Kirk Cameron)" (featuring Brook Reeves)		3:31
15.	"Your Love Is Bliss"		3:58
Total length:			50:59

== Personnel ==
Credits adapted from liner notes.

Seventh Day Slumber

- Joseph Rojas – vocals
- Weston Evans – guitars, additional production, mixing
- Ken Reed – bass
- Blaise Rojas – drums, additional production, additional guitar, vocal production

Additional personnel

- Kellen McGregor – production
- Brad Blackwood – mastering
- Magdalene Rose – guest vocals on "Yours Truly"
- Kellin Quinn – guest vocals on "Feasting on Vultures"
- Jeremy Dunn – guest vocals on "Savior Machine"
- Xander Raymond Charles – guitar on "Savior Machine"
- Paul McCoy – guest vocals on "Garden of Shadows"
- Starringo – guest vocals on "Garden of Shadows"
- Brook Reeves – guest vocals on "Left Behind (Kirk Cameron)"
- Heidi McCartney – choir
- Justin McCartney – choir
- Jake Briggs – choir
- Mary Brigss – choir
