= Death by Admiration =

Studio album by Seventh Day Slumber
- Released: January 28, 2022
- Genres: Christian metal; melodic metalcore; post-hardcore
- Label: Rockfest
- Producer: Kellen McGregor

Seventh Day Slumber chronology
Unseen: The Lion & The Lamb (2021)	Death by Admiration (2022)	Fractured Paradise (2024)

Singles from Death by Admiration
- 1. "What I've Become" Released: May 28, 2021; 2. "Death by Admiration" Released: January 14, 2022; 3. "Halos" Released: January 28, 2022

Death by Admiration is the thirteenth studio album by American Christian rock band Seventh Day Slumber. It was released on January 28, 2022, and was produced by Kellen McGregor. The album marks a significant shift in the band's sound, employing melodic metalcore in place of their longterm alternative rock. It debuted at #69 on the Billboard Top 200 and hit on the top 25 on Billboards Mainstream Rock Chart.

== Composition ==
"Death By Admiration is about a guy in a trophy display case," said vocalist Joseph Rojas in an interview with New Release Today, "surrounded by trophies, who is suffocating in isolation. In a more literal manner, the album's name is about people looking up to a leader who is feeling pressured to be good, well, and perfect."

the title track addresses feeling "bigger than we are because people have put us up on a pedestal" and also feeling "afraid to let anyone down because of their admiration"; "What I've Become" was drawn from Rojas' past alcoholism. "Halos" is about "living with the things that you never got to say to someone", having been based on instances in Rojas and guitarist Weston Evans' lives where friends reached out to them moments before they died and they never got back to them. "Can't Say Sorry Enough" is a tribute to Rojas' wife; "After 22 years of marriage and all that I’ve done, she still wants to be close to me. I know that God heard her prayers: He healed me. Even though I know that she forgives me, I feel like I can’t say sorry enough for what I did."

== Critical reception ==
Professional ratings
Review scores
Source	Rating
Jesus Freak Hideout	4/5 stars 4.5/5 stars
Sputnikmusic	3.5/5 stars
Rock On Purpose	favorable
365 Days of Inspiring Media	2/5 stars

In their positive review of the album, Jesus Freak Hideout wrote: "Death By Admiration is certainly one of the band's strongest endeavors, and may just be their best work yet. The musicianship is top notch, and Rojas' vocals have shown improvement in multiple areas. This growth was initiated by Memphis May Fire's guitarist Kellen McGregor, who produced the record, influencing the band to go in a heavier direction. Those searching for a solid Christian rock album will be delighted with what they find here, as Death By Admiration is well worth the listen."

Sputnikmusic gave a positive review, stating: "Death by Admiration is difficult to find fault with. If it tried to do anything more than what it does, I might judge it on the merits on what it tried, but it doesn't. I get it—that might be enough to steer a few away from this one. But while every movement on this album has been calculated and calibrated, it can't help but hit the 'fun' mark with almost zero spread. Twenty-six years and counting sees SDS hitting a new stride and sounding more energetic, youthful, and full of life than ever. Admirable, indeed."

Rock On Purpose praised the album, saying, "Sonically, this is the most polished Seventh Day Slumber has ever sounded, complete with tight riffs, compelling drums, and dynamic vocals. None of this is surprising, considering Kellen McGregor produced the album. Everything sounds so well thought out and is arranged with precision. Weston Evans’s guitarwork is stellar, and his relentless fretwork has helped push Seventh Day Slumber into new territory. Drummer Blaise Rojas pummels his instrument with dexterity and control while also contributing significantly to the writing. Vocalist Joseph Rojas shines, displaying an impressive range. All the pieces of this album fall together wonderfully, and it is delightful to see this veteran band push the envelope of what’s typically expected of a band with their longevity."

365 Days of Inspiring Media was less positive, arguing that "Maybe musically the album is supposed to be this intense- to have headbangers, songs to rock out to, and songs to get your heart pumping and racing. Perhaps reviewing this album in the middle of the day (and on a rainy day in fact!) isn’t the best way to go, and maybe in time I’ll enjoy these tracks a whole lot more. But right now, as it stands, Seventh Day Slumber’s Death By Admiration is top notch lyrically as always, but I really can’t get past the intense rock music. Apart from the album ender, there’s not really much variety musically."

== Track listing ==
All music is composed by Seventh Day Slumber.

No.	Title	Writer(s)	Length
1.	"Death by Admiration" (featuring Tyler Smith)	Joseph Rojas, Tyler Smith, Blaise Rojas, Weston Evans	2:46
2.	"Fatal Love"	Joseph Rojas, Blaise Rojas, Weston Evans	3:44
3.	"Solemn Oath"	Joseph Rojas, Blaise Rojas, Weston Evans, Miguel Sanchez	3:20
4.	"What I've Become"	Joseph Rojas	3:25
5.	"Halos"	Joseph Rojas, Blaise Rojas, Weston Evans	3:38
6.	"Snake Mouth" (featuring Miguel Sanchez)	Joseph Rojas	3:56
7.	"Light the Way"	Joseph Rojas, Blaise Rojas, Weston Evans, Tyler Smith	2:53
8.	"Landmines"	Joseph Rojas, Blaise Rojas, Weston Evans	3:37
9.	"Some Things Never Change"	Joseph Rojas, Blaise Rojas, Weston Evans	3:19
10.	"Can't Say Sorry Enough"	Joseph Rojas, Josiah Prince	4:28
Total length:			35:06

== Personnel ==
Credits adapted from liner notes.

Seventh Day Slumber

- Joseph Rojas – vocals
- Weston Evans – guitars
- Ken Reed – bass
- Blaise Rojas – drums, backing vocals

Additional personnel

- Kellen McGregor – production, backing vocals, keyboards, programming
- Tyler Smith – guest vocals on track 1
- Miguel Sanchez – guest vocals on track 6
- Brad Blackwood – engineering
