= Closer to Chaos =

Studio album by Seventh Day Slumber
- Released: May 31, 2019
- Genres: Christian rock, hard rock
- Label: Rockfest
- Producers: Jeremy Holderfield, Josiah Prince

Seventh Day Slumber chronology
Found (2017)	Closer to Chaos (2019)	Unseen: The Lion & The Lamb (2021)

Singles from Closer to Chaos
- 1. "Alive Again" Released: 2019; 2. "Still Breathing" Released: 2019; 3. "Man Down" Released: 2019

Closer to Chaos is the eleventh studio album by American Christian rock band Seventh Day Slumber. It was produced by their guitarist Jeremy Holderfield, and was released through the band's self-made Rockfest Records. It is also their last album with Holderfield, as he departed the band in 2020. It debuted in the Top 20 on Nielsen SoundScan's Current Hard Music Albums chart, and also landed in the Top 40 on Nielsen SoundScan's Current Rock Albums chart, whilst debuting at #10 on Billboard's Top Christian Albums chart.

== Composition ==
Talking about the album's themes and writing with The Christian Beat, vocalist Joseph Rojas said "I feel like a lot of us as Christian men and women, we are just getting closer and closer to the edge. And I feel like we are constantly pushing the envelope, and meanwhile, we are living in a world that has gone completely crazy and nuts. And I’m not even just talking about the political climate; I’m also talking about morality. Things that you would have never thought are on TV or said on the radio – and you would have blushed if it was several years ago. So here we are as a world going crazy and it’s just chaotic." The album features multiple songwriting collaborators such as Kellen McGregor (Memphis May Fire) and Josiah Prince (Disciple), about which Holderfield said, "Just working with all of these people that are so good at what they do, that is different than what we do, helps to bring out things in us. That’s the fun part of cowriting – thinking of a chord structure or a lyric – that we wouldn’t have come up with, but we now get to keep it and use it on our album."

== Critical reception ==
Professional ratings
Review scores
Source	Rating
Jesus Freak Hideout	4/5 stars
One Man in the Middle	5/5 stars
Rock On Purpose	favorable
Cross Rhythms	9/10
365 Days of Inspiring Media	2.5/5 stars

The album received mostly positive reviews. Jesus Freak Hideout said, "While Seventh Day Slumber may not produce the most groundbreaking rock in the industry, they have successfully created an album with practically no major flaws. From the tight musicianship to the solid lyricism, to the passionate vocal delivery, there is not much to criticize about the band’s latest release. This is easily some of their best work, which is impressive, considering the fact that they have been around for almost 20 years; it showcases why they deserve a place in the Christian Rock industry."

One Man in the Middle's Robert Allwright raved, "You know that this album really carries the heart of this band. They are not prepared to make this a nice thing for us to sing along to. This is filled with pain and emotion that when you listen to the words behind the guitars, bass and drums and you hear the heartbeat of this album, then you just can't sit in the Christian bubble anymore and ignore the conclusion that we need to be part of the solution to this. Those that identify most will be those that are going through this battle daily, those who have never experienced themselves can count themselves lucky and wake up to the desperate need surrounding them. Thank you guys from 7DS for sounding this message, being unafraid to put this out there and expressing something of the pain that many of us face when we open our eyes in the morning."

Mary Nikkel of Rock On Purpose didn't post an official rating, but positively reviewed the album, concluding, "Occasionally a band puts out a record that feels like somehow the truest version of themselves, like they’ve laser-focused in on all the things they’ve always wanted to sing. Closer to Chaos feels like that for Seventh Day Slumber. Every song is heavy both musically and thematically, taking on raw pain with visceral guitar riffs and vocals. The scale of the heartbreak addressed on Closer to Chaos is massive, but the hope of redemption claimed as truth is even bigger still."

Cross Rhythms writes, "It would be fair to say that [the band does] not push any boundaries, but what they do, they do well! Solid bass rhythms, layers, textures of light and shade are all held together by intricate drum work. The only grating negative that I could find was a slight overuse of an electronic echo effect that became a motif through several of the 10 tracks. 'Closer To Chaos' is definitely an album that sees an experienced group of rock musicianaries at the top of their game."

365 Days of Inspiring Media was less positive, writing that "Maybe musically the album is supposed to have 10 headbangers. 10 songs to rock out to, and 10 songs to get your heart pumping and racing. Perhaps reviewing this album in the middle of the day isn’t the best way to go, and maybe in time I’ll enjoy these tracks a whole lot more. But right now, as it stands, Seventh Day Slumber’s Closer To Chaos is good lyrically, but I really can’t get past the intense rock music."

== Track listing ==
All music is composed by Seventh Day Slumber.

No.	Title	Writer(s)	Length
1.	"Alive Again"	Jeremy Holderfield, Joseph Rojas	3:35
2.	"Cold Kiss Embrace"	Holderfield, Joseph Rojas	3:30
3.	"Burning an Empire"	Holderfield, Joseph Rojas	3:07
4.	"Drama"	Aaron Watkins, Rob McDonough, Patrick Madsen, Josiah Prince	2:56
5.	"Light It Up"	Holderfield, Rojas, Watkins, Madsen, McDonough	2:59
6.	"Man Down"	Blaise Rojas, Joseph Rojas, Prince	4:44
7.	"The Letter"	Blaise Rojas, Marco Pera, Joseph Rojas	3:34
8.	"Still Breathing"	Charles Gabbard, Holderfield, Joseph Rojas	4:11
9.	"Sober"	Holderfield, Joseph Rojas, Blaise Rojas	3:05
10.	"Your Eyes"	Joseph Rojas, Prince	3:36
Total length:			35:17

== Personnel ==
credits adapted from liner notes.

Seventh Day Slumber

- Joseph Rojas - vocals
- Blaise Rojas - drums
- Jeremy Holderfield - guitars, production, programming, engineering
- Ken Reed – bass

Additional Personnel

- Josiah Prince - production
- JR McNeely - mixing
- Brad Blackwood - mastering
