= Redline (EP) =

EP by Seventh Day Slumber
- Released: October 9, 2015
- Genres: Christian rock, hard rock, alternative metal
- Length: 16:51
- Label: VSR
- Producer: Jeremy Holderfield

Seventh Day Slumber chronology
We Are the Broken (2014)	Redline (2015)	Found (2017)

Redline is an extended play from American rock band Seventh Day Slumber. It was released on October 10, 2015, under VSR, and is the debut of vocalist Joseph Rojas' son Blaise on drums.

== Critical reception ==
Professional ratings
Review scores
Source	Rating
365 Days of Inspiring Media	4/5 stars
CCM Magazine	4/5 stars
HM Magazine	3/5 stars
Jesus Freak Hideout	3.5/5 stars
New Release Today	4.5/5 stars

In a four star review at CCM Magazine, Andy Argyrakis responded, "Redline...tips the scales back towards an intentionally aggressive tone." Nick Sabin, signaling in a three star review by HM Magazine, says, "For an EP, it's a venture that proves this is some of the band's best work yet, and if it's a stage-setter for a future full-length, it upholds the band's worth in their arena." Awarding the EP four and a half stars for New Release Today, Jonathan J. Francesco states, "Redline is another of those highlights for the year that will outshine many of the full-length releases for me." Christopher Smith, giving the EP three and a half stars at Jesus Freak Hideout, writes, "With many bands losing the edge they once had, both musically and lyrically, it's exciting to see Seventh Day Slumber regaining their relevance with Redline." Rating the EP four stars from 365 Days of Inspiring Media, Joshua Andre says, "Redline serves as a welcome and enjoyable alternative, for listeners who want more musical variety and edgier rock tunes."

== Track list ==
All music is composed by Seventh Day Slumber.

Track list
No.	Title	Writer(s)	Length
1.	"Bring It On"	Joseph Rojas, Jeremy Holderfield, Josiah Prince	2:40
2.	"Gone"	Holderfield, Rojas	3:20
3.	"Hunger Strike (Temple of the Dog cover" (featuring Kevin Young of Disciple)	Chris Cornell	3:51
4.	"I'll Bleed"	Holderfield, Rojas	3:27
5.	"Lost in the Lights"	Holderfield, Rojas	3:33
Total length:			16:51

== Personnel ==
credits adapted from liner notes.

Seventh Day Slumber

- Joseph Rojas - vocals
- Ken Reed – bass
- Blaise Rojas - drums
- Jeremy Holderfield – guitar, piano, backing vocals, programming, production, engineering,

Additional personnel

- Brent Milligan - additional bass
- Brandon Bagby – additional guitars
- Josiah Prince – backing vocals
- Kevin Young – guest vocals on "Hunger Strike"
- JR McNeely – mixing
- Brad Blackwood – mastering
- Isaac Moreno – technical advisor
- Jared Lankford – programming
- Lester Estelle – programming
- Robert Venable – engineering
