= Stephen Speaks =

American acoustic rock/indie pop band

- Also known as: Rockwell Ryan
- Origin: Oklahoma, U.S.
- Genres: Indie pop, pop rock, acoustic rock, post-grunge
- Years active: 1999–present
- Labels: Rippley Records, Inc.
- Members: Rockwell Ryan Ripperger
- Past members: TJ McCloud
- Website: stephenspeaks.com

Stephen Speaks is an American acoustic rock/indie pop band project of singer-songwriter Rockwell Ryan Ripperger. The band was initially founded by Ripperger and TJ McCloud in 1999 as a duo.

Stephen Speaks released its first full-length album No More Doubt independently in September 2001. The album did well, spreading through college campuses and the newly formed Internet sharing service, Napster. Through word of mouth, the singles "Out of My League" and "Passenger Seat" were picked up internationally and both songs gained significant airplay on Filipino radio stations in early 2003, breaking all previous pop music records for that country. No More Doubt was then picked up for distribution by Warner Music Philippines and went platinum within ten days of its release in that country.

In January 2018, the single "Walk On", from Stephen Speaks' fourth scheduled studio album Alive to Fight, was released.

== History ==
Stephen Speaks' first studio album, No More Doubt, was recorded in 2000. Upon release in 2001, "Passenger Seat" and "Out of My League" received significant airplay atop Filipino pop radio stations. No More Doubt was released in the Philippines on February 4, 2003, through Warner Music and Rippley Records, and declared platinum ten days later on February 14, 2003.

Stephen Speaks' second album was recorded in Ripperger's home studio in 2003. "The Leaving Song" featured Ryan Tedder on vocals. Ripperger briefly performed under his real name Rockwell Ryan before reverting to Stephen Speaks in 2004 after McCloud departed to focus on his solo career. Ripperger usually performs along with his brother Dain Samuelson who plays percussion for him. In 2005, Ripperger digitally produced One More Day for exclusive release on iTunes. Ripperger worked with producer Chad Copelin to release Symptoms of Love on January 7, 2008.

In December 2010, Stephen Speaks released Christmas with Friends 2 for free on the band's website. The album featured vocalists Lindsey Sandella, Ben Kilgore, Noelle Kilgore, Julia Frej, and Jay Lashley, and guitarists Jesse Aycock, Jeff Coleman, Matt Cox, and Ben Mosier.

Stephen Speaks' third studio album, Age of the Underdog, was recorded in the summer of 2010 with producer and drummer Brady Blade. The album was released in 2011 alongside a documentary of the recordings.

== Members ==
Former member

- TJ McCloud (vocals, guitar)

=== Touring/session members ===
Current

- Dain Samuelson (percussion)

Former

- Amber Sturges (vocals)
- Blake Howard (bass guitar)
- Blake Farmer (drums)

== Discography ==
=== Studio albums ===
- No More Doubt (2000)
- Symptoms of Love (2008)
- Age of the Underdog (2011)
- Alive to Fight (2018)

=== Extended plays ===
- Doubting Thomas (1999)
- No More Doubt (2000)
- One More Day (2003)

=== Compilations ===
- Christmas with Friends (2009)
- Christmas with Friends 2 (2010)
- Christmas with Friends 3 (2011)
