= Jacob E. Smart =

United States Air Force general (1909–2006)

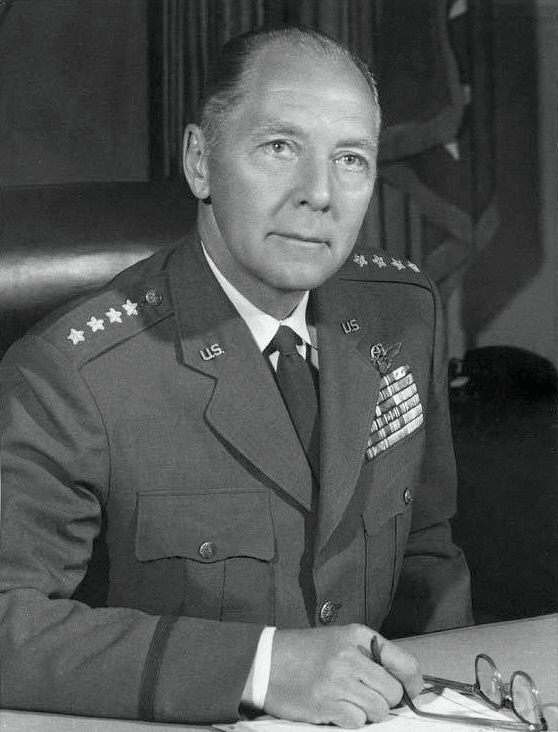
- General Jacob E. Smart
- Born: May 31, 1909; Ridgeland, South Carolina, United States
- Died: November 12, 2006 (aged 97); Ridgeland, South Carolina, United States
- Military career
- Allegiance: United States of America
- Branch: United States Army; United States Air Force
- Service years: 1931–1947 (Army); 1947–1966 (Air Force)
- Rank: General
- Commands: Pacific Air Forces; U.S. Forces in Japan; Twelfth Air Force
- Conflicts: World War II; Korean War
- Awards: Distinguished Service Cross; Army Distinguished Service Medal (3); Air Force Distinguished Service Medal; Distinguished Flying Cross; Legion of Merit; Air Medal (4); Purple Heart (2)

Jacob Edward Smart (May 31, 1909 – November 12, 2006) was a general officer who served in United States Army during World War II and in the Air Force during the Cold War era.

== Early life ==
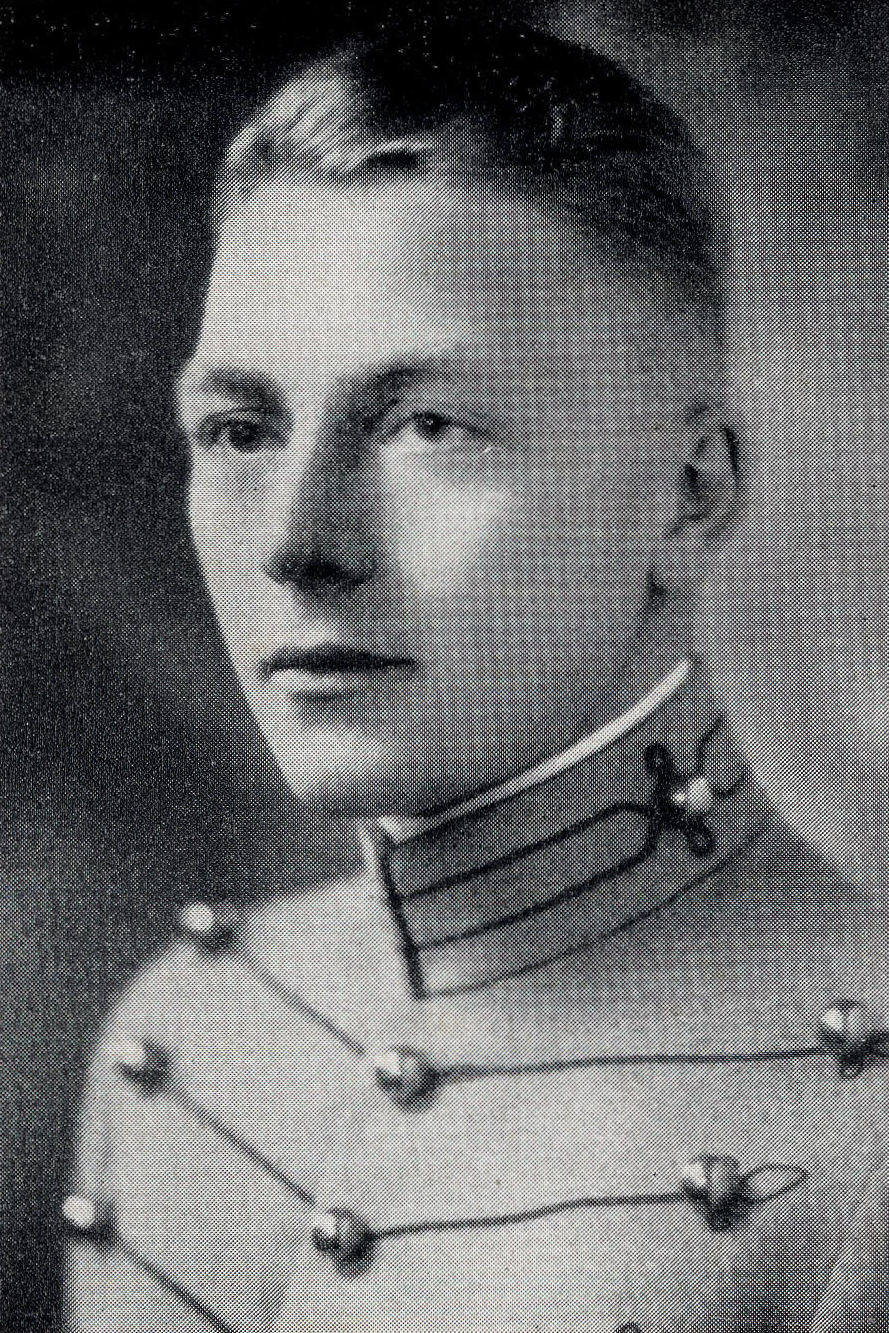
Smart as a United States Military Academy cadet c. 1931

Smart was born in Ridgeland, South Carolina, the son of a railroad conductor, and was educated in the public schools of South Carolina and Georgia, and at Marion Military Institute in Marion, Alabama.

== Military career ==
Smart graduated from the United States Military Academy in 1931 as an Army flying officer and entered flight training with the Army Air Corps. He later became a flying instructor. When the United States entered World War II, Smart, a colonel at that time, was chief of staff for flight training at the Army Air Force headquarters in Washington, D.C..

=== World War II ===
Smart joined the Air Corps Advisory Council in July 1942, serving on the staff of General "Hap" Arnold, the chief of staff of the Army Air Force. In this position, he was involved with the planning of the invasion of Europe and participated in the meeting between U.S. President Franklin D. Roosevelt and British Prime Minister Winston Churchill in Casablanca, Morocco in 1943. He received the Legion of Merit for his services.

Smart was assigned to 9th Bomber Command in the Middle East in 1943. He was the architect of Operation Tidal Wave, in which 178 B-24 Liberator heavy bombers from five bombardment groups of the 9th Army Air Force flew a 2,400-mile round trip from bases near Benghazi in Libya to perform a low-level bombing raid on the oil refineries at Ploieşti, Romania, on 1 August 1943. Nearly 40% of the oil plant was destroyed, but 55 of the American planes were lost and another 50 severely damaged. He received the Distinguished Service Medal; five other airmen received the Medal of Honor, the most for any single military action. Despite its success, the plant was repaired and back to its original operating capacity within a month.

Smart attended the Army-Navy Staff College, graduating in February 1944. He then joined the 15th Air Force in the Mediterranean Theater, commanding the 97th Bomb Group in Italy. Despite his knowledge of top secret issues, such as plans for the Normandy invasion, he was allowed to fly missions over enemy territory.

On his 29th mission, May 10, 1944, Smart was flying a B-17 Flying Fortress on a mission to bomb aircraft factories near Wiener Neustadt, Austria. The aircraft was hit by anti-aircraft fire and exploded. He was thrown from the wreck in mid-air but managed to open his parachute despite the wounds he had received from the explosion. He landed and was immediately captured by the Germans and held as a prisoner of war until freed by the forces of General George S. Patton's Army on April 29, 1945. His captors knew he was important and did their best to extract secrets from him but Smart was able to evade all their questions.

Upon his repatriation to the US, Smart returned to duty as a top aide to General Arnold, continuing as the U.S. Air Force was formed in 1947. He graduated from the National War College in June 1950, and commanded 32nd Air Division at Stewart Air Force Base in New York, and was later vice commander of Eastern Air Defense Force.

=== Postwar career ===
During the Korean War, Smart served as deputy for operations in the Far East Air Force where he showed his skill as a strategist. He also flew several sorties, and was injured. He returned to Washington, D.C., in June 1955, as assistant vice chief of staff at U.S. Air Force Headquarters, and became commander of the Twelfth Air Force, Tactical Air Command, in September 1959. He became vice commander of Tactical Air Command in January 1960, based at Langley Air Force Base. He served as Commander U.S. Forces in Japan from August 1961; and then as Commander of the Pacific Air Forces in Honolulu from August 1963. He became Deputy Commander of the U.S. European Command in July 1964, and retired in July 1966.

== Later life ==
Following his retirement, Smart served as an administrator with NASA for several years. He eventually returned to live in Ridgeland.

Smart died in his sleep from congestive heart failure at the age of 97 on Sunday, November 12, 2006, and was buried the following week on Thursday November 16, 2006. He was divorced in 1946. He had four children; three daughters and a son. He was predeceased by two daughters.

== Awards and decorations ==
Smart received numerous decorations including: Distinguished Service Cross, Distinguished Service Medal, Distinguished Flying Cross, Legion of Merit and four awards of the Air Medal. He was also awarded the decoration of Ulchi by the Republic of Korea, and was an honorary Knight Commander of the Order of the British Empire.

USAF Command Pilot
Distinguished Service Cross	Air Force Distinguished Service Medal	Army Distinguished Service Medal with two bronze oak leaf clusters
Legion of Merit	Distinguished Flying Cross	Purple Heart with bronze oak leaf cluster
Air Medal with three bronze oak leaf clusters	Army Commendation Medal	Prisoner of War Medal
American Defense Service Medal	American Campaign Medal	Asiatic-Pacific Campaign Medal with two bronze campaign stars
European–African–Middle Eastern Campaign Medal with silver and bronze campaign stars	World War II Victory Medal	National Defense Service Medal with service star
Korean Service Medal with bronze campaign star	Air Force Longevity Service Award with one silver and two bronze oak leaf clusters	Honorary Knight Commander of the Order of the British Empire (United Kingdom)
Order of Military Merit; Eulji Medal (South Korea)	United Nations Korea Medal	Republic of Korea War Service Medal

=== Distinguished Service Cross ===

Smart, Jacob E.
Colonel, U.S Army Air Forces
97th Bombardment Group, 15th Air Force
Date of Action: 18 March 1944 to 10 May 1944
Headquarters, U.S. Army Air Forces-Mediterranean Theater of Operations, General Orders No. 32 (June 12, 1944)

Citation:

The President of the United States of America, authorized by Act of Congress, July 9, 1918, takes pleasure in presenting the Distinguished Service Cross to Colonel (Air Corps) Jacob Edward Smart, United States Army Air Forces, for extraordinary heroism in connection with military operations against an armed enemy while serving as Commanding Officer of the 97th Bombardment Group (H), Fifteenth Air Force, while participating in a bombing mission on 10 May 1944, against a vitally important and heavily defended aircraft production center in Wiener-Neustadt, Austria. Colonel Smart remained with a ship damaged by a direct hit until he was assured that his group would accurately bomb the target. Leaving the protective formation to return the crippled ship to its base, Colonel Smart displayed great courage in remaining with the ship when its condition would have warranted abandonment. Colonel Smart's courage, resourcefulness and determination led to his selection to lead an attack on another vital target in the same area on 10 May 1944. With the skill and courage that he had displayed on twenty-seven raids during the period of 18 March 1944 to 10 May 1944, Colonel Smart again was successful in bringing his group through unusually severe weather conditions and augmented aircraft defense to the beginning of the bomb run when his ship was observed to explode. The gallant, intrepid leadership displayed by Colonel Smart in accomplishing his assignment regardless of hazard or opposition upholds the highest traditions of the military service and reflect great credit upon himself, the 15th Air Force, and the United States Army Air Forces.
