= Love & Worship =

Studio album by Seventh Day Slumber
- Released: March 12, 2013
- Genre: Christian rock, CCM
- Label: BEC Recordings
- Producer: Brent Milligan

Seventh Day Slumber chronology
The Anthem of Angels (2009)	Love & Worship (2013)	We Are the Broken (2014)

Love & Worship is the eighth studio album by American Christian rock band Seventh Day Slumber. It was released on March 12, 2013, and is their first full worship album.

== Composition ==
"We love playing worship songs live and the atmosphere of worship at our concerts." said guitarist Jeremy Holderfield in an interview with Rockin God's House, "It’s just something we love to do. When we were picking songs for Love & Worship, I felt like God gave us a great list. The song selection happened very quickly. Eight of the songs we put on the album were on the first list we compiled. They all have seriously powerful lyrics."

== Critical reception ==
Professional ratings
Review scores
Source	Rating
Jesus Freak Hideout	3.5/5 stars
Indie Vision Music	2/5 stars
New Release Today	4/5 stars
Breathe Cast	favorable

The album received generally positive reviews. Jesus Freak Hideout said that "Unfortunately, Love & Worship offers up a sound that is mellower than the band's rock oriented material; the hard rock guitars seem turned down a notch and lead singer Joseph Rojas' soulful vocals come across as more subdued than normal. '10,000 Reasons (Bless The Lord)' and Chris Tomlin's 'Our God' both hew a little to close to the original versions and deliveries, and could have used a little 'roughing up', so to speak. But in the final ledger balancing, Love & Worship delivers a worshipful batch of mostly well-chosen and performed songs that put this album in the black." Indie Vision gave a more negative review, summarizing that "While you can’t deny Joseph [Rojas]’s strong sense of passion and enthusiasm (or even an attempt to translate that feeling towards the listeners), I can’t help but sometimes cringe, or even worst case scenario switch off mentally or even fall asleep as I listen to Love and Worship. With so much potential as a band, I feel like this is not the best representation of Seventh Day Slumber, and even if the album was all covers, the production on them needs to be better for me to say that these versions are equally as good as the originals (which they’re not!)." Breathe Cast did not post a rating for the album but nonetheless praised it, stating, "Within the canon of Seventh Day Slumber, Love and Worship is an important record. Not only do the lyrics point directly to God, but it's a gateway for those generally not into hard edged rock to enjoy Seventh Day Slumber. Here we get to worship with them on familiar tunes creatively re-imagined!"

== Track listing ==
All music is composed by Seventh Day Slumber.

No.	Title	Lyrics	Length
1.	"Our God"	Jonas Myrin, Matt Redman, Jesse Reeves, Chris Tomlin	4:18
2.	"I Am Not the Same"	Redman, Pat Barrett, Aaron Keyes, Ben Smith	4:08
3.	"10,000 Reasons (Bless the Lord)"	Redman, Myrin	3:39
4.	"Desert Song"	Brooke Ligertwood	3:43
5.	"Stronger"	Ben Fielding, Reuben Morgan	3:53
6.	"God Is Able"	Fielding, Morgan	3:49
7.	"Forever Reign"	Morgan, Jason Ingram	4:36
8.	"Here With You"	Joseph Rojas, Brent Milligan, Jeremy Holderfield	3:57
9.	"White Flag"	Ingram, Redman, Tomlin	4:19
10.	"Your Name High"	Joel Houston	3:29
11.	"Never Let Go"	Redman, Beth Redman	4:39
Total length:			44:30

== Personnel ==
credits adapted from liner notes.

Seventh Day Slumber

- Joseph Rojas – vocals
- Jeremy Holderfield – guitar, backing vocals, acoustic guitar
- Jamie Davis – drums
- Ken Reed – bass

Additional personnel

- Brent Milligan – bass, backing vocals, production, cello, guitar, acoustic guitar
- Sean Moffitt – mixing
- Warren David – assistant mixing
- Dave McNair – mastering
- Lester Estelle – drums
- Conor Farley – A&R
- Ryan Clark – art direction and design
- Joe Causey – editing
- Harley Stonebridge – Hammond B3, keyboards, synthesizer
- Robert Venable – engineering
