= We Are the Broken =

Studio album by Seventh Day Slumber
- Released: May 13, 2014
- Recorded: 2013
- Venue: Brent Mulligan Studios
- Studio: Off The Wall Studios
- Genre: Christian rock, alternative metal
- Length: 31:13
- Label: VSR
- Producer: Jeremy Holderfield, Brent Milligan

Seventh Day Slumber chronology
Love & Worship (2013)	We Are the Broken (2014)	Redline (2015)

We Are the Broken is the ninth studio album from American Christian rock band Seventh Day Slumber. The album released on May 13, 2014 by VSR Music Group. The album was produced by Jeremy Holderfield and Brent Milligan. The album debut at No. 24 on the Billboard Christian Albums chart.

== Background ==
The album was composed to bolster songs "with no limitations or expectations," said Jeremy Holderfield. "Whatever riff came to mind, and whatever lyric God put on our hearts, we recorded it. To put it simply, it's a completely honest album that takes us back to where we started." For the album, the band signed to VSR.

== Critical reception ==
Professional ratings
Review scores
Source	Rating
365 Days of Inspiring Media	3.5/5 stars
CCM Magazine	3/5 stars
Christian Music Review	4/5 stars
CM Addict	4.5/5 stars
Cross Rhythms	9/10 squares
Jesus Freak Hideout	3.5/5 stars 3/5 stars
Jesus Wired	9.5/10 stars
New Release Tuesday	4/5 stars

We Are the Broken was met with positive reception from critics. Bert Saraco of CCM Magazine rated the album three stars out of five, commenting how the band on the release are "Rocking with a definite sense of purpose" that contains "Plenty of sound, a little thin on artistry, but an album with a healing message and head-banging rhythms." At New Release Tuesday, Jonathan Francesco rated the album four stars out of five, stating that the release "is a solid return to form that offers a number of potential hits." April Covington of Christian Music Review rated the album four stars out of five, writing that "Seventh Day Slumber rocks out while sharing Christ’s love and saving power on We Are the Broken."

In a nine squares review by Cross Rhythms, Paul S. Ganney describing the project as "One of the best CDs I've reviewed for a while; I just stuck it back on again when it finished." At Jesus Freak Hideout, Michael Weaver rated the album three-and-a-half stars out of five, saying that he "wouldn't say 7DS has reached new heights, but We Are the Broken is a solid step in the right direction." Jesus Freak Hideout's Matthew Morris rated the album three stars out of five, noting how "A little more lyrical and musical variety could have made this a more triumphant return to rock for 7DS."

Julia Kitzing of CM Addict rated the album four-and-a-half stars out of five, remarking that "The words of each of the songs share a powerful message that reaches out to all different ages." At 365 Days of Inspiring Media, Joshua Andre rated the album three-and-a-half stars out of five, indicating how the release "serves as a welcome and enjoyable alternative, for listeners who want more musical variety and edgier rock tunes." In a nine and a half stars review from Jesus Wired, Iain Moss commenting, "With We Are The Broken Seventh Day Slumber are not only back to their best, they may have even elevated their 'best' to new heights."

== Commercial performance ==
For the Billboard charting week of May 31, 2014, We Are the Broken was the No. 24 most sold album in the Christian Albums market, and it was the No. 14 most sold album on the breaking-and-entry chart of the Heatseekers Albums.

== Track listing ==
Tracklist
No.	Title	Writer(s)	Length
1.	"Goodbye"	Jeremy Holderfield, Justin Rojas, Ryan Vanderburg	3:21
2.	"All She Wants"	Holderfield, Rojas	3:14
3.	"We Are the Broken"	Josh Baker, Michael Barnes, Holderfield, William Hunter, Rojas	4:00
4.	"Nothing To Lose"	Chris Clonts, Holderfield	3:22
5.	"In Too Deep"	Holderfield, Rojas	3:15
6.	"Trust In Me"	Holderfield, Rojas	3:18
7.	"Comatose State"	Holderfield, Rojas	3:09
8.	"Holding On"	Clonts, Holderfield, Rojas	3:33
9.	"Skyscraper" (Demi Lovato cover)	Toby Gad, Kerli Koiv, Lindy Robbins	4:01
Total length:			31:13

== Personnel ==
Credits adapted from liner notes.

Seventh Day Slumber

- Joseph Rojas – vocals
- Jeremy Holderfield – guitar, production, engineering
- Ken Reed – bass, backing vocals

Additional Personnel

- Lester Estelle – drums
- Brent Milligan – production, engineering, additional guitars, backing vocals
- JR McNeely – mixing
- Brad Blackwood – mastering

== Chart performance ==
Chart (2014)	Peak position
US Top Christian Albums (Billboard)	24
US Heatseekers Albums (Billboard)	14
