= Finally Awake =

Studio album by Seventh Day Slumber
- Released: March 20, 2007
- Studio: 747 Studios (Memphis, Tennessee)
- Genre: Christian rock, Christian hard rock
- Length: 42:20
- Label: Tooth & Nail
- Producer: Paul Ebersold

Seventh Day Slumber chronology
Once upon a Shattered Life (2005)	Finally Awake (2007)	Rescátame (2008)

Professional ratings
Review scores
Source	Rating
Jesus Freak Hideout	3.5/5 stars
Cross Rhythms	9/10

Finally Awake is the fifth studio album released by American Christian rock band Seventh Day Slumber. It was released on March 20, 2007 under Tooth & Nail Records. Finally Awake reached its peak on the Top Christian Albums chart at No. 16 in 2007.

== Meaning ==
When Joseph Rojas was asked about the meaning behind Finally Awake, he responded: "The message of this album is clear. We want to empower kids to stop looking to the media, to what the world tells them they have to be, to find identity. You don’t have to be what everyone else tells you to. Be what you were created to be."

== Track listing ==
All lyrics are written by Joseph Rojas and Chuck Shea, except where noted.; all music is composed by Seventh Day Slumber.

No.	Title	Writer(s)	Length
1.	"Awake"	Joseph Rojas, Jeremy Holderfield	3:42
2.	"Last Regret"	Rojas, Holderfield	3:08
3.	"Missing Pages"		3:53
4.	"My Only Hope"		3:45
5.	"Always"	Rojas	4:40
6.	"Breaking Away"		3:35
7.	"Burning Bridges"		3:54
8.	"Undone"		3:26
9.	"On My Way Home"	Rojas, Joshua Schwartz	3:43
10.	"Broken Buildings"		4:21
11.	"Every Saturday"		4:20
Total length:			42:27

== Personnel ==
Credits adapted from liner notes.

Seventh Day Slumber

- Joseph Rojas – lead vocals, rhythm guitars
- Jeremy Holderfield – acoustic piano, guitars, mandolin, backing vocals
- Joshua Schwartz – bass guitar
- Ray Fryoux – drums

Additional musicians

- Paul Ebersold – acoustic piano
- Chuck Shea – guitars, mandolin

=== Production ===
- Brandon Ebel – executive producer
- Paul Ebersold – producer, engineer
- Scott Hardin – engineer
- Skidd Mills – mixing
- Brad Blackwood – mastering at Euphonic Masters (Memphis, Tennessee)
- Jeff Carver – A&R
- Josh Jeter – A&R
- Invisible Creatures – art direction, design
- Allen Clark – band photography
- Jared Knudson – album photography
- Carol Peters – management
