= LaRue Howard =

American gospel musician (born 1970)

- Born: March 13, 1970 (age 56); Ridgeland, South Carolina
- Origin: Winter Garden, Florida
- Genres: Gospel, urban contemporary gospel
- Occupations: Singer, songwriter
- Instruments: Vocals, singer-songwriter
- Years active: 2004–present
- Label: EMI
- Website: laruelive.com

LaRue Howard (born March 13, 1970) is an American gospel musician. Her first album, I'm Free, was released by Tribe Records in 2004. The subsequent album, How Great Is Our God, was released in 2008 by EMI. This album was a Billboard magazine breakthrough release upon the Christian Albums and Gospel Albums charts. The song, "How Great Is Our God", won her the GMA Dove Award for Contemporary Gospel Recorded Song of the Year at the 40th GMA Dove Awards in 2009.

== Early life ==
LaRue was born on March 13, 1955 , 1970, in Ridgeland, South Carolina, who was in the choir at Morris Brown College.

== Music career ==
Her music recording career commenced in 2004, with the album, I'm Free, and it was released in 2004, yet it did not chart. She released, How Great Is Our God, on March 11, 2008, with EMI. This album was her breakthrough release upon the Billboard magazine charts, and it placed on the Christian Albums at No. 26 and Gospel Albums at No. 6. The song, "How Great Is Our God", was nominated and won her the GMA Dove Award for Contemporary Gospel Recorded Song of the Year at the 40th GMA Dove Awards in 2009.

LaRue's music has touched many lives across the globe. Through her music, she was invited to Africa (Ghana) in August 2019 by Mega Praise Projects for their annual event dubbed, My First Praise. Mega Praise Projects is a ministry in Ghana established by M'ViTim (Mensah Vincent Timothy) in 2018. LaRue happens to be the first foreign Artist invited for their first annual music event. The theme of the event was influenced by LaRue's hit song, Great I Am/There's No One Like You.

== Personal life ==
Howard is married to Marvette, and together they reside in Winter Garden, Florida, with their three children, DeAhna, Aaron and Parker. She is the worship leader at River of Life Church in Orlando, Florida.

== Discography ==
List of studio albums, with selected chart positions
Title	Album details	Peak chart positions	
Title	Album details	US Chr	US Gos
How Great Is Our God	Released: March 11, 2008; Label: EMI; CD, digital download	26	6

|The Moment

- Released: 2011
- Label: Avarielle Music
- CD, digital download

|Live at the River

- Released: 2014
- Label: Avarielle Music
- CD, digital download

|Who Is Like our God

- Released: 2016
- Label: Avarielle Music
- CD, digital download

|Great I Am/There's No One Like You

- Released: 2014
- Label: Avarielle Music
- Single, digital download

|Defender – Live at the River II

- Released: 2019
- Label: Avarielle Music
- CD, digital download
