= Angélla Christie =

- Born: February 19, 1963 (age 62); Los Angeles, California, United States
- Genres: Gospel
- Occupation: Musician
- Instrument: Saxophone
- Years active: 1985-present
- Website: www.angellachristie.com

Angélla Christie (born February 19, 1963) in Los Angeles, California, is an American gospel saxophonist. She presently resides in Atlanta, Georgia and has made that her residence since 1987.

Christie has released eight albums and did a 40-city national tour in 2000. Her 1998 album, Hymn & I, reached the 24th spot on the Billboard Top Gospel Albums. Her 2008 album, The Breath of Life, reached the 9th spot on the Billboard Top Contemporary Jazz and 31st spot on the Billboard Top Gospel Albums.

== Discography ==
- 1985: Because He Lives
- 1986: Rejoice
- 1987: It Is Well
- 1996: Eternity
- 1998: Hymn & i
- 2003: Draw The Line
- 2008: The Breath Of Life
- 2017: Intimate Conversations

== Tours ==
- 2000: Sister's In The Spirit 2000
