= Runaway Train (Crabb Revival album) =

Studio album by Crabb Revival
- Released: May 30, 2008
- Genre: Country; CCM
- Label: Daywind Records

Crabb Revival chronology
Runaway Train (2008)	Live at Oak Tree (2009)

Professional ratings
Review scores
Source	Rating
AllMusic	(?)

Runaway Train is the debut album from the Christian country group Crabb Revival. The album was released on May 30, 2008.

== Track listing ==
All songs written by Adam Crabb, except where noted.

1. "Runaway Train" (Crabb, Smith) - 5:15
2. "The Journey" - 4:56
3. "Rescue Me" - 3:18
4. "The Power of One" (Hengber, Post, Still) - 3:40
5. "Best Friends" (Crabb, Scweinsberg, Smith) - 2:58
6. "Both Sides of the River" - 3:12
7. "Smilin' Down on Me" - 3:00
8. "You Amaze Me" - 3:52
9. "Carry On" (Smith) - 3:15
10. "Only a Man" (Lang) - 4:02
11. "Ornament of Grace" (Crabb, Crabb) - 3:13
12. [Untitled] - 1:53

== Awards ==
Runaway Train was nominated for a Dove Award for Country Album of the Year at the 40th GMA Dove Awards.
