= Jadon Lavik =

American singer-songwriter

- Birth name: Jadon Laird Lavik
- Born: May 23, 1978 (age 47); Redmond, Washington, U.S.
- Origin: Redmond, Washington
- Genres: Contemporary worship music, Christian pop, Christian rock
- Years active: 2003–present
- Labels: BEC
- Website: http://www.jadonlavik.com/

Jadon Laird Lavik (born May 23, 1978) is an American contemporary Christian music singer-songwriter, formerly signed with BEC Recordings.

== Background ==
Born in Redmond, Washington, Lavik's parents are Philip and Christine. He has an older brother, Justin, and a younger sister, Anna.

Lavik was on the If I Had One Chance to Tell You Something Tour with Rebecca St. James and BarlowGirl in early 2006 to promote his album, Life on the Inside.

== Discography ==
=== Albums ===
| Year | Title | Record label |
|---|---|---|
| 2004 | Moving on Faith | BEC Recordings |
| 2006 | Life on the Inside | BEC Recordings |
| 2008 | Roots Run Deep | BEC Recordings |
| 2009 | The Road Acoustic | BEC Recordings |
| 2010 | Art and Soul | Independent |
| 2011 | Christmas | BEC Recordings |
| 2012 | Roots Run Deep(er) | Independent |
| 2015 | Summer Sessions EP | Independent |
| 2019 | Christmas | Independent |

=== Compilation appearances ===
- 2004: "Redeeming King" on Empty Me

== Critical response ==
Life on the Inside received positive reviews from Jesus Freak Hideout and Christianity Today.

== Personal life ==
Lavik is married and lives in San Clemente, California.
