= Live at Oak Tree (Aaron & Amanda Crabb album) =

Live album by Aaron & Amanda Crabb
- Released: March 31, 2009
- Genre: Country; CCM
- Label: Daywind Records

Live at Oak Tree is a live album from the Christian country duo Aaron & Amanda Crabb, and part of the Live at Oak Tree series from Daywind Records. The album features a behind-the-scenes look at the presentation of the duo to record live at the Oak Tree studio in Tennessee. It was released in 2009.

== Track listing ==
1. "Please Come Down To Me"
2. "After the Rain"
3. "Miracle"
4. "No One Else Like You"
5. "Thou Art Worthy"
6. "The Name of Jesus"
7. "Amazed"
8. "Less Of Me"
9. "As The Deer"
10. "You Are So Beautiful"
11. "Give It All To Him"

== Awards ==
The album was nominated to a Dove Award for Inspirational Album of the Year at the 41st GMA Dove Awards.
