= TJ McCloud =

American singer-songwriter (born 1980)

- Born: August 26, 1980 (age 44)
- Origin: Oklahoma
- Genres: Indie, CCM
- Occupation(s): Singer, songwriter
- Years active: 1999–present
- Labels: Martingale Music, There And Back Again Music
- Website: TJMcCloud.com

TJ McCloud (born August 26, 1980) is an American indie and folk singer-songwriter and missionary.

== Early career ==
Born in Stillwater, Oklahoma, in 1980, he lived in Perry, Oklahoma until 1990, then moved with his family to Tulsa, Oklahoma, where he finished high school. In 1999, he co-founded the group Doubting Thomas with Jenks High School buddies Ab Colby and Rockwell Ryan Ripperger. While a student at Abilene Christian University in Abilene, Texas, McCloud and Ripperger later morphed into the successful indie group Stephen Speaks. The band's first full-length album No More Doubt, released in September 2001, did well, spreading through college campuses and the newly formed Internet sharing service, Napster. Through word of mouth, the singles "Out of My League" and "Passenger Seat" were picked up internationally and both songs went to No. 1 on Filipino radio stations throughout the Spring of 2003, breaking all previous pop music records for that country. The album, then signed and distributed through Warner Bros., went certified platinum for that market. A music video for "Passenger Seat" was also produced and went to No. 1 on MTV Asia. For the Filipino tour, the McCloud/Ripperger duo was expanded to include Ripperger's brother Dain Samuelson (percussion), Amber Sturges (vocals), Blake Howard (bass), and Blake Farmer (drums). After the surprise radio and music video success in Manila, Philippines, Ripperger and McCloud disbanded Stephen Speaks, and McCloud relocated to Nashville, TN to pursue a solo career as an indie singer and songwriter. Ripperger (who then became known as Rockwell Ryan) began performing once again under the Stephen Speaks name in 2004, releasing several albums to date.

== Solo work ==
McCloud released a limited edition of untitled acoustic demos in 2002, one of which ("Miles Between Us" (aka The Airplane Song)) was featured in 2004's indie film Decoys which aired internationally on the SciFi channel. McCloud's first solo album Kind of Life was produced in 2004 by Nashville indie producer Donnie Boutwell. TJ's solo debut, Kind of Life was released in 2004. His latest release was 2008's Long Live Love-EP, a collection of love songs that includes a version of the popular indie hit "Out of My League" in its original arrangement, which has been used in several highly viewed user-made romantic mash-up videos on YouTube – most notably with Jim and Pam from NBC's The Office.

== Children's music ==
In 2006 McCloud wrote and sang an album of children's music called All God's Animals, in association with Eric Wyse and Brandon Scott Thomas (the ZOE group), which he has described as "kids' songs that moms won't hate". It was re-released in 2009, and due to its success, was nominated by the GMA for a Dove Award in the category of "Best Children's Collection". A follow-up collection was released, called "Sailing in the Ocean (in the belly of a fish)". In 2008, a Christmas collection was released, called What I Love About Christmas.

== Worship music ==
In 2009, McCloud co-wrote the modern worship song, "Rooftops", with Steven Patterson of the worship band Branch. The song was included on the 2009 album Nothing to Lose-Live EP.

== Mission work and Ministry ==
In 2006, TJ and his wife, Holly, moved to the Dominican Republic to start a Christian youth outreach center in the town of Rio San Juan. They worked there with Manna Global Ministries until September 2008, when they moved back to Nashville to continue writing music and working in ministry. He is currently serving as the Director of Missions at Lipscomb University.

== Discography ==
- Doubting Thomas – 1999
- No More Doubt (w/ Stephen Speaks) – 2001
- Kind of Life – 2003
- Playground – A Place I Know – 2006
- Playground – I Want to Shine – 2007
- All God's Animals – 2008 (reissue of 2006 Playground collection)
- Long Live Love – EP – 2008
- Sailing in the Ocean – 2008 (reissue of 2007 Playground collection)
- What I Love About Christmas – (2008)
- The Perfect Crime – EP (2012)
