= Damita =

American gospel singer (born 1971)

Damita Chandler (born Damita Dawn Bass on September 4, 1971) is an American gospel singer.

== Biography ==
Damita was born as Damita Dawn Bass on September 4, 1971, in Detroit, Michigan.

Damita has an identical twin sister Marguerita Smith.

Damita's musical influences came from both her father and mother.

Damita and her sister formed a female acappella group called Adoration N Prayze in the early 1990s. Damita and her group were asked to sign their first record deal with the gospel record label TM Records, run by Tim Harris and Tanya Harris out of Indianapolis, Indiana.

In 1991, Damita released her first record and made her entrance into the gospel industry professionally with her group Adoration N Prayze. The record, entitled "Time Is Running Out", was produced by long time friend Aaron Lindsay and Alan Abraham. The album went on to receive multiple Stellar Awards nominations.

The group's first single received much recognition in industry. Entitled "He's Wonderful", it was written and arranged by her and the Adoration N Prayze project. This song caught the attention of famous music producer and director and artist Donald Lawrence, who recorded Damita's song again under the title "Great Things" on his 1995 live project "Bible Stories", which was released from Detroit-based gospel label Crystal Rose.

Damita continued to work on music in the industry as well as behind the scenes. Damita became assistant Minister of Music at her church, Unity Cathedral of Faith church under the leadership of Bishop Clarence B. Haddon and Prophetess Joyce R. Haddon, the parents of gospel recording artist Deitrick Haddon.

Damita assisted, sang, co wrote, and arranged songs, directed the choir, and worked beside Deitrick Haddon. Her vocal signature was a major part of the era of Deitrick Haddon & the Voices of Unity. The churches debut album "Come Into This House" was released by Tyscot Records on March 1, 1996. Three months after the recording, Damita and Deitrick were married on June 29, 1996. Damita's lead and background vocals, writing, and producing were featured on every VOU project recorded and helped promote her sound and develop her as an artist.

Damita signed her first solo deal in 2000 by Atlantic Records when Deitrick & the Voices of Unity was performing in Nashville, Tennessee, at an industry function. Afterward, she was asked to sign with the label. Shortly after signing, Damita's first solo project, Damita, was released in 2000. It was produced by R&B producer NoonTime, rock artist Jim Ed Norman from the Eagles, and Arif Mardin. Her second album, No Looking Back, was released in 2008 on Tyscot Records.

Sadly Damita and Deitrick's marriage came to an abrupt end in an unfortunate divorce.

In 2012, Damita released her third solo album and second Tyscot album, Anticipation.

Damita has since remarried to celebrity photographer Reuben Chandler a New York native. The event was officiated by Donnie McClurkin. She continues to minister, encourage, and record.

== Discography ==
- Damita (Atlantic, 2000)
- No Looking Back (Tyscot, 2008)
- Anticipation (Tyscot, 2012)

== Track listing ==
- Damita (2000)
1. "Why"
2. "Truth"
3. "Life"
4. "Spirit Inside"
5. "Calvary"
6. "Hold On To Your Faith"
7. "I Can Feel Him"
8. "If Ever"
9. "Won't Be Afraid"
10. "Real Friend"
11. "The Wedding Song"
12. "Day Go By"
13. "Holdin' On"
- No Looking Back (2008)
1. "Plain & Simple"
2. "Say Yes"
3. "Best Thing"
4. "Midnite"
5. "I Will Trust(Intro)"
6. "I Will Trust"
7. "Great God"
8. "No Looking Back"
9. "Crossing Over"
10. "Don't Leave Me Lonely"
11. "Torn Up"
12. "I Won't Complain"
13. "Pray"
14. "No Looking Back (Pop Gospel Mix)"
- Anticipation (2012)
1. "Won't Turn Back"
2. "Still Here"
3. "Praise U Now"
4. "Amazing God"
5. "Be Revealed"
6. "Elevate Me"
7. "Don't Walk Away"
8. "Anticipation (Waitin 4 U)"
9. "TTLO (Turn The Lights On)"
10. "I Love You"
11. "Super She'ro"
