= Ridgeland-Hardeeville High School =

Location
- 250 Jaguar Trail; Ridgeland, South Carolina 29936; United States
- Coordinates: 32°30′00″N 80°59′15″W

Information
- Type: Public high school
- Motto: Preparing Today's Learners to be Tomorrow's Leaders while exemplifying College and Career Ready Citizens
- Established: 2012 (13 years ago)
- School district: Jasper County School District
- Principal: Kelly Barr
- Teaching staff: 50.00 (FTE)
- Grades: 9–12
- Enrollment: 648 (2023-2024)
- Student to teacher ratio: 12.96
- Campus size: 40 acres (16 ha)
- Campus type: Rural
- Color(s): Black and red
- Mascot: Jaguar
- Feeder schools: Hardeeville-Ridgeland Middle; Hardeeville Elementary; Ridgeland Elementary
- Website: rhs.jcsd.net

Ridgeland-Hardeeville High School or RHHS is a public high school within the Jasper County School District, located in Ridgeland, South Carolina. The high school serves students in all of Jasper County and takes its name after the two major communities in the county, Ridgeland and Hardeeville.

The school was formed in 2012 following the consolidation of Hardeeville High School and Ridgeland High School as part of the JCSD's overall reorganization of schools. RHHS utilizes the facilities of the former Ridgeland High School, whereas Hardeeville-Ridgeland Middle School utilizes the facilities of the former Hardeeville High School.

== History ==
In the post-segregation era, Jasper County made efforts to control costs by consolidating educational facilities. Prior to 2007, all secondary students attended Jasper County High School which was located in close proximity to RHHS. In 2007, the Jasper County School District opened two K-12 facilities in both Hardeeville and Ridgeland, thus creating Hardeeville High School and Ridgeland High School in anticipation of future population growth. However, due to the economic slowdown beginning in 2008 and limited AP course offerings at both facilities, JCSD decided to merge the two middle schools and two high schools for the 2012–2013 school year.

Critics of the merger have pointed to potentially long bus rides for students from various points of the county. Other critics suggested that the consolidation of the schools was prompted due to rumors that the State of South Carolina was about to take over the operation of the failing Ridgeland Middle School and the creation of Hardeeville-Ridgeland Middle School (by consolidation) would prevent the takeover.

== Athletics ==
RHHS competes at the Class 3A level in the South Carolina High School League.
