= Live at Oak Tree: The Series =

- Created by: Daywind Records
- Country of origin: United States

Original release
- Network: INSP

Live at Oak Tree: The Series is a TV series from Daywind Records that airs on The Inspiration Network. The series presents many artists behind-the-scenes during all the preparation and recording of a live presentation.

== The Series ==
Daywind Records started releasing the presentations of the series as CDs and DVDs. These are some of the ones they've released:

| Artist | Release date | Notes |
|---|---|---|
| Austins Bridge | March 31, 2009 | The album was nominated to 4 Dove Awards: Country Album of the Year; Long Form Music Video of the Year; Inspirational Recorded Song of the Year ("Hold On To Jesus"); Country Recorded Song of the Year ("Dry Bones") |
| Crabb Revival | March 31, 2009 | |
| Aaron & Amanda Crabb | July 21, 2009 | The album was nominated to a Dove Award: Inspirational Album of the Year |
| Legacy Five | November 6, 2009 | |
| The Booth Brothers | November 12, 2009 | |
| Jeff & Sheri Easter | March 30, 2010 | |
| Sisters | May 11, 2010 | |
| Karen Peck and New River | April 6, 2010 | The album was nominated to a Grammy Award: Best Southern, Country, Or Bluegrass Gospel Album |
| Greater Vision | July 26, 2010 | |
| Clint Brown | December 7, 2010 | |
| Judy Jacobs | December 14, 2010 | |
