= Once upon a Shattered Life =

Once Upon a Shattered Life

Studio album by Seventh Day Slumber
- Released: February 1, 2005
- Studio: Compound Recording
- Genre: Christian rock
- Label: BEC
- Producer: Aaron Sprinkle

Seventh Day Slumber chronology
Picking up the Pieces (2003)	Once Upon a Shattered Life (2005)	Picking up the Pieces (2005)

Professional ratings
Review scores
Source	Rating
Jesus Freak Hideout	4/5 stars
New Release Today	4/5 stars
Cross Rhythms	8/10

Once Upon a Shattered Life is the fourth studio album by American Christian rock band Seventh Day Slumber. It was produced by Aaron Sprinkle, and released on February 1, 2005. It is the only album by the band to feature drummer Juan Alvarez. It sold more copies than its predecessor album, and is considered to be the band's breakthrough into the mainstream Christian industry, reaching No. 1 on the Billboard Heatseekers Albums chart.

== Track listing ==
All lyrics are written by Joseph Rojas; all music is composed by Seventh Day Slumber.

No.	Title	Length
1.	"Break Me"	3:18
2.	"Shattered Life"	3:29
3.	"Caroline"	4:07
4.	"Make Believe"	2:58
5.	"I Believe"	4:08
6.	"Back in Time"	3:26
7.	"Brand New Man"	4:08
8.	"Chris' Letter"	3:20
9.	"Masquerade"	3:39
10.	"Oceans from the Rain"	4:09
Total length:		36:42

== Personnel ==
Credits adapted from liner notes.

Seventh Day Slumber

- Joseph Rojas – vocals, guitar
- Jeremy Holderfield – guitar
- Joshua Schwartz – bass
- Juan Alvarez – drums

Additional Personnel

- Aaron Sprinkle – production, backing vocals, guitar
- JR McNeely – mixing
- Brian Gardner – mastering
- Brynn Sanchez – backing vocals
- Zach Hodges – engineering
- Austin Thomason – engineering
