= Meredith Andrews discography =

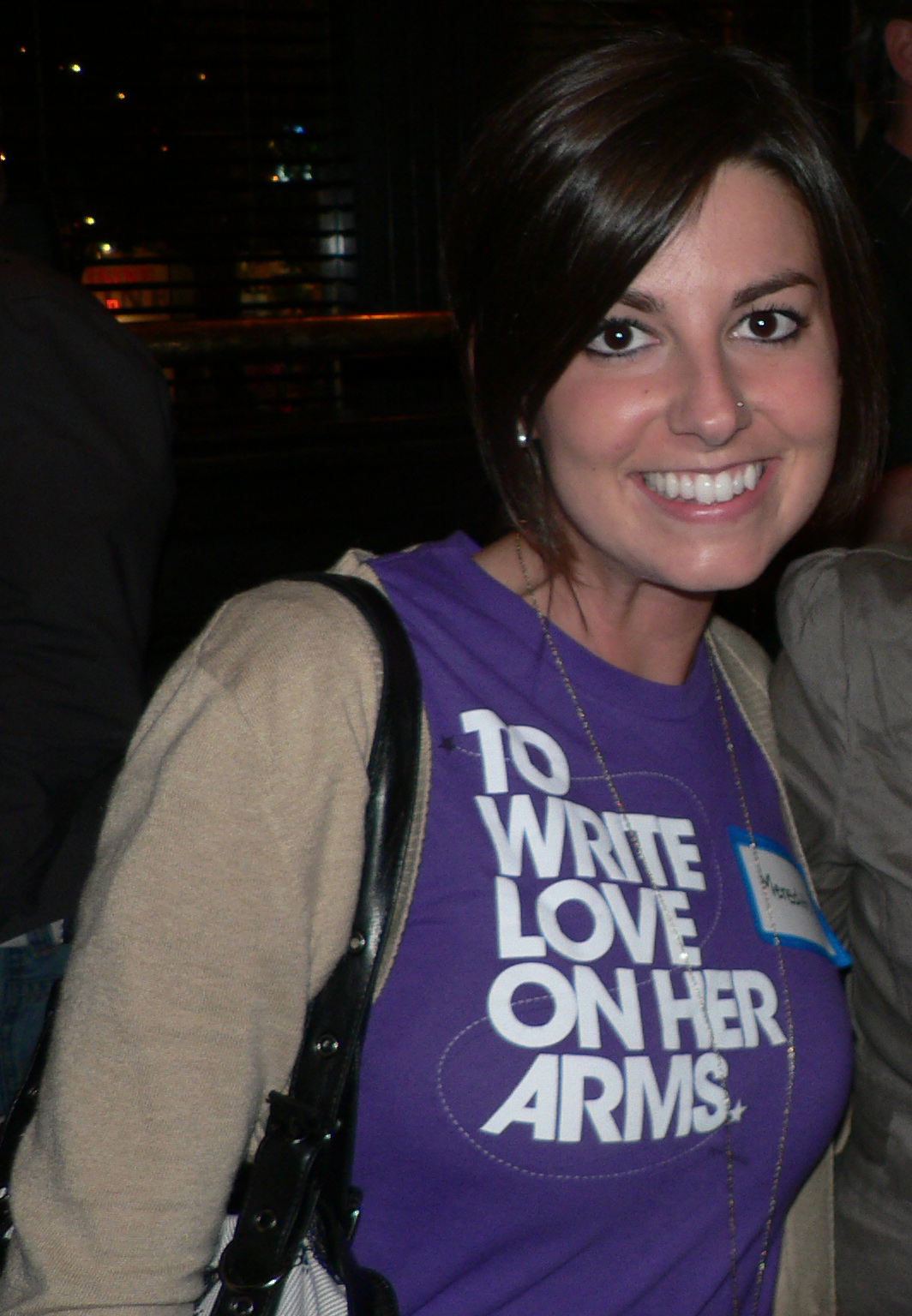
- Andrews in 2008
- Studio albums: 6
- Extended plays: 1
- Singles: 14
- Music videos: 1

The discography of Meredith Andrews, an American singer-songwriter and worship leader. Andrews is signed to Curb Records.

== Albums ==
=== Studio albums ===
Year	Album	Chart Positions		
Year	Album	US	US Christian	US Heat
2005	Mesmerized: Released: April 12, 2005; Label: Independent; Format: CD	—	—	—
2008	The Invitation: Released: April 29, 2008; Label: Word; Format: CD	—	19	—
2010	As Long as It Takes: Released: March 2, 2010; Label: Word; Format: CD	—	12	5
2013	Worth It All: Released: January 22, 2013; Label: Word; Format: CD	144	7	—
2016	Deeper: Released: February 19, 2016; Label: Word; Format: CD	—	9	—
2017	Receive Our King (Christmas album): Release Date: October 27, 2017; Label: Word; Format: CD	—	—	—
2021	Ábrenos Los Cielos: Release Date: May 21, 2021; Label: Word; Format: CD	—	—	—

=== Live albums ===
Year	Album	Chart Positions		
Year	Album	US	US Christian	US Heat
2019	Faith and Wonder: Release Date: March 9, 2019; Label: Word; Format: CD	—	—	—
2024	Heaven's Frequency: Release Date: March 22, 2024; Label: Curb	—	—	—

== EPs ==
Year	Title	Chart positions		Album
Year	Title	US Christ	Christ Airplay	Album
2017	"Behold the Savior"	5	18	Receiving Our King - except "Mary, Did You Know?"

== Singles ==
Year	Single	Chart positions		Album
Year	Single	US Christ	Christ Airplay	Album
2008	"You're Not Alone"	5	18	The Invitation
2009	"You Invite Me In"	17	17	The Invitation
2009	"The New Song We Sing"	34	34	The Invitation
2009	"He Has Come for Us (God Rest Ye Merry Gentlemen)"	9	9	non-album single
2010	"Can Anybody Hear Me"	14	14	As Long as It Takes
2012	"Not for a Moment (After All)"	15	15	Worth It All
2013	"Pieces"	38	36	Worth It All
2014	"Open Up the Heavens"	15	20	Worth It All
2015	"Soar"	21	17	Deeper
2016	"Deeper"	37	25	Deeper
2016	"Receive Our King" (featuring Mike Weaver)	39	16	non-album single
2017	"Spirit of the Living God"	26	20	Deeper
2017	"Come Thou Long Expected Jesus"	32	18	Receive Our King
2018	"Needing You Now"	49	30	non-album single

== Album appearances ==
2008

- "You're Not Alone" – included on Revolve: All Access

2010

- "You're Not Alone" – included on Get the Truth
- "New Song We Sing" – included on WOW Worship: Purple

== Music videos ==
- "You're Not Alone" (2008)
