= The Roys Report =

American investigative journalism website

- Founder: Julie Roys
- Website: roysreport.com
- Launched: 2018; 8 years ago

The Roys Report is a Christian investigative reporting media outlet founded by Julie Roys in 2018 and associated non-profit The Roys Report NFP in 2022.

Roys, an evangelical Christian journalist who graduated from Northwestern University's Medill School of Journalism, worked for Moody Radio from 2007 until she was fired in 2018 for publishing on the Roys Report an exposé of Moody Bible Institute that alleged financial mismanagement, theological drift, and a culture of intimidation.

The Roys Report has reported on many stories that were later picked up by larger news organizations, such as reports of bullying by Northern Seminary's president William Shiell in 2023, who would later resign, and of issues with International House of Prayer in Kansas City and its pastor, Mike Bickle.

The Roys Report published a number of articles about Harvest Bible Chapel and its pastor, James MacDonald. The Roys Report investigation of the Next Level Church in New Hampshire and its lead pastor Jeff Gagnon was followed by the resignation of Gagnon and other executives. Between 2020–2025, The Roys Report published more than 70 articles critical of John MacArthur, including two articles within 24 hours of MacArthur's death.

In 2022, controversy arose regarding Roys' past involvement with a 19-year-old woman when Roys was a youth pastor in her 30s, which she later described in one of her published books as a "dysfunctional relationship." Concerns were raised over the relationship and the inclusion of sensitive personal details about the younger woman. In response to concerns, Roys stepped back from speaking at The Roys Report's 2022 Restore conference.

In 2020, Roys broke the news that Christian speaker Jen Hatmaker was divorcing her husband, Brandon. In August 2025, during an interview to promote her new book, Awake: A Memoir, Hatmaker told The New York Times that she was forced to announce the divorce sooner than planned after Roys, whom Hatmaker described as "a journalist—and I’m using that term loosely," learned about it via public records and published an article about it. Earlier, in response to criticism over her decision to run the story, Roys said someone had sent her the divorce papers, and the divorce was all but certain to become public "with or without me." Hatmaker went further in Awake, saying that Roys had announced the divorce while she was still processing it; she hadn't even had a chance to tell her family. In October, Roys publicly apologized to Hatmaker.
