= Church Songs (Vertical Church Band album) =

Studio album by Vertical Church Band
- Released: January 20, 2015
- Genres: Worship, CCM, pop rock
- Length: 52:48
- Label: Essential Worship
- Producer: Jacob Sooter

Vertical Church Band chronology
The Rock Won't Move (2013)	Church Songs (2015)

Church Songs is the third live album from Vertical Church Band. Essential Worship released the album on January 20, 2015. They worked with Jacob Sooter in the production of this album.

== Critical reception ==
Professional ratings
Review scores
Source	Rating
365 Days of Inspiring Media	4/5 stars
Louder Than the Music	4/5 stars
New Release Today	4/5 stars

Awarding the album four stars at New Release Today, Kevin Davis states, "This is a truly fresh and catchy set of excellent songs for the Church." Joshua Andre, rating the album four stars from 365 Days of Inspiring Media, writes, "Vertical Church Band has done it again!" Giving the album four stars by Louder Than the Music, Jono Davies says, "they seem easy to pick up without being overly simplistic, not an easy task, but one Vertical Church Band have done very well." Reviewing the album for AllMusic, Timothy Monger describes, "Vertical Church Band offers ambitious, warm-toned pop songs with a spiritual message."

== Awards and accolades ==
This album was No. 10, on the Worship Leader's Top 20 Albums of 2015 list.

The song, "Spirit of the Living God", was No. 7, on the Worship Leader's Top 20 Songs of 2015 list.

== Track listing ==
No.	Title	Writer(s)	Length
1.	"All the Earth"	Meredith Andrews, Jason Ingram, Andi Rozier, Jonathan Smith	4:16
2.	"Do What You Want To"	Andrews, Ingram, Jacob Sooter	4:13
3.	"Lamb of God"	Andrews, Ingram, Rozier	4:11
4.	"Spirit of the Living God"	Mia Fieldes, Sooter	5:39
5.	"Psalm 96"		3:51
6.	"It's Who You Are"	Eddie Hoagland, Smith	3:48
7.	"If I Have You"	Fieldes, Rozier, Todd Rukes	3:26
8.	"Shout It Out"	Hoagland, Henry Seeley, Joshua Seller	4:06
9.	"Come Ye Sinners"	Joseph Hart, Hoagland, Ingram, Tyler Miller, Smith	4:44
10.	"None Like You"	Jon Guerra, Miller, Rozier, Sooter	6:04
11.	"Restore My Soul"	Rozier	4:41
12.	"Bound for Glory"	Hank Bentley, Guerra, Hoagland	3:49
Total length:			52:48

== Chart performance ==
Chart (2015)	Peak position
US Billboard 200	31
US Top Christian Albums (Billboard)	1
