= It's Almost Christmas =

It's Almost Christmas may refer to:

- "It's Almost Christmas", Christmas standard, sung by Sheryl Crow and the Muppets, The Whispers, and on It's Almost Christmas (Jon & Valerie Guerra album)
- It's Almost Christmas (Jon & Valerie Guerra album)
- It's Almost Christmas, a 2009 album by Rob Hegel
- "It's Almost Christmas", a 1991 single by Hi-Fi (American band)
- "It's Almost Christmas", a TV episode of Colby's Clubhouse
