= Irma Blanco =

American radio personality

Irma Blanco is an American radio personality from Los Angeles, California. Born and raised of Cuban heritage in Monterey Park, California, she has worked all over the United States, including Miami, San Francisco, Chicago, Los Angeles and Redlands, California.

Formerly of WRCX-FM 103.5 she was the portrayed "voice of reason" for the nationally syndicated morning radio show, Mancow's Morning Madhouse in Chicago, Illinois, hosted by Erich "Mancow" Muller. Blanco was with Mancow from 1994, when the show began in the early 1990s in California and ran until July 1998. WRCX, as well as the parent company, and both Mancow and Irma were sued by Keith Van Horne, a former NFL player, but the lawsuit was settled before she decided to leave the Chicago station.

Blanco previously worked at KBIG 104.3 MYfm in Los Angeles as a news and entertainment co-host on the KBIG morning show, Valentine in the Morning, weekday mornings 5-9 am Pacific Time. Blanco previously co-hosted the morning show with Charlie Tuna.

Blanco has most recently worked at KOLA 99.9 from March 2013 – January 12, 2018, her last day, weekday mornings 5-9 am Pacific Time as a co-host sidekick on "Jesse Duran (and Irma Blanco) in the Morning" to Jesse Duran, previously of 99.1 KGGI.

== See also ==
- Mancow Muller
- Mancow's Morning Madhouse
