= Cono =

Cono may refer to

- Cono Christian School, a Presbyterian church near Walker, Iowa
- City of New Orleans, a passenger train operated by Amtrak from New Orleans, Louisiana, to Chicago, Illinois
- Cono Township, Buchanan County, Iowa, one of sixteen townships in Buchanan County, Iowa
- Coño, a Spanish vulgarity

== See also ==
- Cuno (disambiguation)
