= Walker, Iowa =

- City
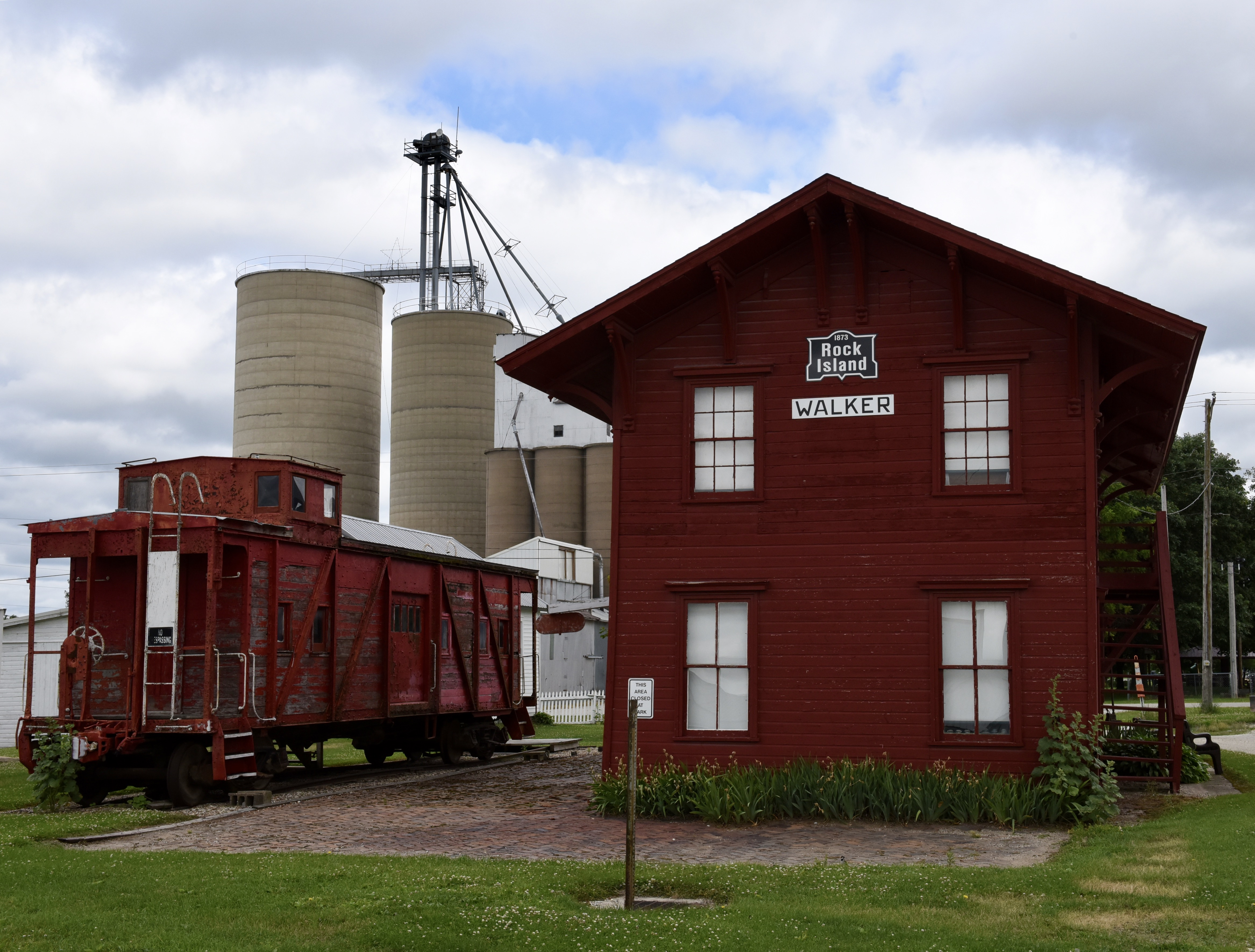
- Burlington, Cedar Rapids, and Minnesota Railroad: Walker Station

- Location of Walker, Iowa
- Coordinates: 42°17′14″N 91°46′51″W
- Country: United States
- State: Iowa
- County: Linn

Area
  - Total: 0.76 sq mi (1.97 km^{2})
  - Land: 0.75 sq mi (1.94 km^{2})
  - Water: 0.012 sq mi (0.03 km^{2})
- Elevation: 899 ft (274 m)

Population (2020)
  - Total: 688
  - Density: 918.8/sq mi (354.74/km^{2})
- Time zone: UTC-6 (Central (CST))
  - Summer (DST): UTC-5 (CDT)
- ZIP code: 52352
- Area code: 319
- FIPS code: 19-81885
- GNIS feature ID: 2397175
- Website: www.cityofwalkeria.org

Walker is a city in Linn County, Iowa, United States. The population in 2020 was 688. It is part of the Cedar Rapids, Iowa metropolitan area.

== History ==
Walker began as an outgrowth of the Burlington, Cedar Rapids and Northern Railway. It was named in honor of W. W. Walker, chief engineer of the railroad.

== Geography ==
According to the United States Census Bureau, the city has a total area of 0.77 square miles (1.99 km^{2}), of which 0.76 square miles (1.97 km^{2}) is land and 0.01 square miles (0.03 km^{2}) is water.

== Demographics ==
Historical populations
Year	Pop.	±%
1900	505	—
1910	517	+2.4%
1920	464	−10.3%
1930	456	−1.7%
1940	462	+1.3%
1950	549	+18.8%
1960	584	+6.4%
1970	622	+6.5%
1980	733	+17.8%
1990	673	−8.2%
2000	750	+11.4%
2010	791	+5.5%
2020	688	−13.0%
Source:"U.S. Census website". United States Census Bureau. and Iowa Data Center; Source: U.S. Decennial Census

=== 2020 census ===
As of the census of 2020, there were 688 people, 278 households, and 185 families residing in the city. The population density was 918.8 inhabitants per square mile (354.7/km^{2}). There were 299 housing units at an average density of 399.3 per square mile (154.2/km^{2}). The racial makeup of the city was 93.5% White, 0.1% Black or African American, 0.0% Native American, 0.1% Asian, 0.0% Pacific Islander, 1.2% from other races and 5.1% from two or more races. Hispanic or Latino persons of any race comprised 0.7% of the population.

Of the 278 households, 32.4% of which had children under the age of 18 living with them, 54.3% were married couples living together, 7.2% were cohabitating couples, 25.5% had a female householder with no spouse or partner present and 12.9% had a male householder with no spouse or partner present. 33.5% of all households were non-families. 25.5% of all households were made up of individuals, 15.8% had someone living alone who was 65 years old or older.

The median age in the city was 41.7 years. 26.6% of the residents were under the age of 20; 5.7% were between the ages of 20 and 24; 21.7% were from 25 and 44; 29.8% were from 45 and 64; and 16.3% were 65 years of age or older. The gender makeup of the city was 48.8% male and 51.2% female.

=== 2010 census ===
As of the census of 2010, there were 791 people, 289 households, and 215 families living in the city. The population density was 1,040.8 inhabitants per square mile (401.9/km^{2}). There were 309 housing units at an average density of 406.6 per square mile (157.0/km^{2}). The racial makeup of the city was 98.0% White, 0.3% African American, 0.4% Native American, 0.1% from other races, and 1.3% from two or more races. Hispanic or Latino of any race were 1.0% of the population.

There were 289 households, of which 41.5% had children under the age of 18 living with them, 59.9% were married couples living together, 9.7% had a female householder with no husband present, 4.8% had a male householder with no wife present, and 25.6% were non-families. 21.1% of all households were made up of individuals, and 12.5% had someone living alone who was 65 years of age or older. The average household size was 2.74 and the average family size was 3.18.

The median age in the city was 34 years. 32.2% of residents were under the age of 18; 6.4% were between the ages of 18 and 24; 26.5% were from 25 to 44; 22.4% were from 45 to 64; and 12.6% were 65 years of age or older. The gender makeup of the city was 48.5% male and 51.5% female.

=== 2000 census ===
As of the census of 2000, there were 750 people, 273 households, and 197 families living in the city. The population density was 1,066.1 inhabitants per square mile (411.6/km^{2}). There were 286 housing units at an average density of 406.6 per square mile (157.0/km^{2}). The racial makeup of the city was 98.67% White, 0.27% African American, 0.53% Native American, and 0.53% from two or more races.

There were 273 households, out of which 40.3% had children under the age of 18 living with them, 62.6% were married couples living together, 7.3% had a female householder with no husband present, and 27.5% were non-families. 22.7% of all households were made up of individuals, and 13.2% had someone living alone who was 65 years of age or older. The average household size was 2.75 and the average family size was 3.23.

30.7% were under the age of 18, 8.5% from 18 to 24, 30.3% from 25 to 44, 18.7% from 45 to 64, and 11.9% were 65 years of age or older. The median age was 33 years. For every 100 females, there were 94.3 males. For every 100 females age 18 and over, there were 86.4 males.

The median income for a household in the city was $43,438, and the median income for a family was $50,556. Males had a median income of $34,271 versus $23,618 for females. The per capita income for the city was $16,258. About 4.1% of families and 5.2% of the population were below the poverty line, including 6.6% of those under age 18 and 8.5% of those age 65 or over.

== Education ==
The North Linn Community School District operates area public schools. Just north of Walker was Cono Christian School, an international boarding school, founded by Max Belz in 1948, now used as a summer camp and retreat center.

== Notable people ==
- Joel Belz, journalist, publisher
- Clifton Brady, Seattle-based architect
- Luella Klein, obstetrician-gynecologist
