= World (magazine) =

Monthly Christian news magazine

- Executive Editor: Leigh Jones
- Categories: news, religion, culture, politics
- Frequency: Monthly
- Circulation: 41,831
- Founder: Joel Belz
- First issue: 1986
- Company: World News Group/God's World Publications
- Country: United States
- Based in: Asheville, North Carolina
- Language: English
- Website: wng.org
- ISSN: 0888-157X

World (often stylized in all-caps as WORLD) is a monthly Christian news magazine, published in the United States by World News Group, a non-profit 501(c)(3) organization based in Asheville, North Carolina. World's declared perspective is one of Christian evangelical Protestantism.

Each issue features both U.S. and international news, cultural analysis, editorials and commentary, as well as book, music and movie reviews. World's end-of-the-year issue covers stories from the previous year, obituaries, and statistics.

== History ==
World was launched by Joel Belz in 1986 as a publication of The Presbyterian Journal, a theologically conservative magazine founded in 1942. However, due to low readership and financial difficulties, The Presbyterian Journal cancelled the publication that June. Belz convinced the board of The Presbyterian Journal to shut down operations and reallocate its resources to World, which relaunched in 1987. It started with about 5,000 subscribers and the publishers initially requested donations in every issue to stay afloat. At its peak, World had a circulation exceeding 160,000.

In 2005, Nick Eicher replaced Joel Belz as CEO and World considered moving its headquarters to a different city. Eicher made the decision to move the company's business model away from focusing on ad sales. (By 2025, the company said nearly 90 percent of its revenue is derived from subscriptions and charitable contributions.) In 2008, World switched from publishing weekly to biweekly. That same year Eicher was succeeded by Kevin Martin. In July 2011, World moved its office from Innsbruck Mall in Asheville to a former bank building in Biltmore Village.

In 2012, World began referring to itself as World News Group, which includes its print, digital, and broadcast properties. In 2014, Nick Eicher became Chief Content Officer, responsible for all editorial content for the organization.

In 2021, Marvin Olasky's tenure as editor-in-chief of World Magazine ended, but he continued working with the magazine until 2022, and he hoped to continue working with World Journalism Institute beyond that time.

In July 2024, World changed its magazine from printing biweekly to monthly. Three months later, in late September, World's two buildings in Biltmore Village were destroyed during Hurricane Helene.

== Editorial team ==
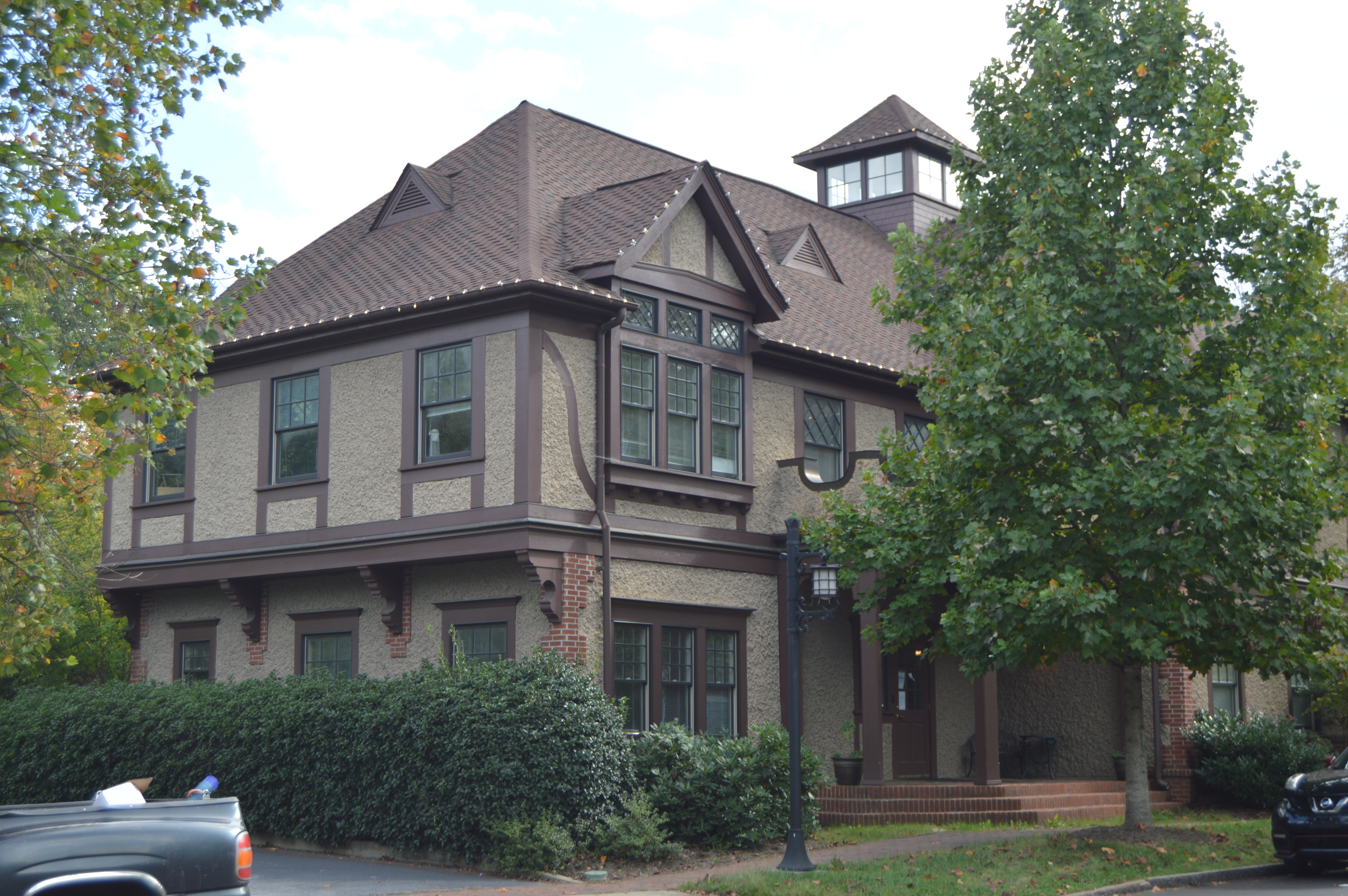
Offices in Biltmore Village, Asheville, destroyed in Tropical Storm Helene.

World News Group's editorial staff is led by an editorial council of senior editors and producers. The current members of the editorial council are Brian Basham (Program Director-World Watch), Paul Butler (Training Director), Rebecca Cochrane (Editorial Director-God's World News), Leigh Jones (Executive Editor-Features and Editor-WORLD Magazine), Tim Lamer (Executive Editor—Commentary and Digital); Daniel James Devine (Executive Editor-News); and Nick Eicher (Executive Producer--WORLD Radio).

Unlike World's business staff, which works almost entirely in Asheville, the majority of its editorial and production staff live elsewhere.

=== Editors of World Magazine ===
1. Joel Belz (1986-1994)
2. Marvin Olasky (1994-2001)
3. Nick Eicher (2001-2004)
4. Mindy Belz (2004-2015)
5. Tim Lamer (2015-2020)
6. Michael Reneau (2020-2022)
7. Tim Lamer (2022, interim)
8. Lynn Vincent (2022-2024)
9. Les Sillars (2025)
10. Leigh Jones (2026 - present)

== Coverage of evangelical controversies ==
World has received positive critical commentary from the New York Times regarding its investigative reporting on controversies within the evangelical Christian community.

In an August 29, 2009, cover story, World reported on the C Street Center in Washington, D.C., and the secretive organization behind it, the Fellowship, a.k.a. "The Family". Scott Horton of Harper's Magazine praised the piece, saying the magazine's "attitude is critical and exacting. The piece looks like serious journalism, much like the publication's exposé work on Ralph Reed and other scandals in the past." Rachel Maddow, on her August 17, 2009, show said, "The article exposes The Family's mysterious money trail and describes the C Street scandals using the word 'scandal' and argues that The Family subscribes to a, quote, 'muddy theology' and it harbors, quote, 'a disdain for the established church.'"

The magazine reported that Christian apologist and conservative political commentator Dinesh D'Souza had shared a hotel room with his fiancée prior to filing for divorce from his previous wife. After World broke the story, D'Souza resigned as president of New York's The King's College in response.

In December 2018, World's investigative report on Harvest Bible Chapel and its pastor, James MacDonald, led to a shakeup at the suburban Chicago megachurch. The article written by freelance writer Julie Roys included detailed information on financial mismanagement and a culture of deception and intimidation at the church. On February 13, 2019, the elders of the church announced the firing of MacDonald.

== World Digital ==
World's digital properties are headed by Executive Editor Tim Lamer. The World website includes daily news stories, including daily news briefs called "The Sift," weekly news roundups and editorial cartoons. World's magazine content is also available through its apps for iOS, Android, and Amazon Kindle devices.

== World Radio ==
On August 6, 2011, World launched a weekly two-hour radio news program called The World and Everything in It. Hosted by executive producer Nick Eicher and senior producer Joseph Slife, the program aired weekends on U.S. stations and featured reports, interviews, and analysis from the organization's editorial team. In May 2013, The World and Everything in It became a 30-minute daily podcast. Slife left the program in May 2017 and was replaced as co-host by Mary Reichard.
