= Las Vegas Raiderettes =

NFL Cheerleading squad for the Las Vegas Raiders

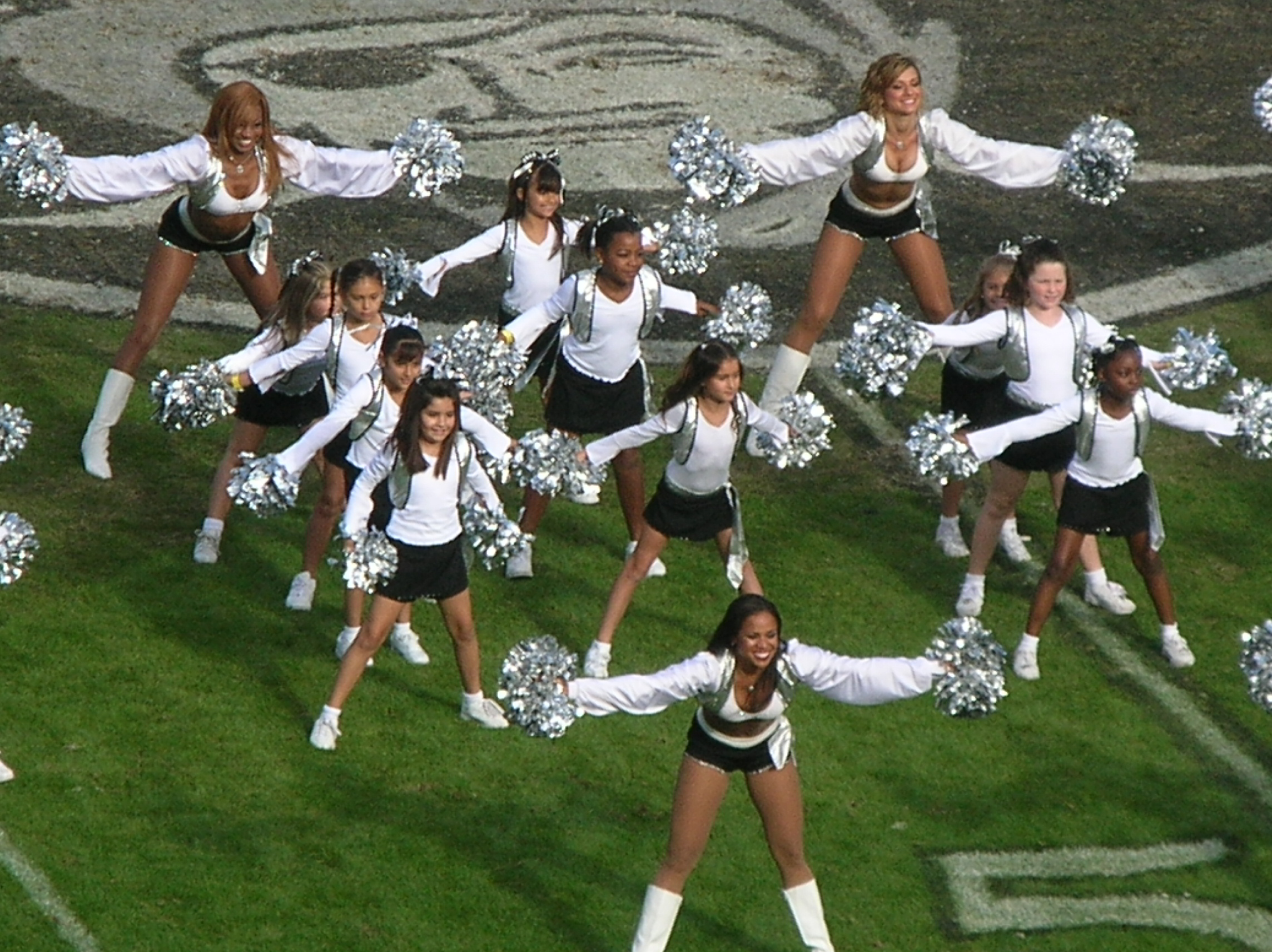
- Raiderettes and Jr. Raiderettes
- Established: 1961; 65 years ago
- Members: 40
- Director: Jeanette Thompson (2011 season); Shawna Zimmerman (2010 season); Vandana Patel (Game 1 of 2010 season)
- Affiliations: Las Vegas Raiders
- Website: www.raiders.com/raiderettes/
- Formerly called: Oakland Raiderettes (first incarnation, 1961–1982); Los Angeles Raiderettes (1982–1995); Oakland Raiderettes (second incarnation, 1995–2019)

The Las Vegas Raiderettes are the cheerleading squad for the Las Vegas Raiders professional American football team. They were established in 1961 as the Oakland Raiderettes. When the Raiders moved to Los Angeles in 1982, the cheerleading squad became known as the Los Angeles Raiderettes. When the franchise moved back to Oakland in 1995, the Raiderettes changed their name back to the Oakland Raiderettes and when the franchise moved to Las Vegas in 2020 they became the Las Vegas Raiderettes. In Los Angeles, Oakland, and Las Vegas they have been billed as "Football's Fabulous Females".

Upon the move of the team to Las Vegas, a new 20,000-square-foot studio was constructed for the Raiderettes in Henderson in between the Raiders headquarters and practice facility and the practice facility of the Las Vegas Aces of the WNBA.

== Lawsuit ==
In 2017, a class-action lawsuit brought by the Raiderettes against the Raiders was settled for $1.25 million. The suit, brought in 2014 by 90 cheerleaders, was the first case in the NFL to claim wage theft and other violations of labor law were being perpetrated on the cheer squad by the Raiders franchise. Cheerleaders for other NFL teams followed with similar wage theft lawsuits after the success of the Raiderette case.

== Notable former cheerleaders ==
A number of former cheerleaders have found success outside the organization including:

- Anjelah Johnson – stand-up comedian and former MADtv cast member
- Jalina Porter – American political advisor and former government spokesperson
- Anjanette Abayari – model, and actress in the Philippines
- Kiana Tom – TV fitness instructor, Bench Warmer model, actress
- Emily Compagno – Fox News Personality
