= James MacDonald (pastor) =

Canadian-American pastor and author

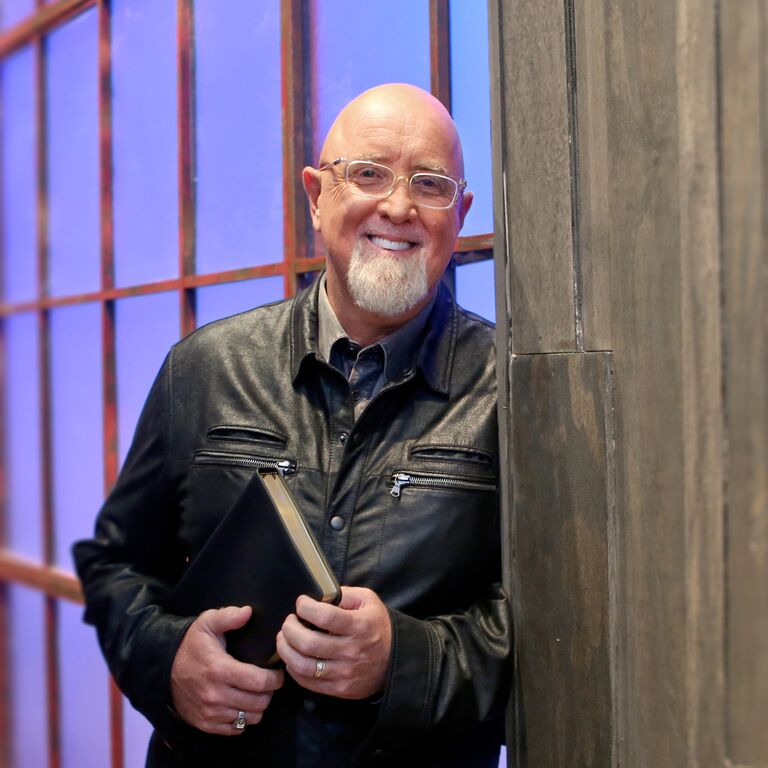
- Born: October 4, 1960 (age 64); London, Ontario, Canada
- Occupation(s): Pastor, author, Bible teacher
- Spouse: Kathy MacDonald

James MacDonald (born October 4, 1960) is a Canadian-born evangelical Christian pastor, television evangelist, and author. He was the senior pastor of Harvest Bible Chapel megachurch in Rolling Meadows, Illinois, United States and was the host for the church's former broadcast ministry, Walk in the Word.

MacDonald was fired from Harvest Bible Chapel in 2019 after over 30 years as senior pastor following allegations that he had engaged in conduct "harmful to the best interests of the church."

== Harvest Bible Chapel ==
Harvest Bible Chapel grew from eighteen people meeting in a local high school in 1988 to more than 13,000 in 2012, attending on seven campuses in the Chicago area. The congregation moved into a converted warehouse in Rolling Meadows, Illinois in 1995. Harvest added campuses in Elgin and Niles in 2004; Crystal Lake in 2007; the downtown Chicago in 2010 (the "Chicago Cathedral"); Aurora in 2011; and Deerfield Road in 2012. The church was included in Outreach Magazine's "Top 100 Fastest Growing Churches in America" and "Top 100 Largest Churches in America."

== Walk in the Word ==
Launched in 1997, Walk in the Word was Harvest's radio teaching ministry. By 2016 it was heard on more than 1,100 radio and television outlets across North America. In 2012, and again in 2016, the program received the "Billy Graham Award for Excellence in Christian Communication" from the National Religious Broadcasters (NRB).

In February 2019, MacDonald announced that Walk in the Word would no longer be broadcast on radio and television, but would be available in digital format, citing the financial strain stemming from the controversies surrounding him. Harvest announced on May 9, 2019, that "Walk in the Word is a ministry of Harvest Bible Chapel and as such, it is under the direction of Harvest's leadership," and "[at] this time, Harvest has decided to take down the Walk in the Word website until further notice." Harvest also decided to not launch digital content and revealed that it had been returning contributions to Walk in the Word since the beginning of March 2019.

== Vertical Worship ==
Vertical Worship is Harvest's worship and songwriting ministry. Launched formally in 2012 as Vertical Church Band, their song "Open Up the Heavens", co-authored by MacDonald, was nominated in 2014 for Worship Song of the Year at the 45th GMA Dove Awards.

== Controversies and allegations ==
=== 2013 excommunication of former elders ===
In October 2013, World reported: "As MacDonald and Harvest celebrate 25 years of ministry, they face a barrage of criticism from former elders, pastors, and staff who say the church leadership has operated in recent years with too little transparency and accountability." After three elders resigned their positions, citing a "culture of fear and intimidation," Harvest publicly reprimanded two of them and removed them from church membership. The discipline was meted out soon after a group of former elders had laid out concerns about MacDonald's character in a letter to the remaining elders. In September 2014, Harvest and MacDonald apologized for their actions toward the two former elders and lifted the church discipline against them.

=== 2018 defamation lawsuit ===
In October 2018, MacDonald and Harvest filed a libel lawsuit against The Elephant's Debt bloggers Ryan Mahoney and Scott Bryant, and against journalist Julie Roys. Mahoney, Bryant and Roys had reported that Harvest was in significant debt, that the church had previously been near bankruptcy, and that MacDonald had gambling problems. The suit was filed in Cook County Circuit Court and used as its basis the Illinois Deceptive Trade Practices Act. MacDonald claimed that his intent in filing the suit was not to seek punitive or financial damages, but only to force the defendants to cease publishing these allegations.

Harvest announced that it was dropping its lawsuit in early January 2019, "after a Cook County judge [...] ruled against the church's request to keep some documents private." Church elders said that the decision left them without any means of protecting third parties, saying, "In good conscience we cannot knowingly subject innocent people, in many instances against their will, to a full subpoena process." They announced that they would undertake a "peacemaking process" in the wake of dropping the suit. At the same time, they announced that MacDonald would go on indefinite sabbatical to atone for patterns of behaviour "that can only be called sin," but would be available to take part in the peacemaking process upon request. On April 30, 2019, the outgoing elders of Harvest Bible Chapel issued an apology for having filed the 2018 lawsuit, and they paid Roys $50,000 as a settlement to cover her legal fees.

=== Accusations, sabbatical, and firing from Harvest Bible Chapel ===
Over time, former Harvest members, elders, and staff have accused MacDonald of bullying, sexual harassment, authoritarian behaviour and lack of transparency in finances, as well as misappropriation of church funds. In December 2018, World published Roys' expose on MacDonald and Harvest, outlining an alleged history of financial mismanagement and abusive leadership by the pastor. The church disputed these claims.

Outside groups also faced criticism for scheduling MacDonald for conferences and speaking events. In December 2018, it was announced that MacDonald had withdrawn from his speaking slot at the 2019 Southern Baptist Convention Pastors' Conference.

On January 16, 2019, MacDonald took an "indefinite sabbatical from all preaching and leadership," saying in a statement that he has "...battled cycles of injustice, hurt, anger, and fear which have wounded others without cause", and that as a result he has "...carried great shame about this pattern in certain relationships that can only be called sin."

On January 25, Chicago radio shock jock Mancow Muller, who described himself as a Harvest attendee and a friend of MacDonald, publicly criticized MacDonald's leadership, called for the elders of Harvest to be removed, urged church members to stop making financial contributions until needed changes were made, and asserted that an outside group should be brought in to lead the church.

On February 13, MacDonald was fired from Harvest by the church's elders after alleged recordings of him making inappropriate comments. In the recordings, MacDonald joked about orchestrating a plot to blackmail Harold Smith, the CEO of Christianity Today magazine, by planting illegal child pornography on Smith's computer.

=== Financial improprieties ===
On April 17, 2019, after years of claims of financial mismanagement, the Evangelical Council for Financial Accountability (ECFA) terminated Harvest's membership due to "significant violations" of four of seven of ECFA's Seven Standards of Responsible Stewardship. Later reports indicated that MacDonald had used funds from the Walk in the Word ministry to purchase a vintage 1971 Volkswagen Beetle (valued at approximately $13,000) for Ed Stetzer, a contributing editor at Christianity Today. Stetzer reimbursed the ministry in full after learning that ministry funds had been used for the gift. MacDonald also reportedly used church funds to purchase Harley-Davidson motorcycles for "people inside and outside the church."

=== Alleged solicitation to commit murder ===
In May 2019, Mancow Muller claimed that MacDonald had, on two different occasions in 2018, asked Muller if he knew of a hitman for hire. Similarly, former Harvest bodyguard Emmanuel Bucur stated that MacDonald had asked him in 2015 to kill MacDonald's former son-in-law. Bucur and Muller reported their allegations to the police of their respective Illinois towns of Bartlett and Wilmette on May 18, 2019, and an investigation was commenced.

=== 2023 assault charge ===
On March 22, 2023, MacDonald was arrested for allegedly assaulting a 59-year-old woman in a parking lot.

== Personal life ==
MacDonald married his wife, Kathy, in 1983. They have three children, Luke, Landon, and Abby, and eight grandchildren.

== Bibliography ==
On February 19, 2019, Moody Publishers, which had published most of MacDonald's books, said that those titles were no longer available for sale. In addition, LifeWay (the publishing arm of the Southern Baptist Convention) said it would no longer publish or carry MacDonald's books or other materials.

- I Really Want to Change… So, Help Me God (Moody, 2000) ISBN 0-80243423-1
- Lord, Change My Attitude… Before It's Too Late (Moody, 2001) ISBN 978-0-80243439-5
- Seven Words to Change Your Family (Moody, 2002) ISBN 978-0-80243440-1
- God Wrote a Book (Crossway, 2002) ISBN 978-1-58134622-0
- Gripped by the Greatness of God (Moody, 2005) ISBN 978-1-41582921-9
- Downpour: He Will Come to Us Like the Rain (Broadman & Holman, 2006) ISBN 978-0-80544199-4
- Ancient Wisdom (Broadman & Holman, 2007) ISBN 978-0-80544428-5
- Preaching: 25 things you can't learn in school (Walk in the Word, 2007)
- Way of Wisdom (Walk in the Word, 2007)
- Restore My Soul: A Fresh Look at Psalm 23 (Walk in the Word, 2008)
- 10 Choices: A Proven Plan to Change Your Life Forever (Thomas Nelson, 2008) ISBN 0-78522820-9
- When Life Is Hard (Moody, 2010) ISBN 978-0-80245870-4
- Always True (Moody, 2011) ISBN 978-0-80245869-8
- Lord Change Me (Moody, 2012; revised edition of the book previously titled I Really Want to Change… So Help Me, God) ISBN 978-0-80240526-5
- Vertical Church (David C. Cook, 2012) ISBN 978-1-43470372-9
- Authentic: Developing the Disciplines of a Sincere Faith (Moody, 2012) ISBN 978-0-80245717-2
- Come Home: A Call Back to Faith (Moody, 2013) ISBN 978-0-80245718-9
- Act Like Men (Moody, 2014) ISBN 978-0-80245719-6
- The Will of God IS the Word of God (Broadman & Holman, 2017) ISBN 978-1-43365027-7
