= The Resurrection of Gavin Stone =

- Theatrical release poster
- Directed by: Dallas Jenkins
- Written by: Andrea Gyertson Nasfell
- Produced by: Fred Adams; John Bolin; Larry Douglas; Jamie Elliott; Michael J. Luisi; Ralph E. Portillo
- Starring: Brett Dalton; Anjelah Johnson-Reyes; Neil Flynn; Shawn Michaels; D. B. Sweeney
- Cinematography: Lyn Moncrief
- Edited by: Kenneth Marsten
- Music by: Jeehun Hwang
- Production companies: Vertical Church Films; Power in Faith; Walden Media
- Distributed by: WWE Studios; BH Tilt
- Release date: January 20, 2017
- Running time: 91 minutes
- Country: United States
- Language: English
- Budget: $2 million
- Box office: $2.3 million

The Resurrection of Gavin Stone is a 2017 American Christian comedy drama film directed by Dallas Jenkins and written by Andrea Gyertson Nasfell. Starring Brett Dalton, Anjelah Johnson-Reyes, Neil Flynn, Shawn Michaels and D. B. Sweeney, the film was released by WWE Studios and Blumhouse Tilt on January 20, 2017.

== Plot ==
Former child star Gavin Stone is now a washed-up, partied-out man. When he is forced to return home, he pretends to be a Christian so he can portray Jesus in an Easter play being produced by a megachurch.

== Cast ==
- Brett Dalton as Gavin Stone
- Anjelah Johnson-Reyes as Kelly Richardson, the good girl
- Neil Flynn as Waylon Stone
- Shawn Michaels as Doug, the ex-con
- D. B. Sweeney as Pastor Allen Richardson
- Tim Frank as John Mark
- Liam Matthews as Charles
- Christopher Maleki as Mike Meara
- Patrick Gagnon as Anthony

== Release ==
On July 29, 2015, it was announced that WWE Studios had acquired worldwide rights to the faith-based comedy from Vertical Church Films. On July 20, 2016, Vertical Church Films announced that the film would be released on January 20, 2017.

== Critical response ==
On Rotten Tomatoes, the film has an approval rating of 54% based on 13 reviews and an average rating of 5.3/10. On Metacritic, the film has a score 36 out of 100 based on 5 critics, indicating "generally unfavorable reviews".
