= Vertical Worship =

American Christian band

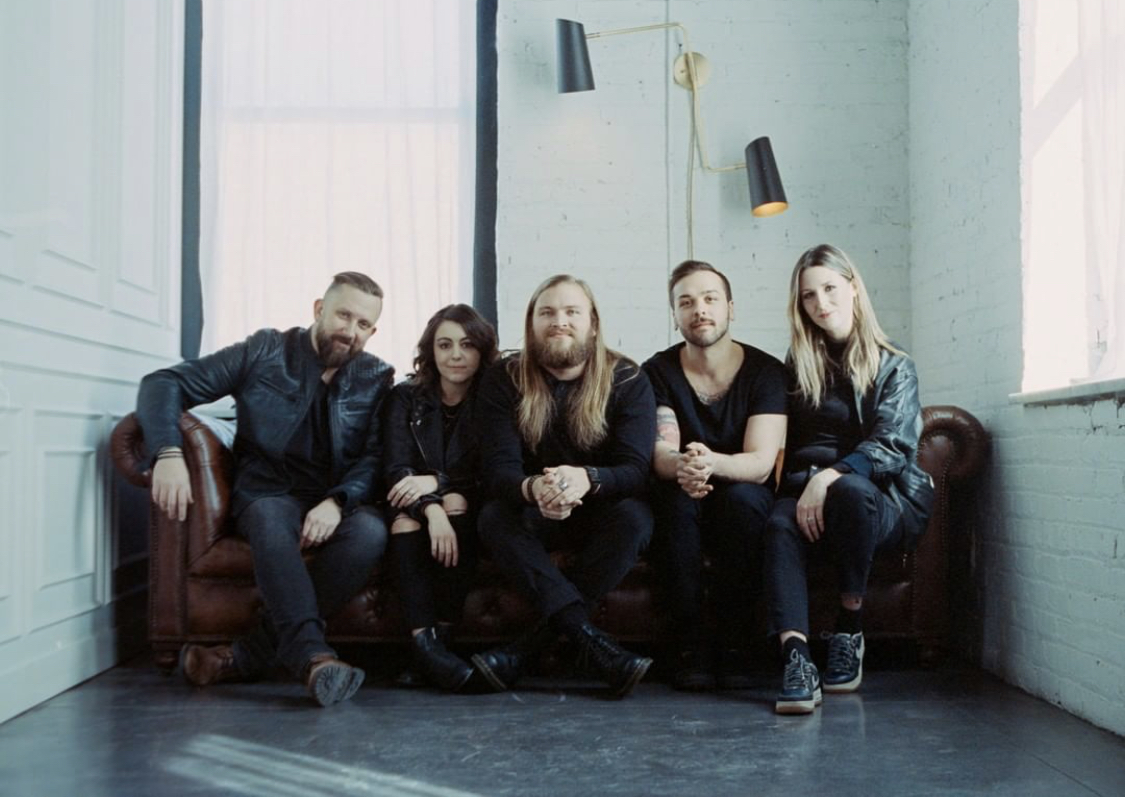

Background information
- Origin: Rolling Meadows, Illinois
- Genres: CCM; gospel; worship; rock
- Years active: 2012–present
- Label: Essential
- Members: Jake France; Judd Harris; Robert Titean; James Herlo; Zac Moore
- Past members: Kyle Smith; Andi Rozier; Lauren Smith; Kyle Fredricks; Meredith Andrews; Jon Guerra; Seth McConkey; Lindsay McCaul; Heather Headley; Jacob Sooter; Tara Cruz; Kyle Rahtjen; Tim Dalrymple; Vanessa Dalrymple
- Website: www.verticalofficial.com

Vertical Worship, previously known as Vertical Church Band, is a contemporary Christian and worship band from Rolling Meadows, Illinois, as part of the Harvest Bible Chapel. They are signed to Provident Label Group and have released eight albums through Essential Records: Live Worship from Vertical Church in 2012; Rock Won't Move in 2013; Church Songs on January 16, 2015; Frontiers on July 29, 2016; the self-titled album, Vertical Worship, in 2017; Bright Faith Bold Future on April 6, 2018; Grace Is On Our Side on March 13, 2020; and Build an Altar on September 6, 2024.

== Background ==
The music collective, from Rolling Meadows, Illinois, form Harvest Bible Chapel and started making music in 2012. They have since released multiple worship records.

The band released Live Worship from Vertical Church on July 31, 2012 on Essential Records and it peaked on Billboard's Christian Albums chart at No. 10 and No. 9 on the Heetseekers Albums chart. Vertical EP was released on May 7, 2013. It was followed by The Rock Won't Move on October 29, 2013 and charted at No. 58 on the Billboard 200, No. 2 on the Christian Albums chart. White EP was released on November 4, 2014. Their third album, Church Songs, was released on January 20, 2015 and peaked at No. 31 on the Billboard 200 and topped the Christian Albums chart and was followed by the "Church Songs Tour & Workshop" national tour concluding in June, 2015.

== Members ==
Current

- Jake France – worship leader and electric guitar, 2016-current
- Judd Harris – worship leader and acoustic guitar, 2018-current
- Robert Titean – electric guitar, 2014-current
- James Herlo – bass guitar, 2014-current
- Zac Moore – drums, 2018-current

Former

- Tim Dalrymple - worship leader and electric guitar, 2021-2025
- Vanessa Dalrymple - worship leader and acoustic guitar, 2021-2025
- Lauren Smith – worship leader and acoustic guitar, 2016-2022
- Kyle Smith – worship leader, electric guitar, keys, and musical director, 2016-2022
- Andi Rozier – worship leader and acoustic guitar, 2012-2021. (now at New Life Church)
- Kyle Fredricks – worship leader and acoustic guitar, 2012–2017
- Meredith Andrews – worship leader, 2012–2017
- Jon Guerra – worship leader and acoustic guitar, 2012-2020
- Jacob Sooter – worship leader, acoustic guitar, keys, and musical director, 2012–2017
- Seth McConkey – worship leader
- Lindsay McCaul – worship leader
- Heather Headley – worship leader
- Tara Cruz - worship leader, 2012-2021
- Kyle Rahtjen - keyboards, bass guitar, 2012-2019

== Discography ==
=== EPs ===
- Vertical EP (May 7, 2013, Essential Worship)
- White EP (November 4, 2014, Essential Worship)
- Planetarium EP (August 31, 2018, Essential Worship)
- Yes I Will - EP (March 29, 2019, Essential Worship)

=== Albums ===
List of Albums, with selected chart positions
Title	Album details	Peak chart positions			
Title	Album details	US	US Christ	US Heat	CAN
Live Worship from Vertical Church	Released: July 31, 2012; Label: Vertical Church Band/Harvest Bible Chapel/Essential Worship; Formats: CD, digital download	—	10	9	—
The Rock Won't Move	Released: October 29, 2013; Label: Harvest Bible Chapel/Essential Worship; Formats: CD, digital download	58	2	—	—
Church Songs	Released: January 20, 2015; Label: Vertical Church Band/Essential; Formats: CD, digital download	31	1	—	—
Frontiers	Released: July 29, 2016; Label: Vertical Church Band/Essential; Formats: CD, digital download	46	2	—	85
Vertical Worship	Released: August 4, 2017; Label: Essential Worship; Formats: CD, digital download	—	— (Note: Vertical Worship did not enter the Billboard Top Christian Albums chart, but peaked at number 33 on the Billboard Christian Album Sales chart.)	—	—
Bright Faith Bold Future	Released: April 6, 2018; Label: Essential Worship; Formats: CD, digital download	—	25	—	—
Yes I Will: Songs from Vertical Worship	Compilation album; Released: January 10, 2020; Label: Essential Worship; Formats: Digital download	—	—	—	—
Grace Is On Our Side	Live album; Released: March 13, 2020; Label: Essential Worship; Formats: CD, digital download	—	—	—	—

=== Singles ===
Year	Single	Chart positions			Certifications	Album
Year	Single	US Christ	Christ Airplay	Christ AC	Certifications	Album
2018	"Yes I Will"	7	7	8	RIAA: Gold	Bright Faith Bold Future

== Awards ==
=== GMA Dove Awards ===
Year	Nominee / work	Award	Result
2019	"Yes I Will"	Worship Song of the Year	Nominated
