= Luella Klein =

American obstetrician and gynecologist (1924–2019)

Luella Mae Bare Voogd Klein-Colquitt (October 24, 1924 – January 13, 2019) was an American obstetrician-gynecologist. She was the Charles Howard Candler Professor at Emory University School of Medicine. She became the first female department chair in at Emory School of Medicine on March 1, 1986. She was the first female president of the American College of Obstetricians and Gynecologists. Klein was an advocate for equality in healthcare for adolescent, low-income, incarcerated, and LGBTQI+ women, women of color, women with disabilities, women with HIV, and other underserved populations.

== Early life and education ==
Klein was born in Walker, Iowa to Leah Stunkard and Elmer De Witt Bare of Walker, Iowa. She Graduated summa cum laude from University of Iowa with a bachelor of arts in 1946. She completed her M.D. at University of Iowa in 1949 and was elected to Alpha Omega Alpha. She was one of two women in her class. She interned at Case Western Reserve University and completed training in internal medicine and general surgery before doing a residency in obstetrics and gynecology in 1955.

== Career ==
Klein joined the obstetrics and gynecology faculty at the Case Western School of Medicine. From 1955 to 1957, she attended University of London as a Fulbright scholar. From 1958 to 1960, she was an obstetrics consultant for the Georgia Department of Public Health. Klein was the assistant director of clinical research at Bristol Laboratories in Syracuse, New York from 1965 to 1967. In 1967, she joined the faculty at Emory University. In 1988, she was made the Charles Howard Candler Professor. She served as the first woman of the department of gynecology and obstetrics at Emory University from 1986 to 1993. She retired from Emory University at the age of 89.

Klein was an advocate for equality in healthcare for adolescent, low-income, incarcerated, and LGBTQI+ women, women of color, women with disabilities, women with HIV, and other undeserved populations. She made contributions to women's healthcare and reproductive health policy.

== Personal life ==
Klein was married to Alfred O. Colquitt who died in 2005. She died on January 13, 2019, at the age of 94. Klein was survived by 3 stepsons, 9 grandchildren, 8 grandchildren, and 3 nieces and nephews. A service was held at the Glenn Memorial United Methodist Church on the Emory University campus.

== Awards and honors ==
Klein was fellow of the American College of Obstetricians and Gynecologists (ACOG) and served as the first woman president of the organization in 1984. She was a member of the Institute Of Medicine. Klein received the Elizabeth Blackwell Medal. The ACOG named the Luella Klein Lifetime Achievement Award in her honor.
