= Mancow's Morning Madhouse =

American syndicated radio program

- Genre: Talk
- Running time: 4 hours 5:30–10 AM CT
- Country of origin: United States
- Home station: WRCX (1994-1998), WKQX (1998-2006), WLUP (2015-2018)
- Hosted by: Mancow Muller; Cathy the Greek; Al Roker Jr.; Abe the Chameleon
- Starring: Mancow Muller
- Produced by: Cathy Vlahogiannis, Abe Kanan, Midge Ripoli, Ken Smith
- Original release: July 1994 – March 2018
- No. of episodes: Unknown
- Opening theme: Here comes the Mancow
- Website: www.mancow.com
- Podcast: audioboom.com/channel/mancow-morning-show

Mancow's Morning Madhouse (also called The Mancow Radio Experience or simply The Mancow Show) was an American radio show hosted by Erich "Mancow" Muller.

From the mid-1990s until the mid-2000s, it was one of the top morning shows in the Chicago media market, and earned airtime in various cities across America via syndication. The show was last broadcast exclusively on WLUP-FM 97.9 The Loop.

== History ==
Mancow first started his show in Chicago, Illinois in 1994, shortly after his departure from California. Originally, the show was a regular program on WRCX (Rock 103.5). In 1998, he left WRCX for WKQX/101.1 ("Q101"), an alternative rock radio station.

Mancow's career with Q101 ended on July 11, 2006, when the station's management decided to discontinue airing the show as of July 14. In order to fill the gap left behind by the show's absence, Q101 filled the void with the station's "On Shuffle" music programming and later a new show titled The Morning Fix.

On July 13, Mancow appeared on WFLD, and lashed out at Q101's current management after receiving word that his show would be cancelled. Before the interview ended, Mancow promised he would not only return to the Chicago radio scene, but also bring forth a radical change, either within the next six or twelve months.

In December 2010, Mancow signed a multi-year joint deal with Talk Radio Network and Dial Global. The new deal called for a revamped version of the show focusing less on political talk and more on entertainment and pop culture.

In September 2011, after a five-year absence from the local Chicago airwaves, Mancow's show began airing on WJJG in Elmhurst.

On October 22, 2012, a televised version of the radio show began airing locally in Chicago on WPWR-TV weekdays 6–8 AM CT.

On January 6, 2014, syndication of the program moved from Talk Radio Network to Genesis Communications Network.

On October 9, 2014, Mancow announced he would be taking a break from both radio and television following WPWR-TV's decision not to renew his television show. The final live broadcast actually took place on September 26, 2014. Genesis Communications Network continued to be broadcast replays until April 17, 2015.

From March 2015 to March 2018, Mancow hosted mornings on WLUP (now WCKL (FM).

From 2018-2020, Mancow hosted a late-morning show on WLS (AM).

=== FCC problems ===
Mancow's Morning Madhouse ran afoul with the Federal Communications Commission (FCC) indecency regulations in at least six separate incidents during 2000 and 2001. As a result, the FCC levied $42,000 in fines on Emmis Communications, the licensee of Mancow's then-home station WKQX. In 2004, Emmis Communications signed a consent decree with the FCC sharply restricting indecent content and requiring the payment of $300,000 to the U.S. government.

== Roster ==
- Al Roker Jr. (Ken Smith), Co-host and sports reporter from May 1997 – July 2010 and March 2015 – 2018.
- Abe the Chameleon (Abe Kanan), Co-host September 2001 – July 2006 and March 2015 – 2018. Played a number of characters including Leslie Anderson.
- Cathy the Greek (Cathy Vlahogiannis), Co-host and producer/guest booker from August 2000 – December 2002. Co-host, producer/guest booker, and traffic/weather reporter from March 2015 – 2018.
- DJ Luv Cheez (Midge Ripoli), Technical producer from 1994 – October 2008 and March 2015 – 2018.
- Irma Blanco, known as "The voice of reason", or the “Cuban Bombshell”.
- Turd the Bartender (Jeff Renzetti), Involved in many infamous stunts and live remotes. Left after Q101 dropped the show in 2006. Appeared occasionally from 2015-2020, usually via phone. Now known as "Turd the Trash Man".
- Freak (Wally Kozielski), traffic and music reporter.
- Cowboy Ray (Ray Hofstatter). Hofstatter was killed in a hit-and-run automobile accident as profiled on the Fox television series, America's Most Wanted.

== Radio show segments ==
Mancow's Morning Madhouse has, over the years, developed a repertoire of daily acts, some of which changed frequently, and others that were discontinued. Among these radio acts are:

- ADD News: "It takes a minute and gets you up to the minute". A montage of audio clips from various television news sources with the latest headlines in under a minute.
- The Answer is C: Participants are given a "quiz" where the staff reads out a question with a multiple choice answer of 'A,' 'B,' or 'C.' The answer is always 'C,' and is usually highly sarcastic in content.
- Baby Song: A clip of a popular song is played on a glockenspiel. Callers try to guess the song.
- Chop Song-ee: A contest where segments of a popular song are played backwards and callers can try to guess the song. This act is accompanies by a satirical impression of a Chinese man, complete with fake karate sounds in the background.
- Christopher Walken Theater: A staff member performing an over-the-top, satirical impression of actor Christopher Walken reads lines from a movie, and then has callers try to guess the movie.
- Cowboy Ray's Time Capsule: A contest where Cowboy Ray lists a number of events from a certain year. Callers try to guess the year.
- Chuck Norris Facts: The staff reads from a list of hyperbolic praises of actor Chuck Norris.
- Death Psychic: A fake psychic would come on the air, and claim to predict how people die. The death psychic was played by comedian Hope Colt. Later on, this was turned into the car psychic. The car psychic was played by comedian Katie McDonald.
- Drunk Chick Friday: Muller invites a group of (supposedly) attractive women to visit the studio on Friday mornings, who then become highly intoxicated and obnoxious as the show progresses.
- Fact or Schiznit: The staff reads unusual items and offers prizes to callers who can distinguish between the true and false items.
- 'Humm job: It could be a song, a commercial, perhaps a repetitive song in a video game. The idea was that if you heard something repetitive it would be stuck in your head all day long.
- Kiss the Mancow: A member of the Mancow militia speaks as Gene Simmons of KISS and reads the words to a song in an identical voice of Simmons. Listeners call in and guess the correct song.
- Mancow Mystery Movie: A quote/phrase from a movie is played and callers must try to guess the name of the movie.
- Mystery Ringtones: Mancow plays a ringtone from a cellphone on the air, and callers try to identify what song it is from, usually from popular culture or 80s/90s music.
- On the Streets: Mancow's on-the-streets report.
- One Minute Inside a Woman's Head: A segment devoted to the thoughts and ponderings of a typical woman about everyday life, from her boyfriend, to skin cancer, to cosmetics, to her mother and so on. It has also been done as One Minute Inside a Man's Head.
- Mancow Minions: Fans calling other radio shows and messing with them. Akin to Opie and Anthony's Pests
- Party Patrol: Celebrity gossip and commentary with Leslie Anderson.
- Phone Scams: The term the show uses to describe prank calls. Typically, the show broadcasts the prank calls ten minutes after the hour.
- Reality Bites: An update of happenings on all currently-airing reality television shows, delivered by DJ Luv Cheese.
- Skid Theater: The staff pays homeless Chicagoans to act out scenes from movies, and then holds a contest for listeners to name the movie.
- Sports With Al Roker Jr.: The show's sports news segment, delivered by Al Roker Jr. The segment always opens with the line, "Open wide for Chunky...," and always ends with the catchphrase, "Kiss my black ass if you don't like it."
- Tales from the Crib: Al Roker Jr. opens by saying, "Tell me why you hate white people", followed by a black person's response.
- They want our jobs, but they suck: Clips from other radio shows that are really bad in comparison. A blatant rip off of "Opie and Anthony's Jocktober".
- Vintage Video Game: A track is played off a retro video game system (such as Arcade, Sega Genesis, or Nintendo) and callers must try to guess the name of the video game
