= Joel Belz =

American publisher (1941–2024)

- Born: August 10, 1941; Marshalltown, Iowa, U.S.
- Died: February 4, 2024 (aged 82); Asheville, North Carolina, U.S.
- Education: University of Iowa (BA, MA)
- Known for: Founding WORLD magazine
- Spouses: Diana Ewing (m. 1967; div. 1974) Carol Esther Jackson (m. 1975)
- Children: 5

Joel Belz (August 10, 1941 – February 4, 2024) was an American publisher who was the founder of WORLD News Group, which began with It's God's World for Children in 1981 and today includes all of the God's World News magazines for students; WORLD magazine, a biweekly Christian newsmagazine, launched in 1986; the World Journalism Institute, started in 1999; WORLD Watch, a daily video news program for students; various news websites; and a daily news podcast.

== Biography ==
Belz was born on August 10, 1941 to Max Victor Belz and Jean Franzenburg Belz in Marshalltown, Iowa. Belz was raised in the grain and lumber business, but learned the importance of the print media when his parents opened up a printing business out of their home. In 1946, his father entered the Presbyterian ministry and in 1951, his parents opened Cono Christian School.

When Belz was eleven years old, he learned how to operate a linotype press and attempted to start a printing business as a freshman at Covenant College. However, his printing press broke after he dropped the machine while moving it downstairs to the school basement. Belz earned a BA in English from Covenant College in St. Louis, Missouri in 1962 and an MA in communications from the University of Iowa. He served as a board member for Covenant College for decades, teaching logic and English, and was a member and elder in the Presbyterian Church in America. In 1964, Belz helped the college move from St. Louis, Missouri to Lookout Mountain, Georgia and helped found Lookout Mountain Christian School, which today operates as Chattanooga Christian School. While he served as headmaster of Lookout Mountain Christian School, Belz actively recruited black students from Chattanooga, Tennessee, increasing their enrollment to make up about one-third of the school's student body.

=== Publishing career ===
In 1977, he moved with his family to Asheville, North Carolina and started working for The Presbyterian Journal, a theologically conservative news publication, eventually becoming interim editor. Belz became heavily involved with Asheville Christian Academy, the school his daughters attended, joining the board of directors. He also helped found Covenant Reformed Presbyterian Church in 1980 and remained a member until his death. In 1981, Belz founded the publication It's God's World (Note: Later called God's World News.) for middle school aged children and subsequently launched similar publications for other age groups. After receiving requests from parents for an adult magazine, he helped launch WORLD magazine in 1986, publishing its first issue in March of that year. Due to low readership and financial difficulties, the magazine was cancelled in June after thirteen issues. However, Belz persuaded The Presbyterian Journal board members to shut down and reallocate their resources to WORLD, which relaunched the following year.

After the relaunch, WORLD initially struggled to maintain operations. Belz's family became heavily involved in the business, with his brother designing the magazine layout and his sister-in-law writing many columns and training other journalists. Over the years, World News Group expanded to include a daily podcast and websites.

Belz helped start the World Journalism Institute in 1999 to train journalists who are Christians that are committed to factual reporting. By the time Belz died, the institute had trained more than 700 people. Some of the journalists it trained have worked for publications including The New York Times, The Wall Street Journal, USA Today, and Christianity Today.

In November 2009, Belz signed an ecumenical statement known as the Manhattan Declaration, calling on evangelicals, Catholics, and Eastern Orthodox Christians to promote a pro-life culture and support the Biblical definition of marriage, the lifelong union between one man and one woman.

=== Personal life ===
Belz married Carol Esther Jackson in 1975 and moved in 1977 to Asheville, North Carolina, where they raised five daughters together. Belz died there, reportedly of Parkinson's disease, on February 4, 2024 at the age of 82.
