= Rusty Varenkamp =

American Christian musician (born 1976)

- Also known as: Rusty
- Origin: Nashville, Tennessee
- Genres: Christian
- Occupations: music producer, composer, songwriter, music editor, programmer, lyricist, music engineer, music mixer, music arranger, guitarist, keyboardist, pianist, drummer
- Instruments: electric guitar, drums, keys, piano
- Years active: 2003–present
- Website: rustyvarenkamp.com

Rusty Varenkamp is an American Christian musician, who is mainly a music producer and songwriter. He has received two GMA Dove Awards, for production, and is a Grammy Award-nominated producer and songwriter.

== Music career ==
His music production songwriting career commenced around 2003, where he has won GMA Dove Awards for Producer of the Year at the 41st Annual Awards, and his production of As Long as It Takes from Meredith Andrews, for Praise & Worship Album of the Year at the 42nd GMA Dove Awards. He has been nominated for his songwriting and music production at the Grammy Awards.
