= The Invitation (Meredith Andrews album) =

Studio album by Meredith Andrews
- Released: April 29, 2008
- Studios: Emack and The Smoakstack (Nashville, Tennessee)
- Genres: Contemporary Christian, worship
- Length: 44:47
- Label: Word
- Producers: Jason Ingram; Rusty Varenkamp

Meredith Andrews chronology
Mesmerized (2005)	The Invitation (2008)	As Long as It Takes (2010)

Professional ratings
Review scores
Source	Rating
Jesus Freak Hideout	3/5 stars

The Invitation is the second studio album released by Christian singer Meredith Andrews.

== Track listing ==
All songs were written or co-written by Andrews; additional writers are listed below.

No.	Title	Writer(s)	Length
1.	"You Invite Me In"	Jason Ingram	3:28
2.	"Lift Up Your Head"	Ingram	3:37
3.	"You're Not Alone"		4:05
4.	"Treasure"	Ingram, Doug McKelvey	3:46
5.	"Show Me What It Means"	Ingram, Matt Bronlewee	4:19
6.	"Deeper"	Ingram	3:58
7.	"The River"		5:05
8.	"New Song We Sing"	Ingram, Keith Everette Smith	3:53
9.	"Who Is like You"		3:56
10.	"Draw Me Nearer"	Michael Farren, Ingram	4:37
11.	"You're Not Alone (Acoustic Version)"		4:07

== Personnel ==
- Meredith Andrews – vocals, backing vocals
- Jason Ingram – acoustic piano, programming, backing vocals
- Rusty Varenkamp – programming, backing vocals
- Paul Moak – electric guitars
- Mike Payne – acoustic guitars
- Tony Lucido – bass
- Will Sayles – drums
- Chris Carmichael – strings
- Ned Henry – strings

=== Production ===
- Conor Farley – executive producer
- Jason Ingram – producer
- Rusty Varenkamp – producer, engineer, editing, drum editing
- Tom Laune – mixing
- Ted Jensen – mastering at Sterling Sound (New York, NY)
- Katherine Petillo – art direction
- Alexis Goodman – design
- David Bean – photography
- Amber Lehman – stylist
- Robin Geary – hair, make-up
- Mitchell White – management

== Awards ==
The album was nominated for a Dove Award for Praise & Worship Album of the Year at the 40th GMA Dove Awards.
