= It's Almost Christmas (Jon & Valerie Guerra album) =

Studio album by Jon & Valerie Guerra
- Released: November 13, 2015
- Genre: Christmas, Folk
- Length: 36:59
- Label: Descendant

Jon & Valerie Guerra chronology
Little Songs (2015)	It's Almost Christmas (2015)

It's Almost Christmas is the first Christmas album by the husband and wife duo, Jon & Valerie Guerra. Descendant Records (Sony) released the album on November 13, 2015.

== Critical reception ==
Professional ratings
Review scores
Source	Rating
Jesus Freak Hideout	2/5 stars
Jesus Wired	9/10 stars
New Release Today	4/5 stars

In December 2015 (and again in December 2016), Jon & Valerie Guerra opened for Amy Grant and Vince Gill's "Christmas at the Ryman" concerts at the venerable Ryman Auditorium in Nashville, TN.

Awarding the album four stars from New Release Today, Phronsie Howell states, "Jon & Valerie did a bang-up job bringing the Christmas spirit to listeners." Of the track "Beginning to Feel like Christmas," Elmore Magazine states, "Jon and Valerie's new song is likely to find its way into your Christmas tradition." Bersain Beristain, rating the album two stars at Jesus Freak Hideout, writes, "It's Almost Christmas might have more in common with...generic holiday selections". Giving the album a nine out of ten stars for Jesus Wired, Rebekah Joy says, "Both Jon and Valerie carry such powerful, and beautiful voices, that blend together so well."

Southern Living featured the duo with an exclusive video premier, and the album has also been featured in Acoustic Guitar, Fearless Radio, Relevant Magazine, The Daily Country, and HNGN.com.

== Residence ==
Jon Guerra & Valerie Strattan Guerra reside in Chicago, Illinois.

== Track listing ==
No.	Title	Writer(s)	Length
1.	"Winter Wonderland"	Felix Bernard (music)	2:30
2.	"It's Almost Christmas"		4:35
3.	"The Way You Look Tonight / I'll Be Home for Christmas"	Jerome Kern	2:42
4.	"Have Yourself a Merry Little Christmas"	Hugh Martin	3:00
5.	"White Christmas"		2:32
6.	"Edelweiss"		2:33
7.	"Beginning to Feel like Christmas"		3:14
8.	"The Little Drummer Boy"		3:44
9.	"Will I See You at Grandma's House?"		3:05
10.	"Auld Lang Syne"		4:10
11.	"Lord Remind Me"		4:54
Total length:			36:59
