= Deeper (Meredith Andrews album) =

Studio album by Meredith Andrews
- Released: February 19, 2016
- Genre: Worship; Christian pop; Christian EDM; electropop; synthpop
- Length: 46:34
- Label: Word
- Producer: Jason Ingram; Paul Mabury; Seth Mosley; Mike X. O'Connor; Jacob Sooter

Meredith Andrews chronology
Worth It All (2013)	Deeper (2016)	Receive Our King (2017)

Deeper is the fifth studio album by Meredith Andrews. Word Records released the album on February 19, 2016. Andrews worked with producers, Jason Ingram, Paul Mabury, Seth Mosley, Mike X. O'Connor, Jacob Sooter, in the production of this album.

== Background ==
The producers she chose to work with to make the music for this album was her husband, Jacob Lee Sooter, and four others, Jason Ingram, Seth Mosley, Paul Mabury, and Mike X. O'Connor. The lead single "Soar" was released to radio in late 2015.

== Critical reception ==
Professional ratings
Review scores
Source	Rating
365 Days of Inspiring Media	5/5 stars
CCM Magazine	4.5/5 stars
The Christian Beat	4.5/5 stars
Cross Rhythms	10/10 squares
Jesus Wired	83/100
Jesus Freak Hideout	3/5 stars
New Release Today	3.5/5 stars
Today's Christian Entertainment	4/5 stars
Worship Leader	4/5 stars

Awarding the album four and a half stars from CCM Magazine, Matt Conner states, "While already a successful recording artist, Andrews has yet to breakthrough to true stardom, but Deeper might do the trick. The songs are here, as well as the stories. It’s more of the same from Andrews, and we wouldn’t have it any other way." Jeremy Armstrong, giving the album four stars at Worship Leader, writes, "Ultimately, Deeper is a reminder of his promise to complete the work he began in those who love him. And the result is a powerful offering of praise, an offering that gathers hearts toward the arms of the Father". Stephen Luff, indicating in a ten out of ten review at Cross Rhythms, says, "this is truly an album which will feed the spirit for months and probably years to come."

Rating the album five stars for 365 Days of Inspiring Media, Jonathan Andre describes, "Deeper, by all accounts, may even top Meredith’s previous album recording, in both lyrical and musical content." Amanda Brogan-DeWilde, allocating the album three and a half stars by New Release Today, says, "Deeper carries the classic worship album sound and feel. It's soft, positive and drenched in Scripture." Allotting the album four and a half stars at The Christian Beat, Madeleine Dittmer responds, "The songs on Deeper shine brightly, while addressing the darkness we find within and around us, and offer an invitation to push for the hope of a new day." Laura Chambers, affixing the album with a 4.1 star rating at Today's Christian Entertainment, replies, "The overarching theme of Deeper is faithfulness; throughout, we see pictures of God's unwavering love and devotion to us, the kind we long to echo back...Meredith Andrews takes us by the hand and invites us to delve Deeper into the mystery of grace with her, that we might be able to proclaim as she does using examples from our own testimonies."

Taylor Berglund, reviewing the album for Charisma, writes, "With her fourth album, Deeper, she may well join their ranks [(Michael W. Smith, Natalie Grant, Big Daddy Weave, Matt Maher, and Phil Wickham)] in the world of Christian radio. For better or worse, Deeper is an album bursting with mainstream worship appeal, with an easily enjoyable mix of dance-able synth-pop and emotional power ballads...Overall, Deeper is not a challenging album, but it doesn't need to be. Andrews has written an uplifting album that all believers can appreciate." Giving the album an 83-percent at Jesus Wired, Rebekah Joy says, "throughout this album Meredith Andrews has managed to display not only her power and talent musically, but also through the meaning and inspirational messages." Bersain Beristain, signaling in a three star review at Jesus Freak Hideout, cautions, "Though Deeper may be polished to a near perfect degree in production and performance, I still find it lacking greatly in originality as far as the actual content is concerned."

== Track listing ==
Standard version
No.	Title	Writer(s)	Length
1.	"Sunrise"	Meredith Andrews, Mia Fieldes, Seth Mosley	3:50
2.	"Deeper"	Andrews, Fieldes, Jacob Lee Sooter	3:54
3.	"I Look to the King"	Andrews, Matt Maher, Sooter	4:46
4.	"Spirit of the Living God"	Fieldes, Sooter	5:20
5.	"Soar"	Andrews, Fieldes, Mosley	3:56
6.	"Extravagant"	Andrews, Jason Ingram, Andi Rozier	5:00
7.	"Glory"	Andrews, Audrey Assad, Bryan Brown	4:28
8.	"Trusted"	Andrews, Fieldes, Ingram	3:28
9.	"Impossible"	Andrews, Paul Duncan, Paul Mabury	3:36
10.	"Hands That Are Holding Me"	Andrews, Hank Bentley, Jeffrey Tyler Miller	4:23
11.	"Take Me Back"	Andrews, Benji Cowart, Sooter	3:53
Total length:			46:34

Deluxe version
No.	Title	Writer(s)	Length
12.	"Lamb of God"	Andrews, Ingram, Rozier	4:17
13.	"Christ Is Enough"	Reuben Morgan, Jonas Myrin	5:26
14.	"Jesus Sees"	Andrews, Ingram	4:01
Total length:			60:18

== Personnel ==
- Meredith Andrews – vocals, backing vocals
- Seth Mosley – keyboards, programming, guitars, acoustic guitars
- Jacob Sooter – keyboards, synthesizers, synth bass, programming, acoustic guitars, electric guitars, slide guitar, bass guitar
- Andrew DeRoberts – guitars
- Mike Payne – guitars, acoustic guitars, electric guitars
- Tony Lucido – bass guitar
- Matthew Melton – bass guitar
- Ben Phillips – drums
- Paul Mabury – drums, drum programming
- Nir Z – drums
- Cara Fox – cello
- Chris Carmichael – strings

== Chart performance ==
Chart (2016)	Peak position
US Christian Albums (Billboard)	9
