= Anjelah Johnson =

American actress

Anjelah Johnson-Reyes
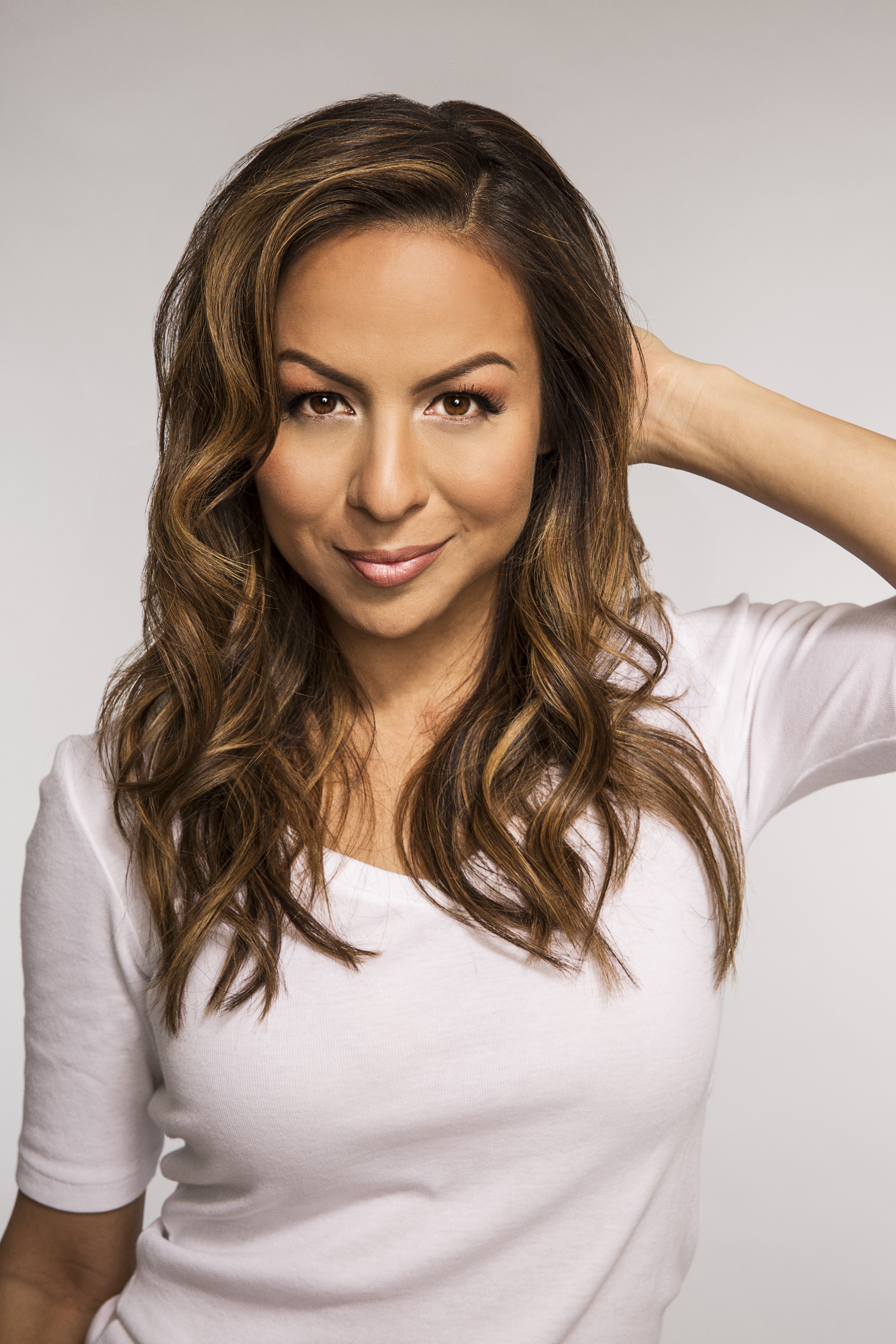
- Born: May 14, 1982 (age 44); San Jose, California, U.S.
- Spouse: Manwell Reyes (m. 2011)
- Children: 1

Comedy career
- Years active: 2006–present
- Medium: Stand-up; television; film
- Genres: Observational comedy; surreal humor; satire
- Subjects: Latin American culture; everyday life; sports; gender differences
- Website: anjelah.com

Anjelah Johnson-Reyes (born May 14, 1982) is an American actress, stand-up comedian, and former NFL cheerleader. She was a cast member on the series MADtv during its 13th season. Her characters included a Vietnamese nail salon employee named Mỹ Linh/Tammy and a rude fast food employee turned music star named Bon Qui Qui (the latter of which has become popular outside of Johnson's short stint on MADtv).

== Career ==
She became a cheerleader for the Oakland Raiders after joining in 2002. As a member of the Oakland Raiderettes, she was named Rookie of the Year and performed at Super Bowl XXXVII in San Diego. She moved to Los Angeles in 2005 to pursue a career in comedy after a friend suggested that she join a joke-writing class. She took improv classes and quickly began to headline her own shows. Her stand-up routine, comprising her impression of a Vietnamese nail salon employee, received many views on YouTube.

In 2007, Johnson joined the cast of sketch comedy show MADtv as a featured performer. Due to the impending writers strike, she was often given only a few lines in the scripts, as the writers had to produce more scripts at a faster pace. Her self-scripted character Bon Qui Qui, a fast-food employee who treats customers rudely, was popular and gained a similarly large YouTube following. In 2008, she was nominated for an ALMA Award for Outstanding Female Performance in a Comedy Television Series for her work on MADtv. In 2013, she reprised her role as her MADtv character Bon Qui Qui for a skit released by Alexander Wang, a fashion designer. Johnson was given her own one-hour Comedy Central special, Anjelah Johnson: That's How We Do It, in 2009. She appeared in the film Our Family Wedding (2010) and voice for the live-action adaptation of Marmaduke. She was featured on the late night talk show Lopez Tonight, on TBS hosted by George Lopez. Johnson became the "TC Girl", a spokesperson for Taco Cabana, a Mexican restaurant, in 2011.

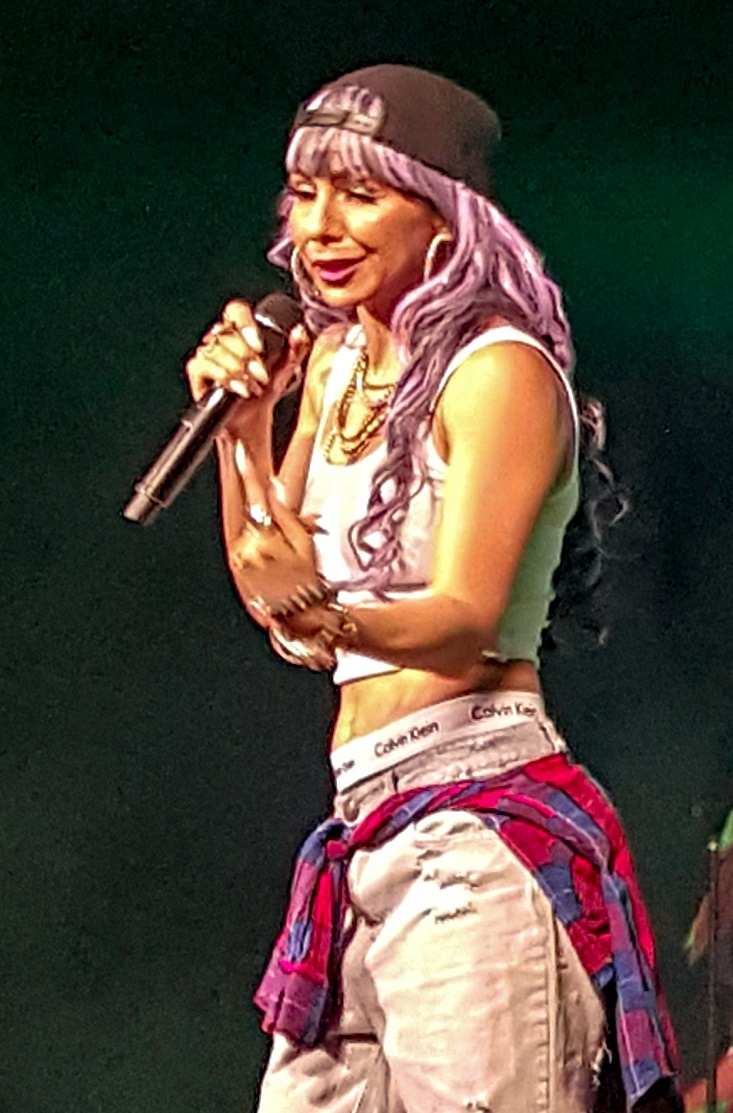
Johnson as Bon Qui Qui at the McAllen Convention Center in McAllen, Texas, April 2016

Johnson's second stand-up comedy special titled Homecoming Show premiered on Netflix and it was filmed in San Jose, California. On October 1, 2015, Johnson's third stand-up special, titled Anjelah Johnson: Not Fancy, was filmed in southern California and released on Netflix.

== Personal life ==
Born on May 14, 1982, Johnson was born in San Jose, California and grew up there, in a devout Christian family and she is a Christian. She is of Mexican and Native American descent. She was a Pop Warner cheerleader beginning when she was eight, in soccer, softball, track, and in hip hop and break dancing. She began acting as a senior in high school and was especially interested in imitating different accents. She later studied speech communications at De Anza College in Cupertino, California.

Johnson and musician Manwell Reyes of Group 1 Crew married on June 11, 2011, in Half Moon Bay, California. On December 29, 2022 they announced they were expecting a baby in 2023. Johnson gave birth to the couple's daughter in June 2023.

== Filmography ==
=== Film ===
Year	Title	Role
2007	The Box	
2009	Alvin and the Chipmunks: The Squeakquel	Julie Ortega
2010	Our Family Wedding	Isabel
2010	That's How We Do It!	Herself
2010	Marmaduke	Afghan #2 (voice)
2013	Enough Said	Cathy
2014	Moms' Night Out	Restaurant Hostess
2014	The Book of Life	Adelita / Nina (voice)
2017	The Resurrection of Gavin Stone	Kelly Richardson
2020	The Opening Act	
2023	Candy Cane Lane	Shelly

=== Stand-up releases ===
Year	Title	Studio	Formats
2009	Anjelah Johnson: That's How We Do It	Comedy Central	DVD/CD/audio & video download/streaming
2013	Anjelah Johnson: Homecoming Show	Netflix/Tubi	DVD/audio download/streaming
2015	Anjelah Johnson: Not Fancy	Netflix	Audio download/video streaming
2017	Anjelah Johnson: Mahalo & Goodnight	Tubi	DVD/CD/audio & video download/streaming
2023	Anjelah Johnson-Reyes: Say I Won't	Tubi	Audio download/video streaming
2024	Anjelah Johnson-Reyes: Technically Not Stalking	YouTube	Audio download/video streaming
2026	Anjelah Johnson-Reyes: Ugly Baby	Youtube	Audio download/video streaming

=== Television ===
Year	Title	Role	Total episodes
2006	Love, Inc.	Female Client	1
2007	On the Up	Herself	
2007–2008, 2016	MADtv	Various characters	4
2008	Untitled Dave Caplan Pilot	Maria	
2008	The Movie Preview Awards	Herself	
2009	Comedy Central	Herself	
2010	Ugly Betty	Wendy	
2010	Lopez Tonight	Herself	
2011	Curb Your Enthusiasm	Mimi	Season 8, Episode 4 ("The Smiley Face")
2016	MADtv 20th Anniversary Reunion	Bon Qui Qui	
2018	Have You Been Paying Attention?	Herself	1
2019	Superstore	Robin Green	1
2022	The Real Dirty Dancing	Herself	4
2023	Hell's Kitchen	Herself	Episode: "Just Bring the DARN Fish!"

== Discography ==
=== Studio albums ===
as Bon Qui Qui:

Title	Album details
Gold Plated Dreams	Released: January 20, 2015; Format: CD, digital download; Label:Warner Music Nashville

=== Extended plays ===
as Bon Qui Qui:

- The Come Up (2012)

== Music videos ==
as Bon Qui Qui:

Title	Year	Director
"I'm a Cut You"	2012	DG
"No Boyfren" (featuring Tammy)	2013	DG
"This Is How We Do It" (Benefit remix)	2014	Randal Kirk II
"Shut Us Down"	2016	Diego Contreras

== Awards and nominations ==
Year	Association	Award category	Result
2002	Oakland Raiderettes	Rookie of the Year	Won
2008	ALMA Award	Outstanding Female Performance	Nominated
