= Little Songs (Jon Guerra album) =

Studio album by Jon Guerra
- Released: April 21, 2015
- Genres: Contemporary Christian music, ambient, folk rock, worship
- Length: 46:21
- Label: Essential
- Producers: Jason Ingram, Jacob Sooter

Jon Guerra chronology
Glass – EP (2014)	Little Songs (2015)	Keeper of Days (2020)

Little Songs is the debut studio album by Jon Guerra. Essential Records released the album on April 21, 2015. Guerra worked with Jason Ingram and Jacob Sooter, in the production of this album.

== Critical reception ==
Professional ratings
Review scores
Source	Rating
365 Days of Inspiring Media	4/5 stars
CCM Magazine	3/5 stars
Christian Music Review	3.0/5
Cross Rhythms	10/10 squares
Worship Leader	4.5/5 stars

Signaling in a three star review by CCM Magazine, Grace S. Aspinwall recognizes, he "roars with his distinctive vocal (think Chris August with a hint of Ed Sheeran croon) on Little Songs. The introspective collection is faith-based, but also insightful with abstract ideas." Matt McChlery, specifying in a ten out of ten review for Cross Rhythms, Matt McChlery reports, "Jon is a Chicago-based singer/songwriter who has put together an outstanding collection of 11 songs with the potential to encourage and nourish ... Thoroughly recommended." Mentioning in a four and a half star review from Worship Leader, Kristen Gilles realizes, "Little Songs is a profound success in stirring the listener's heart to know, trust, celebrate and declare the goodness of God."

Joshua Andre, indicating in a four out of five star review from 365 Days of Inspiring Media, replies, "As Jon Guerra has executed his debut album exquisitely and almost flawlessly... With pristine voice reminding me of singer-songwriters such as Brenton Brown, Jason Castro, Charlie Hall and Jadon Lavik; Little Songs is sure to be treasured, appreciated and admired by many." Mentioning in a three out of five review for Christian Music Review, Laura McLean responds, "Little Songs is a great album that has good and positive vibes all the way through... The songs are very catchy with powerful lyrics and strong choruses."

== Track listing ==
Little Songs
No.	Title	Writer(s)	Length
1.	"Every Little Song"	Jon Guerra	2:51
2.	"Stained Glass"	Guerra, Jason Ingram, Matt Maher, Jacob Sooter	4:28
3.	"Nothing Better"	Guerra, Tyler Miller, Jonathan Smith	3:51
4.	"Wherever You Are"	Guerra	4:04
5.	"Ever Chasing God"	Guerra	5:08
6.	"Rolling, Rolling, Rolling"	Guerra	4:03
7.	"Speak"	Guerra, Ingram	4:44
8.	"Bound For Glory"	Hank Bentley, Guerra, Eddie Hoagland	3:39
9.	"The One We're Looking For"	Guerra, Ingram, Maher	4:47
10.	"I Will Follow"	Guerra, Sooter	4:17
11.	"Enough For Me"	Guerra, Ingram	4:29
Total length:			46:21

== Charts ==
Chart (2015)	Peak position
US Top Christian Albums (Billboard)	35
US Americana/Folk Albums (Billboard)	21
US Heatseekers Albums (Billboard)	17
