= Not for a Moment (After All) =

Single by Meredith Andrews

from the album Worth It All
- Released: July 31, 2012
- Genre: Christian Contemporary-Modern Worship
- Length: 4:00
- Label: Word
- Songwriter(s): Meredith Andrews; Mia Fieldes; Jacob Sooter

Meredith Andrews singles chronology
| "Can Anybody Hear Me" (2010) | "Not for a Moment (After All)" (2012) |

"Not for a Moment (After All)" is a song by Christian Contemporary-Modern Worship musician Meredith Andrews from her fourth studio album, Worth It All. It was released on July 31, 2012, as the first single from the album.

== Composition ==
"Not for a Moment (After All)" was written by Meredith Andrews, Mia Fieldes and Jacob Sooter.

== Release ==
"Not for a Moment (After All)" was digitally released as the lead single from Worth It All on July 31, 2012.

== Charts ==
| Chart (2012) | Peak position |
|---|---|
| US Christian AC (Billboard) | 10 |
| US Christian Airplay (Billboard) | 15 |
| US Christian Songs (Billboard) | 15 |
| US Christian AC Indicator (Billboard) | 13 |
| US Christian Soft AC (Billboard) | 4 |
