= Worth It All =

Studio album by Meredith Andrews
- Released: January 22, 2013
- Recorded: 2012
- Studio: Fireside Studio (Nashville, Tennessee)
- Genre: Contemporary worship music, contemporary Christian music
- Length: 49:33
- Label: Word
- Producer: Paul Mabury

Meredith Andrews chronology
| As Long as It Takes (2010) | Worth It All (2013) | Deeper (2016) |

Singles from Worth It All
- 1. "Not for a Moment (After All)" Released: July 31, 2012; 2. "Strong God" Released: October 31, 2013; 3. "Pieces" Released: October 10, 2013; 4. "Open Up the Heavens" Released: March 7, 2014

Worth It All is the fourth studio album by contemporary worship musician Meredith Andrews, released on January 22, 2013 by Word Records. "Not for a Moment (After All)" was released as the album's lead single on July 31, 2012. On February 9, 2013, the album peaked at number 144 on the Billboard 200 and number 7 on the Christian albums chart.

== Background ==
Meredith Andrews was interviewed by Caroline Lusk of CCM Magazine, in which she stated, "When we first started the record about two years ago, the direction we were going wasn't quite what I had in mind." She later stated, "We had four of five songs done, and after listening, I just had to be honest and say that it wasn't really where my heart was. I felt like I was writing songs to fill space." Andrews subsequently notified her record label that she would instead create a worship record, stating, "That's who I am."

== Response ==
=== Commercial ===
For the week of February 9, 2013, the album was the seventh most popular christian album by Billboard magazine chart, and it was the 144th most popular in the United States via the Billboard 200.

=== Critical ===
Professional ratings
Review scores
| Source | Rating |
|---|---|
| CCM Magazine | 4/5 stars |
| Christian Music Zine | (4.75/5) |
| Cross Rhythms | 10/10 squares |
| Indie Vision Music | 4/5 stars |
| Jesus Freak Hideout | 3.5/5 stars |
| Louder Than the Music | 4/5 stars |
| New Release Tuesday | 5/5 stars |
| Worship Leader | 4/5 stars |

Worth It All was received positively by critics. At CCM Magazine, Andy Argyrakis rated the album a 4 out of 5 stars. Christian Music Zine's Joshua Andre rated the album a 4.75 out of 5 stars. At Cross Rhythms, Tony Cummings rated the album a perfect ten-squares. Indie Vision Music's Jonathan Andre presented the album with a 4 out of 5 stars. Jesus Freak Hideout's Jen Rose imposed a rating of 3.5 out of 5 stars.

Louder Than the Music's Jono Davies imparted a 4 of 5 star rating on the album. New Release Tuesday's Kevin Davis rated it 5 of 5 stars, and compared Meredith Andrews to Christy Nockels, Brooke Fraser Ligertwood and Natalie Grant. Greg Wallace of Worship Leader rated the album 4 of 5 stars and noted the suitability of the songs for congregational worship. AllMusic's Heather Phares commented that the album "reflect[s] a subtlety and immediacy that make Andrews' approach to praise & worship unique."

== Track listing ==
Track listing
| No. | Title | Writer(s) | Length |
|---|---|---|---|
| 1. | "Open Up the Heavens" | Meredith Andrews, Stuart Garrard, Jason Ingram, James MacDonald, Andi Rozier | 3:53 |
| 2. | "Not for a Moment (After All)" | Andrews, Mia Fieldes, Jacob Sooter | 4:01 |
| 3. | "Strong God" | Andrews, Jon Egan, Ingram | 5:43 |
| 4. | "Start with Me" | Andrews, Paul Duncan, Paul Mabury | 3:57 |
| 5. | "Worth It All" | Ben Cantelon, Benji Cowart, Ingram, Jonathan Smith | 4:56 |
| 6. | "All I Ask" | Andrews, Fieldes | 4:18 |
| 7. | "Burn Away" | Andrews, B. Cowart, Jenna Cowart, Smith | 5:35 |
| 8. | "Your Kingdom Reigns" | Andrews, Ingram, Mabury | 4:35 |
| 9. | "Wonder of Wonders" | Andrews, Mabury, Matt Maher, Sooter | 4:31 |
| 10. | "The Gospel Changes Everything" | Andrews, B. Cowart, Mabury | 4:49 |
| 11. | "Pieces" | Andrews, Ben Glover | 3:15 |
| Total length: | | | 49:33 |

== Personnel ==
- Meredith Andrews – vocals, backing vocals
- Jacob Sooter – keyboards, acoustic piano, backing vocals
- Matt Stanfield – keyboards, acoustic piano
- Ben Glover – keyboards, programming, guitars
- Jonathan Smith – keyboards, programming, guitars, backing vocals
- Stu G – electric guitars
- Gabe Scott – acoustic guitars, slide guitar
- Mike Payne – electric guitars
- James Gregory – bass
- Tony Lucido – bass
- Paul Mabury – drums, programming, backing vocals
- Jocelyn Butler – cello
- Maria Caballero – viola
- Julia Ghica – violin
- Laura Kim – violin
- Becki Devries – backing vocals, session leader
- Devon Devries – backing vocals
- Kayla Erb – backing vocals
- Cody Fry – backing vocals
- Tyler Huston – backing vocals
- Carmen Justice – backing vocals
- Natalie McDonald – backing vocals
- Ariel McFall – backing vocals
- Chandler Roberts – backing vocals
- Matt Reed – backing vocals
- Jimmy Saiz – backing vocals
- Brady Troops – backing vocals

=== Production ===
- Anne Mabry – A&R
- Susan Riley – A&R
- Paul Mabury – producer
- Diane Sheets – vocal producer
- Dave Salley – engineer
- Sean Moffitt – mixing
- Warren David – mix assistant
- Jonathan Smith – editing
- Kevin Smith – vocal editing
- Cheryl McTyre – A&R administration
- Kortney Toney – administrative assistant
- Shane Tarleton – creative director
- Katherine Petillo – design
- Angela Talley – photography
- Amber Lehman – stylist
- Ashley Dye – hair stylist, make-up

== Charts ==
=== Album ===
| Chart (2013) | Peak position |
|---|---|
| US Billboard 200 | 144 |
| US Top Christian Albums (Billboard) | 7 |
