= Harvest Bible Chapel =

Church in Illinois, United States

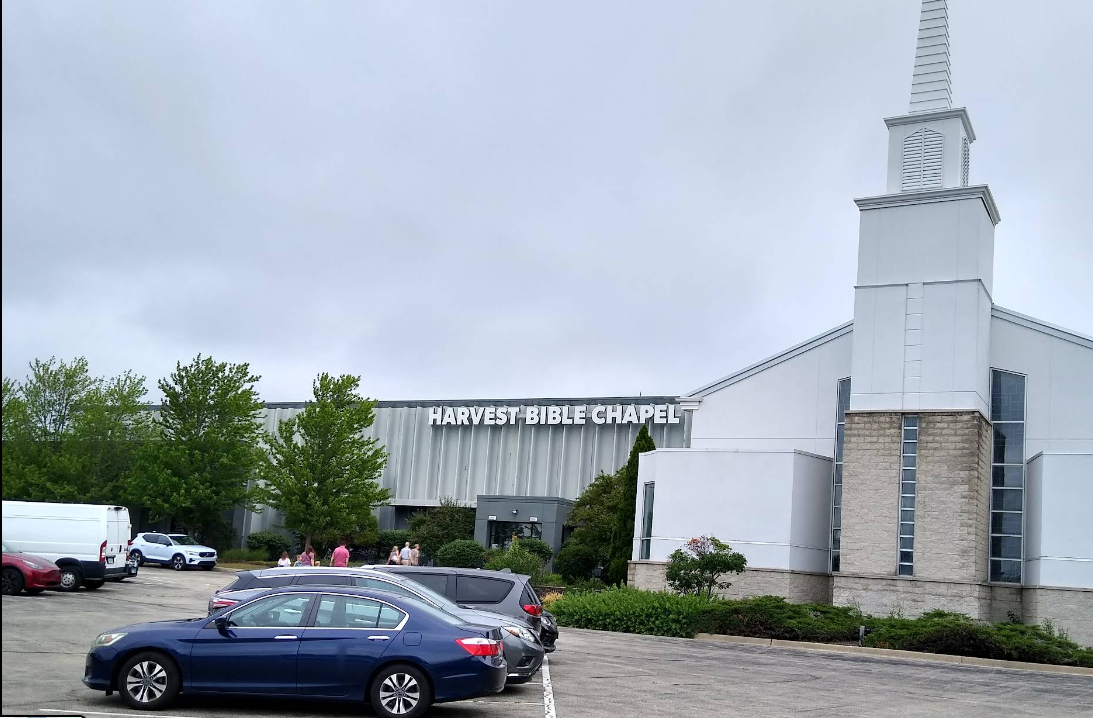
- Address: Illinois
- Country: United States
- Denomination: Nondenominational Christianity
- Website: harvestbible.org/campus

History
- Founded: 1988
- Founder: James MacDonald

Clergy
- Pastor(s): Dr. Jeff Bucknam, Lead Pastor of Teaching and Vision

Harvest Bible Chapel is an nondenominational megachurch in Rolling Meadows, Illinois, with another main campus in Elgin. Founded in 1988, it has grown to seven campuses in the Chicago metropolitan area. In 2008, the church was listed by Outreach magazine as one of the 100 fastest-growing churches in America. In January 2019, it was listed as one of the 50 largest churches in the United States. The church's current ministries include Vertical Worship and Harvest Christian Academy.

== History ==
Founded in 1988, by Canadian-born James MacDonald, Harvest Bible Chapel grew from a group of 18 people meeting in a local high school to a multi-site congregation of thousands. The church moved into a converted warehouse in Rolling Meadows, Illinois in 1995 and grew to include as many as 8 campuses; it added campuses in Elgin and Niles in 2004; Crystal Lake in 2007; downtown Chicago in 2009; Aurora in 2011; Deerfield Road in 2012; and Naples in 2018. The church's rapid growth led to its inclusion in Outreach Magazine's "Top 100 Fastest-Growing Churches in America" in 2008.

Pastor James MacDonald was fired in 2019 and came to a settlement with Harvest Bible Chapel to continue his ministry work independently in 2020.

On July 12, 2021, Dr. Jeff Bucknam became the Lead Pastor of Teaching and Vision. He previously served as the Lead Pastor of Northview Community Church in Abbotsford, BC, Canada.

In January 2026, the Chicago Cathedral Campus of Harvest Bible Chapel merged with Renewal Church of Chicago where Derrick Puckett serves as the Senior Pastor. Renewal Church partners with The Chicago Partnership and Pastor Derrick serves as president.

== Associated companies and organizations ==
=== Vertical Church Films ===
Vertical Church Films was launched in 2012 to produce Christian feature films. The ministry has produced three critically acclaimed short films, The Ride in 2012, Once We Were Slaves (retitled The Two Thieves) in 2014, and The Shepherd in 2017. Vertical Church Films' first feature film, The Resurrection of Gavin Stone, starring Brett Dalton, Anjelah Johnson, Shawn Michaels, Neil Flynn, and D. B. Sweeney was released in nearly 1000 theaters in the United States on January 20, 2017. As of 2021, VCF no longer makes films at Harvest Bible Chapel.

=== Camp Harvest ===
Camp Harvest is a camping facility located in Newaygo, Michigan owned and operated by Harvest Bible Chapel.

=== Harvest Christian Academy ===
River Valley Christian School is a preschool-12th grade school that launched in 2004 from the church.

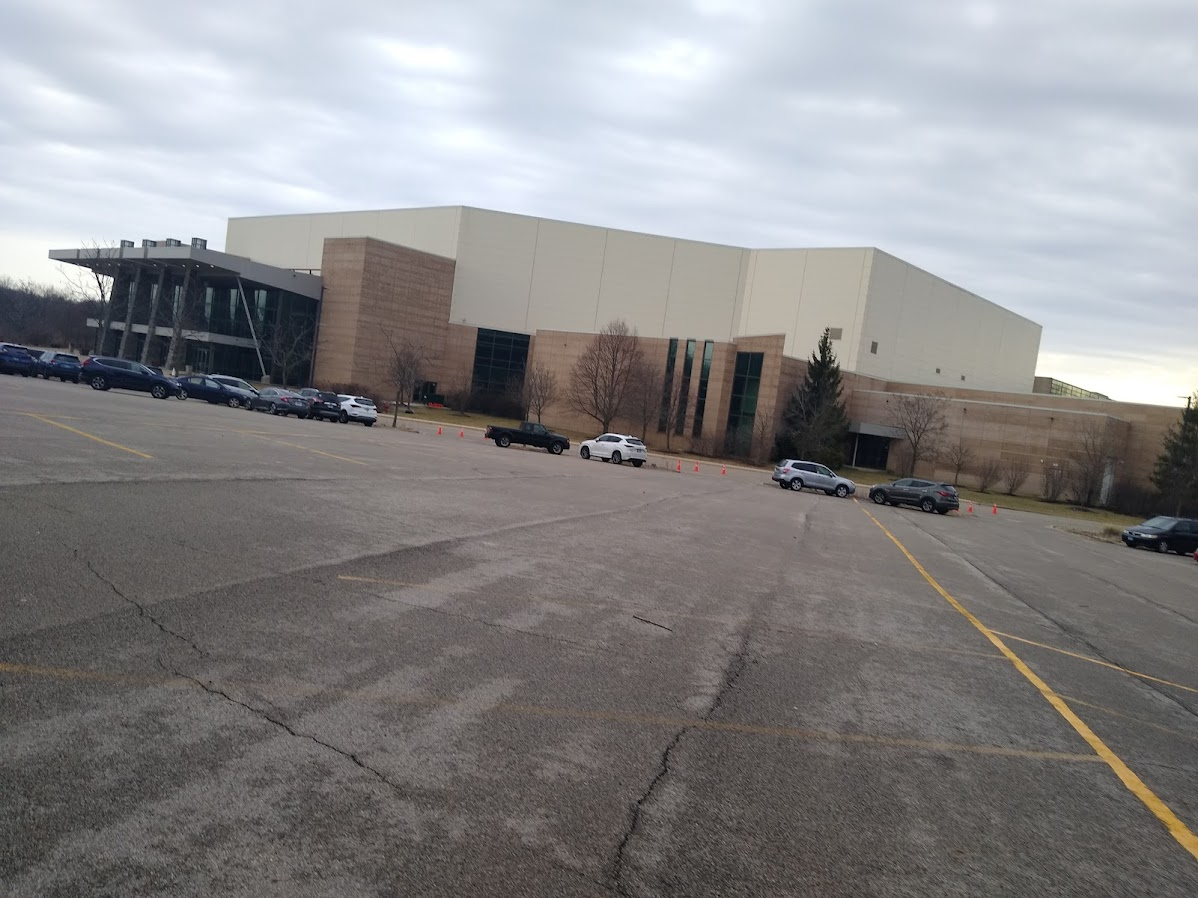
The Elgin campus and home of River Valley Christian School

=== Vertical Worship ===
The band Vertical Worship is connected to Harvest Bible Chapel.

=== Vertical Church Network ===
Harvest Bible Chapel launched the Vertical Church Network in 2002 under the name Harvest Bible Fellowship. It was a church planting ministry that planted over 200 churches across North America and other continents before eventually disbanding in 2017. Some of the churches affiliated with Harvest Bible Fellowship regrouped within the Great Commission Collective and Vertical Church Europe.

=== Walk in the Word ===
Launched in 1997, Walk in the Word became the radio outlet for MacDonald's teaching ministry at Harvest Bible Chapel. In 2012, the program received the "Billy Graham Award for Excellence in Christian Communication" from National Religious Broadcasters. In 2014, Walk in the Word expanded to global television and, in 2016, received the award for "Best Television Teaching Program". In February 2019, MacDonald announced that the show would no longer be broadcast on radio and television, but would be available in digital format on his website.

== Controversies ==
In October 2013, World reported: "As MacDonald and Harvest celebrate 25 years of ministry, they face a barrage of criticism from former elders, pastors, and staff who say the church leadership has operated in recent years with too little transparency and accountability". According to World, a group of former Harvest Bible Chapel elders had spoken out publicly about their concerns, alleging that the church had a "'puppet elder board'". After three elders resigned their positions, citing a "'culture of fear and intimidation'", Harvest publicly reprimanded two of the former elders and removed them from church membership. In September 2014, Harvest and MacDonald apologized for their actions toward the two former elders and lifted the church discipline against them.

In October 2018, Pastor James MacDonald and Harvest Bible Chapel sued two former members (Ryan Mahoney and Scott Bryant) and their wives, as well as journalist Julie Roys, for defamation. Mahoney and Bryant ran a website called The Elephant's Debt that had been publicly critical of MacDonald and Harvest. In December 2018, World Magazine published an exposé by Roys on the church and pastor, outlining an alleged history of financial mismanagement and authoritarian and abusive leadership by MacDonald. The church disputed these claims. On January 7, 2019, following a court decision denying the church's request to keep subpoenaed documents secret, the church sought to drop the lawsuit, saying that it had no legal means of protecting innocent third parties. McDonald took an "indefinite sabbatical from all preaching and leadership" on January 16, 2019. On January 25, Chicago radio personality Mancow Muller, who described himself as a Harvest attender and a friend of MacDonald, publicly criticized McDonald's leadership, called for the elders of Harvest Bible Chapel to be removed, urged church members to stop making financial contributions until needed changes were made, and asserted that an outside group should be brought in to lead the church.

On February 12, 2019, James MacDonald was fired from Harvest Bible Chapel after recordings were released of MacDonald making inappropriate comments. In the recordings, obtained by Mancow and aired on his February 12 show, MacDonald joked about orchestrating a plot to blackmail Harold Smith, the CEO of Christianity Today magazine, by planting illegal child pornography on Smith's computer. This move came after years of reports from former elders, pastors, and staffers accusing him and the church of financial mismanagement and other improprieties. On February 19, the church's executive committee resigned and announced other planned structural and financial changes to the church. Later that month, MacDonald's two sons resigned from positions at the church, and in March its Assistant Senior Pastor also resigned after the Evangelical Council for Financial Accountability suspended its accreditation of the church. Further reporting by Julie Roys showed that MacDonald had used church funds to purchase a vintage 1971 VW Beetle (valued at $13,000) for Ed Stetzer (contributing editor at Christianity Today) and Harley-Davidson motorcycles for several other Harvest members.

On April 30, 2019, the outgoing elders of Harvest Bible Chapel issued an apology for filing the 2018 lawsuit. The apology asserted that even if the lawsuit may have been "lawful," it was "a sinful violation of 1 Corinthians 6", and therefore it "biblically should not have been pursued."
