= As Long as It Takes =

Studio album by Meredith Andrews
- Released: March 2, 2010
- Genres: Contemporary Christian, worship, Christian rock
- Length: 47:02
- Label: Word
- Producer: Jason Ingram: Rusty Varenkamp

Meredith Andrews chronology
| The Invitation (2008) | As Long as It Takes (2010) | Worth It All (2013) |

Professional ratings
Review scores
| Source | Rating |
|---|---|
| Christian Music Zine | B− |
| Jesus Freak Hideout | 3/5 stars |

As Long as It Takes is the third studio album released by Christian singer Meredith Andrews.

== Track listing ==
All songs were co-written by Andrews; additional writers are listed below.

| No. | Title | Writer(s) | Length |
|---|---|---|---|
| 1. | "Never Move On" | Matt Bronleewe, Jason Ingram | 3:25 |
| 2. | "Only to Be Yours" | Ingram | 4:10 |
| 3. | "Can Anybody Hear Me" | Ingram | 4:12 |
| 4. | "As Long as It Takes" | Ingram | 3:16 |
| 5. | "Come Home" | Ingram | 4:12 |
| 6. | "All Will Fade Away" | Ingram, Jacob Sooter | 5:22 |
| 7. | "What It Means to Love" | Jason Walker | 4:03 |
| 8. | "Live Through Me" | Bronleewe, Ingram | 3:19 |
| 9. | "My Soul Sings" | Stu Gerrard, Ingram | 4:20 |
| 10. | "In Your Arms" (featuring Jared Anderson) | Jared Anderson | 4:31 |
| 11. | "How Great Is the Love" (featuring Paul Baloche) | Paul Baloche, Sooter | 6:16 |
| Total length: | | | 47:02 |

== Personnel ==
- Meredith Andrews – vocals, backing vocals
- Jacob Sooter – acoustic piano, keyboards
- Scotty Murray – electric guitars
- Mike Payne – acoustic guitars, electric guitars
- Tony Lucido – bass
- Paul Mabury – drums
- Chris Carmichael – strings
- Jason Ingram – backing vocals
- Jared Anderson – backing vocals (10)
- Paul Baloche – vocals (11)

=== Production ===
- Jason Jenkins – A&R
- Jamie Kiner – A&R
- Jason Ingram – producer
- Rusty Varenkamp – producer, engineer, piano engineer, editing
- D. Thomas Toner – editing
- Bill Deaton – mixing
- Andrew Mendelson – mastering at Georgetown Masters (Nashville, Tennessee)
- Natthaphol Abhigantaphand– mastering assistant
- Shelley Anderson – mastering assistant
- Daniel Bacigalupi – mastering assistant
- Crystal Varenkamp – production assistant

== Awards ==
The album won a Dove Award for Praise & Worship Album of the Year at the 42nd GMA Dove Awards, while the song "How Great Is the Love" also won for Worship Song of the Year.
