= Mancow Muller =

American radio host (born 1966)

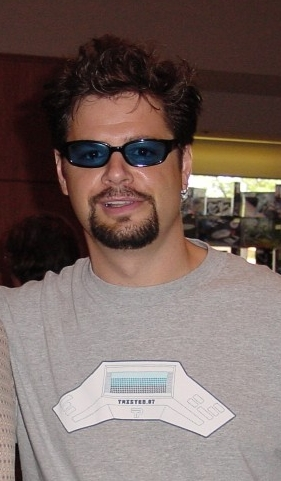
- Muller in 2000
- Born: Matthew Erich Muller; June 21, 1966 (age 60); Kansas City, Missouri, U.S.
- Other name: Mancow
- Occupations: Radio and television personality, actor
- Presenting career
- Show: Mancow's Morning Madhouse
- Style: Talk, politics, entertainment
- Country: United States

Matthew Erich "Mancow" Muller (born June 21, 1966) is an American radio and television personality, actor, and former child actor. Considered a shock jock, his career has been well known for controversy and clashes with the Federal Communications Commission. He is best known for Mancow's Morning Madhouse, a Chicago-based syndicated radio show, and The Mancow Radio Experience, which have been nationally distributed by Talk Radio Network. Muller also co-starred with his brother, Mark, in the reality TV series God, Guns & Automobiles, which aired on History Channel. He was the host of the morning show on WLUP-FM/97.9, before he was let go on March 6, 2018, upon WLUP-FM/97.9 being sold.

In January 2019, Muller returned to radio on WLS to host mornings, but has since been replaced.

== Early life ==
Erich Muller, as he was commonly known, was born to parents John and Dawn Muller and raised in the Kansas City, Missouri area with older brothers Johnny and Mark. He expressed an interest in radio and the entertainment industry as a whole from an early age. As a child he would listen to old reel-to-reel tapes of classic radio shows like The Shadow and The Stan Freberg Show with his father. Erich Muller worked as a model and child actor, appearing in regional print and television commercials as well as Kansas City theater productions. Among his print modeling work were ads for Lee jeans and Wal-Mart.

As a youth he appeared in over 100 stage performances, with one notable long-running role being that of Billy Ray Jr. in the play On Golden Pond. During one performance of the play, famous actor Henry Fonda was in the audience, and would later go on to play the lead character Norman in the film version. Erich Muller attended multiple schools in the Kansas City area, including Blue Ridge Christian School. In his book Dad, Dames, Demons, and a Dwarf: My Trip Down Freedom Road, he recounts an incident in fifth grade where, in an act of corporal punishment, he was severely beaten with a board by the school principal, an event that changed his outlook on organized religion. Muller transferred to the suburban Harrisonville school district, where he was graduated from high school.

Following high school, Muller attended college at Central Missouri State University (now University of Central Missouri) in Warrensburg, not far from the Kansas City metropolitan area. At CMSU he continued to work in theater, and it was his role as a half-man, half-beast in one production that gave rise to his nickname "Mancow". Muller earned double degrees from the university in Public Relations and Theatre in 1990. To earn money while in school, he operated his own mobile DJ business, providing music for school dances, weddings, and class reunions, a job he later said he hated. It was also while in college he took his first tentative steps into broadcasting.

== Radio career ==
Muller's radio career began while he was in college. He got a job at KOKO in Warrensburg as a late night control board operator, playing local commercials during satellite broadcasts of The Larry King Show. His role at the station gradually expanded until he got his own afternoon show. Among Muller's fans was the general manager of KLSI-FM, Kansas City, who offered him a full-time job as head of station promotions. Muller accepted the position, plus a weekend air shift, while completing his final semester at Central Missouri State. After graduating in 1990, Muller was hired as the morning drive air talent at Kansas City's KBEQ-FM, Q-104, where the Holy Moley & Maxx Show quickly rose to #1 in the ratings and helped Q-104 dominate the market.

After his early hometown success, Muller left Kansas City for a brief stint at KDON-FM in Salinas, California. Then he headed north to San Francisco and KYLD-FM, "Wild 107". Now going by his old college nickname Mancow, in 1993 Muller made national headlines with a publicity stunt that caused a major traffic problem for San Francisco. Reacting to a subsequently debunked story that President Bill Clinton had tied up air traffic at Los Angeles International Airport for over an hour while getting a haircut from celebrity hairstylist Cristophe aboard Air Force One, Muller staged a parody of the incident on the San Francisco–Oakland Bay Bridge during rush hour. He used vans to block the westbound lanes on the bridge while his then-sidekick, Jesus "Chuy" Gomez, received a haircut. As a result of the publicity stunt, Muller was charged with creating a public nuisance. After entering a no contest plea, his sentence included three years probation, a $500 fine and 100 hours of community service. The radio station settled a civil suit by paying $1.5 million, including $500,000 to cover three toll-free days on the bridge.

=== Mancow's Morning Madhouse ===
Muller accepted a job offer by Evergreen Media President Jim de Castro at more than double his salary to move to Chicago and work at "Rock 103.5" (WRCX). Muller's radio show, Mancow's Morning Madhouse, debuted in July 1994.

Originally, Muller broadcast from WRCX-FM (Rock 103.5) studios in the John Hancock Center and in 1998, moved to the city's alternative rock station, WKQX-FM (Q-101) 101.1, where the show was broadcast from the Merchandise Mart for eight more years.

Within two Arbitron ratings periods Muller took the station's 19th-ranked morning show to 5th-ranked among all teens and adults, and first among 18- to 34-year-olds. During his run on Q101, Mancow had a much publicized feud with fellow "shock-jock" Howard Stern. He also had close on and off air relationships with "Crazy Howard" McGee of WGCI-FM and Mike North of WSCR. McGee and Mancow's shows ran at the same time but catered to different demographics (WGCI is an R&B and hip hop station).

Muller's Mancow's Morning Madhouse ended its live run on Emmis' Alternative outlet in Spring 2006, and had the highest rated audience in Chicago with men ages 25 to 54 (among English speaking stations). According to the Arbitron radio ratings service, Mancow's show, measured in Average Quarter Hour listening percentages (AQH) had a 5.7 share. The next closest station was all-news WBBM with a 5.3 share.

In his target demographic, men between the ages of 18 and 34 years, Mancow AQH was an 11.8 share of the audience in that age group, the highest share of any other Anglophonic station in Chicago.

His show, however, was not without controversy. In 1999, Janet Dahl, the wife of Chicago talk radio host Steve Dahl, filed a multimillion-dollar defamation lawsuit against Muller over lewd comments Muller made about her on his show. In 2001, the case was settled out of court. Although the terms of the deal were not disclosed, it reportedly reached seven figures.

Between 1999 and 2004, David Edward Smith's Citizens for Community Values filed 66 indecency complaints with the FCC relating to Muller's program, leading to 6 citations and $42,000 in fines. In 2004 Muller sued Smith for harassment and business interference, but later dropped the lawsuit. Emmis Communications entered into a 2004 consent decree with the FCC, agreeing to make a $300,000 "voluntary payment" to resolve the complaints; in 2006 (after Muller had ended his WKQX show), the FCC rejected Smith's challenge to this settlement.

For a full week leading up to Limp Bizkit's Summer Sanitarium 2003 concert in Chicago, Muller continually mocked the band's vocalist Fred Durst on his radio show and invited listeners to attend the concert with anti-Durst placards. When Muller's fans complied by showing up with the placards, openly taunting the singer, booing him and pelting him with refuse, Durst erupted into a profanity-laced homophobic tirade and left the stage only 17 minutes into the show. Durst was eventually sued for breach of contract (for not completing the show) by Chicago lawyer Michael Young in a class-action suit.

On October 22, 2008, WLS in Chicago announced that Muller, along with Pat Cassidy, would join that station as a weekday radio talk show host, in the 9 am to 11 am time slot, beginning on October 27, 2008. Muller continued to host his nationally syndicated morning radio program. Just four months after the debut of Mancow and Cassidy, Arbitron ratings had the show at No. 1 in the 12+ audience, and nearly doubling Chicago competitors in the male demographic as of February 2009. Despite the ratings, Muller was fired from his job on news and conservative talk station WLS after only 16 months. Muller then hosted a Sunday night show on WABC from September 2010 until October 2011, when he was let go following Cumulus Media's acquisition of WABC parent Citadel Broadcasting.

On October 22, 2012, Muller began his new show, simply titled Mancow, on WPWR-TV, a live broadcast of his radio show The Mancow Experience, with co-host Teresa Cesario. In February 2013, a program called The Mancow Mashup began airing on the network, which was a half-hour program that showed highlights from the previous morning's Television show. The show's last airing was October 7, 2014. On October 9, 2014, roughly a year from when the show began airing, Muller's WPWR-TV simulcast of his radio show was confirmed cancelled after the show's contract expired, along with The Mancow Mashup. Muller confirmed that for the first time since 1985, he will be taking a break from both TV and radio. However, Muller mentioned the possibility of other ventures, including a potential movie review show.

Muller returned to the radio on Chicago's WLUP-FM radio station in February 2015 after winning a week-long audition for the station's 6–10 am weekday show. Muller's show on WLUP ended on 6 March 2018 when it was announced that WLUP had been sold to Christian radio broadcaster Educational Media Foundation.

=== WLS ===
On January 3, 2019, Muller returned to WLS in Chicago after nine months off the air. Muller said his new show will focus more on news, entertainment and politics compared to his time on The Loop.

Mancow announced he is leaving his show, on November 25, 2020.

== Cowboy Ray ==
Ray Hofstatter, a.k.a. "Cowboy Ray", was a mentally challenged frequent caller and guest on Mancow's Morning Madhouse. On November 20, 2005, Hofstatter was struck by a car in a hit-and-run accident and critically injured. Hofstatter died shortly after his life support was terminated on January 11, 2006. He was 45. Muller offered a $13,000 reward for information leading to the arrest of the driver, but was unsuccessful. The hit-and-run case of Cowboy Ray was featured on the February 26, 2006 episode of Fox's America's Most Wanted.

== Politics ==
Mancow was an outspoken supporter of George W. Bush during the 2000 presidential election, asking people on the street whether they "liked [George W.] Bush or liked Dick [Cheney]." On December 6, 2005, Muller made an appearance on Fox News Channel's Fox & Friends where he referred to Democratic National Committee chairman Howard Dean as "vile", "bloodthirsty" and "evil". Muller also commented on Dean's negative opinions on the War in Iraq, calling Dean a traitor who "ought to be kicked out of America" and "tried for treason".

== Waterboarding ==
On May 22, 2009, Muller had himself waterboarded during his radio program on WLS, having lost a listener poll determining whether he or co-host Pat Cassidy would be the one waterboarded. The talk show host had previously claimed that calling waterboarding "torture" was wrong, something he had stated that he hoped his reenactment would prove. Lasting only 6 seconds ("8 seconds less than the average person", according to program guest Marine Sergeant Klay South, who was the one to administer the waterboarding), Mancow afterward changed his opinion, saying, "It is way worse than I thought it would be, and that's no joke", and described waterboarding as "absolutely torture".

Questions were later raised about the validity of the procedure. South had no formal training in waterboarding and had never before performed the procedure, leading the online celebrity and gossip site Gawker to accuse Muller of faking the whole thing. Muller later stated in an interview on Countdown with Keith Olbermann, "I admit it, it was a stupid radio stunt. But waterboarding, all it is, is water in your nose and mouth with your head back." Further adding "We went into this thinking it was going to be a joke. But it was not a joke – it was horrible. 'Hoax' is probably not the right word, but we did think it was going to be a joke."

== Personal life ==
Muller married Sandy Ferrando, a former publicist, on February 14, 2003. He has twin daughters named Ava Grace and Isabella Sofia. His father, a former traveling salesman, died of cancer at the age of 62. The event deeply affected Muller and in part prompted him to write his first book, Dad, Dames, Demons and a Dwarf. Mancow Muller attended Harvest Bible Chapel from 2014 to 2019 and was a personal friend of pastor James MacDonald since 2016. In November 2018 Muller travelled to Israel with MacDonald where the pastor baptized him in the Jordan River. Less than two months later in January 2019 and less than three weeks after starting his new radio show on WLS-Chicago, Mancow began calling MacDonald a con artist on his show and on social media sites, and asking him to resign or be removed as pastor. Mancow has consistently criticized and accused MacDonald of crimes since January 2019, including murder-for-hire in May 2019.

== Filmography ==
=== Television/movies ===
Title	Role	Episode	Additional notes
Night Stand	Himself	"Eurotrash"	1996 episode
Party of Five	Bartender	"Fragile"	1999 episode
Early Edition	Randy, Car Salesman	"Home Groan"	1999 episode
The Shield	Arrestee	"Hurt"	2005 episode
Sons Of Anarchy	Nomad	"Na Triobloidi"	2009 episode
The Chicago Code	Himself (voice)	"Cabrini Green"	2011 episode
The Chicago Code	Himself (voice)	"Wild Onions"	2011 episode
The Chicago Code	Himself	"St. Valentine's Day Massacre"	2011 episode
God, Guns & Automobiles	Himself		2013 episode
Criminal Minds	DJ	"'Til Death Do Us Part"	2015 episode
Death Wish	Himself		2018 movie
At the Park By the Creek	Himself		2019 movie

== See also ==
- Mancow's Morning Madhouse
