= Mesmerized (Meredith Andrews album) =

Studio album by Meredith Andrews
- Released: April 12, 2005
- Genres: Contemporary Christian, worship
- Length: 45:20
- Label: Chrematizo

Meredith Andrews chronology
Mesmerized (2005)	The Invitation (2008)

Professional ratings
Review scores
Source	Rating
Jesus Freak Hideout	3/5 stars

Mesmerized is the first studio album released by Christian singer Meredith Andrews.

== Track listing ==
All songs written by Meredith Andrews.

No.	Title	Length
1.	"As Worship to You" (Instrumental)	1:00
2.	"Highest Praise"	4:33
3.	"For Your Glory"	3:37
4.	"I Surrender It All"	4:55
5.	"Satisfied"	4:06
6.	"We Praise Your Holy Name"	4:06
7.	"More of You"	3:37
8.	"Over Me"	5:18
9.	"All the Way"	3:42
10.	"Speak to Me"	3:12
11.	"Holy Is the Lord"	4:47
12.	"As Worship to You"	2:23
