= Jon Guerra =

- Born: Jonathan Allen Guerra; Whittier, California
- Origin: Chicago, Illinois
- Genres: Christian devotional music, baroque pop, worship
- Occupations: Singer, songwriter
- Instruments: Vocals, guitar, piano
- Years active: 2011–present
- Labels: Descendant, Essential
- Website: jonguerramusic.com

Jonathan Allen Guerra is an American devotional music singer-songwriter. His first record label release was an extended play, Glass, released in 2014 by Essential Records (Sony). His first record label studio album, Little Songs, was released in 2015 through Essential Records. His studio albums of devotional music include Keeper of Days (2020), Ordinary Ways (2023), and Jesus (2025). He has also recorded for film, including Terrence Malick's A Hidden Life (2019).

== Early life ==
Guerra was born Jonathan Allen Guerra, in Whittier, California in September 1985. Guerra's father is Alberto Guerra and mother is Monica Guerra (née, Barrionuevo), who were married in 1980 in Harris County, Texas in the City of Houston. His parents moved to the Los Angeles area in California, where Jon was born. After Jon's birth, they moved to Houston, where he grew up until he was twelve years old. His parents then settled in Wheaton, Illinois. Jon then moved to Chicago, Illinois.

== Music career ==
His music career began when Guerra was in high school. After college, he started a Chicago-based band called Milano, a "gypsy prog-rock" indie group with co-members Valerie Strattan Guerra, Steve Enison, Justin Ferwerda, Hans Moscicke, and Alissa Strattan, which broke up in 2013 after having created three studio albums (several singles of which were remixed by EMD artist Hanzel). Guerra continued writing, recording, and playing both independent and commercial music, and in 2011, Guerra began releasing a series of Christmas songs with his wife. Guerra would also release an independent project in 2013 under the moniker JAGUERRA, an album called Hue which was released as an early Vinyl Me Please] subscription selection.

Guerra's next releases would be under Essential Records that, at the time, had a distribution deal with Sony Music. First, a quiet release of an extended play, Working Demos, that found an audience on NoiseTrade. Next was Jon Guerra's debut extended play, Glass, released on June 3, 2014. This would be the precursor to his first major label album, released on April 21, 2015, Little Songs, with Essential Records (Sony). Little Songs was Jon Guerra's breakthrough release on the Billboard magazine charts, peaking on the Heatseekers chart at No. 17, placing at No. 24 on the Folk Albums chart, and placing on Christian Albums at No. 35.

Jon Guerra and his wife, Valerie, released their first Christmas album, It's Almost Christmas (Jon & Valerie Guerra) in 2015, with Sony's Descendant Records and toured with Amy Grant and Vince Gill's Christmas at the Ryman in 2015 and 2016. In 2017, Jon & Valerie started their official musical duo, Praytell, and they released a handful of singles as well as another Christmas album, It's Almost Christmas, Vol. 2, in 2018. Guerra released Working Demos 2 EP in 2017.

In April 2020, Guerra released his second album of devotional music, Keeper of Days. Reviews of the album say that Keeper of Days "is one of the best Christian records I've heard in years". Guerra self-produced the album, with strings by his wife, Valerie Strattan Guerra. Guerra describes his "devotional music" as "less Sunday morning worship music and more Monday morning prayer music."

In May 2023, Guerra released his third devotional music album, Ordinary Ways, to widespread critical acclaim. Reviews of Ordinary Ways say it is "absolutely timeless," "Listening to this album feels like praying," and "The psalm-like sonic prayers of Ordinary Ways are an extraordinary gift." Guerra again self-produced his album, with his long-time musical collaborator, his wife, Valerie, on strings. He "continues to be a voice in modern CCM worth listening to."

His latest album is Jesus, released in April 2025. Jon describes the album as "a portrait of love, of Christ". In his article for The Gospel Coalition, Brett McCracken described the album as "soul-nourishing and faith-enriching" and "Christian music that deserves the largest possible audience."

He also composed additional music for Terrence Malick's A Hidden Life (2019).

== Personal life ==
Guerra is married to Valerie Strattan Guerra, and together they reside and make music in Austin, Texas.

== Discography ==
=== Studio albums ===
List of studio albums, with selected chart positions
Title	Album details	Peak chart positions		
Title	Album details	US Christ	US Folk	US Heat
Little Songs	Released: April 21, 2015; Label: Essential; CD, digital download, LP, streaming	35	21	17
Keeper of Days	Released: April 24, 2020; Label: Thorndale Records; CD, digital download, LP, streaming	—	—	—
Ordinary Ways	Released: May 12, 2023; Label: Thorndale Records; CD, digital download, LP, streaming	—	—	—
Jesus	Released: April 4, 2025; Label: Thorndale Records; CD, digital download, LP, streaming	—	—	—
