= Meredith Andrews =

American contemporary Christian singer-songwriter

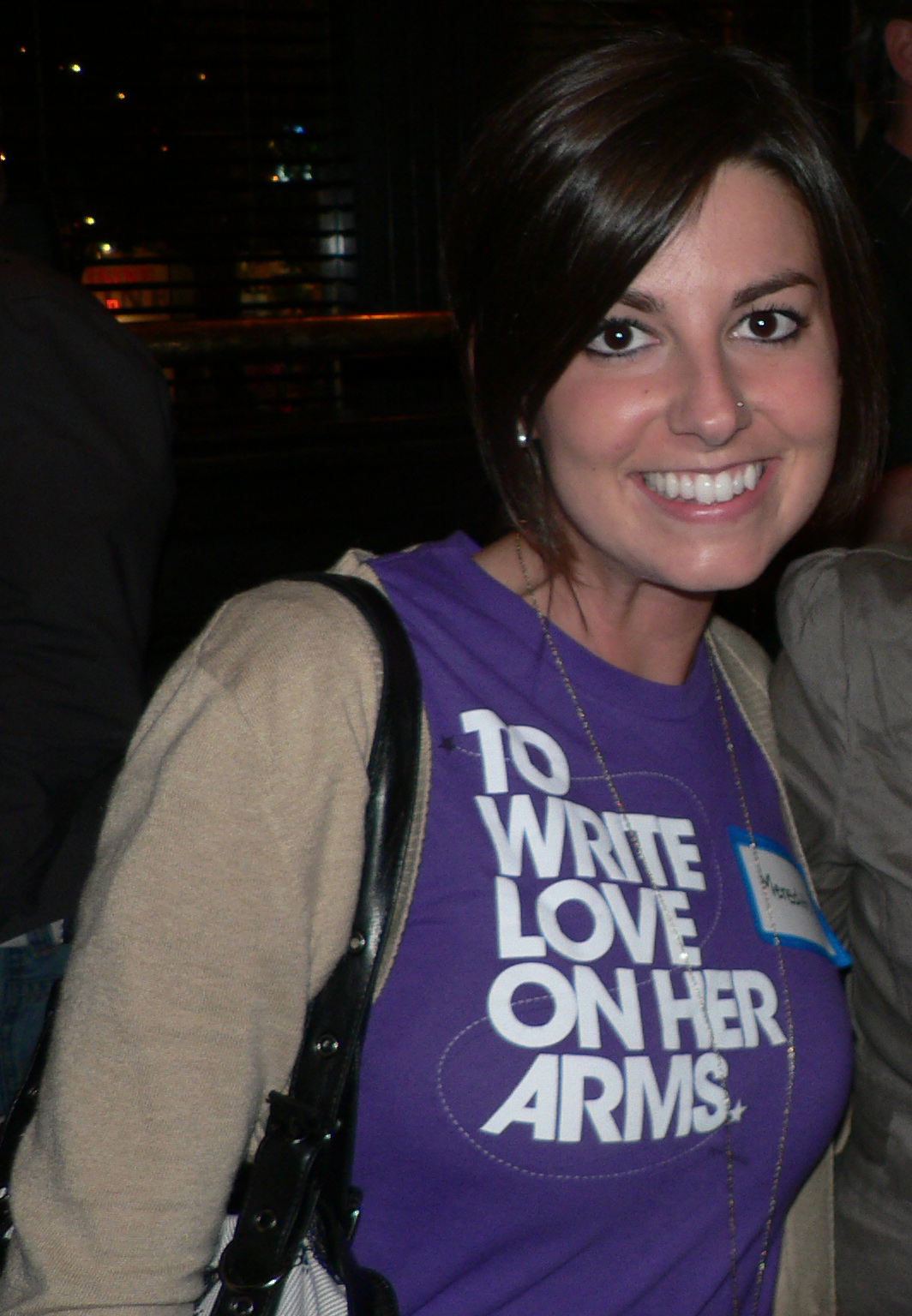
- Andrews in 2008

Background information
- Born: Meredith Frances Andrews; January 19, 1983 (age 43); Wilson, North Carolina, U.S.
- Genres: CCM
- Years active: 2005–present
- Label: Curb
- Spouse: Jacob Sooter (m. 2008)
- Website: meredithandrews.com

Meredith Frances Sooter (born January 19, 1983), known professionally as Meredith Andrews, is a contemporary Christian music artist, songwriter and worship leader. She has won two Dove Awards.

== Biography ==
Andrews grew up in Wilson, North Carolina, where she started singing when she was six years old. She attended Wilson Christian Academy, where she graduated. Andrews later attended college at Liberty University in Virginia. Though she was born an only child, her parents served as foster parents to many children while she was growing up, three of whom later were adopted by her parents.

In 2011, Andrews won two Dove Awards: the Worship Song of the Year award for "How Great Is the Love" from As Long As It Takes and Praise And Worship Album of the Year for the same album. On July 31, 2012, Andrews released a new single "Not for a Moment (After All)".

Before taking off as a solo artist, Andrews was a worship leader with Vertical Worship at Harvest Bible Chapel in Chicago.

In 2016, she released her album Deeper.

In 2021, she released Ábrenos los Cielos ("Open Up the Heavens"), her first Spanish album with participation of Lucía Parker, Seth Condrey, Blanca, and others.

On March 22, 2024, Andrews released a live album titled Heaven's Frequency, which was recorded in Nashville, Tennessee, and was published through Curb Records.

== Personal life ==
She is married to producer Jacob Sooter, whom she met at an event organised by the GMA. They wed on May 23, 2008 and together they have three children.

== Discography ==
- Mesmerized (2005)
- The Invitation (2008)
- As Long as It Takes (2010)
- Worth It All (2013)
- Deeper (2016)
- Receive Our King (2017)
- Ábrenos Los Cielos (2021)
- Heaven's Frequency (Live) (2024)

== Tours ==
Andrews toured with Pocket Full of Rocks and Todd Agnew.
