= Cono Christian School =

Coordinates: 42.317°N 91.775°W

- Walker, Iowa; United States

Information
- Type: Private Christian school
- Established: 1951

Cono Christian School is a private Christian school currently serving day students. It was originally founded in 1951 near Walker, Iowa, by leaders of a local Presbyterian church, notably Max and Jean Belz and LeRoy Gardner. It has served K-12 day and boarding students from around the United States and the world. Boarding students, who were generally in middle and high school, began attending in 1960, though the school currently does not board students.

In 2017 the 192-acre property and facility began use as a camp and retreat center of Ridge Haven, the camp and conference center of the Presbyterian Church in America. Summer camps started in 2018, and the school was re-opened in 2021 after a short closure.

This Christian day and boarding school began as a ministry of Bible Presbyterian Church (PCA). Max Belz was the pastor of the church at the time of the school's founding. He, Jean, and their eight children lived on the 1-acre (4,000 m^{2}) of donated property where the church building was built. Today Cono has 192 acres (0.78 km^{2}), 25 of which are developed with academic, athletic and student and staff residential facilities.
