= Bebo Norman discography =

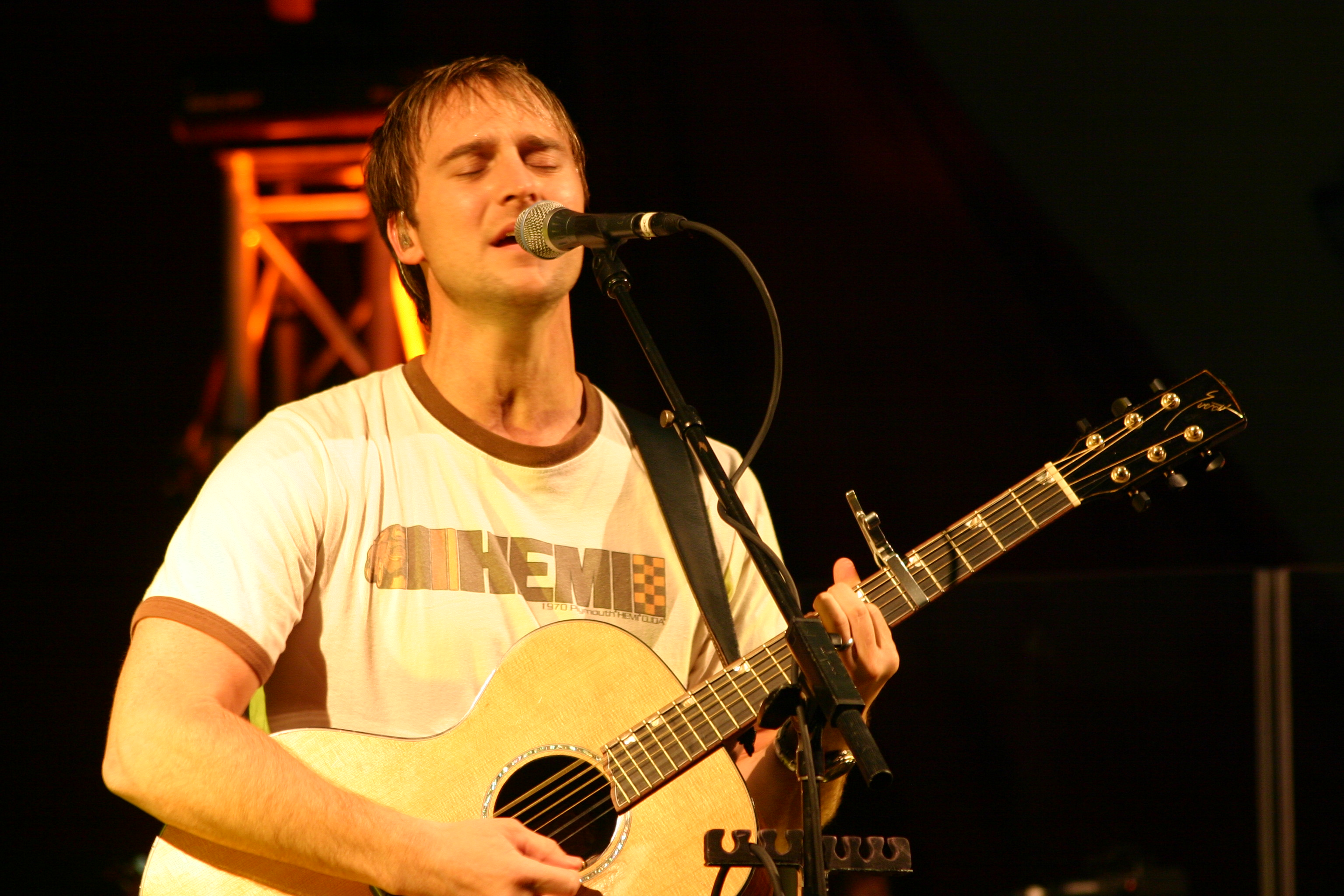
- Studio albums: 8
- Compilation albums: 1
- Singles: 22
- Other album appearances: 29

The Bebo Norman discography is about the works of contemporary Christian musician Bebo Norman.

== Discography ==
=== Independent albums ===
- The Fabric of Verse (1996) - Independent

=== Studio albums ===
List of studio albums, with selected chart positions and certifications
Title	Album details	Peak chart positions			
Title	Album details	US 200	US Christian	US Heatseekers	US Internet
Ten Thousand Days	Released: September 14, 1999; Label: Watershed; Format: CD, digital download	—	11	27	3
Big Blue Sky	Released: May 15, 2001; Label: Essential; Format: CD, digital download	141	8	4	5
Myself When I Am Real	Released: September 10, 2002; Label: Essential; Format: CD, digital download	114	7	1	8
Try	Released: August 24, 2004; Label: Essential; Format: CD, digital download	159	7	9	—
Between the Dreaming and the Coming True	Released: September 19, 2006; Label: Essential; Format: CD, digital download	185	12	6	—
Bebo Norman	Released: September 16, 2008; Label: BEC; Format: CD, digital download	—	13	—	—
Ocean	Released: September 28, 2010; Label: BEC; Format: CD, digital download	184	15	—	—
Lights of Distant Cities	Released: October 23, 2012; Label: BEC; Format: CD, digital download	—	18	—	—
"—" denotes that a release that did not chart

=== Compilation albums ===
List of compilation albums, with selected chart positions and certifications
Title	Album details
Great Light of the World: The Best of Bebo Norman	Released: September 25, 2007; Label: Essential; Format: CD, digital download

=== Holiday albums ===
List of holiday albums, with selected chart positions and certifications
Title	Album details	Peak chart positions	
Title	Album details	US Christian	US Holiday
Christmas... From the Realms of Glory	Released: October 7, 2007; Label: BEC; Format: CD, digital download	35	5

== Singles ==
List of singles, with selected chart positions
Title	Year	Peak chart positions					Album
Title	Year	US Christian Songs	US Christian AC	US Soft/AC Inspo	US Christian AC Ind	US Christian CHR	Album
"Holy Is Your Name" (with Cliff & Danielle Young)	2003	29	33	—	—	—	City on a Hill: Sing Alleluia
"Great Light of the World"	2003	3	2	1	1	3	Myself When I Am Real
"Falling Down"	2003	18	18	—	—	—	Myself When I Am Real
"Yes I Will" (featuring Joy Williams)	2004	18	18	—	—	—	Try
"Disappear"	2005	21	22	5	—	—	Try
"Nothing Without You"	2005	2	3	1	—	—	Try
"Borrow Mine"	2005	30	31	1	—	—	Try
"Sometimes by Step" (with Rich Mullins)	2006	16	14	5	—	—	Great Light of the World: The Best of Bebo Norman
"I Will Lift My Eyes"	2006	6	5	4	—	—	Between the Dreaming and the Coming True
"Into the Day"	2007	26	19	16	—	—	Between the Dreaming and the Coming True
"Go Tell It on the Mountain"	2008	—	25	—	—	—	Christmas... From the Realms of Glory
"What Child Is This"	2008	—	28	—	—	—	Christmas... From the Realms of Glory
"Come and Worship"	2008	—	27	18	—	—	Christmas... From the Realms of Glory
"Joy to the World"	2008	—	30	—	—	—	Christmas... From the Realms of Glory
"Christmas Time Is Here"	2008	—	23	—	—	—	Christmas... From the Realms of Glory
"Britney"	2008	—	23	18	—	—	Bebo Norman
"Pull Me Out"	2008	20	22	18	—	4	Bebo Norman
"Never Saw You Coming"	2010	30	22	—	17	—	Bebo Norman
"Here It From Me"	2010	—	—	17	—	—	Bebo Norman
"Here Goes"	2010	28	20	8	14	28	Ocean
"God of My Everything"	2011	—	—	3	—	—	Ocean
"I Hope You See Jesus"	2011	—	—	1	—	—	Ocean
"The Broken"	2012	—	—	16	—	—	Lights of Distant Cities

== Other album appearances ==
This is the list of his other album appearances.

1. Seasons of Reflection, 2012.... "One Bright Hour" [Starsong]
2. Awaken My Soul: Songs of Redemption, 2012 .... "Sing Over Me" [StarSong]
3. BEC Recordings Summer Sampler 2011, 2011 .... "Everything I Hoped You'd Be" (from Ocean) [BEC]
4. Christmas Is All Around Us, 2010 .... "What Child Is This" [StarSong]
5. Open the Eyes of My Heart: Platinum Edition, 2010 .... "Great Light Of The World" [INO]
6. O Come All Ye Faithful: A Christmas Album, 2010 .... "Joy to the World," "Have Yourself A Merry Little Christmas" (from Christmas...) [BEC]
7. WOW Best Of 2004, 2010 .... "Great Light of the World" (from Myself When I Am Real) [EMI CMG]
8. Workout & Worship, 2009 .... "Pull Me Out" [Starsong]
9. Christian Music's Most Requested, 2007 .... "Great Light of the World" (from Myself When I Am Real) [Brentwood]
10. The Way We Love EP, 2007 .... "Sunday" (from Between the Dreaming and the Coming True) [Provident]
11. The Ultimate Collection: Love Songs, 2006 .... "A Page Is Turned" [EMI CMG]
12. WOW Worship: Aqua, 2006 .... "Sometimes By Step" (w/ Rich Mullins) [Provident]
13. WOW Hits 2006, 2005 .... "Nothing Without You" [Sparrow]
14. Come Let Us Adore Him, 2005 .... "Mary's Prayer" (New Version w/ Christine Byrd), "Holy, Holy, Holy Lord" (w/ Danielle Young and Friends) [Essential]
15. The Christ: His Passion, 2004 .... "Beautiful Scandalous Night" (w/ Sixpence); "Lamb Of God (Agnus Dei)" (w/ Casting Crowns); "Yes I Will" (w/ Joy Williams) [Essential]
16. WOW Hits 2005, 2004 .... "Disappear" [EMI CMG]
17. WOW Worship: Red, 2004 .... "Amazing Love" [Word]
18. WOW Hits 2004, 2003 .... "Great Light of the World" (From Myself When I Am Real) [Sparrow]
19. City on a Hill: The Gathering, 2003 .... "The Gathering" [Essential]
20. It Takes Two: 15 Collaborations & Duets, 2003 .... "Mercies New" (w/ Nichole Nordeman) [Sparrow]
21. Dove Hits 2003, 2003 .... "Great Light Of The World" (From Myself When I Am Real) [Reunion]
22. Essential Hits Ten, 2002 .... "The Hammer Holds" (From The Fabric of Verse) [Essential]
23. WOW Hits 2003, 2002 .... "Holy Is Your Name" (from City On A Hill: Sing Alleluia) [Sparrow]
24. City on a Hill: Sing Alleluia, 2002 .... "Holy Is Your Name" [Essential]
25. WOW Hits 2002, 2001 .... "Cover Me" (From BigBlueSky) [Sparrow]
26. Above the Groove: 17 Songs From Today's Top Christian Artists, 2002 .... "Everything Under The Sun" [Provident]
27. Essential Energy Christmas, 2000 .... "Mary's Prayer" [Essential]
28. Celebrate Freedom Live, 1998 .... "Stand" (From Ten Thousand Days) [Benson]
29. The Awakening Volume 1, 1996 .... "The Hammer Holds" (From The Fabric of Verse) [Awakening]
