= Great Light of the World: The Best of Bebo Norman =

Compilation album by Bebo Norman
- Released: September 25, 2007
- Genre: Contemporary Christian music, folk
- Label: Essential

Bebo Norman chronology
| Between the Dreaming and the Coming True (2006) | Great Light of the World: The Best of Bebo Norman (2007) | Christmas... From the Realms of Glory (2007) |

Great Light of the World: The Best of Bebo Norman is the first compilation greatest hits album by contemporary Christian musiccian Bebo Norman. The album is the last with Essential Records, and his seventh album overall including his first independent release. This album was released on September 25, 2007.

== Critical reception ==
Professional ratings
Review scores
| Source | Rating |
|---|---|
| Cross Rhythms | 9/10 squares |

Cross Rhythms's Dancin' Dave Derbyshire said that "this Georgia-born troubadour is ever popular both sides of the pond and across the generations and this 'Best Of. . .' album contains some of his most thoughtful songs from his previous albums. I love the honest lyrics of the praise song to God that says 'I lift my eyes to the God that heals the hurt I hold inside.' Yes we can praise God while we still hold on to that hurt but we can look to a God that we believe will heal us. These are creative lyrics that reflect his longing for a partner and the positive messages of hope. But none of these wonderful lyrics will prepare you for "The Hammer Holds", a story told from the point of view of the piece of steel being moulded by a hammer which appears to be rather like the potter and the clay parable. But then it becomes apparent that the destiny of the metal is to become one of the nails used to crucify Jesus. If you want to buy just one album of Bebo's work this would be an excellent choice."

== Track listing ==
1. "I Will Lift My Eyes" (Norman, Jason Ingram) - 4:29
2. "Nothing Without You" (Norman, Mitch Dane) - 3:56
3. "Great Light of the World" (Norman, Ed Cash) - 4:11
4. "Holy Is Your Name"; featuring Caedmon's Call (Marc Byrd, Steve Hindalong) - 3:29
5. "Falling Down" (Norman, Ed Cash, Scott Cash) - 3:49
6. "Into the Day" (Norman, Ingram) - 3:59
7. "The Hammer Holds" (Norman) - 5:21
8. "Tip of my Heart" (Norman) - 4:02
9. "Stand" (Norman) - 3:59
10. "Sometimes by Step"; featuring Rich Mullins (Rich Mullins, Beaker) - 4:24

== Credits ==
- Producers – Jason Ingram (Tracks 1 & 6); Bebo Norman (Tracks 1, 3, 5 & 6); Mitch Dane (Track 2); Ed Cash (Tracks 3, 5, 7, 8 & 9); Marc Byrd and Steve Hindalong (Track 4); Glenn Rosenstein (Track 10).
- A&R – Jordyn Connor
- A&R Production – Michelle Box
- Art Direction – Tim Parker
- Design – Marcus Melton and Tim Parker
- Photography – Robert Ascroft, Jeremy Cowart, David Dobson and Michael Wilson.
