= 10 Days =

Ten Days or 10 Days may refer to:

== Music ==
- "Ten Days", a 2002 song by Celine Dion from A New Day Has Come
- "Ten Days" (song), 2004, by Missy Higgins
- Ten Days (album), 2024, by Fred Again

== Military history ==
- Ten Days' Campaign, Dutch attempt to repress Belgian Revolution 1831
- Ten-Day War, following Slovenian declaration of independence 1991
- Ten Crucial Days, of the American Revolution, the battles of Trenton and Princeton, from December 25, 1776, to January 3, 1777

== See also ==
- Ten More Days
- Ten Tragic Days
- 10,000 Days (disambiguation)
