= Try (Bebo Norman album) =

Studio album by Bebo Norman
- Released: August 24, 2004
- Genre: Contemporary Christian music, folk
- Length: 44:18
- Label: Essential
- Producer: Brown Bannister, Matt Bronleewe, Mitch Dane

Bebo Norman chronology
| Myself When I Am Real (2002) | Try (2004) | Between the Dreaming and the Coming True (2006) |

Try is the fourth studio album by contemporary Christian musician Bebo Norman. The album is the third with Essential Records, and his fifth album overall, including his first independent release. This album was released on August 24, 2004, and the producers are Brown Bannister, Matt Bronleewe and Mitch Dane.

== Critical reception ==
Professional ratings
Review scores
| Source | Rating |
|---|---|
| CCM Magazine | B+ |
| Christianity Today | 3.5/5 stars |
| Cross Rhythms | 8/10 squares |
| Jesus Freak Hideout | 4/5 stars |
| Melodic.net | 2.5/5 stars |

AllMusic's Rovi said that "like a John Mayer or Jack Johnson for the Contemporary Christian set, Bebo Norman plays earthy, soulful, acoustic-based music honed though hard touring. As with the aforementioned artists, he tempers his classic sensitive singer/songwriter fare with a keen ear for pop melody and passionate delivery." In addition, Rovi wrote that the album is "a sure candidate for a CCM/pop crossover, Norman reveals himself as an artist primed and ready for the mainstream on TRY."

CCM Magazine's David McCreary said that "continuing in a similar vein is the decidedly organic, acoustic-driven project Try, Norman’s fourth studio release. In many ways the selections found here recall the unobtrusive nature of his earliest work, most notably the independent The Fabric of Verse. That’s not to say Norman has regressed musically; but, rather, that ostensibly he desires to remain true to the essence of his artistry." Furthermore, McCreary wrote that "another distinct difference evidenced on Try is the absence of expected tracks relating to singleness or longing for romance. It’s no coincidence that Norman’s affinity for such topics has shifted, given his recent departure from bachelorhood". McCreary went on to say that "by design, Norman and his production team have created a restrained yet magnetic sonic template intended to draw the listener in and not let go until the final note is played. And that’s exactly what happens each time this disc is spun."

Christianity Today's Russ Breimeier said that "Try is unquestionably a good album, but it indicates an approach by Bebo Norman that is simpler, not more sophisticated."

Cross Rhythms' Alan Chesters said that the album is "generally concerned with searching for, finding and experiencing faith" and how "each song seems to fit him like a glove and with arrangements easy and varied on the ear, from ballad to up-tempo, there's not a dud track to be found."

Jesus Freak Hideout's John DiBiase said that "Try succeeds on many levels as Bebo Norman continues to write relevant and meaningful songs for listeners to associate with and worship along to. While maybe not as powerful in some respects as Myself..., Try marks a new chapter in the life of an incredible artist and musician, and like in any good book, continues to carry the listener along Bebo Norman's life story quite nicely."

Melodic's Pär Winberg said that "Bebo is one of my biggest favourites the last couple of years. His 3 latest albums have all three been a superb show in soft Midwestern singer songwriter rock. Add Bebo?s marvellous voice to the recipe and you all understand that I have some expectations on the guy. Unfortunately the new album is his weakest of the four. It feels quite uninspired and the songs are just there as a ?nice? background companion without grabbing the heart as his stuff use to do. The album is also far too soft and? nah? a major disappointment is what it is. Unfortunately."

== Track listing ==
Tracklist
| No. | Title | Writer(s) | Length |
|---|---|---|---|
| 1. | "Finding You" | Bebo Norman, Mitch Dane, Ryan Booth | 3:33 |
| 2. | "Nothing Without You" | Norman, Dane | 3:33 |
| 3. | "Disappear" | Chad Cates, Jess Cates | 3:49 |
| 4. | "Try" | Norman, Brandon Heath | 4:35 |
| 5. | "Standing in Your Silence" | Norman | 3:28 |
| 6. | "Other Side of Day" | Norman, Dane, Ed Cash | 3:27 |
| 7. | "Soldier" | Heath | 3:38 |
| 8. | "Drifting" | Norman, Matt Bronleewe | 4:45 |
| 9. | "How You Love Me" | Norman | 1:33 |
| 10. | "Yes I Will" | Norman, Steve Hindalong, Marc Byrd | 3:18 |
| 11. | "Borrow Mine" | Norman | 4:40 |
| 12. | "Nothing Without You" (Alternative Version) | Norman, Dane | 3:59 |
| Total length: | | | 44:18 |

== Personnel ==
- Bebo Norman – vocals, acoustic guitars
- Mitch Dane – Wurlitzer electric piano (1), acoustic guitars (1), vibraslap (1), electric guitars (2), drum programming (2, 10), percussion (5), Rhodes (6), acoustic piano (9), analog delay effects (9)
- Cason Cooley – acoustic piano (5, 6)
- Matt Bronleewe – keyboards (7), electric guitar (7), Wurlitzer electric piano (8)
- Jamie Kenney – keyboards (12)
- Ryan Booth – electric 12-string guitar (1), acoustic guitars (2), percussion (2)
- Stephen Mason – electric guitars (1, 4, 6), pedal steel guitar (1, 5), backing vocals (1), lap steel guitar (4), banjo (5), baritone guitar (6), mandolin (6)
- Kenny Meeks – acoustic guitars (1, 2), nylon guitar (1, 10), mandolin (2)
- Gabe Scott – lap steel guitar (2, 10), accordion (10)
- Bruce Gaitsch – acoustic guitars (3, 8, 11)
- Chris Graffagnino – electric guitars (3, 11)
- Paul Moak – acoustic guitars (12)
- Aaron Sands – bass (1, 2, 4, 6, 10)
- James Gregory – bass (3, 7, 8, 11, 12)
- Grant Norsworthy – bass (5)
- Andy Hubbard – drums (1, 2, 4–6, 10), percussion (1, 2, 10)
- Eric Darken – drums (3, 7, 8, 11)
- Dan Needham – drums (12)
- Matt Slocum – cello (2, 10)
- John Catchings – cello (8)
- Keith Getty – string arrangements and conductor (3, 11)
- Prague Philharmonic Orchestra – strings (3, 11)
- Dan Muckala – string arrangements (12)
- Anthony LaMarchina – cello (12)
- Chris Wilkinson – viola (12)
- David Angell – violin (12)
- David Davidson – violin (12)
- Charlie Lowell – backing vocals (1)
- Brandon Heath – backing vocals (2, 4, 6, 10), acoustic guitars (7)
- Jill Phillips – backing vocals (5)
- Ellie Holcomb – backing vocals (12)
- Michael Mellett – backing vocals (12)

== Production ==
- Executive producer – Jordyn Conner
- Producers – Mitch Dane (1, 2, 4–6, 9, 10); Matt Bronleewe (3, 7, 8, 11); Brown Bannister (12).
- Orchestra technical producer on tracks 3, 11 – Joni McCabe
- Engineers – Mitch Dane (1, 2, 4–6, 9 & 10); Aaron Swihart (3, 7, 8 & 11); Steve Bishir (Track 12).
- Assistant Engineer on Tracks 3, 7, 8 & 11 – Michael Modesto
- Recorded at Sputnik Sound and Dark Horse Recording Studio (Franklin, TN); Pentavarit and Alex The Great Recording (Nashville, TN).
- Mixing – Richard Dodd (Tracks 1–11); Steve Bishir (Track 12).
- Mix Assistant on Tracks 1–11 – David Streit
- Mixed at Oxford Sound (Nashville, TN).
- Digital Editing – Dave Dillbeck and Bill Whittington
- Mastered by Richard Dodd at RichardDodd.com
- A&R production – Michelle Pearson
- Production coordinator on track 12 – Traci Sterling Bishir
- Art Direction – Stephanie McBrayer and Bebo Norman
- Cover Design, Package Design and Photography – Jeremy Cowart
- Management – Blanton Harrell Cooke & Corzine.

== Charts ==
| Chart (2004) | Peak position |
|---|---|
| US Billboard 200 | 159 |
| US Heatseekers Albums (Billboard) | 9 |
| US Top Christian Albums (Billboard) | 7 |
