= Britney (song) =

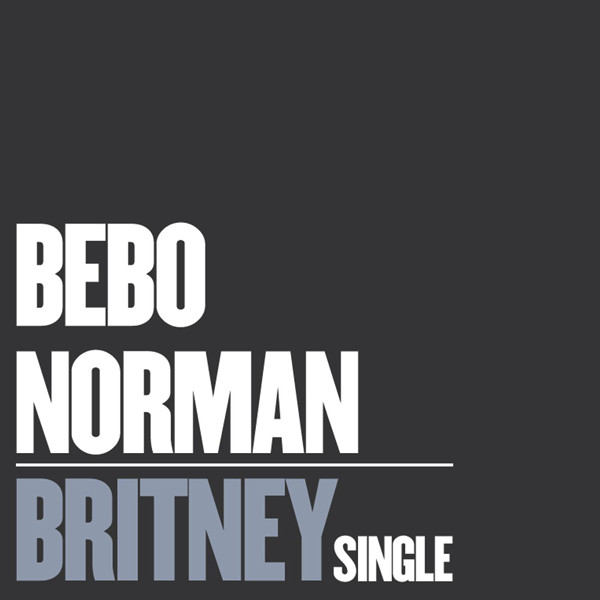

Single by Bebo Norman

from the album Bebo Norman
- Released: July 28, 2008
- Recorded: 2008
- Genre: Folk, contemporary Christian music
- Length: 3:34
- Label: BEC
- Songwriters: Bebo Norman, Jason Ingram
- Producers: Bebo Norman, Jason Ingram, Rusty Varenkamp

Bebo Norman singles chronology
"Into the Day" (2007)	"Britney" (2008)	"The Only Hope" (2008)

"Britney" is a song by American singer-songwriter Bebo Norman. It was written and produced by Norman for his ninth self-titled studio album (2008), with additional writing by Jason Ingram. The song was released on July 28, 2008 through BEC Records as the album's first single. The inspirational folk song, is an apology to pop singer Britney Spears for the consequences of fame and success.

"Britney" was very well received by music critics, with some calling it "sweet" and "not cynical at all," and noticing the song's sympathetic message to Spears. After its release, Lynne Spears praised the song and thanked Norman for writing it. "Britney" failed to chart on Billboard Hot 100, but did manage to peak at number 28 on the Hot Christian Adult Contemporary chart.

== Background and composition ==
"Britney"
A sample of Bebo Norman's "Britney" features Norman apologizing to the pop star for several facts.

"Britney" was written by Bebo Norman in the beginning of 2008 as an apology to the pop singer Britney Spears, after watching a news report about Spears on television. The song was later recorded and produced by Norman for his self-titled album, with additional production by Jason Ingram and Rusty Varenkamp. When asked about the song, Norman said:

"'Britney' is a song about what our culture says and does to young women these days. It's about the lies we tell them about fame and money and what's beautiful and what will give them life. It's an apology for those lies. But more than that, it's an invitation to the truth about a God who is bigger than the pain this world so often leaves them in."

"Britney" is an inspirational ballad with elements of folk music, that lasts for three minutes and thirty-four seconds long. Josh Taylor of Jesus Freak Hideout compared its structure to "Hey There Delilah" by the Plain White T's. The song was released on July 28, 2008 as a digital single on iTunes Store, two months before the official release of Norman's album. Despite not being a Spears fan, Norman enjoys her song "Toxic".

== Reception ==
Upon its release, "Britney" received generally positive reviews from critics. Andree Farias of AllMusic highlighted "Britney" on Bebo Norman's album, saying, "the left-field stunner is "Britney", a poignant, heartfelt ode to the teen pop superstar that also serves as a sharp analysis of culture's make-or-break treatment of celebrities." The team of New Release Tuesday, "a popular music website in the Christian community", praised the song, with reviews saying, "["Britney"] is without a doubt one of Bebo Norman's best songs." A review by Lancaster Online called "Britney" a "hit song", and described it as "a compassionate look at someone damaged, but maybe not broken, by the relentless glare of the spotlight." Kim Jones of About.com called the song an "anthem of sorts". Deborah Evan Price of Billboard said "Britney" has "a sympathetic message to the burnished pop singer."

Josh Taylor of Jesus Freak Hideout said, "the way in which [Norman] continually addresses Britney Spears just seems the least bit odd", but commented on how pleasant the song is. A review by Idolator noticed "Britney" has "a melody that dares to be clear and pretty in ways emo bands [...] don’t usually dare," and commented how the song's "strongly sung" lyrics are "sweet [and] not cynical at all." The Denver Post reported that after the song's release, Spears' mother Lynne thanked Norman for writing the song, "because it was all she wanted to say to her daughter." On the week of September 19, 2008, "Britney" peaked at number twenty-eight on Billboard Hot Christian Adult Contemporary chart.

== Personnel ==
Credits adapted from album liner notes.

- Bebo Norman – lead vocals, songwriting, acoustic guitar, background vocals
- Mike Payne – acoustic guitar, electric guitar
- Adam Lester – electric guitar
- Jason Ingram – keyboards, songwriting, programming, background vocals
- Josh Moore – keyboards
- Tony Lucido – bass guitar
- Will Sayles – drums
- Ben Phillips – drums
- Rusty Varenkamp – programming

== Charts ==
Chart performance for "Britney"
Chart (2008)	Peak position
US Christian Adult Contemporary (Billboard)	23

== Release history ==
Release history for "Britney"
Region	Date	Format	Label	Ref.
Australia	July 28, 2008	Digital download; streaming	BEC Records	
Canada	July 29, 2008	Digital download; streaming	Tooth & Nail Records	
France	July 29, 2008	Digital download; streaming	BEC Records	
Germany	July 29, 2008	Digital download; streaming	BEC Records	
Netherlands	July 29, 2008	Digital download; streaming	BEC Records	
United States	July 29, 2008	Digital download; streaming	BEC Records	
