= Here Goes =

Single by Bebo Norman

from the album Ocean
- Released: August 31, 2010
- Genre: Contemporary Christian music, folk
- Length: 3:29 (single); 3:24 (album)
- Label: BEC
- Songwriters: Brandon Heath, Jason Ingram, Bebo Norman
- Producers: Jason Ingram, Bebo Norman

Bebo Norman singles chronology
"Hear it From Me" (2010)	"Here Goes" (2010)	"God of my Everything" (2012)

"Here Goes" is a song by contemporary Christian musician Bebo Norman from his eighth studio album, Ocean. It was released on August 31, 2010, as the first single from the album.

It was produced by Jason Ingram and Bebo Norman and written by Brandon Heath, Ingram and Norman.

== Critical reception ==
Louder Than the Music's Jono Davies said the song is a "great power soft rock" song and AllMusic's James Christopher Monger wrote the song is "easy midtempo" in terms of styling. In addition, Kevin Davis of New Release Tuesday noted how the song "advocates a life marked by leaps into the unknown while reasoning, 'I never loved anyone by playing it safe . . . never lost and never found are one and the same.'" Davis and Jeremy V. Jones of Christianity Today called the song a top track of Norman's, with Davis going so far as to say it is in the Top-10 of his career. Furthermore, CCM Magazine's Matt Conner called the song one of the most "beautiful pop gems". On the other side, The Christian Manifesto's Lydia Akinola was critical in saying the song "left a little disappointed, which I found surprising for an artist I knew so little about. It may be the tired lyrics of the chorus (“here’s goes nothing, here’s goes everything, gotta reach for something, or you’ll fall for anything”), but it didn’t leave an impression." In addition, Jen Rose of Jesus Freak Hideout seconded that opinion in saying "'Here Goes' is a decent enough pop song, but compared with the poetry found elsewhere on the album, lines like 'gotta reach for something / or you'll fall for anything' fall flat."

== Weekly charts ==
Chart (2010)	Peak position
US Billboard Christian AC Indicator	14
US Billboard Christian Adult Contemporary	20
US Billboard Christian CHR	28
US Billboard Christian Songs	28
