= 10,000 Days =

10,000 Days or Ten Thousand Days may refer to:

- 10,000 Days (Tool album) (2006)
- 10,000 Days (Saga album) (2007)
- Ten Thousand Days (album), 1999, by Bebo Norman
- Ten Thousand Days (film), a 1967 Hungarian drama film by Ferenc Kósa and starring Tibor Molnár

== See also ==
- Vietnam: The Ten Thousand Day War, a 1980 Canadian television documentary
