= Bebo Norman (album) =

Studio album by Bebo Norman
- Released: September 16, 2008
- Studio: Emack Studio (Franklin, Tennessee)
- Genre: Acoustic, contemporary Christian music
- Length: 36:27
- Label: BEC
- Producer: Bebo Norman; Jason Ingram; Rusty Varenkamp

Bebo Norman chronology
Christmas... From the Realms of Glory (2007)	Bebo Norman (2008)	Ocean (2010)

Singles from Bebo Norman
- 1. "Britney" Released: July 28, 2008; 2. "The Only Hope" Released: 2008; 3. "Pull Me Out" Released: September 22, 2008; 4. "Never Saw You Coming" Released: 2008

Bebo Norman is the eponymously named sixth studio album by Christian Contemporary Christian musician Bebo Norman. The album is the second with BEC Recordings, which was his first studio album with the label, and his ninth album overall including his first independent release. This album was released on September 16, 2008, and the producers are Bebo Norman, Jason Ingram, and Rusty Varenkamp.

== Track listing ==
All tracks are written by Bebo Norman and Jason Ingram, except where noted.

No.	Title	Writer(s)	Length
1.	"Pull Me Out"	Bebo Norman, Jason Ingram, Don Chaffer	4:18
2.	"Hear It From Me"	Bebo Norman, Jason Ingram, Adam Mortiz	3:50
3.	"Not Living in the In-Between"		3:05
4.	"Britney"		3:34
5.	"Ruins"		3:44
6.	"Never Saw You Coming"		3:47
7.	"A Million Raindrops"		3:46
8.	"The Only Hope"		3:42
9.	"Can't Live Without You"		3:34
10.	"One Bright Hour"		3:00
Total length:			36:27

== Personnel ==
- Bebo Norman – vocals, backing vocals, acoustic guitars
- Jason Ingram – keyboards (1, 2, 4–10), programming, backing vocals
- Rusty Varenkamp – programming
- Josh Moore – keyboards (3)
- Adam Lester – electric guitars (1–5, 7–10)
- Mike Payne – acoustic guitars, electric guitars (6)
- Tony Lucido – bass
- Will Sayles – drums (1–5, 7–10)
- Ben Phillips – drums (6)

== Production ==
- Tyson Paoletti – executive producer, A&R
- Jason Ingram – producer
- Bebo Norman – producer
- Rusty Varenkamp – producer, engineer
- Lee Bridges – mixing
- Andrew Mendelson – mastering at Georgetown Masters (Nashville, Tennessee)
- Traci Bishir – production assistant
- Jordan Butcher – art direction, design
- Anthony Saint James – photography
- Mitch White – management
- Kevin Huffman – booking

== Charts ==
Chart (2008)	Peak position
US Top Christian Albums (Billboard)	13

== Singles ==
- "Britney" was released on July 28, 2008, through BEC Records as the album's first single It was written by himself and co-written by Jason Ingram. Lyrically, the song is an apology to pop singer Britney Spears for the consequences of fame and success. "Britney" was very well received into the Christian community, with reviews calling it one of the best songs by Norman. After its release, Lynne Spears praised the song and thanked Norman for writing it.
- "The Only Hope"
- "Pull Me Out"
- "Never Saw You Coming"

== Critical reception ==
Professional ratings
Review scores
Source	Rating
About.com (Kim Jones)	4.5/5 stars
AllMusic (Andree Farias)	4/5 stars
Christianity Today (Russ Breimeier)	4/5 stars
Cross Rhythms (Jacob Wain)	10/10 squares
Jesus Freak Hideout (Josh Taylor)	2.5/5 stars
Melodic.net (Cor Jan Kat)	4.5/5 stars
New Release Tuesday (Kevin Davis) (Kevin McNeese) (Nathan) (Andrew Greer)	5/5 stars 3.5/5 stars 4.5/5 stars

Kim Jones of About.com said, "most albums have some good music and a few great highlights. Bebo Norman's self-titled release offers up a lot of great music and more highlights than should be legal. Like all of Bebo's music so far, Bebo Norman tells a story and this chapter is by far the most telling so far. Open, honest and sincere, the lyrics show us a man who is walking out his faith one step at a time, not claiming to have all of the answers, but knowing the one who does. The music is purely acoustic excellence with a hint of rock." In addition, Jones added that "the only problem that I had at all with Bebo Norman is that at only 37 minutes long, I was left longing for more. Bebo is one of the few artists out there that can make simple honesty sound wonderful without adding a bunch of bells and whistles to jazz it up. The messages that he shares on this album are timely and like any good story, I didn't want it to be over."

Andree Farias of AllMusic said, "self-titled releases tend to make a statement of some sort, whether you're a newcomer, a veteran, or just a has-been gunning for a second chance. In the case of Christian pop troubadour Bebo Norman, his self-titled debut for BEC Recordings is none of the above. Instead, Bebo Norman is a collection of anthems, introspection, and commentary that bridge the singer/songwriter's collegiate folk past with his latter-day adult contemporary glories. While pop choruses slowly became a requirement during his previous major-label tenure, here the huge refrains appear effortless, almost as if Norman has learned to internalize and make his own the fact that his thoughtful take on the Christian experience merits exposure beyond the coffeehouse. Songs like "Pull Me Out," "Never Saw You Coming," and "The Only Hope" are as grand and populist as Norman has ever gotten, but they're written from a place of brokenness and inadequacy, looking to God not as a means to an end but as the end itself. In a nod to his humble beginnings, Norman goes the folk-pop route in almost equal measure ("A Million Raindrops," "Not Living in the In-Between"), and the style comes to him with great ease. Of these, the left-field stunner is "Britney," a poignant, heartfelt ode to the teen pop superstar that also serves as a sharp analysis of culture's make-or-break treatment of celebrities. Bebo Norman is indeed the portrait of an older, wiser, and more self-assured Norman—someone who is blessed to make faith-based music out of the abundance of his heart rather than out of the stringent demands of the CCM machine."

Russ Breimeier of Christianity Today' said, "Bebo Norman's first regular release through BEC Recordings (after 2007's Christmas … From the Realms of Glory) picks up where he left off musically with his 2006 effort, Between the Dreaming and the Coming True. Reteaming with Jason Ingram for production and writing, it's virtually a sequel in terms of sound and style—once again, more pop than his earlier folk-fueled efforts." Furthermore, Breimeier wrote that "at nearly 37 minutes, this is a relatively short album for Norman, and admittedly, not every song is as excellent as another. Overall, it's still missing those little inspired moments of artistry that often elevate a small pop album to a classic. But that said, this singer/songwriter has a firmer grasp on solid pop craftsmanship than most with strong melodies and honest, accessible lyricism. When Bebo Norman is good, he's very good—and when he uses his own life experience to express something more poetic or personable, he's even better."

Jacob Wain of Cross Rhythms said, "this, Bebo's eighth album, is an intricate mixture of soft rock, artful pop with occasional folk tinges. Most tracks engage the listener through pacey choruses and mellow refrains." Plus, Wain wrote that "as Bebo himself says about this album, 'I like that we took the core of where I come from as a writer and made it feel new again.' If you want an album with catchy heartfelt songs that stick in your head and profound lyrics make sure you get to hear 'Bebo Norman'."

Josh Taylor of Jesus Freak Hideout said, "there is stuff to like, but it is more often than not covered in a format all too similar to listeners. If you are just looking for another solid collection of acoustic/folk tracks from a guy who has been around the block a time or two, you will find them here. If you were hoping for something more from a guy who has been doing this for nearly a decade, you will more likely than not be a little disappointed. Norman is a great musician and a lyricist who can wear his heart on his sleeve. Let's hope that on the next go around, he really does take what he does best and make it feel new again."

Cor Jan Kat of Melodic.net said, "Bebo Norman has been around for quite a while now in the Christian musicscene. He started off as a midwestern singer songwriter and turned to modern pop on his last album “Between the dreaming and the coming true” and on his new album simply called 'Bebo Norman' he continues on the modern pop approach, with acoustic elements but also some hints of rock like the music of labelmate Jeremy Camp. Also a band like Third Day comes to mind, especially the Powell-like vibrato in the vocals. There is more guitar on the album than on his last one and that makes the album the more enjoyable. We knew that Bebo could write songs, he has proven this in the past, and so he comes with an album filled with excellent songwriting with also much about his own experiences in life. Listen for example to the song 'Britney' (yes, also about a very famous one...) and the brilliant 'Ruins'. But actually I could mention every song on the album that is his best to date. For lovers of modern pop/rock this one is a must buy and won't be disappointing and that's a promise!"

Kevin Davis of New Release Tuesday said, "Bebo Norman is richly loaded with personal themes of coming out of depression, prayerful reflection and hope-filled expressions of joy in Christ. This album stands out like Deep Enough To Dream by Chris Rice in that you can't help but root for this album and artist because you can immediately identify with the personal nature of the songs."

Kevin McNeese of New Release Tuesday said, "Beyond a great collection of music, Bebo Norman presents an artist that is truly at the top of his form, both vocally and collaboratively. His openness to work with other songwriters for the first time has certainly paid off and as Bebo begins to confront some of his inner demons beyond his songwriting, we’re seeing an artist who is more vulnerable and honest with the greatness of God than ever before." So, McNesse wrote that Bebo Norman has "impressed me more than any other album he’s released."

Nathan of New Release Tuesday said, "Bebo Norman described his music on his self titled record 'dramatic' and surprisingly so it’s not so far off the mark. Some of his song has a good deal of emotion as well as being artistic, lyrically and musically. It’s nice to know that artists like Norman haven’t shown fans all of the tricks in his bag, so kudos to him and here’s to many more solid releases at BEC."

Andrew Greer of Christian Music Planet thru New Release Tuesday said, "What’s so interesting about Norman’s music is his aptitude for good pop while never forfeiting the integrity of each and every line. And on Bebo Norman the singer/songwriter takes the next step in a career that is sure to be celebrated for many years."
