= Lights of Distant Cities =

Studio album by Bebo Norman
- Released: October 23, 2012
- Genre: Contemporary Christian music, folk
- Length: 40:40
- Label: BEC
- Producer: Bebo Norman; Gabe Scott; Ben Shive

Bebo Norman chronology
Ocean (2010)	Lights of Distant Cities (2012)

Lights of Distant Cities is the eighth and final studio album by contemporary Christian musician Bebo Norman. The album is the fourth with BEC Recordings, and his eleventh album overall including his first independent release. This album was released on October 23, 2012, and the producers are Bebo Norman, Gabe Scott and Ben Shive. This album has seen chart and critical reception successes, since it has been released.

== Background ==
=== Album ===
Bebo Norman told CCM Magazine's Caroline Lusk in the October 2012 edition that he "'found that this particular record is one of the more pure representations of me in a long time,...I just feel like I'm at a place that I'm okay with whatever happens on a musical and life level.'" Norman explained that "'this record was written in two different seasons..., I had slipped into sort of this desert season. Life had caught up with me. When I get into that place when I feel distant from God, I start to question a lot of things, doubt a lot of things. If this world looks like it's falling apart, then love is not winning, God is not winning. If God is not winning, is God really God?'" He shines some light on the evolution of how this album came into existence, which Norman told "'this all just snuck up on me and in the process of expressing those songs I wanted to be really honest,...I didn't have an answer for everything. So I went on a trip by myself. It was one of the first times I fasted. I had this really beautiful kind of awakening experience. It was very simple…no lighting bolts bolts, no big dream. It was very subtle, very surreal, life altering'". Norman foretold how he "'...stumbled on this quote from the German mystic Meister Eckhart, 'If the soul could have known God without the world, the God would never have created the world.' There is a real goodness about God. Even when it seems the world has gone dark, there are still beautiful things to hope for".

=== Songs ===
Norman told that the song "Lights of Distant Cities" "'...is the most joyful song on the record,...It was represented by hope and that was kind of the goal, especially on songs with a darker lyrical content. In the production phase, the real goal is to create moments where the contrast is very represented—hope and lack of hope. That's where Gabe and Ben really took off and ran with things.'"

=== Personnel ===
On working with Gabe Scott, Norman told that "'he's played nearly every show I've done,...But we had never once written a song together.'" Now, they have written numerous songs on this album. In addition, Norman suggested "'they [Gabe and Ben] have this idea where they look at the music itself as an emotional component. What does joy sound like? We started from that angle and they took the whole record in a direction that was totally new. It has this real songwriter feel to it.'"

=== Style ===
Norman portends how the mindset was that they "'decided to create these songs exactly how we wanted to create them and pay no mind to commercial appeal. Not because that's bad, but to create what we want to hear and just let it go. There was so much freedom in that.'" Norman foresees that he "'...want[s] people to get it on the fourth or fifth listen...Sometimes you sacrifice depth and quality for initial or instant success. Hopefully, there will be something there for everyone. After all these years in music, I'm ok with that if it doesn't happen commercially.'" Norman reveals that he doesn't "'...feel resigned to be done with music at all...I'm just inspired to do it on whatever level. No need to prove anything.'"

== Critical reception ==
Professional ratings
Review scores
Source	Rating
About.com	5/5 stars
AllMusic	3.5/5 stars
CCM Magazine	4/5 stars
Christian Broadcasting Network	4/5 spins
Christian Music Zine	(4.25/5)
Christianity Today	4/5 stars
Cross Rhythms	8/10 squares
Indie Vision Music	4/5 stars
Jesus Freak Hideout	4.5/5 stars 4/5 stars
Louder Than The Music	4.5/5 stars
New Release Tuesday	4.5/5 stars
Worship Leader	4.5/5 stars

About.com's Kim Jones said that the album contains "Satisfying songwriting meets memorable music and the end result is 11 songs that offer light and hope to a world in desperate need of both." In addition, Jones wrote that "Bebo Norman has long been known for his meaningful lyrics and Lights of Distant Cities shows that as he ages, he just gets better with his writing. Centered around the theme of finding light in the darkness and being that light in a world of darkness, he also delves into the effects that we all feel from the darkness that comes from sin." Jones gave credence that "Lights of Distant Cities could easily be called Bebo's best project yet -- no small feat after the eight powerhouse albums he has recorded since 1996". The bottom line according to Jones is that "Norman delivers a project that we can not just enjoy, but listen to and grow with. He brings light to the day that lasts long after the sun has gone down." Jones called the "standout tracks" "Daylight Breaking", "Just a Glimpse" and "Sing of Your Glory".

AllMusic's Robert Ham praised "The breathy tone of Bebo Norman's vocals suggests a man completely under the full sway of a spiritual/emotional trance of some kind. For many other singer/songwriters, that singing style would feel like a strange affectation. But for Norman, a CCM artist who has been part of the worship community for over a decade now, it adds so much poignancy and weight to these smartly appointed songs of struggle and redemption." However, Ham was quite critical, when he wrote that "What upends songs like the dramatic title track and the fist-pumping 'Outside Her Window Was the World' is when Norman aims for the cheap seats. The Georgia native hasn't the pipes to really command a room in such a brash fashion. The overheated production, with its reliance on programmed beats and quiet/loud/quiet dynamics, doesn't do him any favors, forcing Norman to try to keep up with the volume." Ham concluded on an upbeat note, and that was when he wrote that Bebo Norman "...is much better served when the tone of the album quiets to meet up with his delicate vibrato, adding depth and power to minimalist gems like 'Wine from Water' and 'Daylight Breaking.'"

CCM Magazine's Grace S. Aspinwall wrote that "Bebo Norman's latest album was borne out of what Norman calls, 'a long, slow progression, or digression, into a spiritual desert.' His vulnerability serves him well, especially on songs, "At the End of Me" and "Collide." Lights of Distant Cities is a testament to the goodness of the Lord, and the beauty of tangible songwriting." Lastly, Aspinwall and CCM Magazine called the "We Like" track on the album "Just a Glimpse".

Christian Broadcasting Network's Chris Carpenter wrote that "Bebo Norman takes the basic concept of honest, heartfelt lyrics and wraps them around atmospheric musical arrangements. Think muted tones and softened outlines. This is not to say Norman has lost some of his rootsy appeal. His folksy flair still exists in abundance. It is just that the added textures are a welcome addition. The results take this album to an entirely new level of artistic brilliance." In addition, Carpenter stated that Norman is "Not afraid of testing his tried and true folksy formula, this album is a gem that needs to be appreciated for its honest, worshipful charm."

Christian Music Zine's Joshua Andre said that "With such a great extent of brutal honesty and transparentness that Bebo brings, there is also in this transparent experience, songs which focus on frailties of the human condition and the questions we all want answered but are too afraid to ask. A sense of real freedom in the 11 offerings from Lights Of Distant Cities and a stark change to some of the radio friendly albums he recorded in the past, is also shown; and this unique track list has given me an appreciation to listen to songs free from the expectation of radio and commercial success; as Bebo has said previously, that his career is past its commercial peak. Regardless of 'tags' and 'brands' though, and whether Lights Of Distant Cities receives any commercial or critical acclaim and success, Bebo’s new album is one to savour, and will show us parts of ourselves that we may not even be aware of. Such a revealing album, this one may be Bebo’s best and most exposed yet, propelling him to near the top of my favourite songwriters, along with Andrew Peterson, Brandon Heath, and Steven Curtis Chapman." Further, Andre wrote that "With a myriad of genres explored in this authentic and candid tapestry of interconnecting themes and melodies, Bebo has given us 11 thoughtful and pleasing treasures, with plenty to extract and explore after each successive listen. While the 2012 October release date is full of many lyrical gems, such as Newsboys, Hyland, and Jonathan Thulin; Bebo’s release is bound to garner some buzz, and Lights Of Distant Cities is one of the most lyrically sound and vulnerable albums I have heard in a while! Hats off to Bebo, for making an album true to yourself, and for constructing and fashioning epic moments of total sincerity that we can all relate to!" The "favourite tracks" according to Andre are the following: "The Broken, At The End of Me, Sing Of Your Glory, Outside Her Window Was The World, Just A Glimpse".

Christianity Today's Andrew Greer said that "For longtime fans, Lights serves as a homecoming of sorts, to the song, to the lyric, to the heart behind a man who has lived nearly half his life musically testifying to an unchanging God. And for Norman the artist, these songs are a poignant journal from one who has wandered the desert a time or two, only to come home a bit wiser and truer to his craft than before." Greer's picks for "top tracks" on the album are "At the End of Me", "Collide", "Wine from Water".

Cross Rhythms' Oscar Hyde stated that "His lyrics are still the big drawing point here; no songs push at his musical boundaries, save for the bright and bubbly rhythmic synths sprinkled across songs, but really, when his lyrics are this good, I don't in the least mind safe and radio-friendly arrangements. None of the songs can be called any worse than 'pleasant'". Hyde concluded with affirming that "Norman's still at the top of his game; I can only expect this album's joys to increase upon further listening."

Indie Vision Music's Jonathan Andre said that "What has come from his ordeal through Light of Distant Cities may not necessarily be the most musically layered, or even that worshipful. But from real experience comes a realisation of beauty in being broken; that in the midst of our hurts comes a healing that may or may not be expected. Produced by Ben Shive (Andrew Peterson, Sara Groves), this album is able to highlight some of the things that we as listeners may try to cover up, reminding us to unveil what is holding us back, both to our creator and our fellow creation, understanding full well that ‘...at the end of me, that's where You start...’ (‘At the End of Me’). With a mixture of upbeat and reflective moments, from country style ‘The Broken’, the honest ‘At the End of Me’ and the humble worship piano-driven melody ‘Sing of Your Glory’, this album is certain to assert itself as one of the best albums in October 2012." Andre wrote that overall the album is "...not as musically driven as many other albums released throughout the year (from artists like TobyMac, Luminate, Bellarive, Britt Nicole or MercyMe); Bebo's acknowledgement of some of the darkest parts of himself, yet equally show us his source of strength and courage throughout his difficult moments is a miracle, bringing testament to Christ as Bebo unveils his most personal album to date. With much of these songs along the vein of previous ones like ‘Pull Me Out’, ‘Sing Over Me’ and ‘Cover Me’, Light of Distant Cities offers us a hope for our souls and the motivation to press on with our lives when times feel like it's slipping away, or if there seems to be a circumstance we cannot rid ourselves of. With a myriad of musical genres, from anthems to acoustics and reflective keyboard-prominent songs, these eleven melodies that make up the album are some of the most challenging, confronting and rewarding that Bebo has ever produced, making it one of the most satisfying musical experiences of October 2012. Well done Bebo for such an awe-inspiring and enjoyable album!"

Jesus Freak Hideout's Alex "Tincan" Caldwell said that "Lights of Distant Cities surrounds Bebo's always solid songwriting with atmospherics that lift the songs to stratospheric heights without losing his trademark lyrical intimacy." Also, Caldwell noted that "For those who wish Bebo Norman would return to the folksy roots of his first few albums, he manages the neat trick of adding texture and production to his acoustic guitar strumming on many tunes like "Daylight Breaking" and "World Gone Dark" and makes it all gel seamlessly. Album highlight "Outside Her Window Was The World" sounds like mixture of the late Rich Mullins and an 80's era Cure record, using aggressive guitars and synthesizers to tell the story of a young girl's struggle with cutting and subsequent spiritual awakening." Caldwell called the album "...a solid and holistic artistic statement on searching for God in this fallen world, Lights of Distant Cities is one of the year's best albums and a mid-career triumph for Bebo Norman."

Jesus Freak Hideout's Jerold Wallace said that "One of the most frequent complaints about Contemporary Christian music is a lack of genuineness. Countless songs with the same basic lyrics, song structure and message are available to you at the turn of a radio dial. Bebo Norman has been one artist that has dodged this label with his consistently passionate, transparent lyrics for the past 16 years. His newest release, Lights of Distant Cities, continues this trend with his remarkable songwriting and memorable collection of music." In addition, Wallace wrote that "Overall, Bebo Norman's tenth full-length is another solid release. While I wouldn't call it his career best, it is perhaps his most assessable album to date." Wallace called the top standout songs on the album the following: "Collide", "Go With You" and "Outside Her Window Was the World".

Louder Than The Music's Jono Davies said that "There are many sides to this album, but all the tracks sound great and this makes for a truly great album with excellent use of guitars and an extremely talented vocalist. But what marks this album out more than any other album is the fact that Bebo has such great imagery in his songs. There are not many songwriters that can do that over the course of a whole album." The standout tracks according to Davies and LTTM are "Sing of Your Glory", "At the End of Me" and "Daylight Break".

New Release Tuesday's Dawn Teresa said that "In Bebo Norman’s music, I’ve come to expect one thing: honesty. I appreciate his willingness to lay bare his vulnerabilities, and in his music I’ve often found assurance and comfort in knowing I’m not alone. On his latest effort, Lights of Distant Cities, it’s no surprise to find that Bebo’s done it again -- unapologetically written an album full of raw desperation. But don’t be deceived. Though he started writing steeped in hopelessness and spiritual darkness, he never ceased searching and praying. Eventually, God’s light broke through and hope found him, and Bebo finished with a set of songs that chronicle his personal journey through darkness into light and that serve as a beacon of encouragement for others." Teresa closed with "Fear not, Bebo fans. Though sonically different, Lights of Distant Cities is unmistakably Bebo Norman. He is not experimenting with his lyrics, only painting his sound with additional brush strokes. The songs give voice to Bebo’s transition from spiritual desperation to recovery. His experience proves that even in impenetrable darkness, though we cannot see the Light, we need to continue to seek God. For if we do, our Shepherd will pierce the night like a searchlight until His lost lamb is found. Lights of Distant Cities ranks among Bebo’s best work and is a must-have fall release."

Worship Leader's Jay Akins said that "Bebo Norman is certainly not a newcomer to these pages or to the Christian music scene overall—Lights of Distant Cities is his 12th record since he began recording music in 1996. With his unmistakably buttery voice Norman has a solid track record of delivering beautifully complex and honest stories from the journey of life. Yet, this album brings fresh perspective. He deftly covers the things we often hold so dear and relentlessly hang on to—the same things God wants us to loosen our hold on, so he can reshape and remold our lives. Often how we view ourselves is our biggest obstacle in the way of us seeing who we are in the light of God’s grace." Akins wrote that "This album is excellently produced and written. The stories will bring you to tears as you enter into these emotional and heartfelt anthems. As far as use in a service of worship, just about any track would work well to drive home a sermon point or as a theme song for a series." Akins said the album is "An absolute recommend for personal devotion, Lights reminds us that Norman is masterful at using the medium of music to draw your attention toward honoring and glorifying God in everyday moments." At the same time, Akins wrote that "This album is not specifically geared to corporate worship but can, and should, be incorporated in creative ways."

== Track listing ==
Track list
No.	Title	Writer(s)	Length
1.	"Lights of Distant Cities"	Bebo Norman, Gabe Scott	3:43
2.	"The Broken"	Matthew Ross Armstrong, Norman	3:39
3.	"At the End of Me"	Norman, Stephan Conley Sharp	4:03
4.	"Daylight Breaking"	Norman	3:31
5.	"World Gone Dark"	Norman, Scott	3:10
6.	"Sing of Your Glory"	Norman, Scott	4:51
7.	"Collide"	Norman, Scott	3:01
8.	"Wine from Water"	Norman	4:06
9.	"Outside Her Window Was the World"	Norman, Scott	3:40
10.	"Just a Glimpse"	Phillip LaRue, Norman, Scott	3:49
11.	"Go With You"	Andrew Fromm, Sarah Ruth Hart, Norman	3:07
Total length:			40:40

== Personnel ==
- Bebo Norman – vocals, backing vocals, acoustic guitars
- Ben Shive – acoustic piano, keyboards, Hammond B3 organ, programming
- Gabe Scott – acoustic piano, keyboards, programming, acoustic guitars, lap steel guitar, banjo, bouzouki, hammered dulcimer, backing vocals
- Adam Lester – electric guitars
- Tony Lucido – bass
- Paul Mabury – drums
- Ellie Holcomb – backing vocals (11)

== Production ==
- Producers – Bebo Norman, Gabe Scott and Ben Shive.
- A&R – Conor Farley
- Engineers – Dave Salley, Gabe Scott and Ben Shive.
- Additional Engineer on Track 11 – Allen Salmon
- Recorded at Ireland Studio, The Beehive and Fireside Studios (Nashville, TN).
- Mixed by Shane D. Wilson at Pentavarit Studios (Nashville, TN).
- Mix Assistant – Justin Dowse
- Mix Coordination – Lani Crump
- Mix Preparation – James Childs
- Editing – Gabe Scott and Ben Shive
- Mastered by Troy Glessner at Spectre Studios (Seattle, WA).
- Art Direction – Invisible Creatures, Inc.
- Design – Ryan Clark for Invisible Creatures, Inc.
- Photography – Lee Steffen

== Charts ==
Chart (2012)	Peak position
US Top Christian Albums (Billboard)	18
