= Between the Dreaming and the Coming True =

Studio album by Bebo Norman
- Released: September 19, 2006
- Studios: Blackbird Studios, Blue42 and Seventeen Grand Recording (Nashville, Tennessee); Bridge Street Studios and Little Hollywood Studios (Franklin, Tennessee)
- Genres: Contemporary Christian music, folk
- Length: 43:11
- Label: Essential
- Producers: Jason Ingram; Bebo Norman; Glenn Rosenstein

Bebo Norman chronology
Try (2004)	Between the Dreaming and the Coming True (2006)	Great Light of the World: The Best of Bebo Norman (2007)

Between the Dreaming and the Coming True is the fifth studio album by contemporary Christian musician, Bebo Norman. The album is the fourth with Essential Records, and his sixth album overall including his first independent release. This album was released on September 19, 2006, and the producers are Jason Ingram, Bebo Norman and Glenn Rosenstein.

== Critical reception ==
Professional ratings
Review scores
Source	Rating
AllMusic	4.5/5 stars
CCM Magazine	B+
Christianity Today	4.5/5 stars
Cross Rhythms	8/10 squares
Jesus Freak Hideout	4.5/5 stars
Melodic.net	4/5 stars
New Release Tuesday	4.5/5 stars 5/5 stars
The Phantom Tollbooth	4.5/5 stars

AllMusic's Jared Johnson said that "Between the Dreaming is a fine feather in Norman's cap, a marquee performance for an already-seasoned artist."

CCM Magazine's Christa A. Banister said that "for those who may feel like they want to sit this one out because of what could be perceived as depressing subject matter that hits a little too close to home, there’s significant payoff if you’re up for the challenge. While hope in Christ is found in each song—even in the melancholy closer".

Cross Rhythms' Philip Croft said that "on first impression I have to admit that I was a little disappointed with this album as the songs seemed to lack immediacy. Sure the outstanding, slightly throaty voice was there as were inventive arrangements and production values that we have come to expect but I simply couldn't remember any of the tunes. I decided to persevere though and played the CD several times driving to and from work and it was amazing how the songs grew on me. There is a real lyrical depth to this one that no doubt comes from the experience and growing maturity that Bebo Norman now has. Intelligent pop rock by a man clearly working through some deep spiritual issues."

CCM Magazine's Russ Breimeier said that he "can't help but wonder if some fans might not be disappointed that Norman has downplayed his rootsy side in favor of this bigger pop sound, though the album still remains in step with his body of work. After 2004's slightly disappointing Try, Norman rebounds impressively here, saying that he's discovered newfound artistic confidence as an artist. It clearly shows—I admire this new Bebo Norman enough to call Between his best."

Jesus Freak Hideout's John DiBiase said that the album is "a fine addition to an always impressive catalog of music, Bebo Norman's latest venture Between The Dreaming And The Coming True serves as a fair mix between the infectious melancholy folk pop of Myself When I Am Real, and the more upbeat approach the artist took with Try. Once again taking everyday life experiences, from love to heartache to loss, and balancing it out with heartfelt and meaningful worship, it's hard not to want to say that Mr. Norman's done it again."

Melodic.net's Cor Jan Kat said that they "can surely say that this one is definitely a winner! Great melodic pop with soaring vocals of Bebo. The rootsy folkish sound of his first albums has for the most part been replaced by a modern popsound with hints of Michael W. Smith, Steven Curtis Chapman, Downhere and John Elefante (?To find my way to you?)." In addition, Kat wrote that in the "collaborating on the songwriting and production with Jason Ingram this album has a new and fresh sound. I have to say that I like the ?new and improved? Bebo Norman. There are plenty of songs to enjoy on this album from uptempo poprockers to breathtaking ballads!"

New Release Tuesday's Kevin Davis said that "the songs take you on a journey and the collaboration with Jason Ingram is brilliant."

New Release Tuesday's Grace Thorson said that "the songs are beautiful and perfectly done on it."

New Release Tuesday's Kevin McNeese wrote that the album had "choruses soar, drums thunder, and the piano lets loose drapes of brilliant texture bathing Norman's message with a more vivid light."

The Phantom Tollbooth said that "this is easily Bebo’s best recording and one of the best of the year."

== Track listing ==
All tracks are written by Bebo Norman and Jason Ingram, except where noted.

No.	Title	Writer(s)	Length
1.	"Into the Day"		3:57
2.	"Be My Covering"		4:03
3.	"Time Takes Its Toll on Us"		3:42
4.	"I Know Now"	Norman	4:05
5.	"I Will Lift My Eyes"		4:27
6.	"The Way We Mend"	Dave Barnes & Norman	3:37
7.	"To Find My Way to You"	Norman	4:13
8.	"Bring Me to Life"		4:04
9.	"My Eyes Have Seen Holy"		3:59
10.	"Sunday"		3:39
11.	"Now That You're Gone"		3:25
Total length:			43:11

== Personnel ==
- Bebo Norman – vocals, backing vocals, acoustic guitars, horn arrangements (4)
- Jason Ingram – keyboards, programming, backing vocals, grand piano (5, 9)
- Gabe Scott – accordion
- Shane Keister – grand piano (6)
- Gary Corbett – keyboard programming (6), vibraphone (6)
- Adam Lester – acoustic guitars, electric guitars
- David May – acoustic guitars
- Chris Rodriguez – acoustic guitars (6), electric guitars (6)
- Glenn Rosenstein – slide guitar (6), glockenspiel (6)
- Tony Lucido – bass
- Craig Young – bass (6)
- Ken Lewis – drums, percussion, loops
- Dan Needham – drums (6), percussion (6)
- John Mark Painter – string arrangements, French horn (4), trombone (4), trumpet (4), horn arrangements (4)
- Anthony LaMarchina – cello
- Sarighani Reist – cello
- Monisa Angell – viola
- Kristin Wilkinson – viola, string contractor
- David Angell – violin
- David Davidson – violin
- Pamela Sixfin – violin
- Mary Kathryn Vanosdale – violin

== Production ==
Tracks 1–5 & 7–11

- Producers – Jason Ingram and Bebo Norman
- Engineers – Vance Powell and Rusty Varenkamp
- Assistant Engineers – Allen Ditto and Chad Sylva
- Overdubs and Vocals recorded by Jason Ingram
- Strings recorded by Steve Bishir
- Bass and Drum Editing – Brett Vargason
- Grand piano on Tracks 5 & 9 engineered by Blair Masters

Track 6

- Producer, Overdub and Vocal Engineer – Glenn Rosenstein
- Engineer – Steve Bishir
- Assistant Engineer – Michael Teaney

Other Credits

- Executive Producer – Jordyn Connor
- Mixed by Shane D. Wilson
- Mastered by Richard Dodd
- A&R Production – Michelle Pearson
- Production Coordinator – Traci Bishir
- Art Direction – Stephanie McBrayer and Tim Parker
- Design – Tim Parker
- Photography – Robert Ascroft
- Artwork – Missy Ascroft and Traci Sgrignoli

== Charts ==
Chart (2006)	Peak position
US Billboard 200	187
US Heatseekers Albums (Billboard)	6
US Top Christian Albums (Billboard)	12
