= Myself When I Am Real =

Studio album by Bebo Norman
- Released: September 10, 2002
- Genres: Contemporary Christian music, folk
- Length: 49:13
- Label: Essential
- Producers: Ed Cash, Bebo Norman

Bebo Norman chronology
Big Blue Sky (2001)	Myself When I Am Real (2002)	Try (2004)

Myself When I Am Real is the third studio album by contemporary Christian musician Bebo Norman. The album is the second with Essential Records, and his fourth album overall including his first independent release. This album was released on September 10, 2002, and the producers are Ed Cash and Bebo Norman.

== Critical reception ==
Professional ratings
Review scores
Source	Rating
AllMusic	4.5/5 stars
Christianity Today	4/5 stars
Cross Rhythms	9/10 squares
Jesus Freak Hideout	4.5/5 stars
Melodic.net	3.5/5 stars
New Release Tuesday	5/5 stars
The Phantom Tollbooth	2.5/5 stars 3/5 stars

AllMusic's Steve Losey said that "Myself When I Am Real is an exercise in well-produced, acoustically driven folk-pop that presents itself as a powerful package, eliciting one memorable song after another." In addition, Losey wrote that "Myself When I Am Real is the type of disc that offers one powerful melody after another. It's a gift from a powerful performer sharing his talents with the rest of the world."

CCM Magazine's Lisa Tedder said that "Bebo Norman's Myself When I Am Real finds a middle ground between upbeat pop and introspective storytelling."

Christianity Today's Russ Breimeier said that "Myself When I Am Real suffers a little by allowing a mid-tempo folk shuffle to carry most of the songs on the album, a problem also present on Jennifer Knapp's The Way I Am (is it a coincidence that both artist's third national release have similar titles?). It would have helped if Bebo had included a couple upbeat tracks such as 'The Man Inside' or "I Am." On the other hand, Bebo's songwriting skills have developed greatly; this album includes his finest melodies to date. His usually quiet and somewhat raspy baritone voice absolutely soars as he explores a tenor range that you never knew he was capable of singing, especially on 'Great Light of the World' and 'Our Mystery.' Fans of Bebo's music will want to sing along more than ever on these power choruses. Myself When I Am Real is a good album, no better or worse than his previous works. It's interesting that each project has brought a new songwriting skill to the table. Now if he can just bring those skills together – the melodies of this album, the insight of Ten Thousand Days, and the eclecticism of Big Blue Sky – then Bebo Norman could create the perfect pop album.

Cross Rhythms' Trevor Kirk said that "overall, this is a reversion to the gentler feel of 'Ten Thousand Days' after the poppier sound of 'Big Blue Sky', but what hasn't changed is the obvious talent of the man, and this album showcases it perfectly. Highly recommended."

Jesus Freak Hideout's John DiBiase said that "Bebo goes for broke lyrically on Myself When I Am Real, exposing his heart and soul to listeners, set to infectious rhythms." Furthermore, DiBiase wrote that "the honesty-soaked pop that makes up Myself When I Am Real is what makes this album so solid. Norman fans will eat this one up, while listeners just looking for something a little more transparent and personal will find these catchy tunes being spun in their players over and over."

Melodic.net's Johan Wippsson said that "once again he delivers an album filled with lovely harmonies in a melancholic pop folk package. This time we?re given at least three extraordinary tunes like in ?Everything?, which is an all time top three song from him in my opinion. The sad ?Beautiful you? is another fine one as the catchy ?Falling down?. Those ones are my favourites on the album, but the rest of the album is almost there with a nice consistency all through. His previous albums are really good acoustic based pop in the Cat Stevens league, but this is the best release from him so far. A perfect album now for romantic evenings when fall is here."

New Release Tuesday's Kevin McNeese said that "Bebo Norman pretty much has the formula down pat. To say that he's reached perfection might be too bold, but nothing seems to be going wrong on his third album, Myself When I Am Real." McNeese followed with "Bebo Norman is wonderful at taking angst and directing it towards the heavens, where we are supposed to be bringing our burdens. He presents honesty and an openness with both his faith and his world around him that is simply unmatched in today's music. It's easy to pass on Bebo's music as boring and uninspired, but there are so many layers to both his music and his storytelling that to say that would simply be acknowledging that no time has been spent with the record."

The Phantom Tollbooth's Josh Hurst said that "unfortunately, Norman's third record, Myself When I am Real, finds him just where we left him. He's still poised to make his big move. He's still not working to his full potential. While not at all a poor album, Myself could have been much greater." Hurst wrote that "though, in the case of Myself When I Am Real, the glass is definitely half empty, Norman's well has not totally run dry."

The Phantom Tollbooth's Curt McLey said that "Myself When I am Real seems contrived to such an extent that I have a difficult time listening to it without distraction. As I listen to the songs, recurring visions of teenage girls staring in rapt attention dominate my mind. Facing the stage, hands folded in the classic prayer posture and placed vertically to one side of their face—the young ladies convey a reverence reserved only for the boyfriend who will always be out of reach. Why? Well, because he’s a rock star." Lastly, McLey wrote that "most of the songs on Myself When I am Real--dare I say it--appear to have been intentionally written with mixed meaning. Songs written with layers can be artistically satisfying. But honestly, these songs go too far, which almost makes me a little queasy."

The Phantom Tollbooth's John Wehrle said that "while this album has selected riveting songs, overall the project lacks the potential that Norman has to rock the Christian music world. While the vocals, guitars, and musicianship is solid, the songwriting on the project is lacking."

== Track listing ==
No.	Title	Writer(s)	Length
1.	"Our Mystery"	Cash & Norman	3:33
2.	"Beautiful You"	Cash & Norman	3:48
3.	"Falling Down"	Cash & Norman	3:49
4.	"Great Light of the World"	Norman	4:11
5.	"Where the Trees Stand Still"	Norman	4:38
6.	"Everything"	Cash & Norman	3:08
7.	"Just to Look at You"	Norman	4:59
8.	"Long Way Home"	Norman	5:41
9.	"Under the Sun"	Cash & Norman	3:48
10.	"So Afraid"	Cash & Norman	3:58
11.	"My Love"	Norman	3:46
12.	"Back to Me"	Norman	3:56
Total length:			49:13

== Personnel ==
- Bebo Norman – lead vocals, acoustic guitar
- Carl Herrgesell – keyboards ((1, 2, 4, 6–10, 12), synthesizers ((1, 2, 4, 6–10, 12), Rhodes (1, 2, 4, 6–10, 12), Wurlitzer electric piano (1, 2, 4, 6–10, 12), Moog synthesizer (1, 2, 4, 6–10, 12), Mellotron (1, 2, 4, 6–10, 12), organ (1, 2, 4, 6–10, 12)
- Ed Cash – acoustic guitar (1–4, 6–10, 12), electric guitar (1–4, 6–10, 12), backing vocals (1–4, 6–10, 12), keyboards (3), acoustic piano (4, 7), organ (5, 10), mandolin (5, 8), banjo (6, 9, 12)
- Jerry McPherson – electric guitar (1–4, 6–10)
- Craig Young – bass guitar (1–4, 6–10, 12)
- Byron House – double bass (5)
- Dan Needham – drums (1–4, 6–10, 12), percussion (1–4, 6–10, 12), programming (1–4, 6–10, 12)
- Ed Sweeny – horns (7)
- John Catchings – cello (11)
- Dave Barnes – backing vocals (1)
- Sandra McCracken – backing vocals (5)

== Production ==
- Producer – Ed Cash
- Co-Producer – Bebo Norman
- Executive Producers – Robert Beeson and Jordyn Thomas
- Engineers – Ed Cash and Mike Conley
- Assistant Engineers – Dave Barnes, Scott Cash and Andrew Mendelson.
- Mixing – Ed Cash
- Recorded and Mixed at Ed's (Franklin, TN).
- Mastered by Denny Purcell at Georgetown Masters (Nashville, TN).
- A&R Coordination – Michelle Pearson
- Art Direction – Jordyn Thomas
- Design – Tim Parker
- Cover Art – Tierney L. Malone
- Photography – David Dobson

== Charts ==
Chart (2002)	Peak position
US Billboard 200	114
US Heatseekers	1
US Christian	7
US Internet	8
