= Big Blue Sky (Bebo Norman album) =

Studio album by Bebo Norman
- Released: May 15, 2001
- Genres: Contemporary Christian music, folk
- Length: 46:13
- Label: Essential
- Producers: Ed Cash, Bebo Norman

Bebo Norman chronology
Ten Thousand Days (1999)	Big Blue Sky (2001)	Myself When I Am Real (2002)

Big Blue Sky is the second studio album by contemporary Christian musician Bebo Norman. The album was the first with Essential Records, and his third album overall including his first independent release. This album was released on May 15, 2001, and the producers are Ed Cash and Bebo Norman.

== Critical reception ==
Professional ratings
Review scores
Source	Rating
AllMusic	3/5 stars
CCM Magazine	4/5 stars
Cross Rhythms	8/10 squares
Jesus Freak Hideout	4/5 stars
The Phantom Tollbooth	4.5/5 stars

AllMusic's Jonathan Widran said that Bebo Norman "employs his cool sandpaper voice (very similar to Bob Carlisle, as far as CCM genre comparisons go) on a mix of up-tempo pop/rock anthems, inspirational reflections, and gentle ballads." In addition, Widran wrote that the album is "Mostly this is straightforward pop, but there's a bit of a blues influence throughout".

CCM Magazine's David McCreary called the album a "brilliant new offering". Furthermore, McCreary wrote that "as long as his robust baritone and poignant lyrics rule the day, Norman’s forays into new facets of his craft will continue taking him to newheights. In the meantime, Big Blue Sky upholds the standard of sincerity, sensibility and prime musicianship his fans have come to expect."

Christianity Today's Russ Breimeier said that "for the record, I believe there's something critical to say about every album because it's impossible to please everyone. Big Blue Sky may be a 'louder' album than Ten Thousand Days was, but it will still be too mellow an album for some people, and possibly not mellow enough for purists looking for just Bebo and his acoustic guitar. The songs are all excellent, though some will say they're generally not as intellectually profound as past songs such as 'The Hammer Holds.' Also, I've already talked to some who have a problem with Bebo including a love song, 'You Surround Me,' on the same album as 'Perhaps She'll Wait for Me,' which is about coping with loneliness as a single. These are all valid observations, I suppose, but it's also nitpicking for what many will agree to be an excellent follow-up from Bebo Norman, showing that the quality of his first album was no accident. Because he's demonstrated that he can consistently write solid pop songs and that he's also capable of musical growth, Bebo's future as a songwriter is bound to be filled with blue skies."

Cross Rhythms' Lins Honeyman said that the album is "Spontaneous yet tight, simple but profound, there is more to come from this man."

Jesus Freak Hideout's John DiBiase said that "with each song and each album, Norman is continually reaching into the depths of the listener's soul lyrically, and musically further securing himself as a talented pop figure in the Christian music scene."

The Phantom Tollbooth's Glenn McCarty said that "Few and more delightful are those underexposed artists, whose assaulting marketing scheme doesn't involve cramming them down our throats, constantly reminding us just how wonderful their artist is, instead allowing us to discover at our own pace their talents. Such is the case with Bebo Norman, a refreshingly adept songwriter whose understated gifts are nowhere more evident than his new album, Big Blue Sky." Additionally, McCarty wrote that "although Big Blue Sky is less a folk album than an acoustic pop/rock album, this style does nothing except bring different musical options to Norman's signature sound. Most certainly Norman's most mature effort to date, Big Blue Sky is a warm inviting album that begs a second listen as much for its stellar songwriting as for its spunk and enthusiasm." Lastly, McCarty noted that "Big Blue Sky reveals Norman expanding his musical horizons, reaching into pop/rock territory, yet still grounded by solid songwriting instincts and poised performances."

== Track listing ==
No.	Title	Writer(s)	Length
1.	"I Am"	Norman	4:09
2.	"Cover Me"	Norman	4:40
3.	"You Surround Me"	Cash & Norman	4:32
4.	"Sons and Daughters"	Norman	4:48
5.	"Perhaps She'll Wait"	Norman	3:00
6.	"Tip of My Heart"	Norman	4:24
7.	"Underneath"	Cash & Norman	3:55
8.	"Break Me Through"	Norman	5:18
9.	"Big Blue Sky"	Cash & Norman	3:00
10.	"All That I Have Sown"	Cash & Norman	5:18
11.	"Where You Are"	Norman	3:09
Total length:			46:13

== Personnel ==
- Bebo Norman – lead vocals, acoustic guitar (1, 2, 5, 6, 7, 9, 11), electric guitar (4), backing vocals (4, 9)
- Ed Cash – keyboards (1, 2, 4, 6, 7, 8), backing vocals (1–9), "deep" drums (1), acoustic guitar (2, 3, 4, 6, 7, 9), electric guitar (2, 3, 6–9), drum programming (2), acoustic piano (4), Rhodes (5, 10), Ebow bass (5), percussion (6, 9), tambourine (7), pulse synthesizer (10)
- Mark Stallings – Minimoog (1), acoustic piano (3, 6, 7, 10), Hammond B3 organ (6, 7, 9)
- Scott Cash – electric guitar (1)
- David Johnson – steel guitar (4, 10)
- Kevin Grantt – bass (1–4, 7, 9)
- Byron House – bass (10)
- Garett Buell – drums (1, 3, 4, 6, 7, 9), percussion (1–4, 8), marimba (3), programming (8), shaker (9)
- Rick Murray – drums (2)
- John Catchings – cello (10), string arrangements (10)
- Monisa Angell – viola (10)
- David Angell – violin (10)
- David Davidson – violin (10)
- Julie Clark – harmony vocals (4, 10)
- Jill Phillips – harmony vocals (10)

== Production ==
- Producer – Ed Cash
- Co-Producer – Bebo Norman
- Executive Producers – Robert Beeson, Jordyn Thomas and Cliff Young.
- Engineers – Ed Cash and Ben Wisch
- Assistant Engineer – Scott Cash
- Recorded at The Farm (Marvin, NC).
- Strings on Track 10 recorded by Paula Wolak at Media Mix (Nashville, TN).
- Mark Stallings overdubs recorded by Joe Khulmann at Studio East (Charlotte, NC).
- Tracks 1, 2 & 4-11 mixed by Ben Wisch at Recording Arts (Nashville, TN).
- Track 3 mixed by Ed Cash at The Farm.
- Mix Assistant – Grant Green
- Mastered by Bob Boyd at Ambient Digital (Houston, TX).
- A&R Coordination – Michelle Pearson
- Art Direction – Robert Beeson, Bebo Norman and Jordyn Thomas.
- Design – Tim Parker and Ron Roark
- Photography – David Dobson

== Charts ==
Chart (2001)	Peak position
US Billboard 200	141
US Heatseekers	4
US Christian	8
US Internet	5
