= Ocean (Bebo Norman album) =

Studio album by Bebo Norman
- Released: September 28, 2010
- Genre: Contemporary Christian music, folk
- Length: 43:08
- Label: BEC
- Producer: Jason Ingram; Bebo Norman

Bebo Norman chronology
Bebo Norman (2008)	Ocean (2010)	Lights of Distant Cities (2012)

Singles from Ocean
- 1. "Here Goes" Released: August 31, 2010

Ocean is the seventh studio album by contemporary Christian musician Bebo Norman. The album is the third with BEC Recordings, which was his second studio album with the label, and his tenth album overall including his first independent release. This album was released on September 28, 2010, and the producers are Jason Ingram and Bebo Norman.

== Critical reception ==
Professional ratings
Review scores
Source	Rating
AllMusic	3.5/5 stars
CCM Magazine	4/5 stars
Christian Broadcasting Network	4/5 spins
The Christian Manifesto	3.75 stars on a 5 point scale
Christian Music Zine	B−
Christianity Today	3/5 stars
Cross Rhythms	8/10 squares
Jesus Freak Hideout	3.5/5 stars
Louder Than The Music	4/5 stars
New Release Tuesday	5/5 stars

AllMusic's James Christopher Monger said that "Ocean doesn’t deviate too far from that formula, and while the tone is a bit more mellow than on previous releases, Norman remains an engaging, honest, and original voice in a genre that’s not necessarily known for posing questions." Monger wrote that "Ocean feels both familiar and free, and despite its slick production, manages to stand out from the rest of the pack."

CCM Magazine's Matt Conner said that "Ocean is Bebo Norman's finest effort." Conner wrote that "Ocean explores the deeper waters of faith in the most compelling ways."

Christian Broadcasting Network's Hannah Goodwyn said that "the album's got a personal feel to it that just pulls you into a musical conversation, one where Bebo is pouring out his soul, all while encouraging yours." Goodwyn wrote that the album goes "deeper than a feel-good album, Ocean beckons you into the depths of God's love."

The Christian Manifesto's Lydia Akinola said that "Ocean has its high points and its lower points. While I enjoyed each track, compared to the amazing quality of the aforementioned standout tracks 'I Hope You See Jesus', 'Ocean' and 'Everything I Hoped You'd Be', the others always quite hit the mark. This was my first true experience of Bebo Norman, so I may not be the best judge. A little more consistency would take his work further. However, I know he has the heart of the worshipper, and gift of writing truly inspiring lyrics. With these tools on his side, I am sure that when I have the privilege of listening to the eighth project, it will be able to move from my head to my heart." Akinola wrote that "listening to Ocean, I cannot help but slow down and just … contemplate. Packed full with introspection, this folk-rock album wants to live in my mind and cultivate there."

Christian Music Zine's Tyler Hess said that "if you’re looking for some contemplative folk rock about water and its relation to God and man, then oh boy we have found the album for you! You’ll get a little guitar action, a little key action and a whole bunch of reflection."

Christianity Today's Jeremy V. Jones said that "Ocean is primarily a collection of radio anthems and worship ballads, and tracks such as 'Everything I'd Hope You'd Be' and 'God of My Everything'" Jones wrote that "the glossy production grows predictable, and as a whole, the project suffers from repetitive formula much like, well, radio playlists."

Cross Rhythms' Gareth Hills said that "the 10th album from the well-established singer/songwriter, wears the CCM label a little too well - the top-notch production, the reverb-drenched guitars and anthemic, though not too original choruses. Yet despite the slick production, is a wealth of accomplished songwriting - Norman seems to excel at that rare art of capturing a genuine outpouring of emotion". Hills wrote that "'Ocean' is a great example of raw, honest songwriting, and the many layers found within will reward repeated listening."

Jesus Freak Hideout's Jen Rose said that "though his last album was less-than-impressive, Ocean turns out to be a welcome return to form that has its share of good moments. It doesn't match up to the standards established with Between the Dreaming... or bring back the folksy storyteller warmth of his early work, but it is a nicely done pop record overall."

Louder Than The Music's Jono Davies said that "Bebo, in the press release for this album, said "Still, I find myself looking up and asking, 'Who am I outside of music and beyond being a husband and father? How do I hide myself in who Christ is rather than relying on my own identity in the real world?". This is what his new album does, it asks those questions in the songs, yet at the same time tries to give some answers that Bebo has come up with for these situations. You could worry this is another soft rock middle of the road acoustic worship album, but if you look closer at each song, Bebo has taken the time to craft away and make these songs more than the genre they fall into. These songs are solid, acoustic, rock, worship songs, and are well written by a talented songwriter."

New Release Tuesday's Kevin Davis said that he "can’t help but give this album a perfect score for message and music. Musically and lyrically this is literally a perfect album. Thanks so much Bebo for writing and singing some of the deepest and most meaningful songs I’ve ever heard. Pick up Ocean and you won't regret it. For me this is a 5 star album and my top overall album of 2010."

== Track listing ==
All tracks are written by Bebo Norman and Jason Ingram, except where noted.

No.	Title	Writer(s)	Length
1.	"Everything I Hoped You'd Be"		3:45
2.	"Here Goes"	Brandon Heath, Ingram and Norman	3:24
3.	"God of My Everything"		3:33
4.	"Could You Ever Look at Me"	Norman	3:30
5.	"We Fall Apart"		3:51
6.	"Ocean"		4:07
7.	"Sing Over Me"		4:14
8.	"The Middle"	Norman	5:17
9.	"I Hope You See Jesus"	Norman and Laura Story	4:20
10.	"Remember Us"		3:36
11.	"God of My Everything" ([Radio Version])		3:31
Total length:			43:08

== Personnel ==
- Bebo Norman – vocals, backing vocals, acoustic guitars
- Jason Ingram – keyboards, acoustic piano, programming, acoustic guitars, backing vocals
- Ben Shive – keyboards, acoustic piano
- Adam Lester – acoustic guitars, electric guitars, bass (1–10)
- James Gregory – bass (11)
- Paul Mabury – drums (1–10), programming
- Ben Phillips – drums (11)
- Chris Carmichael – strings (11), string arrangements (11)
- Laura Story – backing vocals (9)

== Production ==
- Brandon Ebel – executive producer
- Tyson Paoletti – executive producer
- Jason Ingram – producer
- Bebo Norman – producer
- Shane D. Wilson – mixing at Pentavarit (Nashville, Tennessee)
- Erin Kaus – mix assistant
- Lani Crump – mix coordinator
- Andrew Mendelson – mastering at Georgetown Masters (Nashville, Tennessee)
- Ryan Clark – art direction, design
- Laura Dart – photography

== Charts ==
Chart (2010)	Peak position
US Billboard 200	184
US Top Christian Albums (Billboard)	15
US Current Albums (Billboard)	163
