= Mitch Dane =

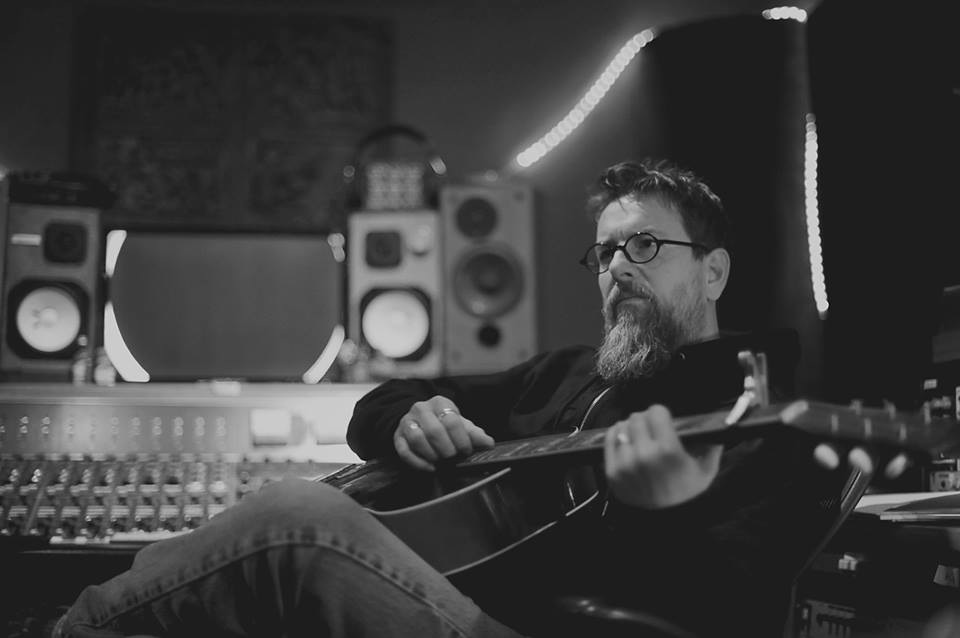

Background information
- Born: April 6, 1967 (age 59); Cape Girardeau, Missouri
- Genres: Indie rock, singer songwriter
- Occupations: Record producer, songwriter, musician
- Instruments: Piano, guitar, Musical saw, synthesizer
- Years active: 1983–present
- Website: sputniksound.com

Mitch Dane is an American record producer, musician, and songwriter. He owns the recording studio Sputnik Sound with Vance Powell. He has worked with artists such as Jars of Clay, JJ Heller, Brandon Heath, Jetty Rae, Sonia Leigh, The Blind Boys of Alabama, The Young Fables, Ole Lonesome, Swearingen and Kelli, and Kenny Foster.

Dane won a Grammy Award for his work on The Eleventh Hour by Jars of Clay and has received four additional Grammy nominations for his work on other albums. He also received ASCAP "Most Played Song" award for "Nothing Without You", which he co-wrote with Bebo Norman.

== Personal life ==
Dane grew up in Cape Girardeau, Missouri, where he spent his childhood making playhouses and treehouses. At the age of 14, he was involved in a motorcycle accident that left him clinically dead for several minutes before he was revived. The accident injured his esophagus, trachea, and vocal cords, leaving him unable to speak for two years, a period he later said was when he "learned to really listen." His injuries required 33 surgeries, including the removal of one vocal cord, which contributed to his distinctive voice. For the next 15 years, he used the story of his accident in his musical performances before transitioning into audio engineering.

Dane is married with two children and has lived in Nashville since 1989.

== Musical influences ==
As a producer, Dane said, "I like to collect the best aspects of every genre of music and bring them together in hybrid productions." Referring to his childhood affinity for building treehouses, Dane stated that he took a similar approach when designing his recording studio, aiming to create a comfortable space for artists. His demeanor has been described as "calm and focused."

== Selected production credits ==
As of December 2018, Mitch Dane has produced and/or engineered more than 275 projects. Below is a selection of his production credits:

Artist	Year	Album	Producer	Engineer
Audrey And Hugh	2020	Sisterman	check	
Towne	2019	TBD	check	check
SisterMan	2019	Lilly White Parade	check	check
Ole Lonesome	2019	Turn It On	check	check
Heathen Sons	2019	Born to Lose	check	check
Swearingen and Kelli	2018	Cold-Hearted Truth	check	check
Sonia Leigh	2018	Mad Hatter	check	check
The Young Fables	2017	Old Songs	check	check
Kenny Foster	2017	Deep Cuts	check	check
Jetty Rae	2016	Can't Curse the Free	check	check
Man Underground	2016	Couples Therapy	check	check
The Snow Globes	2016	Snowed In	check	check
Rob Blackledge	2016	Now	check	check
Reuben Bidez	2016	Turning to Wine	check	check
Treva Blomquist	2015	The Risk & The Gift	check	check
Ryan Scott Travis	2015	The Guadalupe Breakdown	check	check
Victor & Penny	2015	Electricity	check	check
Giles Blankenship	2015	Home	check	check
Daniel Johnson	2015	Promo Videos	check	check
Katie Barnette	2015	Sputnik Sessions	check	check
Mr. & Mrs. Something	2015	Setting Sail	check	check
Coyote Keene	2015	Blue Skies & Red Wine	check	check
MaryMac	2015	MaryMac	check	check
Eric Peters	2015	Sputnik Sessions	check	check
The Hummingbirds	2015	13 Days	check	check
Sean Hale	2015	Sputnik Sessions	check	check
Lauren Light	2015	Sputnik Sessions	check	check
Africa Worship Band	2015	Sputnik Sessions	check	check
Unspoken	2015	Unplugged	check	check
JJ Heller	2015	Sputnik Sessions	check	check
Hannah Miller	2015	Hannah Miller	check	check
Holly Spears	2014	Boots and Bling	check	check
Ryan Horne	2014	Vanilla Lightning	check	check
Kyle Matthews	2014	Be Here Now	check	check
Christopher Williams	2014	The City Makes The Man	check	check
So Long Solo	2014	So Long Solo	check	check
Chris Regan	2014	All Things Beautiful	check	check
Andrew Cooper	2014	EP	check	check
Ronnie Dennis	2014	We are Satellites	check	check
Jessi McKinnon	2014	Dancing Again	check	check
Humming House	2014	Revelries	check	check
We Are The Monks	2014	We Are The Monks	check	check
The Gray Havens	2013	Fire and Stone	check	check
The Pedal Stills	2013	Static Queen	check	check
Mare Wakefield	2013	Poet on the Moon	check	check
Humming House	2013	Single	check	check
Carrie Moeller	2013	Single	check	check
Madison Grigsby	2013	Joie De Vivre	check	check
Holly Spears	2013	Single & EP	check	check
YouPlusMe	2013	Little Beginnings EP	check	check
Jesse Macht	2013	Single	check	check
The Snow Globes	2013	The All Living Things	check	check
The Black Cadillacs	2013	Singles	check	check
Christie Cook	2013	Every Good Thing	check	check
Trish Ivy	2013	Cotton Country EP	check	check
Abernathy	2013	Rococo	check	check
Dave Gerhartz	2013	Leaving the Family Behind	check	check
Josh Hilliker	2013	Shadows or Sunlight	check	check
Hannah Miller	2013	Sputnik Sessions	check	check
August York	2013	Swimming Upstream	check	check
Little Radar	2013	Souvenirs	check	check
Ravenhill	2013	Soul	check	check
Ruby Amanfu	2012	Sputnik Sessions	check	check
Elizabeth Busch	2012	Redemption's Mystery	check	check
The Billis	2012	Singles	check	check
Dean Guevara	2012	Songs of Hope and Devotion	check	check
Matthew Clark	2012	Bright Came the Word from His Mouth	check	check
Ryan Horne	2012	Silent Night (A Christmas EP)	check	check
High Street Hymns	2012	Love Lives Again	check	check
Brad Jones	2012	Oh Well My Love Farewell EP	check	check
Brian Fraaza	2012	The Shadows of the Light	check	check
Colleen Nixon	2012	Lake Ella's Sky	check	check
Rachel Belman	2012	The Call	check	check
Dustin Ah Kuoi	2012	Dustin Ah Kuoi	check	check
Humming House	2012	Singles	check	check
The Kicks	2012	Tonight Everything Changes	check	check
Sean Forest	2012	Live Love Lead	check	check
Brandon Heath	2012	Give Me Your Eyes – Acoustic Sessions	check	check
Andy Needham Band	2012	Lifted High	check	check
Hillary McBride	2011	Sputnik Sessions	check	check
Stephanie Day	2011	Morning Came	check	check
High Street Hymns	2011	Christmas EP	check	check
Jenny & Tyler	2011	Open Your Doors	check	check
Scott Smith	2011	EP	check	check
Holly Spears	2011	Christmas EP	check	check
Stephanie Day	2011	Single	check	check
Eddie Gilbert	2011	EP	check	check
Micah Michelle	2011	Sharpened in Time	check	check
Carrie Moeller	2011	Sending One Up (EP)	check	check
Zach Ellsworth	2011	Notes on Becoming	check	check
Blake Aaron	2011	EP	check	check
JJ Heller	2011	Deeper	check	check
Shaun Groves	2011	Third World Symphony	check	check
Christopher Williams	2011	Stone Water Wood Light	check	check
Humming House	2011	Humming House	check	check
After the Chase	2011	You Are My Child	check	check
Ryan Horne	2011	The Whistler & The Majestic	check	check
Faith Gilmore	2010	Bold as Lions	check	check
The Kicks	2010	Sputnik Sessions	check	check
Eddie Gilbert	2010	Singles	check	check
Caitlin Nicole Eadie	2010	Gravity	check	check
JJ Heller	2010	When I'm With You	check	check
The Young International	2010	The Young International (EP)	check	check
Ryan Corn	2010	Wonderful Things	check	check
Rachel Barrentine	2010	Departure	check	check
Compelled	2010	The Fight	check	check
Sarah Kelly	2010	Midnight Sun	check	check
Jars of Clay	2010	The Shelter	check	check
Reilly	2010	Around the World	check	check
Raining and OK	2010	Living Like a Ghost	check	check
The Speedbumps	2010	The Moon is Down	check	check
Farewell Flight	2009	Lonesome Traveler	check	check
Levi Weaver	2009	The Letters of Dr. Kurt Gödel	check	check
Florez	2009	El Diablo	check	check
Doc Possom	2009	Single	check	check
This & That	2009	Volume 2	check	check
Julianna Zobrist	2009	The Tree Remix	check	check
The Kicks	2009	The Rise of King Richie	check	check
Obadiah Parker	2009	The Siren and the Saint	check	check
Lara Landon	2009	Beloved	check	check
Then There Was Two	2009	Love Lies in Jealousy	check	check
Zach Ellsworth	2009	Notes on Becoming	check	check
Brandan McCarthy	2009	To The Moon (EP)	check	check
Jocelyn Scofield	2009	A Witty Girl	check	check
FFH	2009	Wide Open Spaces	check	check
Jon Troast	2009	A Person and a Heart	check	check
JJ Heller	2009	Deeper	check	check
Sarah Hart	2008	Road to Ohio	check	check
Jon Troast	2008	I Want to be President	check	check
Jon Troast	2008	Living Room	check	check
Branden McCarthy	2008	Yellow Roses	check	check
Jars of Clay	2008	Long Fall Back To Earth	check	check
Jerry Chapman	2008	Sweet Impossible	check	check
JJ Heller	2008	Painted Red	check	check
Adam Agin	2008	Foundation (EP)	check	check
Julianna Zobrist	2008	The Tree (EP)	check	check
Trish Ivy	2008	Requiem	check	check
Marvin and Gentry	2008	Master Plan	check	check
Colleen McCarron	2008	Love is in the Details	check	check
Blake Aaron	2007	Love in Different Lights	check	check
Dean Guevara	2007	Pierce the Night	check	check
Caedmon's Call	2007	Overdressed	check	check
Farewell Flight	2007	Sound.Color.Motion	check	check
Nate Allman	2007	Dream for Free	check	check
Jars of Clay	2007	Christmas Songs	check	check
Midtown Worship Band	2007	The Midtown Project Vol.1	check	check
Christopher Williams	2007	Sweet Redemption	check	check
Justin McRoberts	2007	Deconstruction	check	check
JJ Heller	2007	Pretty and the Plain	check	check
JJ Heller	2007	Wake Up The World (Christmas EP)	check	check
Nathan Shaver	2007	These Words Aren't Working	check	check
Hannah Miller	2007	Into the Black	check	check
Sarah Kelly	2007	Born to Worship	check	check
Matt Thien	2007	Desert Dry (EP)	check	check
Jeromy Diebler	2007	Where Do I Go From Here	check	check
Josh Rosenthal	2007	Renaissance	check	check
