= Christmas... From the Realms of Glory =

Studio album by Bebo Norman
- Released: October 7, 2007
- Studio: Emack Studio (Franklin, Tennessee); The Smoakstack (Nashville, Tennessee); Little Hollywood Hills (Brentwood, Tennessee)
- Genre: Contemporary Christian music, folk
- Length: 43:01
- Label: BEC
- Producer: Jason Ingram; Bebo Norman; Rusty Varenkamp

Bebo Norman chronology
Great Light of the World: The Best of Bebo Norman (2007)	Christmas... From the Realms of Glory (2007)	Bebo Norman (2008)

Christmas... From the Realms of Glory is the first holiday album by contemporary Christian musician Bebo Norman. The album is the first with BEC Recordings, and his eighth album overall including his first independent release. This album was released on October 7, 2007, and the producers are Jason Ingram, Bebo Norman and Rusty Varenkamp.

== Critical reception ==
Professional ratings
Review scores
Source	Rating
Jesus Freak Hideout	4.5/5 stars

Jesus Freak Hideout's John DiBiase said that "Bebo Norman's warm and intimate voice is a perfect match for the Christmas season. His first official venture singing original and all-time favorites is a triumph and easily among the greatest CCM offerings in the Christmas genre to date. As this particular Christmas looks to bring with it some truly memorable projects, consider Bebo Norman's Christmas... From The Realms Of Glory to mark one of the first grand achievements for 2007."

== Track listing ==
No.	Title	Writer(s)	Length
1.	"Come and Worship"	James Montgomery	4:08
2.	"Joy to the World"	Isaac Watts	3:42
3.	"Born to Die"	Jason Ingram and Bebo Norman	3:36
4.	"What Child Is This"		4:06
5.	"Angels" (interlude)		1:50
6.	"Go Tell It on the Mountain"		3:30
7.	"Silver Bells"	Jay Livingston and Ray Evans	3:49
8.	"Christmas Time Is Here" (featuring Amy Grant)	Ingram and Norman	2:57
9.	"Have Yourself a Merry Little Christmas"		3:16
10.	"The Rebel Jesus"	Jackson Browne	3:47
11.	"O Come, O Come Emmanuel"		2:36
12.	"Great Light of the World" (interlude)	Norman	1:20
13.	"Mary's Prayer"	Norman	4:24
Total length:			43:01

== Personnel ==
- Bebo Norman – lead and backing vocals acoustic guitar, arrangements (1, 2, 4, 6, 9, 11)
- Jason Ingram – acoustic piano, programming, acoustic guitar, backing vocals, arrangements (1, 2, 4, 6, 9, 11)
- Paul Moak – Wurlitzer electric piano, Hammond B3 organ, pump organ, toy piano, acoustic guitar, electric guitars, pedal steel guitar, banjitar, vibraphone, glockenspiel
- Gabe Scott – acoustic guitar, pedal steel guitar, banjo, dobro, accordion, hammered dulcimer
- Matt Pierson – bass
- Ken Lewis – drums, percussion
- David Henry – cello
- Chris Carmichael – viola, violin
- Amy Grant – guest vocals (8)

== Production ==
- Tyson Paoletti – A&R
- Jason Ingram – producer
- Bebo Norman – producer
- Rusty Varenkamp – producer, recording, mixing (5, 12, 13)
- Tom Laune – mixing (1–4, 6–11)
- Dan Shike – mastering at Tone and Volume Mastering (Nashville, Tennessee)
- Traci Bishir – production assistant
- Siesta – artwork, design
- Anthony Saint James – photography
- Chad Sylva – set up assistant

== Charts ==
Chart (2007)	Peak position
US Top Christian Albums (Billboard)	35
US Holiday Albums (Billboard)	5
