= The Fabric of Verse =

Studio album by Bebo Norman
- Released: 1996
- Genre: Christian Contemporary-Folk
- Length: 48:22
- Label: Anchor
- Producer: Ed Cash

Bebo Norman chronology
The Fabric of Verse (1996)	Ten Thousand Days (1999)

The Fabric of Verse is the first Independent album by Christian Contemporary-Folk musician Bebo Norman. The album was his debut and his only album released through Anchor Records prior to his work with Watershed Records. This album was released in 1996 and was produced by Ed Cash.

== Track listing ==
Tracklist
No.	Title	Writer(s)	Length
1.	"The Man Inside"	Bebo Norman	3:13
2.	"Picture of Things"	Norman	4:31
3.	"Walking Away"	Norman	3:49
4.	"The Hammer Holds"	Norman	4:57
5.	"Curtis Creek"	Norman	3:41
6.	"A Page Is Turned"	Norman	5:19
7.	"Wash Me Clean"	Norman	3:18
8.	"Lake City"	Norman	5:08
9.	"Somewhere Past the Quiet"	Norman	5:41
10.	"Angel Fire"	Norman	5:08
11.	"On the Divide"	Norman	3:37
Total length:			48:22
