= Blimey Cow =

YouTube channel/television show

- Blimey Cow logo
- Born: Josh Taylor; Jordan Taylor; Kelli Taylor; Sara Taylor

YouTube information
- Channels: Blimey Cow; Jordan Taylor
- Years active: 2005–present
- Genres: Christian comedy; commentary; sketch comedy; video blog
- Subscribers: 495 thousand (Blimey Cow); 135 thousand (Jordan Taylor)
- Views: 130 million (Blimey Cow); 17.3 million (Jordan Taylor)
- Last updated: August 2, 2025
- Website: http://www.blimeycow.com

Blimey Cow is an internet comedy channel based in Nashville, Tennessee, created in 2005 by brothers Josh and Jordan Taylor, most famous for the series Messy Mondays. Produced by and starring the Taylor brothers, Josh's wife Kelli, and Jordan's wife Sara, the channel targets the idiosyncrasies of conservative Christianity, youth group, romantic relationships, homeschooling, politics, and social media. Blimey Cow experienced a major surge in popularity after the video "Seven Lies About Homeschoolers" went viral. Musician Derek Webb, Colin Kimble of As Cities Burn, and John Reuben have all made appearances on Blimey Cow after discovering the channel. In addition to these appearances, the channel has received attention from musician Michael Gungor, authors Lew Rockwell and Thomas Woods, and various media outlets and programs such as The 700 Club, The Christian Post, The Huffington Post, Metro, Today, and WKRN-TV.

== History ==
=== Early history ===
The brothers began filming videos in 2005. At a young age, their father taught them how to shoot videos and use special effects in an effort to demonstrate that movie violence, which had frightened the brothers, was fake. The brothers initially filmed using a simple home video camera, and posted their videos on Google Video, which eventually merged with YouTube when Google acquired the latter. According to Josh, Jordan's favorite word at the time was "cow", and the brothers had a friend who frequently said "blimey", so the words were merged to create "Blimey Cow". Influenced by The Office, Napoleon Dynamite, and Christopher Guest, the Taylor brothers adopted a mockumentary style. In 2007, Colin Cimble of the band As Cities Burn appeared in an episode of the show Jordan's Messyges. The activity by the brothers declined once Josh started college and met his future wife Kelli, and Jordan finished high school.

=== Re-launch and early popularity ===
In 2011, Josh had married Kelli and Jordan entered college. Josh convinced Jordan to create one video every week. They launched this new series, featuring Jordan addressing various topics, under the title of "Messy Mondays", modeled after a previous series, Jordan's Messyges. Messy Mondays debuted on August 29, 2011, with the video "New School Year". A few minor hits emerged, specifically "The One About Mission Trips", "3 Types of Churches", "10 Ways to Get a Girl to Like You", and "The Truth About Youth Group". The video "The One About Mission Trips" critiqued short-term missions and suggested that the money raised could fund longer-term missions. Josh stated that while it generated some negative feedback from state-side viewers, missionaries in other countries praised the video for addressing this issue. The videos "3 Types of Churches", "10 Ways to Get a Girl to Like You", and "The Truth About Youth Group" each brought in about 3,000 views per week.

=== Viral breakthrough ===
On January 16, 2012, Blimey Cow released the Messy Mondays video "Seven Lies About Homeschoolers". The video received over one million views in under a week. It is currently at 2.3 million views. In February, the Christian Broadcasting Network picked up the video, interviewing Jordan Taylor on The 700 Club during a segment on homeschooling. On April 24, 2012, historian and author Thomas Woods interviewed Josh Taylor while guest hosting The Peter Schiff Show. Two days later, author, former Congressional staffer Lew Rockwell posted the homeschooling video on his website LewRockwell.com, and in July he interviewed Josh Taylor on his podcast The Lew Rockwell Show. Following the success of the homeschooling video, Blimey Cow formed a YouTube partnership and signed up for Google advertising to generate revenue.

=== Subsequent success ===
On August 2, 2012, the Korean edition of Christian Today noted the Messy Mondays video "10 Ways to Get the Right Guy to Like You", uploaded on January 23, 2012, in an online article on Christian dating.

The following year, on February 3, Blimey Cow released another highly successful Messy Mondays video, "How to Write a Worship Song (In 5 Minutes or Less)". By February 4, the video surged to the top five most popular currently watched videos on YouTube, and by February 7, the video garnered 213,000 views. The episode was written and conceived by Canadian musician Garrett Vandenberg. The video received highly positive feedback, including Twitter shout-outs from individuals in the music industry. Jeff Cruz of 89.7 WMHK said the video was "remarkably accurate and incredibly sad at same time." Post-rock musician Michael Gungor called the video "brilliant" and said he would have to see more of Blimey Cow's material. Singer-songwriter Derek Webb stated that the video "is as funny as it is true. Which makes it not funny." This flurry of Twitter activity caught the attention of The Christian Post, which published a story about the video on February 7, 2013.

On March 24, Derek Webb made a guest appearance in the video "The Top 15 Christian Cliches". The following day, WKRN-TV posted an article about the Taylors and their success.

On April 29, 2013, Blimey Cow released the video "Why I Hate Going to Graduations", about which The Huffington Post posted a short article the following day. The next week, the members of the band Pompton Lakes appeared in the opening and closing scenes for the video "Ten Things You Should Never Say to a Guy".

The video "I Like You in Real Life (But Not on the Internet)", uploaded on May 26, attracted the attention of several media outlets. Mashable posted a short story on the video on May 28, and on May 30, Today host Willie Geist mentioned the channel while discussing social media etiquette with business woman Randi Zuckerberg. On June 5, 2013, Metro based an article on the video, and interviewed Josh on the issue of internet behavior.

In May 2017, Christian rapper John Reuben made an appearance on the channel.

== Kickstarter campaign and BCAN ==
In March and April 2013, Blimey Cow successfully ran a Kickstarter campaign to raise money for equipment to begin an audio podcast. The project reached its $1,700 goal in 40 minutes. By the end of the campaign, nearly $17,000 had been raised and the plan evolved into what was called the Blimey Cow Audio Network, or BCAN. Financial supporters of the Kickstarter received Blimey Cow merchandise, such as T-shirts, stickers and special recordings.

== Personal biographies ==
=== Jordan Taylor ===
Jordan grew up attending small churches with his family, and he and Josh involved themselves in youth groups and Vacation Bible School, experiences which inspire much of the content on their channel. After homeschooling through highschool, Jordan attended Cumberland University before transferring to Trevecca Nazarene University, where he majored in English with a creative writing minor. While at Cumberland, he rode in the university cycling team, and now cycles as a hobby. Jordan started his own YouTube channel in 2015, which has 1.48 lakh subscribers as of July 2021. On June 26, 2015, he released an album, Long Drive. In May 2017, Jordan married Sara Bonham. In 2024, the couple gave birth to their first son, Owen Wright Taylor.

=== Josh Taylor ===
When Josh was a teenager, he wrote some reviews for the Christian music website Jesus Freak Hideout. In addition to his writing and photo work on the website, he and the website founder, John DiBiase, created a mockumentary series entitled "The Hideout" which fictionally portrayed the office life at Jesus Freak Hideout.

Josh holds a Bachelor of Science degree in mass communications with a focus on television and radio. From 2009 to 2010 while in college, he hosted a nightly radio show The Evening Blend on the now defunct 89.1 FM WNAZ. Upon graduating, he worked as a master control operator for WHTN before taking on a job, helping his father as a patent artist for local attorneys. He now does Blimey Cow full-time. Josh also does planning for Disney World vacations, and runs the podcasts The Inner Tube and Who Would Build the Roads with co-host Kevin McCreary. Several of his characters on the channel include: College Josh, Twitter Troll Josh, Youth Pastor Josh and liberalist Josh.

=== Kelli Taylor ===
Kelli grew up in a family of five and was homeschooled from third grade on. When she first met Josh, Kelli says that he acted "very dorky" and gave her one of the joke CDs that he and Jordan made. In addition to her work with Blimey Cow, Kelli enjoys writing, photography, cooking, planning, movies, friends, and food, and maintains a blog, "Currently Kelli". She and Josh have three sons: Isaac, Eliot, and Shiloh.

== Personnel ==
- Jordan Taylor – host for Messy Mondays, Jordan's Messyges, and #AskJordan; actor, writer, director
- Josh Taylor – primary writer, director and editor, actor; co-host for "The Inner Tube" and "Who Would Build The Roads"
- Kelli Taylor – writer, editor, director, actress
- Kevin McCreary – audio production, occasional actor, co-host for "The Inner Tube" and "Who Would Build The Roads"

=== Supporting personnel ===
- Amy Bonham – actress, occasional director
- Sara Taylor – actress
- Garrett Vandenberg – music composition
