= Ten Thousand Days (album) =

Studio album by Bebo Norman
- Released: September 14, 1999
- Genres: Contemporary Christian music, folk
- Length: 54:46
- Label: Watershed
- Producers: Ed Cash, Bebo Norman

Bebo Norman chronology
The Fabric of Verse (1996)	Ten Thousand Days (1999)	Big Blue Sky (2001)

Ten Thousand Days is the first studio album by contemporary Christian musician Bebo Norman. The album was his only album released on Watershed Records, and his second album overall including his first independent release. This album was released on September 14, 1999, and the producers are Ed Cash and Bebo Norman.

== Critical reception ==
Professional ratings
Review scores
Source	Rating
AllMusic	3/5 stars
Cross Rhythms	10/10 squares
Jesus Freak Hideout	4.5/5 stars
Melodic.net	4/5 stars
The Phantom Tollbooth	3.5/5 stars

AllMusic's Steve Huey said that "Bebo Norman's national debut album, Ten Thousand Days, is a smooth, polished folk-pop record spotlighting the singer's introspective musings on faith, Christianity, and love. Overall, it's more considered and soul-searching than the average CCM album, which makes it a success in spite of the occasional first-album misstep."

Cross Rhythms' Mike Rimmer said that "Bebo has the skill to pen songs that examine the human condition and the grace that can be discovered in the midst of broken-ness. There is healing and insight; truth in the midst of pain and plenty of grace emerging from struggle captured in these songs and they're delivered with a light rootsy musical touch built around Bebo's guitar. 'Ten Thousand Days' is a stunning understated introduction to Bebo's sensitive, vivid songwriting. Absolutely excellent."

Jesus Freak Hideout's Jenn Terry said that "Ten Thousand Days is the ideal folk, acoustic release to aid in unwinding and drawing closer to our Creator."

Melodic.net's Pär Winberg said that "Under this review youll find a review of Tom Dean. Well I could almost write the sam words for Bebo as for Tom. There are a few differences. Tom is a very good album, but Bebo is even better. THIS ALBUM IS A KILLER! Fantastic soft midwestern singersongwriter pop with exactly the right type of singer and mood. Lovely is what it is and the album is more than a must! Get it today. Bebo for president!"

The Phantom Tollbooth's Cathy Courtwright said that "if contemporary folk music is what you are looking for, look no further. While the project sounds similar in many sections, Bebo Norman has skillfully put together a project worthy of your time and ear." In addition, Courtwright wrote that "Ten Thousand Days is packed with a long register of songs."

The Phantom Tollbooth's Israel Kloss said that "this album is for the fan of quiet, contemplative, Phil Keaggy-tempo-meets-Chris-Rice-vocals music. It isn't for everyone, but it is an album that needed to be produced in the folk genre, and it shows Norman has skill and promise in his particular genre."

== Track listing ==
Tracklist
No.	Title	Writer(s)	Length
1.	"Walk Down This Mountain"	Norman	4:18
2.	"Stand"	Norman	3:57
3.	"The Hammer Holds"	Norman	5:22
4.	"I'm Alright"	Norman	4:41
5.	"Deeper Still"	Norman	4:12
6.	"Where the Angels Sleep"	Norman	4:36
7.	"The Man Inside"	Norman	3:08
8.	"Healing Song"	Norman	6:10
9.	"In Your Hands"	Norman	4:06
10.	"A Page Is Turned"	Norman	5:20
11.	"Selwood Farm"	Norman	4:17
12.	"Rita"	Norman	4:39
Total length:			54:46

== Personnel ==
- Bebo Norman – lead and backing vocals, acoustic guitar, percussion (8)
- Mark Stallings – acoustic piano (2, 5, 7, 11), Hammond B3 organ (2, 7), Wurlitzer electric piano (11)
- Alan Kaufman – accordion (7)
- Ben Wisch – acoustic piano (9)
- Ed Cash – acoustic guitar (1, 2, 5, 7, 10, 11), percussion (1, 3, 7, 8), backing vocals (1, 4, 7, 8, 11), electric guitar (2, 4, 5, 6, 10), bass (2), acoustic piano (3), Rhodes (4, 6, 9), drums (4, 10), Wurlitzer electric piano (8), harmonica (11)
- David Johnson – dobro (1), pedal steel guitar (5, 8), banjo (11), fiddle (11)
- Kenny Greenberg – electric guitar (4, 8), baritone guitar (8)
- Byron House – acoustic bass (1, 3), bass (2, 5, 6, 7, 11), fretless bass (10)
- Aric Nitzberg – bass (4, 8)
- Jim Brock – drums (1, 2, 6, 7), percussion (5, 10)
- Chloe Stephens – flute (2)
- Rann Russell – flute (4)
- Bob Blalock – French horn (3)
- Mark Munson – trombone (4)
- Phil Thompson – clarinet (5, 10)
- Jake Austell – horns (11)
- Ed Sweeny – horns (11)
- John Catchings – cello (3, 10, 12)
- Blair Masters – string arrangements (3, 5, 6, 10)
- Nashville Recording Symphony – strings (3, 5, 6, 10)
- Carey Boaz – backing vocals (1, 3)
- Danielle Young – backing vocals (2, 6)
- Chad Ellenberg – backing vocals (3)
- Cori Zarovsky – backing vocals (5, 10)

== Production ==
- Producer – Ed Cash
- Co-Producer – Bebo Norman
- Executive Producers – Robert Beeson and Cliff Young
- Engineers – Ed Cash and David Henson
- Additional Engineers – Tim Eaton, Joe Kuhlmann, Russ Long and Shane D. Wilson.
- Overdubs recorded by Jed Hackett, Russ Long and Shane D. Wilson.
- Recorded at Studio East (Charlotte, NC) and The Farm (Marvin, NC).
- Additional recording and overdubbing The Castle (Franklin, TN) and Battery Studios (Nashville, TN).
- Mixed by Ben Wisch
- Mastered by Ken Love at MasterMix (Nashville, TN).
- A&R Administration – Michelle Pearson
- Design – Michelle Kapp at Axis Media
- Photography – Michael Wilson
- Management – Micah Ottosen

== Charts ==
Chart (1999)	Peak position
US Billboard 200	27
US Heatseekers Albums (Billboard)	27
US Top Christian Albums (Billboard)	11
