= Bebo Norman =

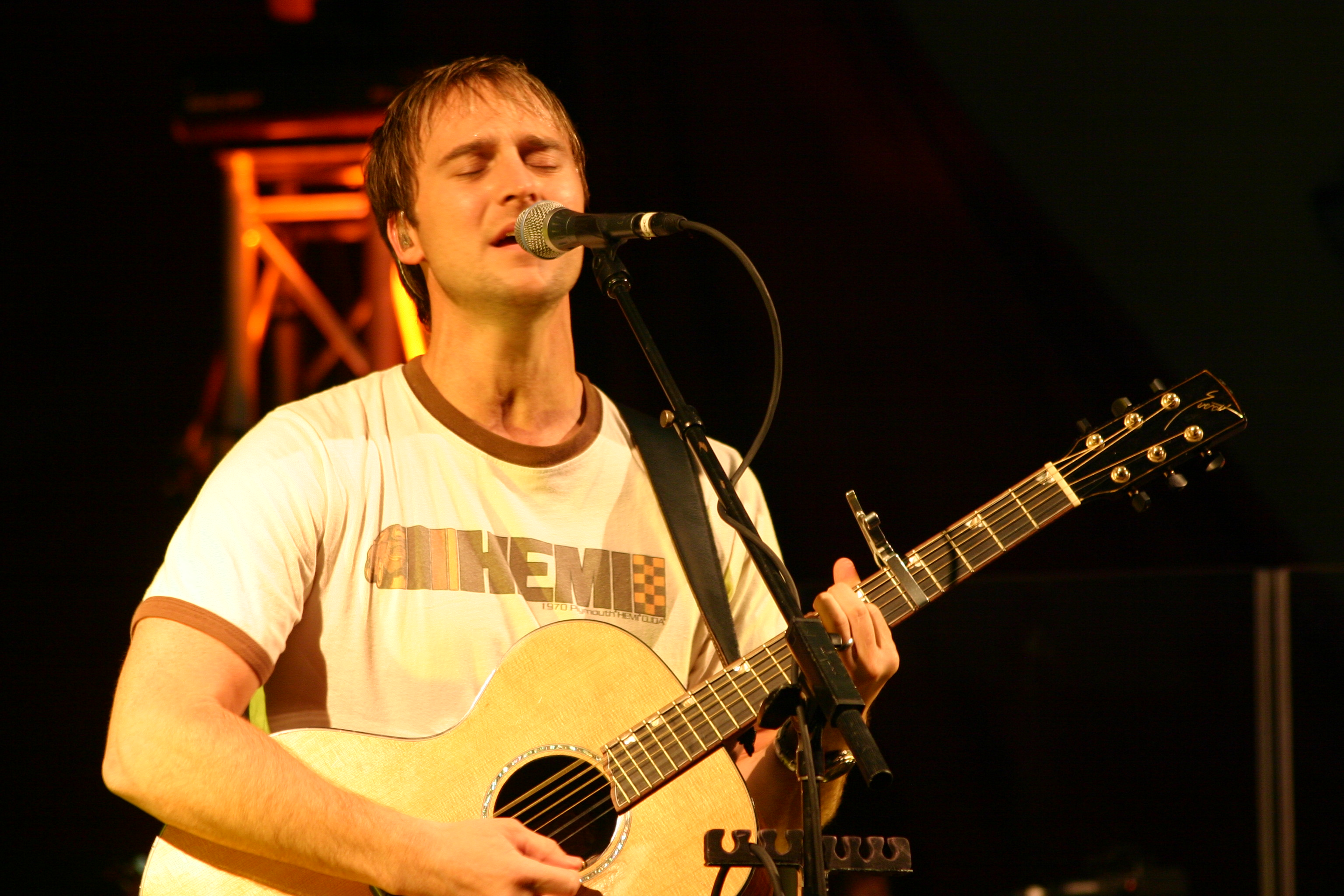

Background information
- Born: Jeffery Stephen Norman; May 29, 1973 (age 53)
- Origin: Columbus, Georgia, U.S.
- Genre: CCM
- Years active: 1995–2013
- Labels: Anchor Records, Watershed Records, Essential Records, BEC

Jeffery Stephen "Bebo" Norman (born May 29, 1973) is a retired contemporary Christian musician from Columbus, Georgia, US. His most successful album to date is Myself When I Am Real, which included hit songs "Great Light of the World" and "Falling Down". Other popular songs by Norman include "Disappear", "Nothing Without You", "I Will Lift My Eyes", and "Borrow Mine". He initially gained popularity when touring with another Christian band, Caedmon's Call. Norman's fans call themselves Simpletons. Norman is married to Roshare Finecey.

== Biography ==
=== Early life and career ===
Norman was originally involved in Young Life Ministries and gained a considerable fan base by performing at the summer camps there. This has drawn parallels to musician Matt Wertz and producer Ed Cash (Chris Tomlin, Amy Grant), both of whom gained fame through their involvement with Young Life. Upon releasing Big Blue Sky, his third album, Norman included a slip asking for donations to the organization. His song "Walk Down This Mountain" is about an experience at Young Life's Wilderness Ranch.

Norman released Between the Dreaming and the Coming True in September 2006. The tour in support of this album featured Christian music newcomers Aaron Shust and Brandon Heath. Norman is a graduate of Presbyterian College in Clinton, South Carolina. His song "To Find My Way To You" was used on various promotions for the CBS sitcom, The Class.

=== "Britney" and other projects ===
Bebo's single called "Britney" is written to Britney Spears, and is featured on Norman's ninth studio self-titled album. From 2007–08 Bebo appeared with several notable Christian artists on tour as they presented Andrew Peterson's "Behold the Lamb" concerts during the Christmas season.

Bebo Norman's album, Ocean, released on September 28, 2010, is a personal album, according to Norman, that covers the discovery of his true identity and the battle between fear and faith. The singer/songwriter told CBN.com that he hopes Ocean causes listeners to "look internally… at where they draw their own identity from. It's worth wrestling with who we are, where we draw our value from, and where we draw our life from and .... refocusing on the source of whatever season of life we are in rather than focusing on the season itself."

=== Retirement ===
On April 3, 2013, Bebo Norman announced his impending retirement from music, effective at the end of 2013. On the August 14, 2017, The Pivot podcast, hosted by Andrew Osenga, Norman explained that he had spent time as a stay-at-home dad, started a home renovation business and later supply company, and studied to become a physician assistant. His music had been written out of a place of conflict, desperation and loneliness, which were very prevalent feelings in his 20s. After marrying in 2003, his priorities shifted, and he eventually mapped out an exit strategy from the life of a touring musician. Norman successfully completed physician assistant school and is board certified with the National Commission on Certification of Physician Assistants. He joined Heritage Medical Associates as a PA-C in January 2021.

== Discography ==
Albums
Year	Title
1996	The Fabric of Verse
1999	Ten Thousand Days
2001	Big Blue Sky
2002	Myself When I Am Real
2004	Try
2006	Between the Dreaming and the Coming True
2007	Christmas... From the Realms of Glory
2008	Bebo Norman
2010	Ocean
2012	Lights of Distant Cities

== Awards ==
GMA Dove Awards

- 2003: City on a Hill: Sing Alleluia – Special Event Album of the Year
- 2010: "The Only Hope" – Inspirational Recorded Song of the Year
