= Jump5 discography =

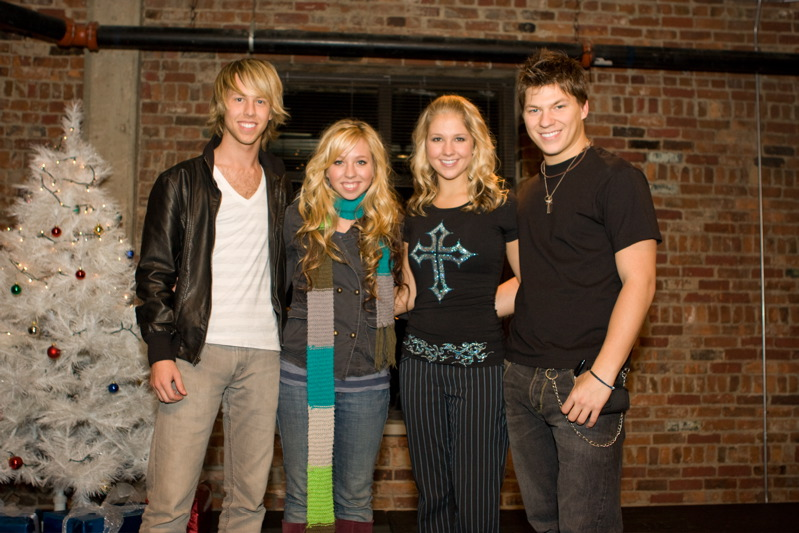
- Studio albums: 5
- Compilation albums: 5
- Singles: 22
- Video albums: 3
- Music videos: 9
- Christmas albums: 2
- Remix albums: 2

This is the discography of the Christian contemporary group Jump5. It consists of 7 studio albums, 22 singles, 3 video releases, 9 music videos, 5 compilation albums and 2 remix albums.

== Albums ==
=== Studio albums ===
Album	Details	Peak Chart Positions	
Album	Details	US	US Christ.
Jump5	Release Date: August 14, 2001; Label: Sparrow Records; Formats: LP, CD	—	14
All the Time in the World	Release Date: August 13, 2002; Label: Sparrow Records; Formats: LP, CD	86	3
Accelerate	Release Date: October 7, 2003; Label: Sparrow Records; Formats: LP, CD	150	8
Dreaming in Color	Release Date: September 21, 2004; Label: Sparrow Records; Formats: LP, CD	—	15
Hello & Goodbye	Release Date: October 9, 2007; Label: Slanted Records; Formats: LP, CD	—	—

=== Christmas albums ===
- All the Joy in the World (2002)
- Rock This Christmas (2005)

=== Compilation albums ===
- The Very Best of Jump5 (2005)
- Shining Star (2005)
- Top 5 Hits (2006)
- Greatest Hits (2008)
- The Ultimate Collection (2009)

=== Remix albums ===
- Mix It Up (2004)
- Christmas Like This (2007)

== Singles ==
Year	Single	US Christian		Album
Year	Single	CHR	AC	Album
2001	"Spinnin' Around"	—	—	Jump5
2001	"Start Jumpin'"	—	—	Jump5
2001	"God Bless the U.S.A."	—	—	Jump5 (Re-release)
2001	"The Meaning of Life"	—	—	Jump5
2002	"All I Can Do"	—	—	All the Time in the World
2002	"Joyride"	—	—	All the Time in the World
2002	"Forever in My Heart"	—	—	All the Time in the World
2002	"Joy to the World"	—	—	All the Joy in the World
2002	"A Strange Way to Save the World"	—	—	All the Joy in the World
2002	"Sleigh Ride"	—	—	All the Joy in the World
2003	"Throw Your Hands Up"	—	—	All the Time in the World
2003	"Do Ya"	—	—	Accelerate
2003	"Shining Star"	—	—	Accelerate
2003	"We Are Family"	—	—	Accelerate
2003	"Why Do I Do"	—	—	Accelerate
2004	"Wonderful"	19	22	Accelerate
2004	"Dance with Me"	—	—	Dreaming in Color
2004	"It's a Beautiful World"	—	—	Dreaming in Color
2006	"Both to Blame"	—	—	Online only
2007	"Shoot the Moon"	—	—	Hello & Goodbye
2007	"Fly"	—	—	Hello & Goodbye
2007	"I Surrender All"	—	—	Hello & Goodbye

== DVDs ==
- Jump5 (2002) (GOLD)
- All the Time in the World (2002) (GOLD)
- Start Dancin' With Jump5 (2003) (SILVER)

== Music videos ==
- Spinnin' Around
- God Bless the USA
- All I Can Do
- Beauty and the Beast
- Do Ya
- Aloha, E Komo Mai
- Welcome
- It's a Beautiful World
- Hawaiian Roller Coaster Ride
- Dance with Me

== In popular media ==
=== Soundtracks ===
- Sleepover - "Freeze Frame"
- The Lizzie McGuire Movie - "Shining Star"
- Ice Princess - "Just a Dream"
- Ella Enchanted - "Walking on Sunshine"
- Brother Bear - "Welcome"
- Lilo & Stitch: The Series - "Aloha, E Komo Mai"

A DVD release of Disney's Beauty and the Beast included an extra with them singing the title song, Beauty and the Beast.

"Aloha, E Komo Mai" features the voice of Chris Sanders in his role as Stitch.

=== Compilations ===
- Disney Channel Hits: Vol 1
- Disneymania
- Disneymania 2
- Disneymania 3
- Family Channel Hits: Vol 1
- Kim Possible Soundtrack
- The Lizzie McGuire Soundtrack
- That's So Raven Soundtrack
- Radio Disney Jingle Jams
- Radio Disney Jams 4, 5, and 6
- Radio Disney Ultimate Jams
- Mega Movie Mix
- Disney's Lilo & Stitch Island Favorites featuring songs from Lilo & Stitch 2: Stitch Has a Glitch (Disney 61379-7) [released in 2005]

=== Video games ===
- Disney's Extreme Skate Adventure (2003) - "Spinnin' Around"
- MC Groovz Dance Craze (2004) - "Walking on Sunshine"
- Jump5 Video Director (2004)
