= Satisfied (DecembeRadio album) =

Studio album by DecembeRadio
- Released: August 26, 2008
- Recorded: 2007–08
- Studios: Southern Tracks Recording (Atlanta, Georgia); The Rockporium (Canton, Georgia); First Baptist Church (Woodstock, Georgia); Little Big Sound (Nashville, Tennessee); Motha's Nature Recording Studio
- Genre: Rock
- Length: 48:44
- Label: Slanted
- Producer: Scotty Wilbanks

DecembeRadio chronology
DecembeRadio (2006)	Satisfied (2008)

Singles from Satisfied
- 1. "Find You Waiting" Released: October 2007 (CHR and AC); 2. "For Your Glory" Released: July 7, 2008 (CHR and AC); 3. "Better Man" Released: July 25, 2008 (Rock); 4. "Believer" Released: September 2, 2008; 5. "Look for Me" Released: February 16, 2009

Satisfied is the fourth studio album by American Christian rock band DecembeRadio; it was released in August 2008 through Slanted Records. Like their previous album, DecembeRadio (2006), it was recorded at Southern Tracks Recording in Atlanta, Georgia, and produced by Scotty Wilbanks. The songs were written to ensure they would translate well in a concert setting, and the band strove to write more uplifting lyrics than those on their previous album. Recording sessions began in September 2007 and were not completed until the second quarter of 2008, as the sessions twice were interrupted for concert tours.

The album debuted at its peak positions of number 116 on the Billboard 200 and number three on the Billboard Top Christian Albums charts; first week sales nearly doubled those of the band's previous album. DecembeRadio promoted Satisfied by making television and radio appearances ahead of its release, filming two promotional videos and headlining a concert tour of the United States. Satisfied received generally positive reviews; most critics approved of the band's continuation of the Southern rock sound evident on DecembeRadio. While critics disagreed on whether Satisfied measured up to DecembeRadio, a frequent complaint was the album's lack of lyrical depth. Satisfied won the 2009 Gospel Music Association Dove Award for Rock Album of the Year.

== Writing and production ==
DecembeRadio felt pressure to meet growing expectations following the accolades received for their previous album, DecembeRadio (2006), which won a Gospel Music Association Dove Award and was nominated for a Grammy Award. "We had some great stuff go on with the first record, but I think the biggest thing over the past two years has been trying to make sure Satisfied is not a sophomore slump" said lead guitarist Brian Bunn. While the self-titled album was written and recorded with little thought to how the songs would translate in concert, the experience of opening for Third Day helped DecembeRadio learn what works best live. Thus it was the band's goal to "make sure every single song on the [next] album worked well in a live concert setting", according to Bunn.

Writing for Satisfied began soon after the release of DecembeRadio and occurred in spurts, as the band found more success in letting ideas come to them spontaneously than in meeting for dedicated writing sessions. The chorus melody of "Be Alright", for example, popped into bassist and lead singer Josh Reedy's head while showering. On another occasion, Reedy came up with a riff on GarageBand while traveling between gigs. Two of the earliest completed songs, "Satisfy Me" and "Find You Waiting", were included in the band's live shows by April 2008. The former was the first song written for the album, and the latter was first released on the expanded edition of DecembeRadio in November 2007.

For Satisfied, DecembeRadio made a concerted effort to write lyrics that were more uplifting than those featured on their previous album. Said Bunn, "Our first record had a lot of darker songs such as 'Razor' and 'Greed'. Even though we liked some of that, we truly realized we're a bunch of happy guys! We like to have fun onstage and in our lives, so we didn't want this album to be as dark as the last one." To that end, the band wrote and included on Satisfied songs like "Better Man", which Reedy says imparts that "if we learn from our mistakes and follow Jesus Christ it will make us a better man", and the "vertical worship song" "For Your Glory". The band was inspired to write "Find You Waiting" following the death of a friend of producer Scotty Wilbanks. At the funeral, the man's widow stood over the casket praising God with arms raised amidst her sorrow. "It struck a chord in our hearts to write a song about how, no matter what current problem we might be facing, God's love and mercy is always waiting there for us", said Reedy.

"Gasoline"
Guitar feedback in "Gasoline" precedes an abrupt shift to a "Beatlesque" section including a children's choir, string section and piccolo trumpet.

Recording of Satisfied began in September 2007 at Southern Tracks Recording in Atlanta, Georgia. As with DecembeRadio's previous album, Scotty Wilbanks was hired as the producer. Said Reedy of Wilbanks, "We just have a kindredship as musicians and as players.... There's a lot of excitement and passion that comes from his end.... [A] big thing for us is having a really good time. If we're not having a good time making a record, it's gonna show and you're gonna hear it." To capture the excitement of their live shows, DecembeRadio recorded basic tracks live in the studio. Reedy said recording live is particularly useful for capturing energetic performances from drummer Boone Daughdrill. "It's definitely very critical for him to be on top of his game and feeling like it's a unit, because you play off of each other. It's a real push and pull thing that happens in rock and roll music that you really can't sometimes capture by just doing it track by track by track", said Reedy. Miker said the band recorded a handful of songs that were "out of the box of where CCM music is", and Reedy noted that some tracks "stretched what we're doing ... with production." "Gasoline", for example, includes a "Beatlesque" section with a children's choir, string section and piccolo trumpet, and "Falling for You" begins and ends with some guitar "shred licks" that started as a joke in the writing process.

DecembeRadio took a break from recording to headline the Drifter Tour in October and November, which also featured Nevertheless, Superhero and Bread of Stone. Recording resumed in early 2008, but the sessions were again interrupted for a major tour, this time in support of Third Day in March and April. Soon after the tour ended, DecembeRadio finished recording the album.

== Promotion and release ==
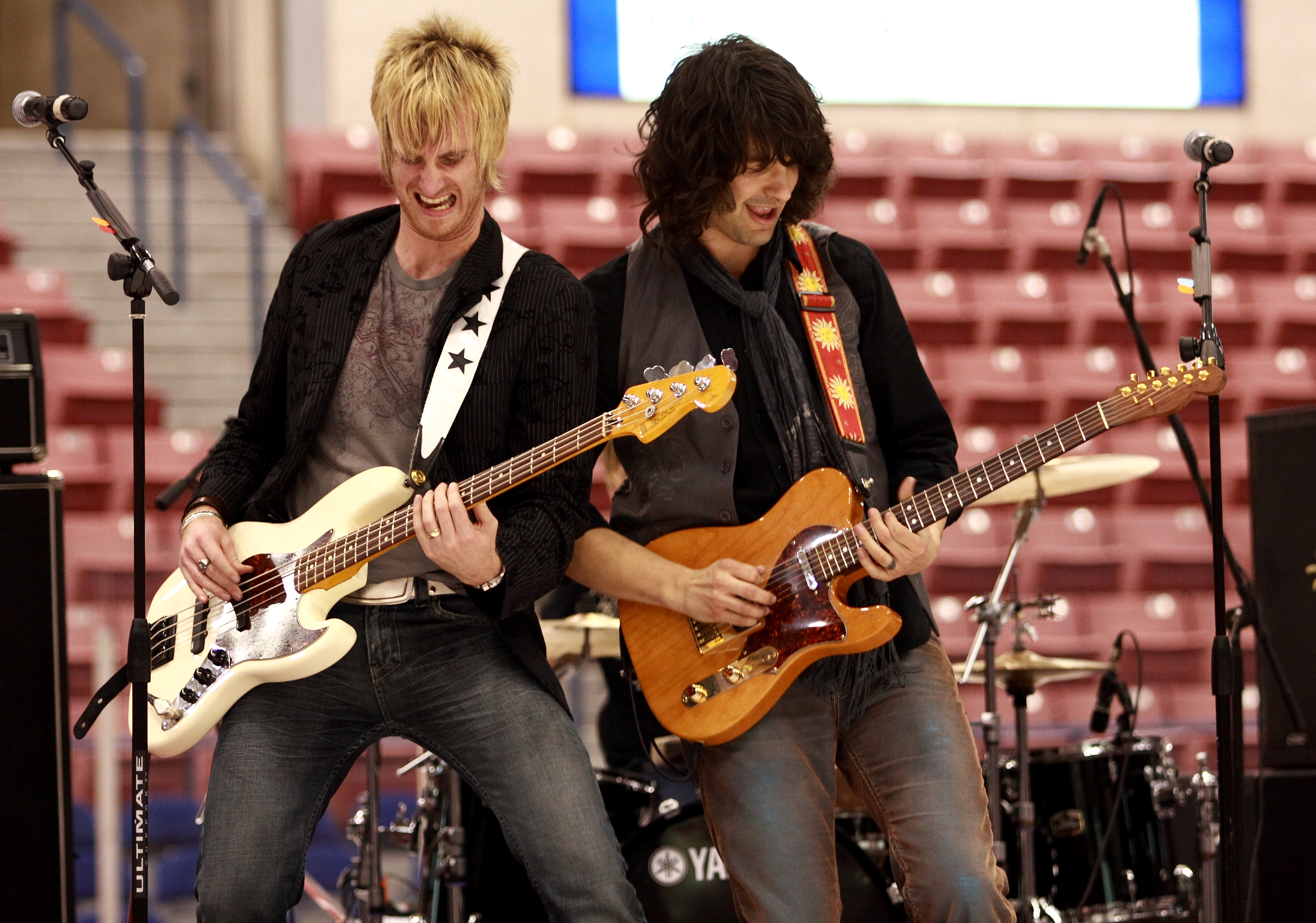
Josh Reedy and Brian Bunn performing at the North Charleston Coliseum on March 7, 2009.

Satisfied was released through Slanted Records on August 26, 2008, and debuted at its peak positions of number 116 on the Billboard 200 and number three on the Billboard Top Christian Albums charts. First week sales nearly doubled those of DecembeRadio. The album cover was the product of a spontaneous suggestion from the band's manager on the day of a photoshoot. Another photo had been slated for the album cover, but the band found a swamp and acted on their manager's idea. "We went down there, took off our shoes, rolled up our jeans a little bit and walked right into the water—and stood there for 45 minutes while we got our picture taken. It's a good thing we did it because when we got the pictures back, those were by far our favorite!" said Bunn.

DecembeRadio promoted Satisfied by making television and radio appearances in Atlanta before their concert at the local Hard Rock Cafe on August 20. Six days later, the band hosted an album release party at the Jefferson Center in Roanoke, Virginia, which sold out the 938-seat venue. After returning to the studio in September to record the Comfort & Joy Christmas EP, DecembeRadio filmed promotional videos for "Gasoline" and "Look for Me" in October. The band then headlined a month-long U.S. tour in support of Satisfied with Ruth, Sevenglory and speaker Billy Wayne. DecembeRadio returned to the road in February 2009 to open for Newsboys on their Join the Tribe Tour. During the tour, the video for "Look for Me" debuted on the Gospel Music Channel. According to Miker, however, some radio stations refused to play the track because the lyrics were written from the perspective of God.

== Critical reception ==
Professional ratings
Review scores
Source	Rating
Allmusic	3.5/5 stars
Billboard	(positive)
Christian Music Central	5/5 stars
Christianity Today	3.5/5 stars
Cross Rhythms	9/10 stars
Gospel Music Channel	(mixed)
Jesus Freak Hideout	3.5/5 stars
The Phantom Tollbooth	(positive)

"For Your Glory"
The "string-enhanced ballad" "For Your Glory" was compared to MercyMe by both Russ Breimeier of Christianity Today and Scott Fryberger of Jesus Freak Hideout.

Satisfied was generally regarded by critics as a continuation of the musical style from their previous album. Many reviewers praised DecembeRadio's "southern flavored rock", "punchy rhythm section" and "great guitar work", as well as the "ferocious howls of front man Josh Reedy". Gospel Music Channel's Beau Black, however, found that DecembeRadio's roots are "getting tougher to spot" as they try to be "all things to all people". Critics varied more widely on whether Satisfied's tracks measure up to those of DecembeRadio. Russ Breimeier of Christianity Today felt the songs "fail to leave as lasting an impression as those on the debut". Conversely, Andy Argyrakis, writing for Christian Music Central, detected more "blissfully controlled chaos" on Satisfied than on DecembeRadio, and Billboard's Deborah Evans Price called the album "even stronger" than the last and the band's playing "even tighter". A more moderate view was offered by Allmusic's Jared Johnson, who noted that while Satisfied contains "few, if any, inconsistencies or weak spots", it "falls short" due to "the lack of a strong single".

A frequent complaint among critics was the album's lack of lyrical depth. Black wrote that "Satisfy Me" "delivers a message listeners have likely heard a time or six before", and Scott Fryberger of Jesus Freak Hideout opined that DecembeRadio struggle to "be blatant about [their] faith without sounding cheesy". Breimeier described the lyrics as walking "a fine line between open expressions of faith and CCM clichés" and granted that while "Find You Waiting" "relies heavily on platitudes, it's still powerfully affecting and relatable testimony". Argyrakis, though, remarked that the band "has plenty to say" and their "stacked sounds are never at the expense of a meaningful gospel message".

Satisfied won the 2009 Dove Award for Rock Album of the Year and two of its tracks, "Find You Waiting" and "Better Man", were nominated for Rock/Contemporary Recorded Song of the Year and Rock Recorded Song of the Year, respectively. Reedy said that such recognition "inspires us to be ... better at what we do musically and bolder in what we believe in our faith."

== Track listing ==
All songs written by Brian Bunn, Boone Daughdrill, Eric Miker, Josh Reedy and Scotty Wilbanks, except where noted.

1. "Better Man" – 3:23
2. "Satisfy Me" – 3:22
3. "Believer" – 3:40
4. "For Your Glory" (Bunn, Daughdrill, Miker, Reedy, Wilbanks, Brian White) – 3:56
5. "Gasoline" – 2:51
6. "Falling for You" – 2:39
7. "Look for Me" (Bunn, Daughdrill, Miker, Reedy, Wilbanks, White) – 4:01
8. "Love Can" (Bunn, Daughdrill, Miker, Reedy, Wilbanks, Russ Lee) – 4:14
9. "Peace of Mind" – 3:32
10. "Be Alright" – 3:16
11. "Powerful Thing" (Bunn, Daughdrill, Miker, Reedy, Wilbanks, White) – 3:24
12. "Find You Waiting" – 4:07
  - 1:31 of silence brings the track length to 5:38
13. (hidden track) – 4:48

== Personnel ==
DecembeRadio

- Josh Reedy – lead vocals, bass
- Brian Bunn – lead guitar, vocals
- Eric Miker – guitars, vocals
- Boone Daughdrill – drums

Additional musicians

- Scotty Wilbanks – acoustic piano, Hammond B3 organ, clavinet, Wurlitzer electric piano, "other junk", horn arrangements, string arrangements (5, 7)
- Truett Pumphrey – cowbell (2)
- Sam Skelton – saxophones
- Eric Alexander – trombone
- Mike Barry – trumpet
- David Davidson – string arrangements (4, 5, 7)
- Love Sponge Strings – strings (4, 5, 7)
- The Soul Sisters – vocals
  - Kesha Dement, Carole Ford, Cheryl Rogers, Tanya Smith
- Kids Choir – vocals (5)
  - Dustin Bearden, Anna Reeves, Abby Hoenstine, Rebecca Bearden, Sarah Shiver, Will Coleburn

Production

- Scotty Wilbanks – producer, engineer
- Tom Tapley – engineer
- Brandon "Swaff" Swafford – additional engineer, digital editing
- Stephen Kaiser – assistant engineer
- Darren Tablan – assistant engineer
- Baheo "Bobby" Shin – string engineer (4, 5, 7)
- Shane D. Wilson – mixing
- Sarah Deane – mix coordinator
- Hank Williams – mastering at MasterMix (Nashville, Tennessee)
- Billy Williams – drum technician
- Joel "Angus" Huggins – tone chaperone
- The Reverend Snorty Haggard – special guest
- Jordan Butcher – layout
- Joshua Sage Newman – photography
- Abby Sasser – stylist
- Tina Davis – hair, make-up

== Chart positions ==
=== Album ===
Year	Chart	Peak position
2008	U.S. Billboard 200	116
2008	U.S. Billboard Top Christian & Gospel Albums	4
2008	U.S. Billboard Top Christian Albums	3

=== Singles ===
Year	Single	Chart	Peak position
2008	"Find You Waiting"	U.S. Billboard Hot Christian Songs	5
2008	"Find You Waiting"	U.S. Billboard Hot Christian Adult Contemporary	10
2008	"For Your Glory"	U.S. Billboard Hot Christian Adult Contemporary	27
2009	"Believer"	U.S. Billboard Hot Christian Songs	30
