= DecembeRadio =

American Christian rock band

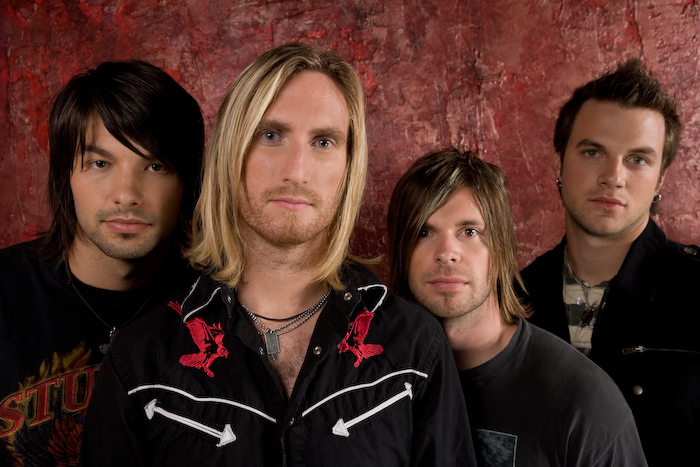
- DecembeRadio in 2007. From left to right: Brian Bunn, Josh Reedy, Boone Daughdrill, Eric Miker.

Background information
- Origin: Christiansburg, Virginia, US
- Genre: Christian rock
- Years active: 2003–2012
- Label: Slanted
- Past members: Brian Bunn; Eric Miker; Josh Reedy; Boone Daughdrill

DecembeRadio was an American Christian rock band formed in 2003 and composed of bassist and lead vocalist Josh Reedy, lead guitarist Brian Bunn, rhythm guitarist Eric Miker and drummer Boone Daughdrill.

Reedy, Bunn and Miker first ventured out on their own as DecembeRadio after a stint as touring band for evangelist Billy Wayne Arrington. After a year of gigging, DecembeRadio released two independent albums in early 2005. Following their signing with Slanted Records and the addition of Daughdrill on drums, the band released DecembeRadio in June 2006. The album was nominated for "Best Rock Or Rap Gospel Album" at the 49th Grammy Awards, and won the 2007 Dove Award for "Rock Album of the Year". A follow-up, Satisfied, was released in August 2008. DecembeRadio dissolved in 2012, and the members moved on to other musical projects.

Musically, DecembeRadio is heavily influenced by hard rock and blues-rock from the 1970s, owing to early exposure to family members' record collections. Their sound has been compared to that of Aerosmith, Led Zeppelin, The Black Crowes and Lenny Kravitz, among others.

== History ==
=== Early years ===
The members of DecembeRadio all began playing music in their teens. Josh Reedy and Brian Bunn attended the same schools, and the former's rendition of "Johnny B. Goode" on guitar at a middle school talent show convinced Bunn to take up guitar, as well. "Our first year of high school, we started a Top 40 band. We played Hootie & the Blowfish covers and that sort of thing. Then shortly thereafter, we realized that God had given us these gifts, and we wanted to utilize them for him," recalled Bunn. The pair decided to pursue music full-time upon graduation from Auburn High School in Riner, Virginia.

After a performance opening for evangelist Billy Wayne Arrington in Dublin, Virginia, Arrington invited Bunn and Reedy to join his touring band. Bunn credits Arrington with helping to alter the band's focus: "We were playing music for God, but we didn't really know why we were doing it. It was more so to be 'rock stars', per se, and just use God as a way to get there. And so he really helped us flip-flop that and get it the way it should be."

Eric Miker started playing guitar at the age of sixteen when his father taught him a few chords. After two years at West Virginia University, Miker felt a calling to go into Christian ministry. He met Bunn and Reedy at a youth event in West Virginia, where he impressed the pair with the "Sweet Child o' Mine" guitar lick that he added to a worship song. Shortly thereafter, Miker joined the band full-time, playing with Arrington for a few months before the trio ventured out on their own. The band came up with its name after Miker photographed an old radio with a calendar on top of it open to the month of December.

=== 2004–2005 ===
DecembeRadio played scattered dates for churches and youth groups in 2004 with Bunn as the lead singer. However, Bunn contracted a virus that paralyzed three-quarters of his vocal cords, and Reedy took over as lead singer. (Bunn regained most of his voice after therapy.) The band also found time to record two albums that were released independently in early 2005. Noise was a self-produced album of praise and worship covers on which each band member contributed at least two lead vocals, and Dangerous contained nine original songs and a cover of "Are You Gonna Go My Way" by Lenny Kravitz. Dangerous was produced with Scotty Wilbanks, whom the band met through Arrington.

Mississippi native Boone Daughdrill joined the band in late 2005; he had previously toured with Kimberly Perry, Jump5 and ZOEgirl. "We got Boone's phone number from [Wilbanks] about a year ago. We called him up and were like, 'We need a drummer for this stint of dates.' We met him at the airport and as soon as he walked off of the plane and gave us a big hug it was like we'd known him forever and we decided to keep him!" said Bunn. Wilbanks also arranged a showcase performance for DecembeRadio in front of record company executives, leading to the band’s signing with Slanted Records in December 2005.

=== DecembeRadio ===
The band’s first album for Slanted was recorded at Southern Tracks Recording in Atlanta, Georgia, in early 2006 with Wilbanks in the producer’s chair. The self-titled album was released on June 27, with lead single "Love Found Me (Love’s Got a Hold)" released to radio two months prior. Second single "Drifter" was released in August and slowly climbed the charts, finally peaking at number 5 on the Billboard Hot Christian Songs chart on December 30. Tour dates in 2006 were split between residencies at youth camps, one-off gigs at churches and schools, and the occasional festival date. In December, the band was nominated for a Grammy Award for "Best Rock Or Rap Gospel Album". They were hanging out in a guitar shop when they received the call from the president of their label; "We were kind of shocked but honored to have our first album be nominated for a Grammy," Miker said. The band lost to Jonny Lang at the awards ceremony a few months later.

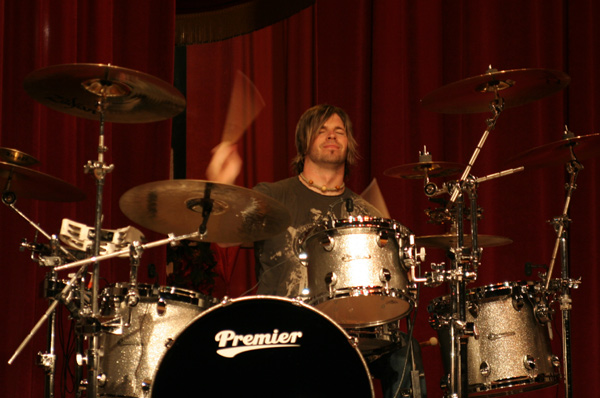
Boone Daughdrill performing at the Murray Hill Theatre in Jacksonville, Florida, on April 27, 2007.

DecembeRadio continued playing gigs and releasing singles from DecembeRadio to radio in early 2007, and then joined Superchick’s Generation Rising Tour for a string of dates in April and May. More accolades came the band's way with their nomination for four Dove Awards ("New Artist of the Year", "Rock Album of the Year", "Dangerous" for "Rock Recorded Song of the Year", and "Drifter" for "Song of the Year"), though their only win was for "Rock Album of the Year".

=== Satisfied ===
Recording for DecembeRadio's fourth album began in September 2007, again at Southern Tracks Recording. The band took a break in October and November to headline their own Drifter Tour, which also featured Nevertheless, Superhero and Bread of Stone. Near the end of the tour, Slanted Records released an expanded edition of DecembeRadio, which included a new track recorded during the aforementioned recording session. The song, "Find You Waiting", performed similarly to "Drifter", climbing slowly and not reaching its peak position of No. 5 on the Billboard Hot Christian Songs chart until April 5, 2008.

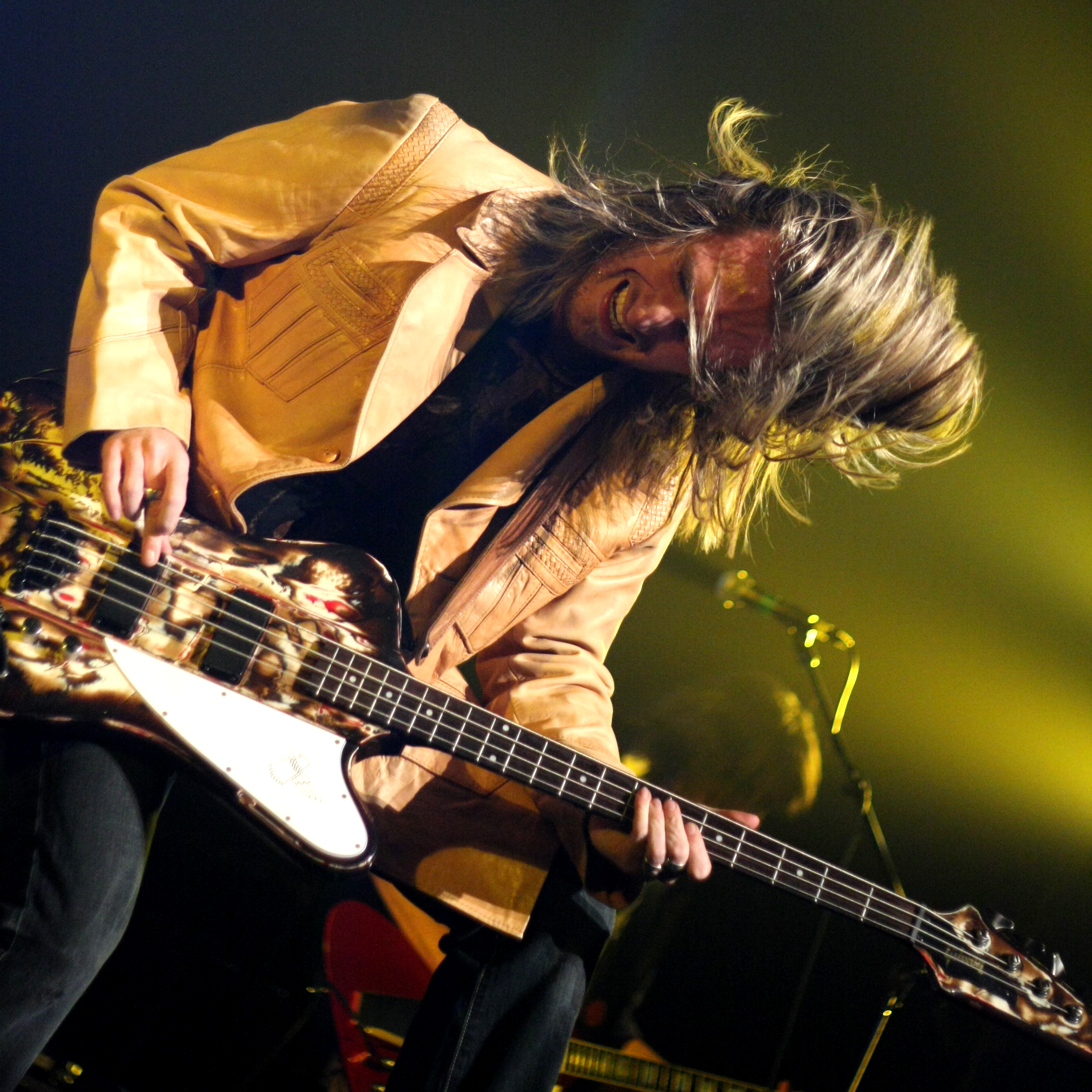
Josh Reedy performing at the North Charleston Coliseum in South Carolina on March 6, 2008.

Recording of the band's fourth album continued in early 2008, but the sessions were again interrupted for a major tour, this time in support of Third Day in March and April. Soon after the tour ended, DecembeRadio finished recording the album, which was titled Satisfied and released on August 26. "It's got a real southern feeling, definitely 'Crowes-ish' and swampy," said Reedy of the album. Satisfied debuted at its peak positions of number 116 and 3 on the Billboard 200 and Top Christian Albums charts, respectively. Following a two-month break, DecembeRadio embarked on a month-long headlining tour in support of Satisfied with guests Ruth, Sevenglory and Billy Wayne. A digital-only EP entitled Comfort & Joy was released on November 25, 2008. The EP contains covers of three Christmas songs: "God Rest Ye Merry Gentlemen", Chuck Berry's arrangement of "Run Run Rudolph" and an instrumental version of "Away in a Manger".

DecembeRadio began a two-month North American tour in support of Newsboys in February 2009. The following year, the band released a live album on both CD and DVD in March, and Daughdrill left DecembeRadio in September to join The Band Perry. A five-song EP, Southern Attic Sessions, was released on March 15, 2011.

=== Dissolution ===
DecembeRadio played its last concert on November 8, 2012. No announcement of the band's dissolution was ever made, but in 2013 the three remaining members formed a mainstream country music trio called JEBtown, which played at least one show in Nashville and filmed a music video for a studio track. By 2014, the band members had moved on to other projects. Josh Reedy toured as a bass player with Chris Cagle, then joined Thomas Rhett's band as a keyboardist and guitarist. Brian Bunn had a stint as a touring guitarist with Third Day, then joined Reedy in Rhett's band. Eric Miker became a youth pastor and worship band musician at Jewel City Church in Shinnston, West Virginia.

== Musical style and influences ==
DecembeRadio's music is strongly influenced by hard rock and blues-rock from the 1970s, be it directly through artists like Aerosmith and The Rolling Stones, or through later interpreters such as The Black Crowes and Lenny Kravitz. The band's label, Slanted Records, also notes the influence of Porcupine Tree, Audioslave and other contemporary rock bands. In addition, their music has been compared to U2, Stone Temple Pilots and King's X. "We feel like God has called us to a musical style that is not represented as much as, say, more modern, harder edged bands. We are bringing the old school to the new school," says Josh Reedy.

The band members credit family members with introducing them to rock music through old collections of vinyl records. Boone Daughdrill cites "When the Levee Breaks" as his biggest influence. "When I heard that drum fill come in the intro...oh! I was a little kid and my uncle had all of the Zeppelin records. He was a drummer too and he would always be like, 'Man, check these guys out.' I was only three or four and I didn’t know what music was, but I knew that I loved that."

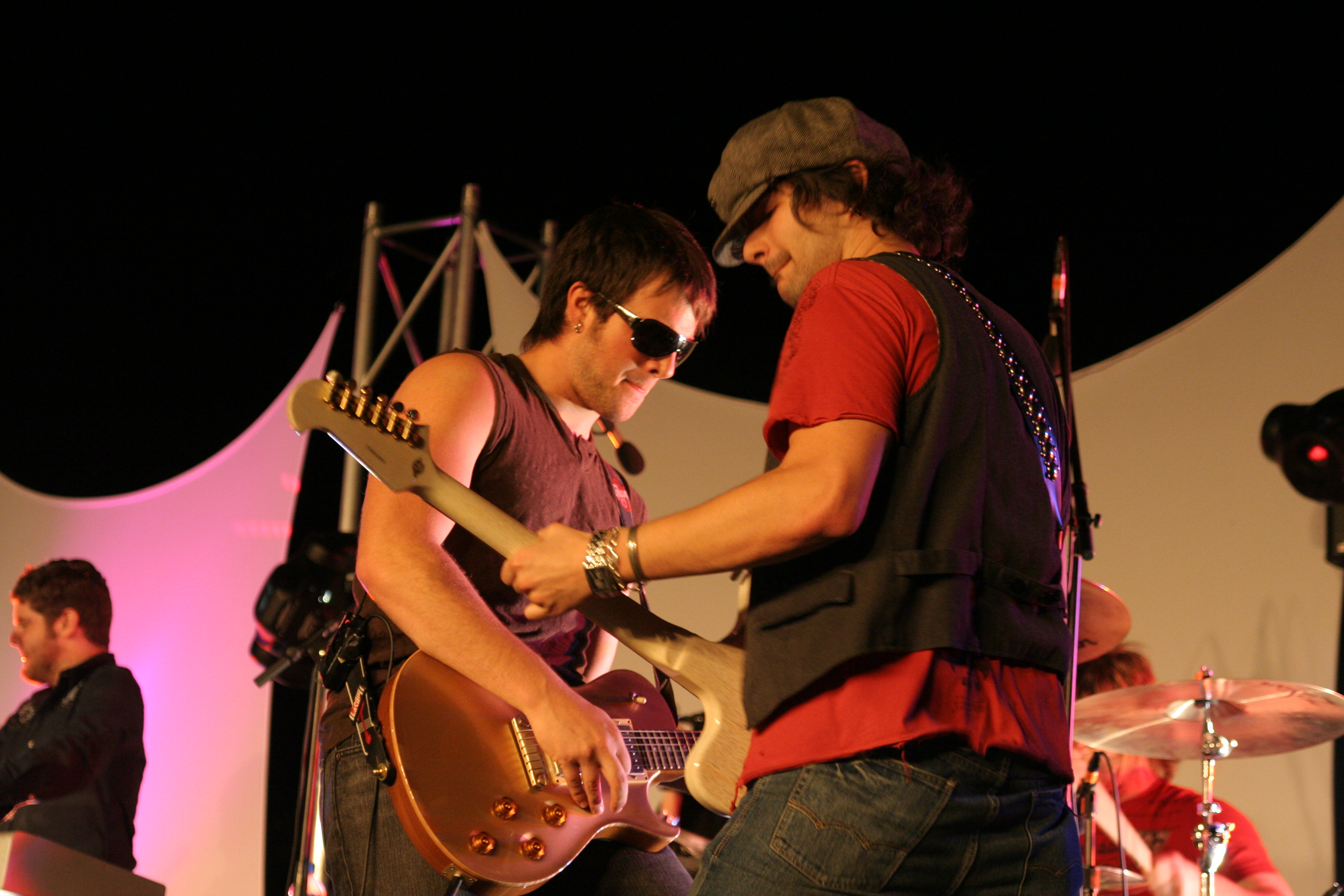
Eric Miker and Brian Bunn performing at Southeastern University in Lakeland, Florida, on January 9, 2008.

Brian Bunn and Eric Miker credit Eric Clapton and Keith Richards, respectively, with their interest in taking up guitar. Bassist Reedy started out on guitar, as well, stating that his inspiration was either "Crossfire" or "The House Is Rockin'" by Stevie Ray Vaughan. "I was really into blues before anything else," said Reedy.

== Members ==
- Brian Bunn – lead guitar, vocals (2003–12)
- Eric Miker – rhythm guitar, vocals (2003–12)
- Josh Reedy – lead vocals, bass guitar (2003–12)
- Boone Daughdrill – drums, percussion (2005–10)

== Discography ==
=== Studio albums ===
Title	Details	Peak chart positions	
Title	Details	US	US Christ.
Dangerous	Released: January 1, 2005; Label: Independent; Formats: CD	—	—
Noise	Released: January 1, 2005; Label: Independent; Formats: CD	—	—
DecembeRadio	Released: June 27, 2006; Label: Slanted Records; Formats: CD, digital download, streaming	— (Note: DecembeRadio did not enter the Billboard 200, but peaked at number 48 on the Billboard Top Heatseekers.)	33
Satisfied	Released: August 26, 2008; Label: Slanted; Formats: CD, digital download, streaming	116	3
"—" denotes a recording that did not chart or was not released in that territory.

=== Live albums ===
Title	Details
Live	Released: March 23, 2010; Label: Slanted; Formats: CD

=== Extended plays ===
Title	Details
Southern Attic Sessions	Released: August 23, 2011; Label: Slanted; Formats: CD, digital download, streaming

=== Singles ===
Title	Year	Peak chart positions		Album
Title	Year	US Christ.	US Christ. AC	Album
"Love Found Me (Love's Got a Hold)"	2006	—	—	DecembeRadio
"Drifter"	2006	5	18	DecembeRadio
"Dangerous"	2006	—	—	DecembeRadio
"Least of These"	2007	—	—	DecembeRadio
"Table"	2007	—	—	DecembeRadio
"Can't Hide"	2007	—	—	DecembeRadio
"Find You Waiting"	2007	5	10	Satisfied
"For Your Glory"	2008	—	—	Satisfied
"Better Man"	2008	—	—	Satisfied
"Believer"	2008	30	—	Satisfied
"Look for Me"	2009	—	—	Satisfied
"—" denotes a recording that did not chart or was not released in that territory.

== Awards ==
=== GMA Dove Awards ===
Year	Award	Result
2007	New Artist of the Year	Nominated
2007	Song of the Year ("Drifter")	Nominated
2007	Rock Recorded Song of the Year ("Dangerous")	Nominated
2007	Rock Album of the Year (DecembeRadio)	Won
2009	Rock Recorded Song of the Year ("Better Man")	Nominated
2009	Rock/Contemporary Recorded Song of the Year ("Find You Waiting")	Nominated
2009	Rock Album of the Year (Satisfied)	Won
2009	Rock Album of the Year (Live)	Nominated
