= Hello Goodbye (disambiguation) =

"Hello, Goodbye" is a 1967 song by the English rock band The Beatles.

Hello Goodbye or Hello and Goodbye may also refer to:

== Film and TV ==
- Hello, Goodbye!, the 2026 series finale of the American late-night comedy television series The Late Show with Stephen Colbert
- Hello-Goodbye (1970 film), a 1970 comedy film
- Hello Goodbye (2008 film), a 2008 film starring Fanny Ardant and Gérard Depardieu
- Hello Goodbye (TV series), a Dutch TV reality programme focussing on the passengers using Amsterdam Airport Schiphol
- "Hello, Goodbye" (Dark Angel), a 2002 television episode
- "Hello, Goodbye" (Friday Night Lights), a 2008 television episode
- "Hello Goodbye" (Slow Horses), a 2024 television episode
- "Hello Goodbye" (Ugly Betty), a 2010 television episode
- "Hello, Goodbye" (Wing and a Prayer), a 1997 television episode

== Music ==
- hellogoodbye, American power-pop band
- Hello Goodbye (band), Scandinavian indie-rock band

=== Albums ===
- Hello Goodbye (David Tao album), 2013
- Hello Goodbye (Shiori Niiyama album), 2015
- Hello & Goodbye, a 2007 album by the Christian pop group Jump5

=== Songs ===
- Hello, Goodbye, a 1967 single by the English rock band The Beatles
- "Hello Goodbye" (Tyler Farr song), a 2012 song by Tyler Farr
- "Hello/Goodbye", a song by Blind Melon from Soup
- "Hello Goodbye", a song by Erik Segerstedt and Tone Damli
- "Hello Goodbye", a 2024 song by Charli XCX from the deluxe version of Brat

== Books ==
- Hello, Good-bye, a Japanese visual novel published in 2010 by Lump of Sugar

== See also ==
- Goodbye and Hello (disambiguation)
- Hello and Goodbye (disambiguation)
