= DecembeRadio (album) =

Studio album by DecembeRadio
- Released: June 27, 2006
- Recorded: January 26 – February 1, 2006
- Studio: Southern Tracks Recording and Exocet Studios (Atlanta, Georgia); The Jukebox (Canton, Georgia); Topboost Music (Franklin, Tennessee); Motha's Nature Recording Studio
- Genre: Rock
- Length: 44:33
- Label: Slanted
- Producer: Scotty Wilbanks

DecembeRadio chronology
Noise (2005)	DecembeRadio (2006)	Satisfied (2008)

Alternative cover
- Expanded Edition cover

Singles from DecembeRadio
- 1. "Love Found Me (Love's Got a Hold)" Released: April 21, 2006; 2. "Drifter" Released: August 14, 2006 (CHR and AC); 3. "Dangerous" Released: August 28, 2006 (Rock); 4. "Least of These" Released: February 2007 (CHR and AC); 5. "Table" Released: April 23, 2007 (Rock); 6. "Can't Hide" Released: October 26, 2007 (Rock)

Professional ratings
Review scores
Source	Rating
About.com	5/5 stars
Allmusic	4.5/5 stars
Christian Music Review	9/10 stars
CCM Magazine	A
Christianity Today	4/5 stars
Cross Rhythms	8/10 stars
Jesus Freak Hideout	4/5 stars
The Phantom Tollbooth	4/5 stars
The Phantom Tollbooth	(mixed)
Wise Men Promotions	(3/5)

DecembeRadio is the major label debut album by the band DecembeRadio. Produced by Scotty Wilbanks, the album features a guitar-driven sound that quickly earned it comparisons to The Black Crowes, King's X, Aerosmith and Free. The album was nominated for a "Best Rock or Rap Gospel Album" Grammy Award, and won the 2007 Dove Award for "Rock Album of the Year". Two of the album's tracks were also nominated for Dove Awards: "Drifter" for "Song of the Year", and "Dangerous" for "Rock Recorded Song of the Year".

== Overview ==
DecembeRadio was recorded at Southern Tracks Recording in Atlanta, Georgia from January 26 to February 1, 2006. Whereas the band's previous album of original material, Dangerous, contained many mid-tempo songs and ballads with prominent acoustic guitar, most of the songs on DecembeRadio are propelled by overdriven chords played in unison by the two guitarists. Verses often give way to sections of jangly ("Table" and "Can’t Hide") or ringing ("Greed") guitars punctuated by crunchy power chords. First single "Love Found Me (Love’s Got a Hold)" is the only obvious example of the band's Southern rock influences, sounding particularly like The Black Crowes with its underlying piano, horns and female backing vocals. Acoustic guitars feature prominently in the ballad "Drifter", and also appear in the mid-tempo "Least of These" and "Alright My Friend". Producer Scotty Wilbanks adds color not only with subtle sound and vocal effects, but with his own keyboard playing (which takes center stage in the untitled studio jam after "Least of These").

Lyrical topics are varied, and include reminders that all will face God eventually ("Can’t Hide" and "Table"), exhortations to follow Biblical example ("Dangerous" and "Least of These") and acknowledgments of personal struggles ("Greed" and "Razor").

Three of the songs on DecembeRadio are rewrites of songs that appeared on Dangerous. "Love Found Me (Love’s Got a Hold)" features completely rewritten verses. "Live and Breathe" offers rewritten verses, new lyrics and a new melody in the chorus. Most radically changed, however, was "Dangerous", which retains only the main riff and the first line of the chorus.

== Release ==
DecembeRadio was released in the US through Slanted Records on June 27, 2006. The album appeared in two of Billboard's Christian music charts during its first week of eligibility, and then dropped out of the charts for over a year. It was during DecembeRadio's 2008 tour with Third Day that the album returned to the charts, including its first Billboard Top Heatseekers appearance, where it reached the antepenultimate spot. DecembeRadio has sold nearly 50,000 copies.

=== Expanded Edition ===
An Expanded Edition of DecembeRadio was released on November 13, 2007. This version includes the original album (minus the studio jam after "Least of These"), and adds a new single called "Find You Waiting" (written by DecembeRadio & Scotty Wilbanks), as well as an acoustic version of "Love Found Me (Love's Got a Hold)". "Find You Waiting" was recorded during the September 2007 sessions for the band's next album. The Expanded Edition is also an Enhanced CD, containing video of a live performance of "Drifter" and a twenty-four-minute interview. New artwork and a sticker complete the package.

== Track listing ==
All songs written by Brian Bunn, Eric Miker, Josh Reedy and Scotty Wilbanks, except where noted.

1. "Can't Hide" – 3:25
2. "Dangerous" – 4:07
3. "Love Found Me (Love's Got a Hold)" – 3:38
4. "Greed" – 4:26
5. "Drifter" (Bunn, Miker, Reedy) – 4:39
6. "Live and Breathe" – 3:37
7. "Alright My Friend" – 4:30
8. "Razor" – 4:00
9. "Table" – 4:12
10. "Least of These" – 4:33
  - There is a hidden studio jam (2:54) that begins at 5:01, bringing the track length to 7:55.

== Personnel ==
DecembeRadio

- Brian Bunn – lead guitar, vocals
- Eric Miker – guitars, vocals
- Josh Reedy – bass, lead vocals
- Boone Daughdrill – drums

Additional musicians

- Scotty Wilbanks – acoustic piano, Hammond B3 organ, keyboards, percussion, horn arrangements (3)
- Peter Stroud – slide guitar (5)
- Sam Skelton – saxophone (3)
- Eric Alexander – trombone (3)
- Mike Barry – trumpet (3)
- Tanya Smith, Kesha Dement and Cheryl Rogers – backing vocals (3, 5)
- Rev. Snorty Haggard – old man preacher (4)

=== Production ===
- Eric Johnson – executive producer
- Scotty Wilbanks – producer, additional engineer
- Tom Tapley – engineer
- Stephen Kaiser – assistant engineer
- Brian Bunn – additional engineer
- Shane D. Wilson – mixing at Pentavarit (Nashville, Tennessee)
- Kip Kubin – mix assistant
- Alice Smith – mix coordinator
- Richard Dodd – mastering
- AnnJanette Cormier – art direction
- Chad Smith – art direction
- Celeste Winstead – art direction, stylist
- Jordan Butcher – design
- Greg Lutze – concept photography
- Josh Reeder – band photography
- Mary Elizabeth Long – hair, make-up

2007 Expanded Edition

- Brandon "Swaff" Swafford – additional editing (11)
- Tom Tapley – mixing (12)
- Jim DeMain – additional mastering
- Alex McCollough – additional mastering
- Jordan Butcher – art direction, design
- Eli McFadden – band photography
- Ben Hancock – band photography assistant
- Abby Sasser – stylist
- Jami Harris – make-up

== Charts ==
=== Album ===
Year	Chart	Peak position
2008	U.S. Billboard Top Heatseekers	48
2008	U.S. Billboard Top Christian & Gospel Albums	38
2008	U.S. Billboard Top Christian Albums	33

=== Singles ===
Year	Single	Chart	Peak position
2006	"Drifter"	U.S. Billboard Hot Christian Songs	5
2007	"Drifter"	U.S. Billboard Hot Christian Adult Contemporary	18

== Awards ==
In 2007, the album won a Dove Award for Rock Album of the Year at the 38th GMA Dove Awards.
