= Hello (After Edmund album) =

Studio album by After Edmund
- Released: February 26, 2008
- Recorded: 2007
- Genre: Christian rock
- Length: 42:23
- Label: Slanted

Professional ratings
Review scores
Source	Rating
AllMusic	4.5/5 stars
Cross Rhythms	8/10

Hello is the first non-independent studio album from American Christian rock band After Edmund. It was released on February 26, 2008 through Slanted Records. Four radio singles were released off the album: "Thank God", "Like a Dream", "Fighting For Your Heart (Let It Go)" and "Clouds". The album was nominated at the 51st Grammy Awards of 2009 for Best Rock or Rap Gospel Album.

== Track listing ==
1. "Thank God" - 3:18
2. "Fighting For Your Heart (Let It Go)" - 4:06
3. "Everyone" - 3:37
4. "Like a Dream" - 3:30
5. "Darkest Room" - 00:42
6. "Come and Rain Down" - 4:36
7. "Tears" - 3:52
8. "Stealing Away" - 4:19
9. "Go Oboe!" - 1:56
10. "Clouds" - 4:26
11. "It's Alright" - 3:16
12. "To See You Leave" - 5:17

== Awards ==
The album was nominated for a Dove Award for Rock/Contemporary Album of the Year at the 40th GMA Dove Awards.
