= Top 5 Hits =

Top 5 Hits may refer to:

- Top 5 Hits (Jump5 album), 2006
- Top 5 Hits, a 2006 album by Rebecca St. James
- Top 5 Hits, a 2006 album by ZOEgirl
