= Treetops (band) =

Australian band

- Origin: Melbourne, Victoria, Australia
- Genre: Indie
- Years active: 2000–2009
- Label: Slanted Recordings
- Members: Ben Montero, Jordan Speering
- Past members: Angus Tarnawsky, Brett Wolfenden, Emmett Smith, Gerald Weels, Jesse Beaton, Leif Gordon-Bruce

Treetops were a Melbourne band who released three EPs between 2002 and 2005. The core members were Ben Montero, Emmett Smith, Leif Gordon Bruce and Jordan Speering, with The Age once referring to them as, "a two-piece that collaborates with other players".

== History ==
Ben Montero formed the band in the early 2000s, using funds received from compensation over a head injury to buy instruments and a four-track recorder. He was joined by Jordan Speering and Emmett Smith, and together they formed a band called Earphones, before changing their name to Treetops.

Treetops debut EP What's The Matter, Baby? was released independently in 2002, and sold out its initial 1000 pressings. The EP was then re-released by Cavalier Music and peaked at #14 in the AIR Singles Charts.

In 2003 Treetops signed with Slanted Records and released Lionheart, which their label called "both a companion piece and a successor to "What's The Matter, Baby?"" In reviews, the EP was noted for its diversity of sounds, with dB Magazine calling them "an interesting proposition for the future". Lionheart reached #13 in the AIR Independent Singles/EPs Chart, and was followed by a third EP Gospel in 2005.

Gospel received strong reviews at the time, with Beat Magazine awarding it Single of the Week, writing that it "trumps the twee Lionheart EP in every respect". Faster Louder praised the EP's production from Jonathan Burnside, who had also been working with The Sleepy Jackson, with many reviews noting that bands influence on Treetops.

Following a live session for PBS 106.7FM, Treetops were said to be moving forward from their tumultuous past year, which had seen several lineup changes prior to the release of Gospel. But in 2005 Treetops were dropped from their record label due to poor sales.

In 2006 the band released a new song I Can't Stop Thinking About Spiders on their MySpace. Intended for the "forthcoming debut album The Standing Baba's", ultimately their album was "shelved" and a final release, Treemo - The Treetops complete demos (2001-2006), compiling the bands early demos was also made available online.

Treetops continued to play together until at least 2009, and several members went onto join Ben Montero's next band The Brutals, who released one album in 2010. Ben has since released two solo albums under the name Montero, and became known for his visual art works.
