= Mix It Up =

Remix album by Jump5
- Released: April 6, 2004
- Recorded: 2000–2004
- Genre: Contemporary Christian, pop, dance, house
- Length: 48:21
- Label: Sparrow

Jump5 chronology
Accelerate (2003)	Mix It Up (2004)	Dreaming in Color (2004)

Professional ratings
Review scores
Source	Rating
Allmusic	4/5 stars

Mix It Up: Jump5 Remixed is a remix album by Christian pop group Jump5. It was released on April 6, 2004. It includes nine remixes of songs from their previous studio albums (excluding their Christmas album, All the Joy in the World), three tracks containing in-studio audio of the group, and a cover of Kool & the Gang's "Celebration", which is slightly different from the original version of their cover previously released on the Kim Possible soundtrack. this album is the last to feature former member, Libby Hodges, who left the group that same year.

Mix It Up charted at #3 on Billboard's Top Dance/Electronic Albums chart in 2004.

== Track listing ==
No.	Title	Writer(s)	Remixer(s)	Length
1.	"Start Jumpin'" (Double Dutch remix)	Mark Pennells; Zarc Porter	Double Dutch	3:30
2.	"Wonderful" (Chunky Style)	Kevan Cyka; Dan Needham; Lynn Nichols	Needham	3:43
3.	"Pressure" (Berlin mix)	Shannon Ford; Dan Muckala	Tedd T.	4:30
4.	"Messing with Me" (interlude)			1:30
5.	"Do Ya" (Rec Room mix)	Michelle Tumes	Mark Hammond	3:59
6.	"Spinnin' Around" (Whirlwind mix)	Hammond; Grant Cunningham; Stephanie Lewis	Tedd T.	3:58
7.	"All I Can Do" (The Historemix)	Billy Chapin; Chris Omartian; Linda Elias	Muckala	4:08
8.	"Throw Your Hands Up" (Rec Room mix)	Pennells; Porter	Hammond	4:11
9.	"Beat Box Session" (interlude)			1:18
10.	"Joyride" (GREAT PEOPLE remix)	Omartian; Gina Lawton; Kyra Lawton; Todd Lawton	Michael Linney	3:56
11.	"Why Do I Do" (Bestes remix)	Nichols; Chrissy Conway; Alisa Girard; Kristin Swinford; Tedd T.	Chris Estes	4:03
12.	"We Are Family" (Ghostmix)	Bernard Edwards, Nile Rodgers	Kene "Ghost" Bell	4:50
13.	"Celebration"	Ronald Bell; Claydes Smith; George Brown; James Taylor; Robert Spike Mickens; Earl Toon; Dennis Thomas; Robert Bell; Eumir Deodato	n/a	3:18
25.	"Hidden Track"			1:32

- Tracks 14 through 24 are between five and six seconds in length each, totaling 48 seconds between "Celebration" and the hidden track.

== Personnel ==
Credits adapted from the liner notes of Mix It Up.

- Jump5 – vocals
  - Chris Fedun
  - Brandon Hargest
  - Brittany Hargest
  - Libby Hodges
  - Lesley Moore
- Mark Hammond – original production
