= Hello and Goodbye =

Hello and Goodbye may refer to:

- Hello & Goodbye, album by Jump5
- Hello-Goodbye (1970 film), light comedy film.
- Hello and Goodbye (1972 film), Soviet comedy film.
- Hello and Goodbye (play), 1965 play by Athol Fugard.
- "Hello and Goodbye", an episode of L.A. Law
- "Hello and Goodbye", a song in Evita (musical)
- "Hello and Goodbye", a song in the film From Noon till Three
- "Hello and Goodbye", a song from The Ataris album End Is Forever

== See also ==
- "Hello, Goodbye", a 1967 song by the Beatles
- Goodbye and Hello (disambiguation)
- Hello Goodbye (disambiguation)
