= The Ultimate Collection (Jump5 album) =

Greatest hits album by Jump5
- Released: April 7, 2009
- Recorded: 2001–2005
- Genre: Contemporary Christian, pop, pop rock
- Label: Sparrow

Jump5 chronology
Greatest Hits (2008)	The Ultimate Collection (2009)

The Ultimate Collection is a compilation album by Christian pop group Jump5, released on April 7, 2009.

== Track listing ==
=== Disc one ===
No.	Title	Writer(s)	Length
1.	"Spinnin' Around"	Mark Hammond, Grant Cunningham, Stephanie Lewis	3:39
2.	"All I Can Do"	Billy Chapin, Linda Elias, Chris Omartian	3:11
3.	"We Are Family"	Bernard Edwards, Nile Rodgers	3:39
4.	"Walking on Sunshine"	Kimberley Rew	4:04
5.	"Friends"	Michael W. Smith, Deborah D. Smith	3:45
6.	"Wonderful"	Kevin Cyka, Dan Needham, Lynn Nichols	3:19
7.	"Do Ya"	Michelle Tumes	3:09
8.	"Shining Star"	Philip Bailey, Larry Dunn, Maurice White	3:17
9.	"Beautiful to Me"	Ian Eskelin, Barry Weeks	2:52
10.	"Summer Song"	Tumes	3:37
11.	"God Bless the U.S.A."	Lee Greenwood	3:20
12.	"Just a Dream"	Sam Mizell	3:17

=== Disc two ===
No.	Title	Writer(s)	Length
1.	"Throw Your Hands Up"	Mark Pennells, Zarc Porter	3:13
2.	"I've Got the Music in Me"	Tobias Boshell	3:49
3.	"Dance with Me"	Chapin, Elias, Omartian	2:44
4.	"In My Heart"	Stuart Brawley, Tumes	2:36
5.	"It's a Beautiful World"	Antonina Amato, Rob Cavallo, Tim James	3:38
6.	"Virtual Reality"	David Browning	3:31
7.	"Don't Run Away"	Cyka, Needham	3:32
8.	"Dreaming in Color"	Steve Diamond, Hammond, Michael Ripoll	3:23
9.	"Why Do I Do"	Chrissy Conway, Alisa Girard, Kristin Swinford, Nichols, Tedd Tjornhom	3:21
10.	"Wish That I Could Read Your Mind"	Cunningham, Bob Halligan, Jr., Tjornhom	3:49
11.	"Joy to the World"	Isaac Watts	3:36
12.	"Change a Heart, Change the World"	Brown Bannister, Jess Cates, Cunningham, Dan Muckala	4:22
