= The Very Best of Jump5 =

Greatest hits album by Jump5
- Released: March 15, 2005
- Recorded: 2001–2005
- Genre: Contemporary Christian, pop, pop rock
- Length: 40:20
- Label: Sparrow
- Producer: Mark Hammond

Jump5 chronology
Dreaming in Color (2004)	The Very Best of Jump5 (2005)	Shining Star (2005)

Professional ratings
Review scores
Source	Rating
AllMusic	3/5 stars

The Very Best of Jump5 is a greatest hits compilation album by Christian pop group Jump5. It includes nine previous releases, including "Beauty and the Beast" which had previously only appeared on the first Disneymania album. It also contains three new songs, including a cover of Michael W. Smith's "Friends" from his album Change Your World. A limited-edition version was also released, which included the "Jump5 Video Director" computer game. This was the last release by Jump5 while they were still signed to Sparrow Records. The Very Best of Jump5 charted at No. 30 upon the Billboard Top Christian Albums chart.

== Track listing ==
No.	Title	Writer(s)	Length
1.	"Spinnin' Around"	Mark Hammond, Grant Cunningham, Stephanie Lewis	3:39
2.	"Throw Your Hands Up"	Mark Pennells, Zarc Porter	3:13
3.	"Don't Run Away"	Kevin Cyka, Dan Needham	3:32
4.	"Beauty and the Beast"	Alan Menken, Howard Ashman	3:27
5.	"Beautiful to Me"	Ian Eskelin, Barry Weeks	2:52
6.	"All I Can Do"	Billy Chapin, Chris Omartian, Linda Elias	3:11
7.	"God Bless the U.S.A."	Lee Greenwood	3:20
8.	"Do Ya"	Michelle Tumes	3:09
9.	"We Are Family"	Bernard Edwards, Nile Rodgers	3:39
10.	"Dance with Me"	Billy Chapin, Linda Elias, Chris Omartian	2:44
11.	"It's a Beautiful World"	Antonina Amato, Rob Cavallo, Tim James	3:38
12.	"Friends"	Michael W. Smith, Deborah D. Smith	3:45

- The versions of "Do Ya" and "Dance with Me" that appear here are slightly different than they appeared on their original releases.
- The tracks "Don't Run Away", "Beautiful to Me" and their cover of Michael W. Smith's "Friends" were recorded for "Radio The World", an album that was never released.

Jump5 Video Director
- Cover art of Jump5 Video Director
- Publisher: Sparrow Corporation
- Platform: Microsoft Windows
- Release: November 2004
- Genre: Simulation
- Mode: Single-player

== Jump5 Video Director ==
Jump5 Video Director was a computer game released as a CD-ROM in November 2004. It was also included with copies of The Very Best of Jump5 in 2005. The game allowed the player to create a live Jump5 performance by synchronizing choreography and selecting stage elements and camera angles.
