= Dreaming in Color =

Studio album by Jump5
- Released: September 21, 2004
- Recorded: 2004
- Genre: Contemporary Christian, pop, pop rock
- Length: 32:34
- Label: Sparrow
- Producer: Max Hsu

Jump5 chronology
Mix It Up (2004)	Dreaming in Color (2004)	The Very Best of Jump5 (2005)

Singles from Dreaming in Color
- 1. "Dance with Me" Released: 2004; 2. "It's a Beautiful World" Released: 2004

Professional ratings
Review scores
Source	Rating
Allmusic	3.5/5 stars

Dreaming in Color is the fifth studio album by Christian pop group Jump5, released on Sparrow Records on September 21, 2004. It is the first release from the group as a quartet after the departure of Libby Hodges. Singles from the album included "Dance with Me" and "It's a Beautiful World". The album charted at #15 on Billboard's Top Christian Albums chart. I've Got the Music in Me is a cover of a song by The Kiki Dee Band from the album that has the same name of the song.

== Track listing ==
No.	Title	Writer(s)	Length
1.	"In My Heart"	Stuart Brawley, Michelle Tumes	2:36
2.	"Just a Dream"	Sam Mizell	3:17
3.	"Dance with Me"	Billy Chapin, Linda Elias, Chris Omartian	2:44
4.	"Dreaming in Color"	Steve Diamond, Mark Hammond, Michael Ripoll	3:23
5.	"I've Got the Music in Me"	Tobias Boshell	3:49
6.	"It's a Beautiful World"	Antonina Amato, Rob Cavallo, Tim James	3:38
7.	"Mind Your Head"	Mark Pennells, Zarc Porter	4:04
8.	"Feels Like Falling"	Brittany Hargest, Paul Jenkins, Brad Minor	3:22
9.	"Dance with Me (Barnyard Remix)"	Chapin, Elias, Omartian	3:18
10.	"In My Heart (Remix)"	Brawley, Tumes	2:29
