= All the Time in the World (Jump5 album) =

Studio album by Jump5
- Released: August 13, 2002
- Recorded: 2001–2002
- Studio: Glorified Mono Studio, Rec Room Studios, Tennessee
- Genre: Contemporary Christian music, pop, teen pop
- Length: 38:07
- Label: Sparrow

Jump5 chronology
Jump5 (2001)	All the Time in the World (2002)	All the Joy in the World (2002)

Singles from All the Time in the World
- 1. "All I Can Do" Released: June 27, 2002; 2. "Joyride" Released: August 13, 2002; 3. "Forever in My Heart" Released: December 1, 2002; 4. "Throw Your Hands Up" Released: April 8, 2003

All the Time in the World is the second studio album from Christian pop group Jump5. "All I Can Do" was released as a Radio Disney single, while the "Joyride" and "Forever in My Heart" singles were later released for both Christian contemporary hit radio (CHR) and adult contemporary radio. "Angel in My Heart" is a cover of a Hear'Say song from their Everybody album.

== Track listing ==
No.	Title	Writer(s)	Length
1.	"All I Can Do"	Billy Chapin, Linda Elias, Chris Omartian	3:11
2.	"Throw Your Hands Up"	Mark Pennells, Zarc Porter	3:13
3.	"Summer Song"	Michelle Tumes	3:37
4.	"Joyride"	Omartian, Gina Lawton, Kyra Lawton, Todd Lawton	3:26
5.	"Angel in My Heart"	Eliot Kennedy, Suzanne Shaw, Tim Woodcock	3:44
6.	"Put Me in the Picture"	Grant Cunningham, Bob Halligan, Jr., Tedd Tjornhom	2:51
7.	"Forever in My Heart"	Mark Hammond, Stephanie Lewis	3:24
8.	"Diamond"	Dan Muckala, Steven Siler	3:25
9.	"Throw Your Hands Up (Remix)"	Pennells, Porter	3:18
10.	"Joyride (Remix)"	Omartian, G. Lawton, K. Lawton, T. Lawton	4:16
11.	"All I Can Do (Remix)"	Chapin, Elias, Omartian	3:47

== Reception ==
The album peaked at No. 3 on the Billboard Contemporary Christian Album Charts, and No. 86 on the Billboard 200.

A DVD acting as a companion for the album was released on August 13, 2002, the same date as the album. It included the music video for "All I Can Do," a live performance of "Start Jumpin'" on Go for It! TV, and a behind the scenes featurette about the making of the "Beauty and the Beast" music video, as well the Disney song appeared in Disneymania as exclusive interviews.

== Promotion and features ==
Jump5's "All I Can Do" was re-recorded to promote a hidden commercial with JCPenney "It's All Inside". And the hits of their own songs were to appear in Radio Disney's promotion with McDonald's Mighty Music CD & Radio Disney Jams Vol. 6 and the Lizzie McGuire soundtrack.
