= Accelerate (Jump5 album) =

Studio album by Jump5
- Released: October 7, 2003
- Recorded: 2003
- Genre: Contemporary Christian music, pop rock, power pop
- Length: 33:48
- Label: Sparrow

Jump5 chronology
All the Joy in the World (2002)	Accelerate (2003)	Mix It Up (2004)

Singles from Accelerate
- 1. "Do Ya" Released: 2003; 2. "Shining Star" Released: 2003; 3. "We Are Family" Released: 2003; 4. "Why Do I Do" Released: 2003; 5. "Wonderful" Released: 2004

Professional ratings
Review scores
Source	Rating
AllMusic	3/5 stars

Accelerate is the fourth album by the Christian pop group Jump5. It was released on October 7, 2003. It charted at No. 150 on the Billboard 200 and at No. 8 on the Top Christian Albums charts. The album demonstrated the group's shift towards a pop rock sound, and was also the first album on which a member of the group had writing credits. Half of the album was covers, including "Do Ya" by Michelle Tumes, "Way of the World" by Don Philip and "Walking on Sunshine" by Katrina and the Waves. The group's cover of Sister Sledge's "We Are Family" was later used as the theme for the Radio Disney Family Pledge Initiative. The group's cover of "Shining Star" by Earth, Wind & Fire was part of The Lizzie McGuire Movie's soundtrack.

== Track listing ==
No.	Title	Writer(s)	Length
1.	"Do Ya"	Michelle Tumes	3:09
2.	"We Are Family"	Bernard Edwards, Nile Rodgers	3:39
3.	"Wonderful"	Kevin Cyka, Dan Needham, Lynn Nichols	3:19
4.	"Pressure"	Shannon Ford, Dan Muckala	3:09
5.	"Why Do I Do"	Chrissy Conway, Alisa Girard, Kristin Swinford, Nichols, Tedd Tjornhom	3:21
6.	"Way of the World"	Mark Hammond, Robin Scoffield	3:24
7.	"Walking on Sunshine"	Kimberley Rew	4:04
8.	"Every Part of Me"	Matthew Gerrard, Michele Vice-Maslin	3:24
9.	"All Because of You"	Brandon Hargest, Paul Jenkins, Dave Elliot Johnson, Brad Minor	3:06
10.	"Shining Star"	Philip Bailey, Larry Dunn, Maurice White	3:17

== DVD release ==
Start Dancin' with Jump5 was released on DVD on November 18, 2003. The DVD featured the group teaching the choreography for "Spinnin' Around", "All I Can Do", and "Do Ya". It also contained music videos from the group's previous DVD releases, including the music video for "Do Ya".
