= The Real Life (album) =

Studio album by Bread of Stone
- Released: September 24, 2013
- Genre: Contemporary Christian music, pop rock
- Length: 41:52
- Label: Dream
- Producer: Lynn Nichols, Tedd T.

The Real Life is the first major label studio album by Bread of Stone. DREAM Records released the album on September 24, 2013. Bread of Stone worked with Lynn Nichols and Tedd T., in the production of this album.

== Critical reception ==
Professional ratings
Review scores
Source	Rating
Christian Music Zine	4.25/5
Cross Rhythms	7/10 squares
HM Magazine	2.5/5 stars
Indie Vision Music	3/5 stars
Jesus Freak Hideout	3.5/5 stars
New Release Tuesday	3.5/5 stars

Rating the album a three and a half stars for Jesus Freak Hideout, Bert Gangl states, "The Real Life nevertheless features an invigoratingly sunny disposition, sparkling production aesthetic and firm understanding of the intrinsic relationship between the indie and pop genres that render it the strongest installment in the Bread of Stone catalog thus far". Kelly Sheads, awarding the album three and a half stars at New Release Tuesday, writes, "The Real Life is any example of the creative musicianship this quartet has to offer". Giving the album a seven out of ten from Cross Rhythms, Danny McMartin says, "'The Real Life' features a sunny presentation and crisp production with a balance between approachable pop and indie."

Joshua Andre, rating the album a 4.25 out of five by Christian Music Zine, describes, "The Real Life is a great album full of inspiration, fervour, diverse music". Indicating in a three star review at Indie Vision Music, Jonathan Andre writes, "The Real Life is such an inspiring and fun album full of moments of contemplation as well as joyous melodies of praise and worship." Sarah Brehm, signaling in a two and a half star review at HM Magazine, describes, "Though the album contains a few gems, its lack of originality will keep it from making much of an impression."

== Track listing ==
No.	Title	Writer(s)	Length
1.	"Hold On"	Ben Kristijanto, Lynn Nichols, Tedd T.	5:03
2.	"The Real Life"	Wesley Holt, Kristijanto, Nichols, Tedd T.	4:05
3.	"The Line"	Holt, Kristijanto, Nichols, Tedd T.	3:46
4.	"Changed"	Kristijanto, Nichols, Tedd T.	4:10
5.	"Parachute"	Blake Easter, Kristijanto, Nichols, Nathan Walters	3:27
6.	"Beautiful"	Easter, Curt Gibbs, Kristijanto, Nichols	3:24
7.	"Supernatural"	Kristijanto, Nichols, Tedd T.	4:32
8.	"I'll Be"	Kristijanto, Tedd T.	3:54
9.	"One Way Runner"	Holt, Kristijanto, Nichols, Tedd T.	3:59
10.	"Heartbeat"	Easter, Kristijanto, Nichols, Tedd T.	5:32
Total length:			41:52
