= After Edmund =

American art rock band (2001–2015)

- Origin: LaGrange, Georgia, USA
- Genres: Art rock, rock and roll, Christian rock
- Years active: 2001–2015
- Label: Slanted
- Past members: Mitch Parks; Joey West; Austin Abbott; Adam Stanley; Yates; Matt McFadden; Ben Hosey
- Website: afteredmund.com (defunct)

After Edmund was an art rock band from LaGrange, Georgia.

== Band history ==
The members of After Edmund formed as a band in 2001, originally under the name Taken. During that time they had five independent releases: Not the Typical EP (2002), Moonlight E-CD Single and ARE You Listening? in 2003, and Amplified EP (2004). The SA BA DE EP in 2005 was Taken's final independent release before the band changed their name to After Edmund. The name is a reference to the character Edmund Pevensie in the book series The Chronicles of Narnia by C. S. Lewis.

=== Hello: 2006–2008 ===
In November 2006, the band signed onto Slanted Records and began recording for their first main studio album until February 2007. It was originally prepared for release in mid-2007, but the date was pushed forward to February of the following year. The album is reportedly the same version as the original demo releases in 2007, but instead "gave Slanted Records more time to market After Edmund just right." The album was finally released under the title Hello on February 26, 2008, nearly a year after the band finished recording it. The album was produced by Scotty Wilbanks.

In July 2008 they even did a string of concerts throughout Sweden in support of the album. Following the international dates, the After Edmund fans cast enough votes to garner the attention of Linkin Park's Projekt Revolution Tour. On the Atlanta date of that tour After Edmund had the privilege of opening for such acts as Linkin Park, Chris Cornell and The Bravery. The performance earned them exposure on the nationally syndicated network MTV2. In the fall of that year, the band opened for their friends in Building 429 on their US tour.

According to the winter 2008 edition of the LaGrange College Columns, drummer Adam Stanley recently left the group. Matt McFadden took over at drums, and Mitch Parks switched to bass.

After Edmund was nominated for Best New Artist in CCM Magazine's Readers Choice Awards. As a result of their positive reception they were asked back for another stint throughout February and March on Building 429's Truth, Hope & Love Tour, this time playing alongside Above the Golden State, among others.

February saw the band being nominated for a Grammy Award at its 51st ceremony.

=== Spaceships & Submarines: The Lively Sessions: 2009–2010 ===
For the Dove Awards of 2009, After Edmund's debut release Hello was nominated in the Best Rock/Contemporary Album category. At the award ceremony in April 2009, the band presented 3 awards, including two awards to The Blind Boys of Alabama, and Reuben Morgan's award for his song "Mighty to Save". The band performed at multiple music festivals during the summer of 2009.

On October 6, After Edmund released a combination live DVD and EP entitled Spaceships and Submarines: The Lively Sessions. The video portion features a live, in-studio performance of four previously unreleased songs, three from their first record Hello, and two instrumental tracks. The audio of the songs was made available through a downloadable version that comes with the DVD. In addition to these two, a limited edition sticker and mini-poster was made available.

During the rest of October, the band joined Lecrae, Mikeschair, Sho Baraka and Tedashii on the Altered Minds Tour. Together they played concerts throughout the east coast, mid-west and southern United States.

After Edmund member, Matt Yates (keyboard, vocals), decided to leave the band, as of May 1, 2010, to spend more time with his family.

=== Times Have Changed EP: 2010–2015 ===
On July 1, 2010, After Edmund released the new single "Dance Like You're From the Future" on their website for a free download. It was the first released track from their forthcoming, unannounced release. On August 1, they released to YouTube a viral video for the single. The single garnered favorable reviews from fans and critics alike.

Quickly following the release of the single, the band went on a short mini-tour through Texas and the south-east. Immediately proceeding this, they went back into the studio to dive head first into their next release. They spent numerous months writing and recording at their studio in LaGrange, GA. They release a series of video blogs on the band's YouTube channel entitled "After Edmund: In The Studio."

On Dec. 1 the official announcement was made that their latest creation would be a double EP set entitled "Times Have Changed." The EPs would be released separately, the first of which (Times Have Changed EP No. 1) becoming available on Feb.1 through digital distribution as well as at the band's concerts. It had been written, recorded and produced by the band entirely independent and for free. Combined with the announcement, the band also started their annual Christmas card giveaway in which any fan who wants one may receive in the mail an After Edmund/Christmas themed postcard signed by the band.

The second song released from "Times Have Changed EP No. 1," Monster, was made available for streaming on January 1 via the band's Myspace and Facebook Fanpage. This was the first of a 30-day series of planned content releases to give back to their fans. Over the next month the band would go on to give away numerous different things ranging from After Edmund desktops wallpapers to video blogs and guitar tabs.

Throughout January, several other announcements had been made regarding unanswered questions about the future. One was a confirmation of mounting suspicions that newly found touring keyboardist, Austin Abbott, had been made an official member of the band.

The band released an album titled "Art and Commerce" in April 2013.

After Edmund also announced their upcoming plans to tour throughout March and April with Fireflight, on their Overcome Tour. Together the bands will be playing shows in Seattle, Los Angeles and other areas of the country.

On January 15, 2015, the band announced via their Facebook page that they were no longer a touring band, thus officially announcing their break up.

== Members ==
Although the lists below show the primary instruments played (particularly on studio recordings), all of the members are able to play other instruments as well.

Former members

- Mitch Parks – bass, lead vocals
- Patty O'Mally – guitar, vocals
- Joey West – drums, vocals
- Austin Abbott – keyboard, vocals
- Matt Yates – keyboards, vocals
- Adam Stanley – drums
- Matt McFadden – drums, vocals
- Ben Hosey – guitar, vocals
- Tommy Smith* – drums
- Clay Butler* – guitar, vocals

 *Member of the original Taken lineup

== Discography ==
Studio albums

- 2008: Hello – (Slanted)
- 2013: Art and Commerce

EPs

- 2009: Spaceships and Submarines: The Lively Sessions (EP)
- 2011: Times Have Changed EP No. 1
- 2012: Strange Education EP

Singles

- "Like a Dream"
- "Fighting for Your Heart"
- "Clouds"
