= Goodbye and Hello =

Goodbye and Hello may refer to:

- Goodbye and Hello (Tim Buckley album), 1967
- Goodbye & Hello (Tanya Chua album), 2007

== See also ==
- Hello and Goodbye (disambiguation)
- Hello Goodbye (disambiguation)
