= Jump5 (album) =

Studio album by Jump5
- Released: August 14, 2001
- Recorded: 2000–2001
- Studios: Antenna Studios, Franklin, TN Black Dog Studios, Nashville, TN, Rec Room Studio, Franklin TN, Brentwood, Franklin TN
- Genres: Contemporary Christian, pop, bubblegum pop, teen pop
- Length: 42:28
- Label: Sparrow
- Producer: Mark Hammond

Jump5 chronology
Jump5 (2001)	All the Time in the World (2002)

Singles from Jump5
- 1. "Spinnin' Around" Released: May 2001; 2. "Start Jumpin'" Released: July 2001; 3. "God Bless the U.S.A." Released: October 2001; 4. "The Meaning of Life" Released: November 2001

Professional ratings
Review scores
Source	Rating
Allmusic	4/5 stars
The Phantom Tollbooth	3/5 stars
CCM Magazine	3/5 stars

Jump5 is the self-titled debut album from Christian pop group of the same name. It was released on August 14, 2001 through Sparrow Records. Two re-releases followed: the first featured the "Start Jumpin'" bonus track targeted towards Christian audiences, while the second featured a Radio Disney-targeted version of "Start Jumpin'" with different lyrics plus a cover of Lee Greenwood's "God Bless the U.S.A." to remember the lives lost after the September 11 attacks. A portion of sales from the second re-release was donated to families who lost a loved one during the attacks on September 11, 2001.

"Spinnin' Around" was released as the album's lead Radio Disney single. A music video for this song was also filmed for release on VHS and DVD. The Radio Disney versions of "Start Jumpin'" and "God Bless the USA" were both released for airplay on Radio Disney.

== Track listing ==
No.	Title	Writer(s)	Length
1.	"Spinnin' Around"	Mark Hammond, Grant Cunningham, Stephanie Lewis	3:39
2.	"Virtual Reality"	David Browning	3:31
3.	"Change a Heart, Change the World"	Brown Bannister, Jess Cates, Cunningham, Dan Muckala	4:22
4.	"The Meaning of Life"	Mark Pennells, Zarc Porter	3:41
5.	"All I Want"	Sam Mizell, Matthew West	3:22
6.	"Wish That I Could Read Your Mind"	Cunningham, Bob Halligan, Jr., Tedd Tjornhom	3:49
7.	"Tell Me Why"	Pennells	3:08
8.	"I Belong to You"	Doug Beiden, Jamie Moore	3:28
9.	"Love Ya Too Much"	Cunningham, Hammond	3:38
10.	"When I Say Your Name"	Doug Belden, Lewis	3:35

=== First re-release ===
No.	Title	Writer(s)	Length
11.	"Start Jumpin' (Christian Version)"	Pennells, Porter	2:59

=== Second re-release ===
No.	Title	Writer(s)	Length
11.	"Start Jumpin' (Radio Disney Mix)"	Pennells, Porter	2:59
12.	"God Bless the U.S.A."	Lee Greenwood	3:20

== Home media ==
A VHS and DVD home video release acting as a companion to the album was released on March 26, 2002. It includes the music videos for "Spinnin' Around" and "God Bless the U.S.A." as well as interviews with the group.

== Featured ==
The song "Spinnin' Around" appeared in the video game Disney's Extreme Skate Adventure and was also featured in the Lizzie McGuire episode, "The Rise and Fall of the Kate Empire" (S2:E4).
