= All the Joy in the World =

Studio album by Jump5
- Released: October 22, 2002
- Recorded: 2002
- Studio: Rec Room Studios, Brentwood, Tennessee
- Genre: Christmas, pop
- Length: 27:18
- Label: Sparrow

Jump5 chronology
All the Time in the World (2002)	All the Joy in the World (2002)	Accelerate (2003)

Singles from All the Joy in the World
- 1. "Joy to the World" Released: October 31, 2002; 2. "A Strange Way to Save the World" Released: October 31, 2002; 3. "Sleigh Ride" Released: December 11, 2002

All the Joy in the World is Jump5's first Christmas album, released on October 22, 2002. Their covers of "Joy to the World", "A Strange Way to Save the World" and "Sleigh Ride" were released to Christian contemporary hit radio (CHR) and adult contemporary radio on the week of October 31, 2002, just in time for the Christmas and holiday season of that year. The album is a mix of both traditional and modern Christmas covers. "A Strange Way to Save the World" is a cover of a 4Him song from their album "The Season of Love". The album charted at No. 10 on the Billboard Top Holiday Albums chart and No. 16 on their Top Christian Albums charts.

== Track listing ==
No.	Title	Writer(s)	Length
1.	"Joy to the World"	Isaac Watts	3:36
2.	"Santa Claus Is Coming to Town"	John Frederick Coots, Haven Gillespie	4:01
3.	"Sleigh Ride"	Leroy Anderson	3:12
4.	"Wonderful Christmastime"	Paul McCartney	3:12
5.	"Rockin' Around the Christmas Tree"	Johnny Marks	3:21
6.	"A Strange Way to Save the World"	Dave Clark, Don Koch, Mark Harris	3:52
7.	"Sleigh Ride (Remix)"	Anderson	3:11
8.	"Wonderful Christmastime (Remix)"	McCartney	2:56
