= Hello & Goodbye =

Studio album by Jump5
- Released: October 9, 2007
- Recorded: 2007
- Genres: Contemporary Christian, pop, pop rock
- Length: 30:58
- Label: Slanted

Jump5 chronology
Top 5 Hits (2006)	Hello & Goodbye (2007)	Christmas Like This (2007)

Singles from Hello & Goodbye
- 1. "Shoot the Moon" Released: 2007; 2. "Fly" Released: 2007; 3. "I Surrender All" Released: 2007

Professional ratings
Review scores
Source	Rating
CCM Magazine	4/5 stars
CBN.com	4/5 stars
The Phantom Tollbooth	2.5/5 stars
Jesusfreakhideout.com	4.5/5 stars

Hello & Goodbye is the seventh and final studio album by the Christian pop group Jump5. The album includes a cover of the Beatles' song "Hello, Goodbye" which former Jump5 member Libby Hodges performs guest vocals on, a cover of the Christian hymn "I Surrender All", a re-recorded version of "Throw Your Hands Up", and a recording of the U.S. national anthem.

== Track listing ==
No.	Title	Writer(s)	Length
1.	"Shoot the Moon"	Kenneth Hauptman, Christopher Bogan, Jeannie Lurie	3:36
2.	"Fly"	Aaron Rice, Jamie Moore, Cary Barlowe	2:33
3.	"Never Enough"	Alyssa Bonagura, Russ Keller, Chris Fedun, Brandon Hargest, Brittany Hargest, Lesley Moore	3:20
4.	"Hello, Goodbye" (featuring Libby Hodges)	Lennon–McCartney	2:56
5.	"I Surrender All"	Judson W. Van DeVenter, Winfield S. Weeden	4:01
6.	"Still Got Me"	Rice, Mike Payne, Fedun, Hargest, Hargest, L. Moore	2:54
7.	"Throw Your Hands Up (Slap Happy Symphonic Unmix)"	Mark Pennells, Zarc Porter	3:20
8.	"Fly (Erikson Remix)"	Rice, J. Moore, Barlowe	3:47
9.	"You"	Rice, J. Moore, Fedun, Hargest, Hargest, L. Moore	3:08
10.	"The Star-Spangled Banner"	Francis Scott Key, John Stafford Smith	1:27
