= Bread of Stone =

American band

- Origin: Sioux City, Iowa
- Genres: Contemporary Christian music, pop rock
- Years active: 2004–present
- Labels: Dream, BNY
- Members: Ben Kristijanto; Bill Kristijanto; Tim Barnes; Jason Ferris
- Past members: Wesley Holt
- Website: breadofstone.com

Bread of Stone are an American contemporary Christian music and pop rock band from Sioux City, Iowa, and they were formed in 2004. Their members are lead vocalist, Ben Kristijanto, guitarist, Bill Kristijanto, bass guitarist, Tim Barnes, and drummer, Jason Ferris. They released, The Real Life, with DREAM Records, and this album was reviewed by many Christian music publications. On June 29, 2022, the band announced that they would not be taking any bookings for "live performances."

== Background ==
The contemporary Christian music pop rock band formed in Sioux City, Iowa, in 2004. They count as their members; lead vocalist, Ben Kristijanto, guitarist, Bill Kristijanto, bass guitarist, Tim Barnes, and drummer, Jason Ferris. Their former drummer was Wesley Holt.

== Music history ==
The group was formed in 2004, yet their first major label released studio album wasn't released until 2013, The Real Life, by DREAM Records on September 24, 2013.

== Members ==
Current members

- Ben Kristijanto – lead vocals
- Bill Kristijanto – guitar
- Tim Barnes – Bass
- Jason Ferris – drums

Former members

- Wesley Holt – drums
- Jimmy Klemish - Bass

== Discography ==
Studio albums

- Broken Vessels (May 5, 2004, Independent)
- Letting Go (April 20, 2007, Independent)
- The Real Life (October 29, 2012, Independent; September 24, 2013, DREAM)
- Not Alone (February 24, 2015, BNY)
- Hold The Light (July 1, 2016, BNY)
- Details EP (March 22, 2019, BNY)

EPs

- Saturate EP (July 27, 2010, Independent)
