= Jump5 =

American Christian pop group (1999–2007)

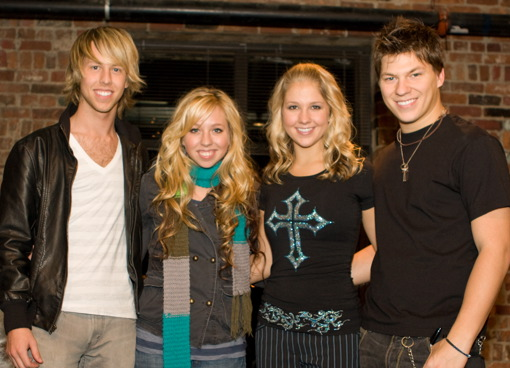
- Jump5 in December 2007

Background information
- Origin: Nashville, Tennessee, U.S.
- Genres: Pop; dance-pop; pop rock; teen pop; CCM
- Years active: 1999–2007
- Labels: Sparrow, Nevaeh, Slanted
- Past members: Brandon Hargest; Brittany Hargest; Chris Fedun; Lesley Moore; Libby Hodges; Natasha Noack

Jump5 was an American Christian teen pop group active from 1999 until 2007. The group was made up of five members from Nashville: Brandon and Brittany Hargest, Chris Fedun, Lesley Moore, and Libby Hodges. After Libby Hodges left in 2004, Natasha Noack joined the group temporarily, but the group eventually set on with the four remaining members. In December 2007, the group separated.

The group released five traditional studio albums together with two Christmas albums. Five of them reached the top 20 of the Billboard Top Christian Albums chart.

== History ==
Jump5 released their self-titled debut album on August 14, 2001. The album was re-released twice, first with an additional bonus track, then with a cover of Lee Greenwood's "God Bless the USA" after the September 11th attacks. Over the following two years they released three more albums: All the Time in the World, a Christmas album, All the Joy in the World, and Accelerate.

They opened for Aaron Carter in 2002.

In January 2004, Hodges decided to leave the group as she wanted to "take a deep breath and see what exactly God wants me to do at this point in my life". In April, the group released the remix album Mix It Up. Natasha Noack joined the group and took part in recording a cover of the J. Geils Band's "Freeze Frame" for the Sleepover soundtrack. Noack left the group in June 2004.

On September 21, 2004, the group released Dreaming in Color, their first release as a quartet.

In 2005 they recorded Radio The World but it was never released.

Instead, on March 15, 2005, a greatest hits album, The Very Best of Jump5, was released. The group subsequently parted ways with Sparrow Records and released their next album, Rock This Christmas on November 22, 2005, independently, under Nevaeh Records.

The song "Both to Blame" was released for online streaming on November 30, 2006.

On October 9, 2007, Jump5 released their final studio album, Hello & Goodbye, through Slanted Records. It included the titular song, "Hello, Goodbye", which was recorded with former Jump5 member Libby Hodges. Jump5 also embarked on a final tour for the album.

Christmas Like This was digitally released on November 20, 2007, and featured 10 of the 11 songs from Rock This Christmas (eight songs are remixed or re-recorded, two songs are kept in the original release version).

Jump5 officially disbanded on December 16, 2007.

== Discography ==
- Jump5 (2001)
- All the Time in the World (2002)
- All the Joy in the World (2002)
- Accelerate (2003)
- Mix It Up (2004)
- Dreaming in Color (2004)
- Rock This Christmas (2005)
- Hello & Goodbye (2007)
