= Michelle Tumes =

Australian singer (born 1971)

- Born: Michelle Louise Tumes; 1971 (age 54–55); Adelaide, South Australia, Australia
- Genre: Contemporary Christian music
- Occupation: Musician
- Instruments: Vocals; piano
- Labels: Sparrow Records, Levantar Records

Michelle Louise Tumes (born 1971) is an Australian contemporary Christian performer from Adelaide. In 1993, she moved to the United States and she released four studio albums, Listen (1998), Center of My Universe (2000), Dream (2001) and Michelle Tumes (2006).

== Career ==
Tumes was born in 1971 and grew up in Adelaide. She has a younger sister and a younger brother. She participated in school plays, was in choir, and as a child sang at lunchtime in the schoolyard for her classmates. She learned piano from the age of four and as a teenager went to a "special music school" in her words for two years. Tumes grew up Baptist however as a teen she was part of a charismatic church. Her father was a minister and she got involved in playing worship music for church when she was 10 or 11. Occasionally she would "do an item" (perform a special) at church. She went to a university (uni) in Australia studying dentistry. "In Australia you go straight into your course, you don't do an under-grad", she said. "Then, I did a demo on the side." Her 11 year old sister contributed $40 which she earned from a paper route for the demo tape to be recorded.

She also has studied law for a year. A general manager with BMG Australia eventually told her that he would sign her. At 22, she moved to Nashville. She turned down a record label deal in town. "I told them, I'm sorry, I can't do that because I feel I have a style... and I don't want anyone to influence me, I guess that's an example of standing up for myself. It was hard, but I'm glad I did it. The most important thing about all of this is the music, and what's behind the music." Tumes has often referenced how as a child she would rather sing in front of a crowd than in smaller settings. She grew up being somewhat shy and going to the music school (with students who became distinguished musicians including one who later performed with the Vienna Philharmonic in Vienna, Austria) she experienced nervousness.

She wrote a song for Point of Grace ("Rain Down on Me"), then co-wrote "If This World" for Jaci Velasquez. Tumes also wrote "Do Ya" and co-wrote "In My Heart" for Jump5 (Do Ya). Tumes went on tour with Velasquez, Out of the Grey, Twila Paris, 4Him, and Fernando Ortega. In 1997 she signed with Sparrow Records and her debut album, Listen, was released in 1998. Tumes' music is frequently played on radio stations in its genre worldwide. Her style is a blend of soft acoustic pop with an ethereal element. She appeared on the Thomas Kinkade 2001 album, Music of Light, with Rob Mathes and Bill Miller. It included her 1998 hit song, "Healing Waters", which was co-written by Tumes with Matt Huseman of The Greenberry Woods; Huseman lives in Franklin, Tennessee. Tumes composed and performed songs for the movie No Greater Love. A friend of hers performed with Sting "for a long time" and Sting as well as U2 have been influences of Tumes. Her songs have been compared to Enya, Loreena McKennitt, and Sarah McLachlan's music.

Tumes talked about how she incorporated certain drumbeats and references from classical music (especially Bach and Tchaikovksy) in her songs. A producer who worked with her, Charlie Peacock, spoke of how she is well versed in neo-classical music. Peacock referenced Handel and Bach in addition to Tumes saying that their music is representative of the best in Christian music. Listen was recorded over a period of two years and four of seven songs she began writing a year into the making of the album are on the album. She says "Heal" is one of her favorite songs from the recording. While in a Santa Clarita, California church parking lot in 2008 and 2009, a man who worked for Disney asked her if she recorded demos. That led to her working with him and "20 other" writers and individuals on "Fly to Your Heart" from Tinker Bell and the Lost Treasure. Selena Gomez sang the song for the film.

From 2015 to March 2023 she was the music director at Calvary Community Church (she called it a mini-mega church) in Westlake Village, California. A highlight from her time there she says was working with performers who were studying at the Malibu, California campus of Pepperdine University. She left the position in March 2023.

== Personal life ==
Tumes and Douglas Higgins, a music engineer who also works in film and television, married on 26 December 1999 and they have three children. They left Nashville in 2001. She signed with Warner Chappell Music (working on music for Alessandro Safina) and also wrote two songs for Jump5. She and Aaron Benward (a singer-songwriter who is an executive producer on God. Family. Football.) are making a film about Brush Creek Academy in Jay, Oklahoma, northeast of Tulsa, winning the eight-man football state championship.

== Discography ==
=== Albums ===
Studio albums

- Listen (1998, Sparrow Records)
- Center of My Universe (2000, Sparrow Records)
- Dream (2001, Sparrow Records)
- Michelle Tumes (2006, Levantar Records)

Compilations and EPs

- Very Best of Michelle Tumes (2006, Sparrow Records)
- Christmas Is Here (2007, Levantar Records)
- Greatest Hits (2008, EMI CMG Label Group)

=== Other appearances ===
- Hear and Beyond, Various Artists ("Listen"), 1996
- Experiencing God, Various Artists ("All Your Works Are Wonderful"), 1998
- Listen to Our Hearts Vol. 1, Various Artists ("What a Wondrous Love Is This" and "Heaven Will Be Near Me"), 1998
- Get Real Music Sampler, Various Artists ("Heaven Will Be Near Me"), 1998
- Heaven and Earth: A Tapestry of Worship, Various Artists ("For the Glory of Your Name" and "My Dwelling Place"), 1999
- To Have & To Hold: 15 Songs of Love & Marriage, Various Artists ("My Constant Love"), 1999
- Streams, Various Artists ("Hold On"), 1999
- Thomas Kinkade: Music of Light (features Rob Mathes and Tumes), 2000
- Keep The Faith 2000, Various Artists ("He's Watching Over You"), 2000
- The Mercy Project, Various Artists ("Sanctuary"), 2000
- Hear It First New Music Sampler, Various Artists ("Dream"), 2001
- Your Love Broke Through: The Worship Songs of Keith Green, Various Artists ("There Is a Redeemer"), 2002
- Lost in Wonder: Voices of Worship (features Tumes, Susan Ashton, and Christine Dente from Out of the Grey), 2005
- The Wonderful Cross, Various Artists ("In Christ Alone" and "Beautiful Savior (All My Days)"), 2007
- 90's Ultimate Collection, Various Artists ("For the Glory of Your Name"), 2007
- The Worship Lounge, Various Artists ("Your Love Falls Down"), 2008
- Worship for the Evening, Various Artists ("For the Glory of Your Name" and "Love Falls Down"), 2008
- Be Still & Know: Peaceful Voices for Quite Moments Various Artists ("Christ of Hope"), 2009
- Meditate & Worship, Various Artists ("He's Watching Over You"), 2009
- No Greater Love (Soundtrack), 2009
