= Slanted Records =

- Parent company: Spring Hill Music Group
- Founded: 2004
- Genre: Contemporary Christian music, progressive rock, modern rock
- Country of origin: United States
- Location: Brentwood, Tennessee
- Official website: slantedrecords.com

Slanted Records was a contemporary Christian record label based in Brentwood, Tennessee. As part of the Spring Hill Music Group, Slanted Records signed Contemporary Christian artists whose music can be described as progressive rock or modern rock. Slanted Records started in 2004 with three bands. The label was shut down and the website went dark in late 2012/early 2013.

== Artists ==
Former

- Decemberadio
- Detour 180
- Nate Huss
- New Endingz ( James, Robert, Caesar, Frankie, Kyle)
- After Edmund (Disbanded)
- Caleb Rowden (Active, currently unsigned)
- Inhabited (Active, currently unsigned)
- Jump5 (Disbanded)

== See also ==
- List of contemporary Christian music record labels
- List of record labels
