= Angela D. Dillard =

American scholar and author

Angela Denise Dillard

Academic background
- Education: Michigan (Ph.D., M.A.); New School for Social Research (M.A.); Michigan State University (B.A.)
- Thesis: From the Reverend Charles A. Hill to the Reverend Albert B. Cleage, Jr.: Change and continuity in the patterns of civil rights mobilizations in Detroit, 1935-1967 (1995)
- Doctoral advisor: Earl Lewis; Robin Kelley

Academic work
- Discipline: American Culture scholar
- Institutions: University of Michigan (2009–); New York University; University of Minnesota
- Notable works: Faith in the City: Preaching Radical Social Change in Detroit religion and political radicalism in Detroit from the 1930s to the 1960s (2007)

Angela Denise Dillard is the Earl Lewis Professor of Afroamerican and African Studies and associate dean for undergraduate education at the University of Michigan's College of Literature, Science and the Arts. She was an associate professor of history and politics at New York University's Gallatin School of Individualized Study. Her work specializes in American and African-American intellectual history including issues of race, religion, and politics.

Dillard was appointed as the vice provost for undergraduate education at the University of Michigan in 2024.

== Education ==
Dillard completed a Ph.D. in American culture at the University of Michigan in 1995. Her dissertation, From the Reverend Charles A. Hill to the Reverend Albert B. Cleage, Jr.: Change and continuity in the patterns of civil rights mobilizations in Detroit, 1935-1967, was supervised by Earl Lewis and Robin Kelley. She also has an M.A. from the University of Michigan in American culture, an M.A. from the New School for Social Research in political theory, and a B.A. from Michigan State University in justice, morality, and constitutional democracy.

== Works ==
Dillard wrote Faith in the City: Preaching Radical Social Change in Detroit religion and political radicalism in Detroit from the 1930s to the 1960s. She also wrote Guess who's coming to dinner now?, a critical study of conservative political thought among African Americans, Latinos, women and homosexuals. Scott L. Malcomson reviewed Guess who's coming to dinner now? for The New York Times Book Review and described it as timely after the election of George W. Bush as U.S. president and his efforts to maintain a diverse cabinet and staff of Conservatives.

Dillard has published works in The New York Times, The Washington Post, Dissent, and the Chronicle of Higher Education, and has appeared as a guest on television and radio programs.

== Bibliography ==
- Faith in the City: Preaching Radical Social Change in Detroit, U of Michigan Press, 2007
- Guess Who’s Coming to Dinner Now?: Multicultural Conservatism in America (NYU, 2001)
- "Adventures in conservative feminism", Society, March 2005, Volume 42, Issue 3, pp 25–27, doi:10.1007/BF02802982
