= American Gothic =

1930 painting by Grant Wood

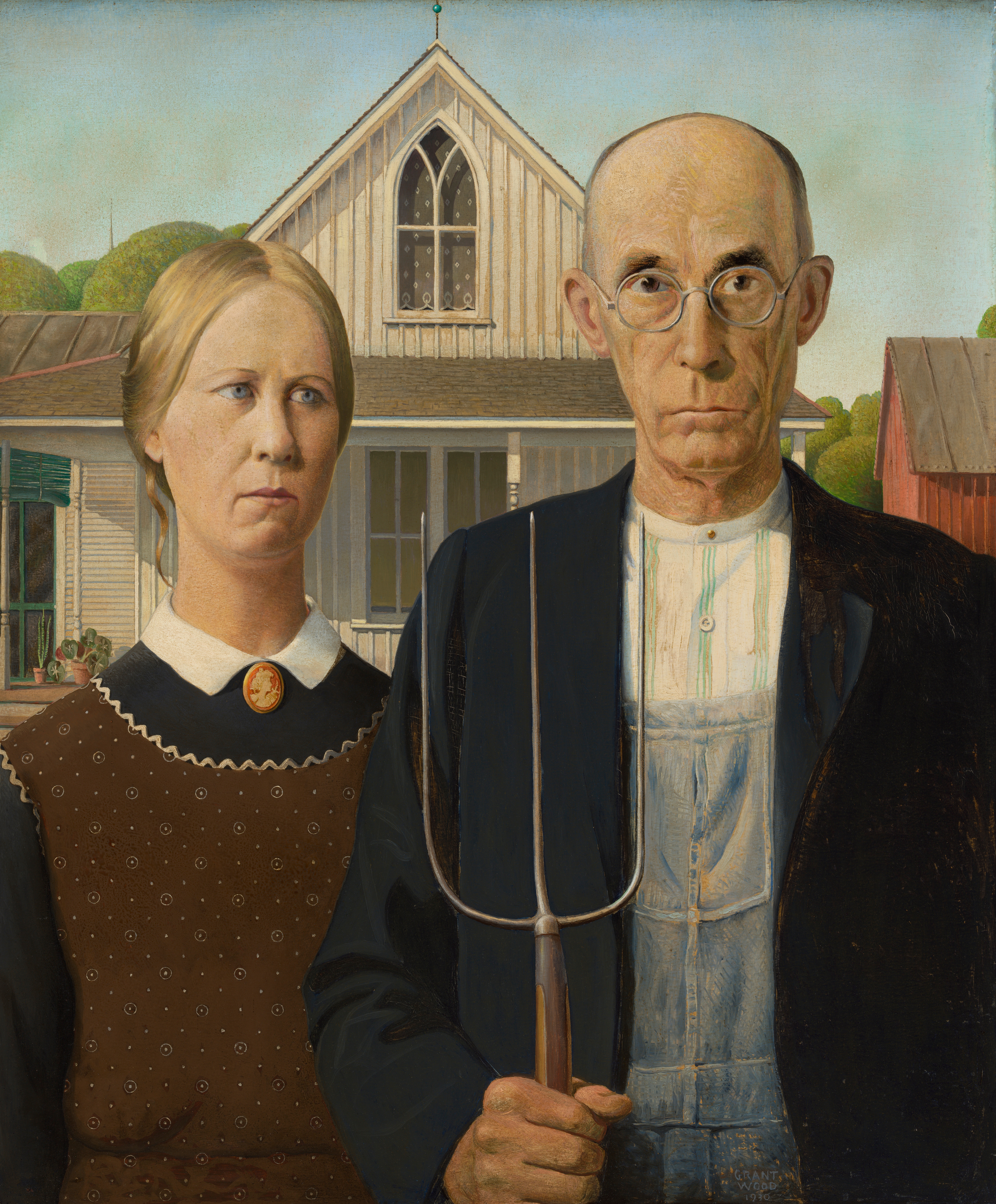
- Artist: Grant Wood
- Year: 1930
- Type: Oil on beaverboard
- Dimensions: 78 cm × 65.3 cm (30 3/4 in × 25 3/4 in)
- Location: Art Institute of Chicago, Chicago

American Gothic is a 1930 oil painting on beaverboard by the American Regionalist artist Grant Wood, depicting a Midwestern farmer and his daughter standing in front of their Carpenter Gothic style home. It is one of the most famous American paintings of the 20th century and is frequently referenced in popular culture.

Wood was inspired to paint what is now known as the American Gothic House in Eldon, Iowa, along with "the kind of people [he] fancied should live in that house".

The figures were modeled after Wood's sister Nan Wood Graham and Byron McKeeby, the Wood family's dentist. The woman is dressed in a colonial print apron evoking 20th-century rural Americana while the man is adorned in overalls covered by a suit jacket and carries a pitchfork. The plants on the porch of the house are mother-in-law's tongue and beefsteak begonia, which also appear in Wood's 1929 portrait of his mother, Woman with Plants.

From 2016 to 2017, the painting was displayed in Paris at the Musée de l'Orangerie and in London at the Royal Academy of Arts, in its first showings outside the United States. The painting is in the collection of the Art Institute of Chicago.

== Creation ==
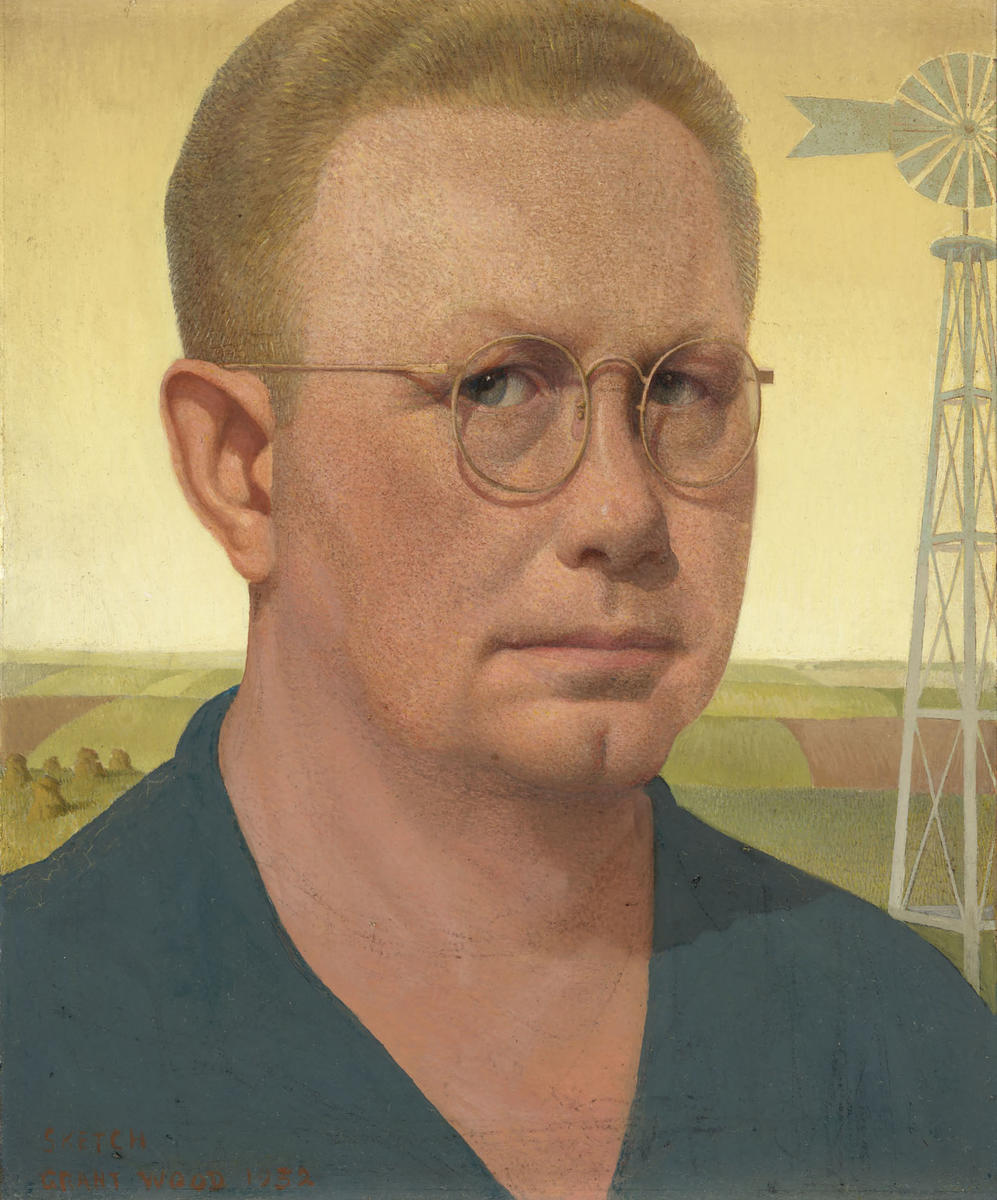
Grant Wood, Self-portrait, 1932, Figge Art Museum

In August 1930, Grant Wood, an American painter with European training, was driven around Eldon, Iowa, by a young local painter named John Sharp. Looking for inspiration, he noticed the Dibble House, a small white house built in the Carpenter Gothic architectural style. The house was added to the National Register of Historic Places in 1974 (reference No. 74002291). Sharp's brother suggested in 1973 that it was on this drive that Wood first sketched the house on the back of an envelope. Wood's earliest biographer, Darrell Garwood, noted that Wood "thought it a form of borrowed pretentiousness, a structural absurdity, to put a Gothic-style window in such a flimsy frame house".

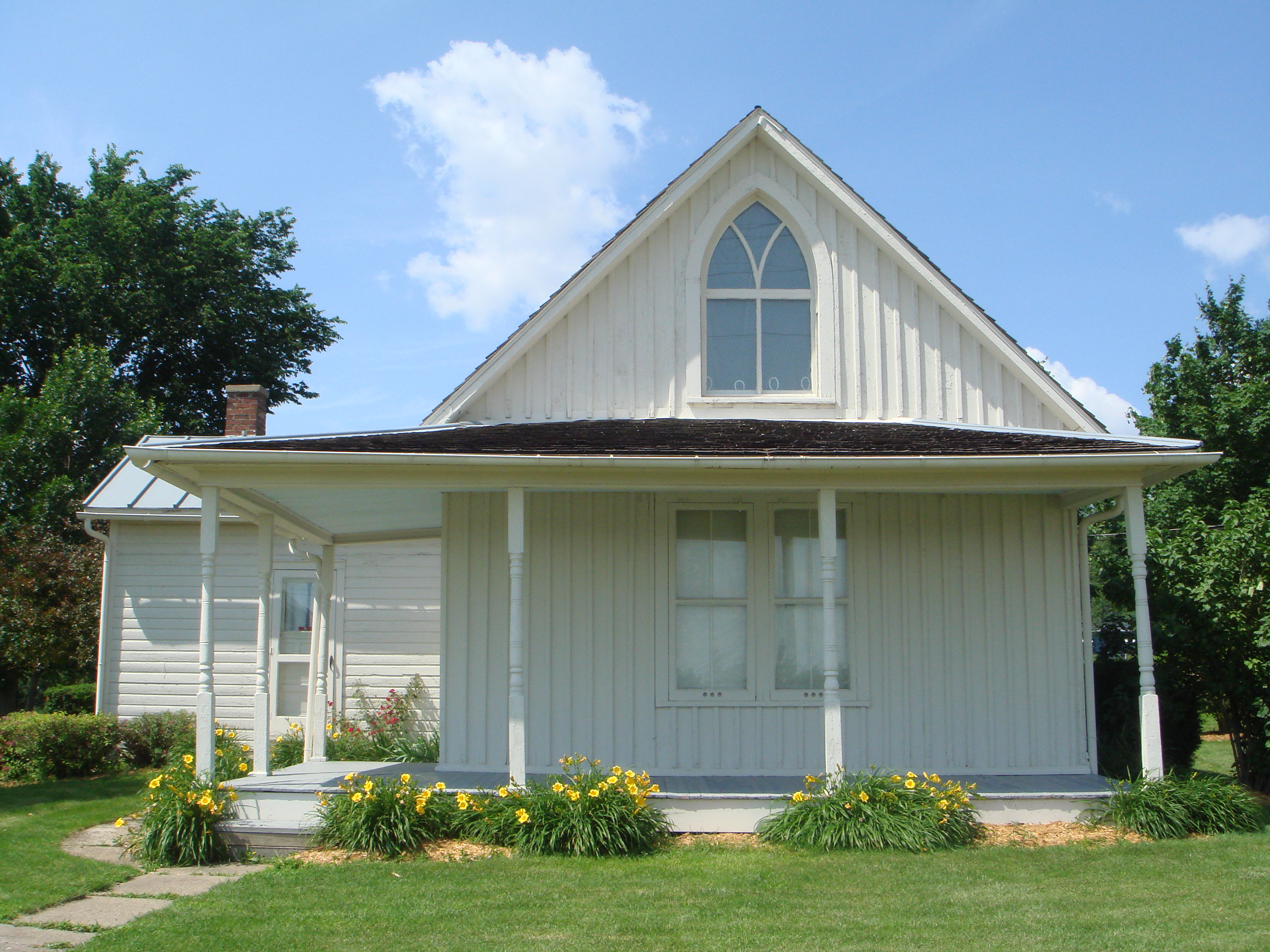
The Dibble House, Eldon, Iowa

At the time, Wood classified it as one of the "cardboardy frame houses on Iowa farms" and considered it "very paintable". After obtaining permission from the house's owners, Selma Jones-Johnston and her family, Wood made a sketch the next day in oil paint on paperboard from the front yard. This sketch depicted a steeper roof and a longer window with a more pronounced ogive than on the actual house – features which eventually adorned the final work.

Wood decided to paint the house along with, in his words, "the kind of people [he] fancied should live in that house". His sister, Nan (1899–1990), acted as the model for the woman, dressed in a colonial-print apron mimicking 20th-century rural Americana. In preparation, Wood requested that she make the apron herself and include rickrack trim to better reflect the period. As rickrack was no longer available in stores, Nan removed trim from their mother Hattie's old dresses to apply to the apron. The model for the man was the Wood family's dentist, Dr. Byron McKeeby (1867–1950) from Cedar Rapids, Iowa.

The painting was reproduced in U.S. newspapers, often with the caption An Iowa Farmer and His Wife. Nan told people that her brother had envisioned the pair as father and daughter, not husband and wife; Wood himself was vague about the issue until 1941 when he stated in a letter to a Mrs. Nellie Sudduth that "The prim lady with him is his grown-up daughter."

Elements of the painting stress the vertical that is associated with Gothic architecture. The upright, three-pronged pitchfork is echoed in the stitching of the man's overalls and shirt, the Gothic pointed-arch window of the house under the steeped roof, and the structure of the man's face. However, Wood did not add figures to his sketch until he returned to his studio in Cedar Rapids. Moreover, he would not return to Eldon again, although he did request a photograph of the home to complete his painting.

== Reception and interpretation ==
Wood entered the painting in a competition at the Art Institute of Chicago. One judge deemed it a "comic valentine", but a museum patron persuaded the jury to award the painting the bronze medal and a $300 cash prize. The same patron also persuaded the Art Institute to buy the painting, and it remains part of the Chicago museum's collection. The image soon began to be reproduced in newspapers, first by the Chicago Evening Post, and then in New York, Boston, Kansas City, and Indianapolis. However, when the image finally appeared in the Cedar Rapids Gazette, there was a backlash. Iowans were furious at their depiction as "pinched, grim-faced, puritanical Bible-thumpers". Wood, who had done some of his study in Paris, protested, saying that he had not painted a caricature of Iowans, but rather a depiction of his appreciation, stating "I had to go to France to appreciate Iowa." In a 1941 letter, Wood said that, "In general, I have found, the people who resent the painting are those who feel that they themselves resemble the portrayal."

Art critics who had favorable opinions about the painting, such as Gertrude Stein and Christopher Morley, similarly assumed the painting was meant to be a satire of rural small-town life. It was thus seen as part of the trend toward increasingly critical depictions of rural America along the lines of, in literature, Sherwood Anderson's 1919 novel Winesburg, Ohio, Sinclair Lewis's 1920 Main Street, and Carl Van Vechten's 1924 The Tattooed Countess.

However, with the deepening of the Great Depression not too long after the painting was made, American Gothic came to be seen as a depiction of the steadfast American pioneer spirit. Wood assisted this interpretive transition by renouncing his bohemian youth in Paris and grouping himself with populist Midwestern painters such as John Steuart Curry and Thomas Hart Benton, who revolted against the dominance of East Coast art circles. Wood was quoted in this period as stating, "All the good ideas I've ever had came to me while I was milking a cow." Wood intended the painting to depict the farmer and his daughter as survivors, to pay homage to the strength of the rural community, and to provide reassurance in a time of great economic upset.

American art historian Wanda M. Corn thinks that Wood was not painting a modern couple, but rather one of the past, pointing to the fact that Wood directed the models to wear old-fashioned clothing which he found inspiration for by consulting his family photo album. Wood even posed the figures in a way that resembled long-exposure photographs of Midwestern families that dated before World War I.

Art historian Tripp Evans interpreted it in 2010 as an "old-fashioned mourning portrait ... Tellingly, the curtains hanging in the windows of the house, both upstairs and down, are pulled closed in the middle of the day, a mourning custom in Victorian America. The woman wears a black dress beneath her apron, and glances away as if holding back tears. One imagines she is grieving for the man beside her." Wood had been only 10 when his father died, and later he lived for a decade "above a garage reserved for hearses", and it's possible these experiences influenced him.

In 2019, culture writer Kelly Grovier described the painting as a portrait of Pluto and Proserpina, the Roman gods of the underworld (a comparison made earlier by American writer Guy Davenport in his analysis of the painting in a 1978 lecture, "The Geography of the Imagination"). Grovier suggests the small globe on the weather vane at the very top of the painting represents the dwarf planet Pluto (the planet was famously discovered in 1930 around the time of the painting's creation). Grovier interprets the pitchfork-wielding farmer as the guardian of the gates of hell, Pluto, and points to the woman's cameo brooch, containing a classical representation of the mythological goddess, Proserpina, and the dangling strand of hair by the woman's right ear as representing the ravishing in the goddess's myth. Davenport took the inspiration back even further, while seeing similarities to Northern Renaissance paintings of married couples, according to Davenport, American Gothic recalls, "the Egyptian prince Rahotep, holding the flail of Osiris, beside his wife Nufrit—strict with pious rectitude, poised in absolute dignity, mediators between heaven and earth, givers of grain, obedient to the gods."

== Parodies and other cultural references ==
The Depression-era understanding of the painting as depicting an authentically American scene prompted the first well-known parody, a 1942 photo by Gordon Parks taken in Washington, D.C. of charwoman Ella Watson.

The painting's copyright was never renewed, which led to it entering the public domain in 1958. This has contributed to its several parodies and cultural relevance. It has been lampooned in Broadway shows such as The Music Man, movies such as The Rocky Horror Picture Show, and television shows such as Green Acres (in the final scene of the opening credits), The Dick Van Dyke Show episode "The Masterpiece", the Pee-Wee's Playhouse episode "Miss Yvonne's Visit", the Arthur episode "Binky Barnes, Art Expert", The Simpsons episode "Bart Gets an Elephant", various SpongeBob SquarePants episodes, and the opening sequence of King of the Hill. It has also been parodied in marketing campaigns and pornography, and by couples who recreate the image photographically by facing a camera in the same way, one of them holding a pitchfork or other object in its place. The painting famously appears in the opening titles of the television show Desperate Housewives (2004–2012). In 2023, Google released a commercial for their smartphone depicting a father and daughter recreating the scene at the original house. It also includes similar poses in numerous other settings, including in wet suits, dressed as skeletons, camping and in ski suits.

This work was featured on 100 Great Paintings.

== See also ==
- Protestant work ethic – Social-theologic concept
- Southern Gothic – Subgenre of Gothic fiction
