= A Woman of the World =

1925 film

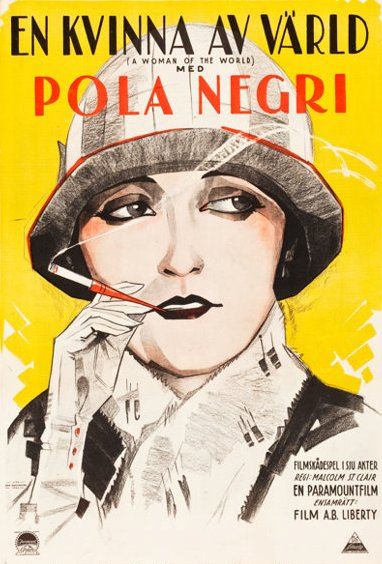
- Swedish film poster
- Directed by: Mal St. Clair
- Written by: Pierre Collings; Morris Ryskind (intertitles)
- Based on: The Tattooed Countess by Carl Van Vechten
- Produced by: Adolph Zukor; Jesse L. Lasky
- Starring: Pola Negri; Holmes Herbert; Charles Emmett Mack; Chester Conklin; Dot Farley
- Cinematography: Bert Glennon
- Production company: Famous Players–Lasky
- Distributed by: Paramount Pictures
- Release date: December 28, 1925
- Running time: 79 minutes
- Country: United States
- Language: Silent (English intertitles)

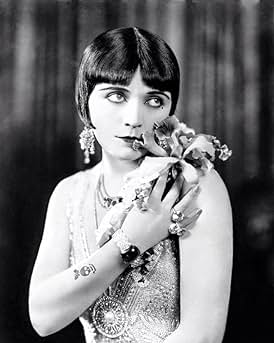
Pola Negri, publicity photo from A Woman of the World (1925)

A Woman of the World is a 1925 American silent comedy-drama film starring Pola Negri, directed by Mal St. Clair, produced by Famous Players–Lasky, and distributed by Paramount Pictures.

== Plot ==
As described in a review in a film magazine, Countess Natatorini leaves France seeking to forget a faithless lover by visiting her distant American cousin Sam Poore and his wife Lou in their Midwestern home. Richard Granger, newly elected district attorney and crusading reformer, shocked when he sees her violating the town social norms he is enforcing by smoking a cigarette in public, finds that he is strongly attracted to her. At a community meeting, the Countess finds that the townspeople are selling the right to talk to a real Countess at a quarter a head, and her annoyance builds when one curious old man offers to donate another quarter if she will show the tattoo mark that is the ineradicable reminder of the faithless foreign lover she wants to forget. Later, Sam seeks to console her and brings her laughter by showing that he has a railroad train tattoo running from his right wrist to his left hand, clear across his chest. After a series of innocent events between the Countess and his assistant Gareth Johns arouses his jealousy, Richard denounces her alleged immorality and demands that she be ordered out of town. She avenges the insult with a horsewhip she gets from Lou, but when she draws blood from Richard she forgets all but her love, and we last see the pair in a hack on the way to the train station and the honeymoon, and he offers her the cigarettes he once denounced so strongly.

== Cast ==
- Pola Negri as Countess Elenora Natatorini
- Holmes Herbert as Richard Granger
- Charles Emmett Mack as Gareth Johns
- Chester Conklin as Sam Poore
- Blanche Mehaffey as Lennie Porter
- Guy Oliver as Judge Porter
- Lucille Ward as Lou Poore
- Dot Farley as Mrs. Fox
- May Foster as Mrs. Bierbauer
- Dorothea Wolbert as Annie
- Robert Dudley as French-Speaking Party Guest (uncredited)
- Fred Gamble as Townsman (uncredited)
- Anthony Jowitt as Unfaithful Lover (uncredited)

== Production ==
A Woman of the World as adapted from the 1924 sophisticated romance novel The Tattooed Countess by Carl Van Vechten. Paramount executives encouraged and rewarded innovation regarding adaptations of literary works or stage productions. As such, scenarist Pierre Collings and director Malcolm St. Clair overhauled the original story. Rather than a countess in her early fifties, Pola Negri's character is that of a beautiful young woman, though she retains her tattoos; rather than a serious dramatic romance, A Woman of the World is decidedly a comedic, but with a sophisticated Lubitsch touch typical of Paramount productions.

== Theme ==
“The sumptuous sophisticated comedies such as A Woman of the World in some respects may seem dated in spite of their visual beauty. In keeping with the genre they are thin of plot and appealed to contemporary sensibility which was dazzled by richly lavish sets, costumes, and ‘decadent’ behavior…”—Film Historian Ruth Anne Dwyer in Malcolm St. Clair: His Films, 1915-1948 (1996)

A Woman of the World is typical of St. Clair's treatment of romantic themes in which “the plot hinges on the fact that there are fundamental differences” distinguishing Europeans vs. Americans “in the way they approach love and life.”

Most of the humor of this “sophisticated comedy” derives from the collision between European upper-class cosmopolitan culture and American midwestern provincialism and its challenge to the latter's social and gender norms. The conflicting worlds of the decadent patrician and the principled plebeian are reconciled when the countess marries the small town prosecutor, and they remain in the fictional town of Maple Valley, Iowa.
