= American Gothic House =

Listed house in Iowa

- Dibble House
- U.S. National Register of Historic Places
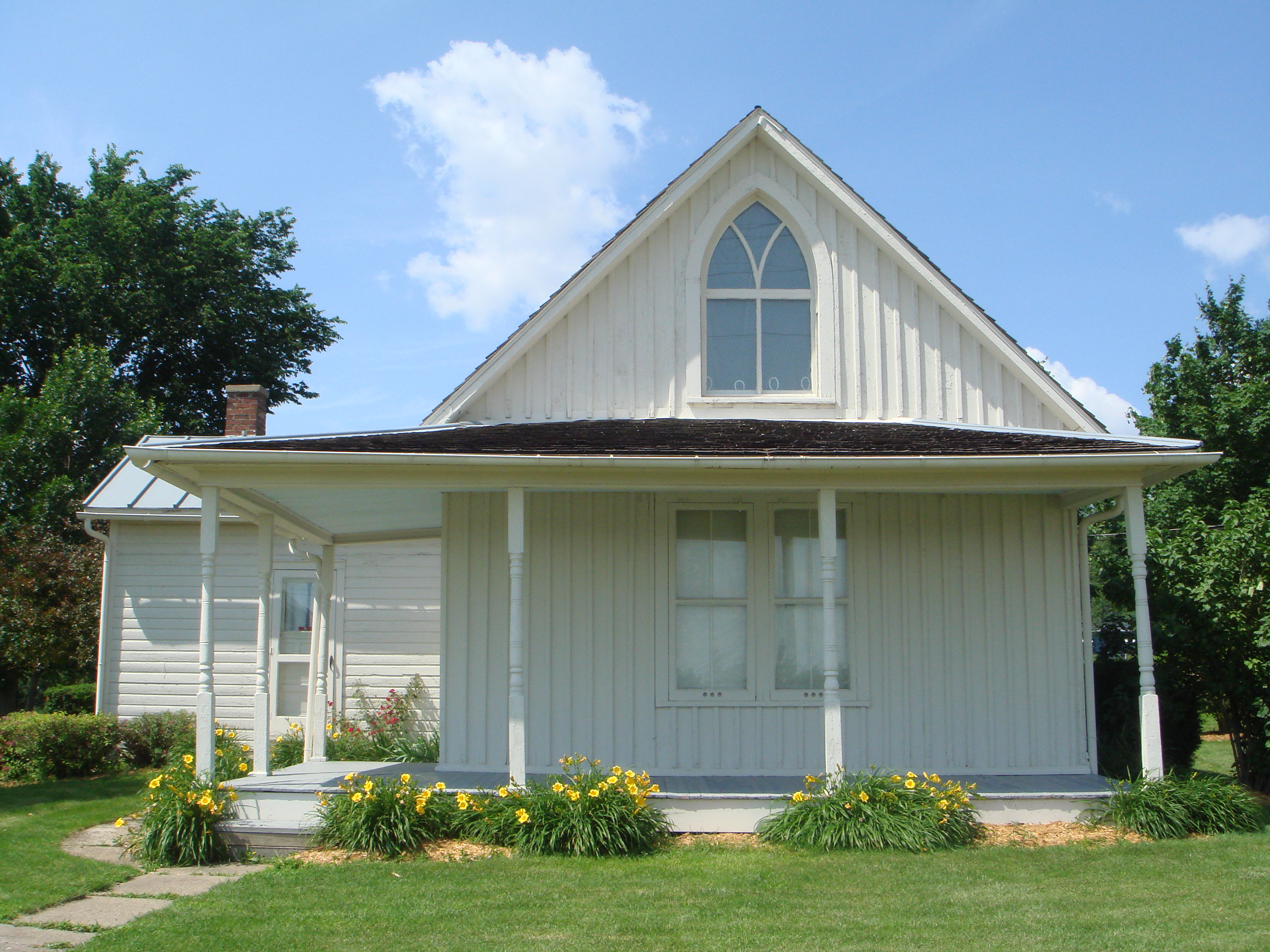

- Location within Iowa
- Interactive map showing the American Gothic House’s location
- Location: 300 American Gothic Street Eldon, Iowa
- Coordinates: 40°55′17″N 92°12′49″W
- Area: 504 sq ft (46.8 m^{2}) (house).92 acres (0.37 ha) (lot)
- Built: 1881–1882
- Architect: Bussy and Herald (local carpenters)
- Architectural style: Carpenter Gothic
- NRHP reference No.: 74002291
- Added to NRHP: October 1, 1974

The American Gothic House, also known as the Dibble House, is a house in Eldon, Iowa, designed in the Carpenter Gothic style with a distinctive upper window. It was the backdrop of the 1930 painting American Gothic by Grant Wood, generally considered Wood's most famous work and among the most recognized paintings in twentieth century American art. Wood, who observed the house only twice in his lifetime, made only an initial sketch of the house—he completed American Gothic at his studio in Cedar Rapids.

First owned by Eldon resident Charles Dibble after its construction in 1881–82, the house remained (with one 1897 exception) a private residence well into the late twentieth century. A thirty‑year preservation effort culminated in 1991, when the property was donated to the State Historical Society of Iowa and developed as a historic house museum with a visitors center. The house, listed on the National Register of Historic Places in 1974, is preserved in its 1930 appearance.

== Early history and architecture ==
Charles A. Dibble (born 1836 in Saratoga County, New York), by various accounts a railroad man, livery stable owner, and Civil War veteran, lived in Eldon in the late nineteenth century. He and his wife, Catharine, began building the house in 1881 for themselves and their eight children. Its relatively simple board-and-batten siding, white color, and moderate size—just 504 square feet (46.8 m^{2})—were quite common in nineteenth century Iowa architecture. A similar style can be observed in the birthplace of President Herbert Hoover in West Branch, built a decade before the American Gothic House, which features board-and-batten siding, a simple shingled roof, a central chimney, white color, and a moderate size as well. Exterior features of the house include its two Gothic windows in the gable and its steep-pitched roof. Both features would later be exaggerated by Grant Wood in American Gothic. The lower floor of the house contains three rooms and a bathroom, while the upper floor has two bedrooms. The house has been called the best-known example of a Carpenter Gothic cottage in the United States.

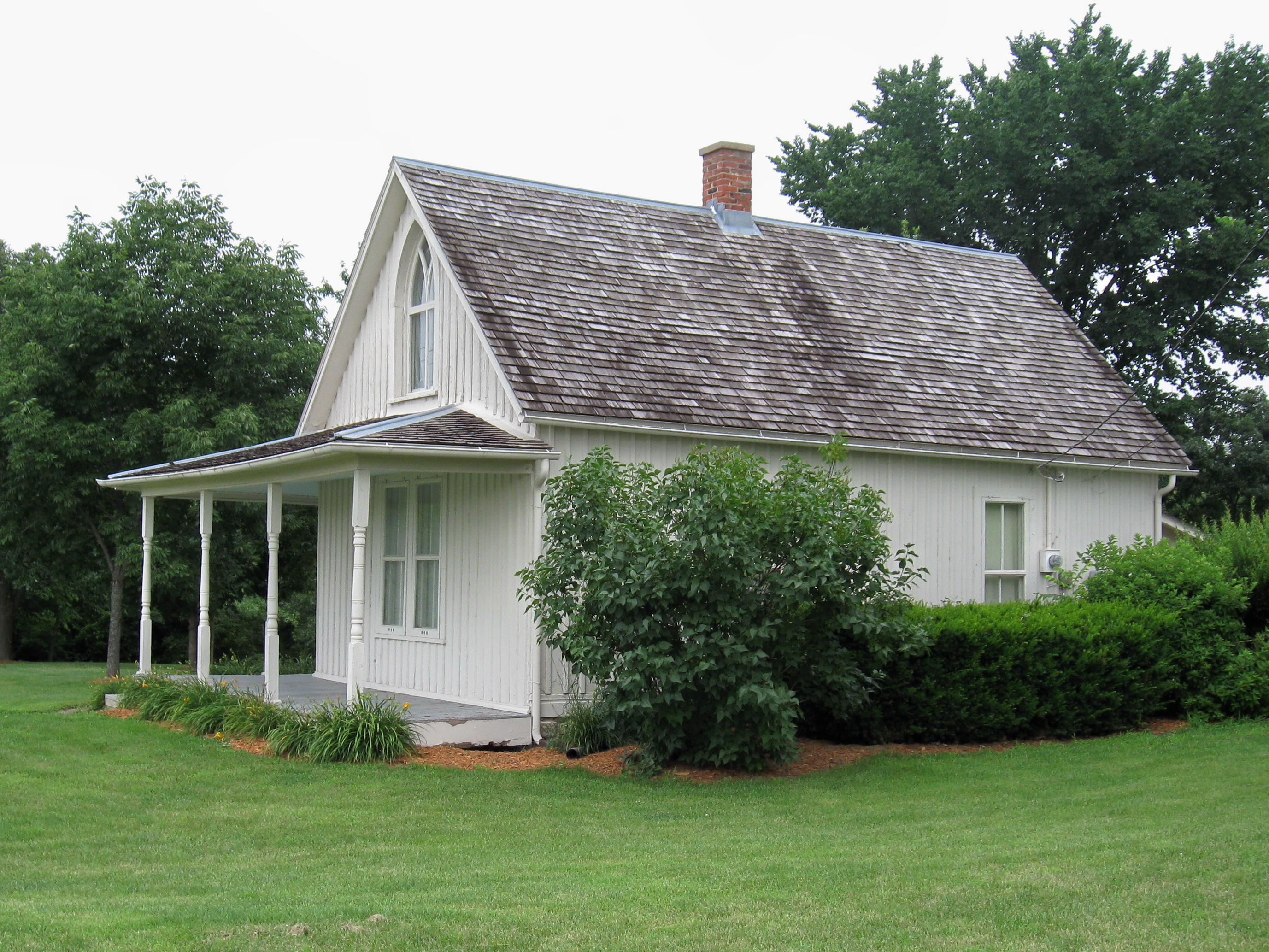
This side view evinces the modest size of the house; it also obscures most of the home's addition to give a glimpse of the original design.

There is no conclusive evidence explaining why the Dibbles chose to place Gothic windows on the upper level. The windows are believed to have been purchased through the Sears catalog. There are two commonly accepted theories: the Dibbles may have wanted the windows to beautify their home at a time when rural life in Iowa was a struggle, or they could have been following a trend in which extravagant details were desirable in residences in the late nineteenth century, and the Dibbles chose windows whose costs would have been relatively reasonable at the time.

The Dibbles' house was foreclosed around 1897 after they were unable to pay their taxes, and they are recorded as living in Portland, Oregon, in the 1900 Census. The house changed hands several times until 1917, when Gideon and Mary Hart Jones purchased it. The Jones family owned the house until 1933 (and notably added a kitchen which created the west wing of the house); thus, it was the Jones family who allowed Grant Wood to use their home as a backdrop for American Gothic.

== American Gothic ==
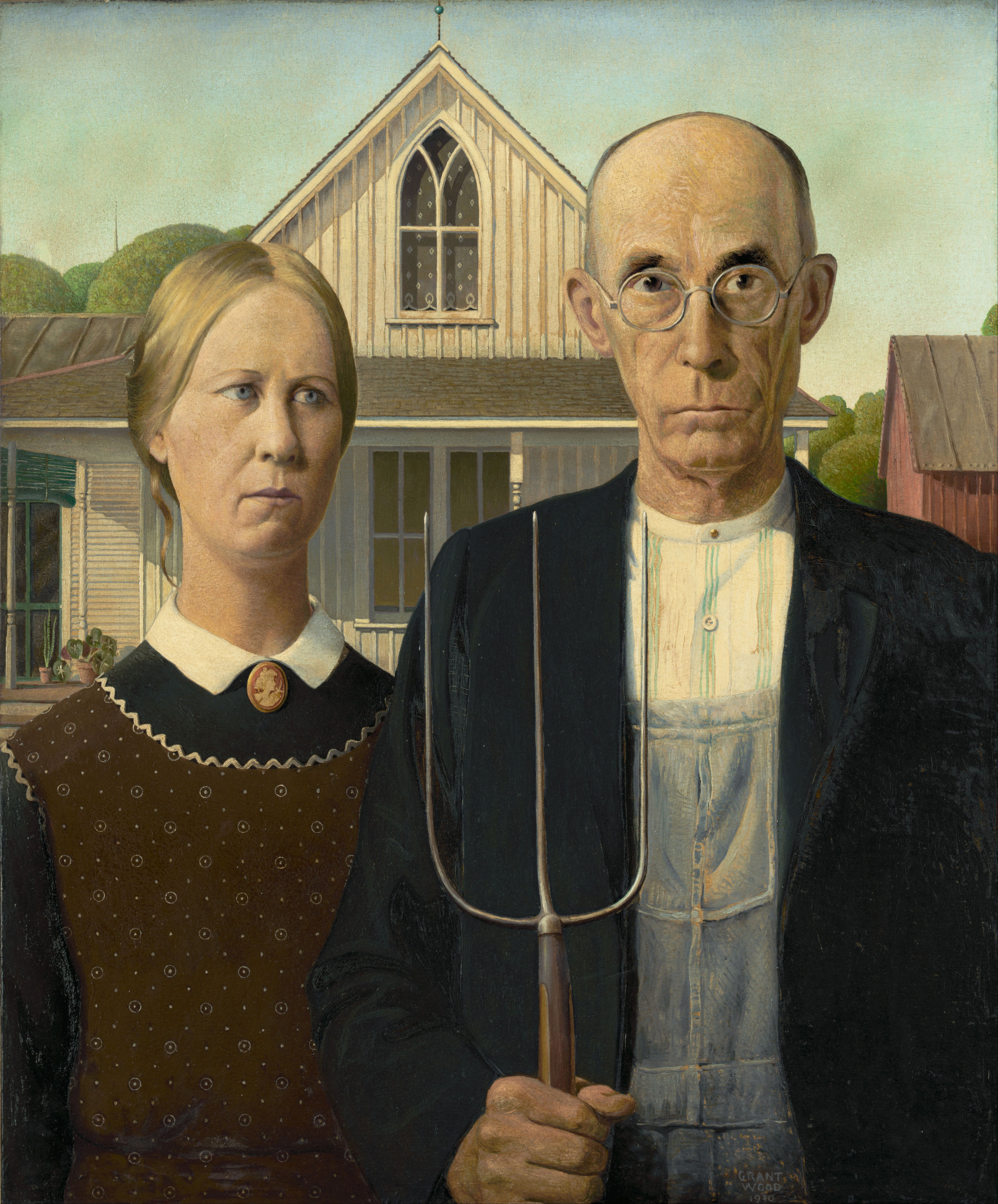
The house as depicted by Wood in his 1930 painting American Gothic

During the summer of 1930, Edward Rowan, a young gallery director from Cedar Rapids, a large city approximately 80 miles (130 km) to the northeast of Eldon, attempted to promote fine arts in the rural town by opening a gallery and library and leading art classes in Eldon. Rowan's attempts were met with success—the Eldon Forum called the exhibitions "an unusual treat." This, along with an indebtedness Wood felt toward Rowan, drew the painter (himself a native of Anamosa, Iowa) to come to Eldon.

In August, Wood was driven around the town by a young painter from Eldon, John Sharp, looking for inspiration. Sharp's brother suggested in 1973 that it was on this drive that Wood first sketched the house on the back of an envelope. Wood did not immediately regard the house as beautiful, but he did find it captivating. His earliest biographer, Darrell Garwood, noted that Wood "thought it a form of borrowed pretentiousness, a structural absurdity, to put a Gothic-style window in such a flimsy frame house." At the time, Wood classified it as one of the "cardboardy [sic] frame houses on Iowa farms" and considered it "very paintable." After obtaining the permission of the Jones family, Wood made a sketch the next day in oil on paperboard from the house's front yard. This sketch displayed a steeper roof and a longer window with a more pronounced ogive than the actual house, features which eventually adorned the final work; however, Wood did not add figures to the sketch until he returned to Cedar Rapids.

Although Wood never returned to Eldon, he did request a photograph of the home to complete his painting.

== Later history and current status ==
Decades after American Gothic was regarded as an American icon, the house continued to serve as a private residence, usually for rent, transferring ownership only once more from the Jones family to the Seldon Smith family at a "distress sale" in 1942. A grassroots movement to preserve the house was started as early as 1945 by Nan Wood, Grant Wood's sister and the female figure depicted in American Gothic. A visit in 1960 to the house (which was beginning to fall into disrepair) by Des Moines architect and historian William J. Wagner, A.I.A. capped these early efforts. He was among the first to suggest preservation of the house as a historic site:

The visit to your American Gothic House was very interesting and enjoyable. I will probably seem a little too enthusiastic, but I do feel you have a 'First' in Eldon. It was the painting 'American Gothic' that made Grant Wood internationally known. Phil Strong wrote that Grant Wood was the first Iowa painter to bring fame to Iowa.

I feel it would be a mistake to move the home to another location. The greatest advantage for leaving the house as is, is the vacant piece of ground across the road. This offers you a place for parking autos and a picnic area, which is a good adjunct to a historic site.

— Bill Wagner, letter to Robert Weidenbach, February 2, 1960.

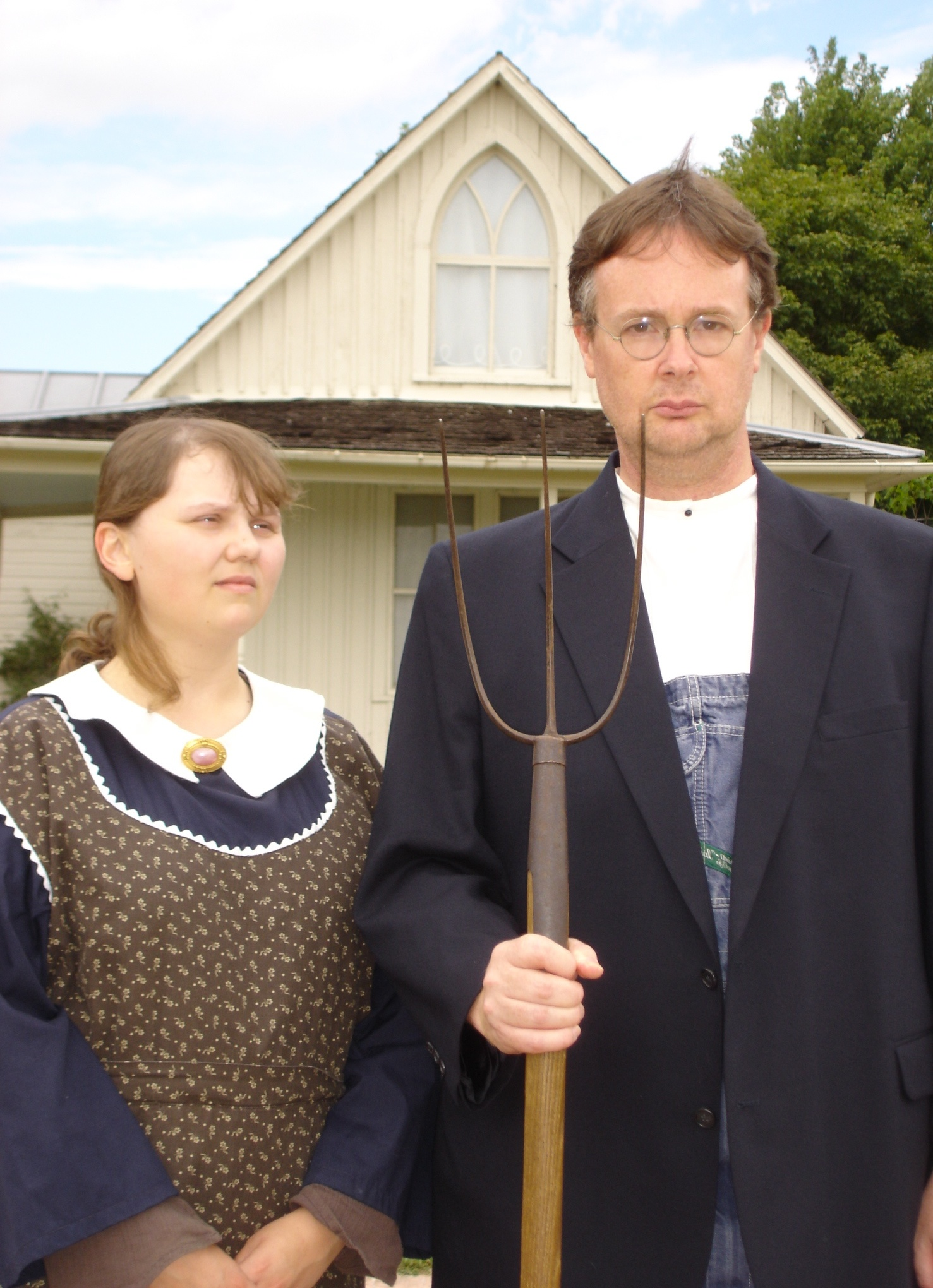
Center staff assist in dressing up visitors and taking their photograph outside the house.

In the early 1970s, a series of letters between Eldon businessmen and Carl E. Smith—who had recently inherited the house—revealed differing opinions on its continued use: Smith wanted to renovate the house and protect it from vandalism only; the Eldon leaders were more in favor of making the house an historic site. The house was abandoned for much of the 1970s—a bullet was fired in an upstairs bedroom; weather and vandalism took their toll as well. Only in the late 1980s did the owner of the property consider turning the house over to the state. Indeed, many southern Iowans were conflicted on the issue—the owner wanted to keep the house only because he believed the current renters would have nowhere else to go if they were forced to leave.

After the home was placed on the National Register of Historic Places in 1974 (the result of an application by an Eldon farmer), the owner refurbished the house, installing an indoor bathroom and electricity and restoring the windows and wallpaper. Local politicians believed such work coupled with a new museum and education center could provide a major boost to local tourism—one state senator hoped for as many as 100,000 visitors per year. After the house's owner eventually turned over the property to the State Historical Society of Iowa in 1991, an effort was made to move the house to Living History Farms outside Des Moines, but Eldonians fought to keep it within their city limits. The house was renovated in 1992, with boosters hoping to see the house become a pop-culture tourism attraction, much like the Field of Dreams site in similarly rural Dyersville. Today the American Gothic House Center hosts approximately 15,000 visitors per year, which does not account for additional after-hours visitors.

Visitors are encouraged to view the house from the outside and have their photo taken—in fact, the visitors center provides many sizes of similar aprons and jackets worn by the original painting's models. The adjacent American Gothic House Center, completed in 2007, contains exhibits about the painting, artist Grant Wood, and the community around the house. Each June, the city of Eldon holds its Gothic Days festival, a celebration of the painting and rural life in Eldon in the 1930s. Starting in 2015, tours began of the first floor of the home.
