= Nan Wood =

Nan Wood may refer to:

- Nan Wood Graham (1899–1990), sister of painter Grant Wood and model for American Gothic
- Nan Wood Honeyman (1881–1970), U.S. Representative from Oregon

== See also ==
- Nan Woods (born 1966), American actress
