= 1881 Atlanta washerwomen strike =

American labor strike

The Atlanta washerwomen strike of 1881 was a labor strike in Atlanta, Georgia involving African American washerwomen. It began on July 19, 1881, and lasted into August 1881. The strike began as an effort to establish better pay, more respect and autonomy, and a uniform base salary for their work.

== Background ==
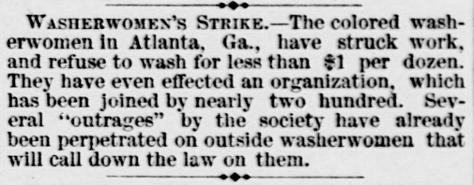
Text from the Evening Star (D.C.) on Aug 9, 1881, regarding the Atlanta strike.

In Atlanta following the Civil War, many African American women were employed as washerwomen, also known as laundresses. There were more African American women employed as washerwomen than in any other domestic work, representing over half of their total workforce. Many of those employed in this field made between $4 and $8 per month.

In July 1881, several washerwomen in the city founded the Washing Society. At the first meeting, held in a local Black church, officials were elected and a uniform rate for washerwomen was decided. While initially consisting of only 20 washerwomen, within three weeks the Washing Society boasted 3,000 members. Society members engaged in door-to-door canvassing and garnered support from several of the Black churches in the city. On July 19, the Washing Society declared a strike, demanding higher wages. Additionally, they wanted a flat rate of $1 per twelve pounds of laundry and greater work autonomy.

== Course of the strike ==
The strike began several weeks before the start of the International Cotton Exposition, a world's fair in Atlanta that was expected to bring a significant number of visitors to the city. The strikers received significant resistance from white authorities and businesspeople in the city. The Atlanta Constitution (which American historian Tera Hunter has called "the opposition's unofficial mouthpiece") was initially dismissive of the strike, though as the strike continued, they began to acknowledge the strength of the strikers. Many strikers were arrested or fined over the course of the strike action. The Atlanta City Council also threatened to impose a business tax on the washerwomen, and many of the strikers' landlords raised their tenants rates. In one such case, a striker who couldn't afford to pay one of the fines was sentenced to 40 days of working on a chain gang. Despite this, the strike continued and spurred labor disputes with other domestic workers in the city. During the strike, African American waiters at the National Hotel refused to work until their wages were increased. In early August, five hundred women strikers met at Wheat Street Baptist Church to discuss the strike. Shortly thereafter, on August 3, the strikers issued an ultimatum to mayor James W. English, saying they would pay a license fee of $25 "as a protection so we can control the washing for the city", but would continue to strike if their demands for higher wages were not met. Following this ultimatum, the city acquiesced and allowed the washerwomen greater autonomy and higher rates in exchange for a $25 license fee.

== Aftermath ==
The strike is one of several organized by domestic workers in the Southern United States during this time, being preceded by strikes in Galveston, Texas in 1877 and Jackson, Mississippi in 1866, though neither was larger than the Atlanta strike.

In analyzing the success of the strike, Hunter cited that while some washerwomen saw wage increases, many did not, and low wages would continue to be an issue between washerwomen and their employers. Additionally, Hunter cited the fact that a second strike was threatened to take place during the International Cotton Exposition, though this never came to fruition. However, others have noted that the strike, significant for involving African American women during the early Jim Crow era, was successful in demonstrating the impact of Black labor, and domestic work in particular, in the city.

== In popular culture ==
In 2022, a two-act play based on the strike appeared at the 2022 Essential Theatre Play Festival, followed by a spring 2023 workshop at Synchronicity Theatre Company co-produced by Impact Theatre Atlanta. Written by journalist and playwright Kelundra Smith, "The Wash" debuted as a full-scale production directed by Brenda Porter at Synchronicity Theatre in June 2024, with a review in The Atlanta Journal-Constitution declaring it to be "full of fun dialogue, clever staging, vibrant design and great characters".

== Bibliography ==
- Aronoff, Kate (March 9, 2017). "Strikes Aren't for the Privileged". Jacobin. Archived from the original on November 11, 2020.
- Brattain, Michelle (2001). Eskew, Glenn T. (ed.). Labor in the Modern South. University of Georgia Press. ISBN 978-0-8203-2260-5 – via Google Books.
- Hunter, Tera W. (1998). Mankiller, Wilma; Mink, Gwendolyn; Navarro, Marysa; Smith, Barbara; Steinem, Gloria (eds.). The Reader's Companion to U.S. Women's History. Houghton Mifflin Harcourt. ISBN 978-0-618-00182-8 – via Google Books.
- Hunter, Tera W. (2007). Arnesen, Eric (ed.). Encyclopedia of U.S. Labor and Working-Class History. Vol. 1. Routledge. ISBN 978-0-415-96826-3 – via Google Books.
- Kelley, Robin D. G.; Lewis, Earl, eds. (2005). To Make Our World Anew: A History of African Americans. Vol. II. Oxford University Press. ISBN 978-0-19-983901-8 – via Google Books.
- Weber, Brandon (February 6, 2018a). "'We Mean Business or No Washing': The Atlanta Washerwomen Strike of 1881". The Progressive. Archived from the original on December 14, 2020.
- Weber, Brandon (2018b). Class War, USA: Dispatches from Workers' Struggles in American History. Haymarket Books. ISBN 978-1-60846-871-3 – via Google Books.
