= Anthony Abbing =

German-American blacksmith; died on the Titanic

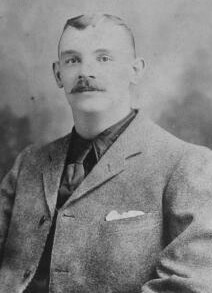
- Born: May 11, 1870; Cincinnati, Ohio, United States
- Died: April 15, 1912 (aged 41); Atlantic Ocean
- Cause of death: Drowning
- Occupation: Blacksmith
- Parents: Gerhard Heinrich Abbing (father); Catharina Ising (mother)

Anthony Abbing (May 11, 1870 – April 15, 1912) was a 3rd class German-American blacksmith who died during the sinking of the RMS Titanic.

== Life ==
Abbing was born to German immigrants Gerhard Heinrich Abbing (1835–1882) and Catharina Ising (1844–1917). Gerhard died when Anthony was 12 years old and Catharina had to work as a washerwoman until the children were old enough to support themselves. Abbing became a blacksmith and accepted contract work in South Africa in 1908.

== RMS Titanic ==
Abbing traveled to Southampton to board the RMS Titanic to return to Ohio in 1912, Abbing purchased a third class ticket, boarded the Titanic on April 10, and was killed during the sinking; his body, if recovered, was never identified. After Abbing's death, his mother and siblings filed for administration on his estate in Hamilton County, Ohio which they received in the summer of 1916.
