= Beaverboard =

Light wood-like building material

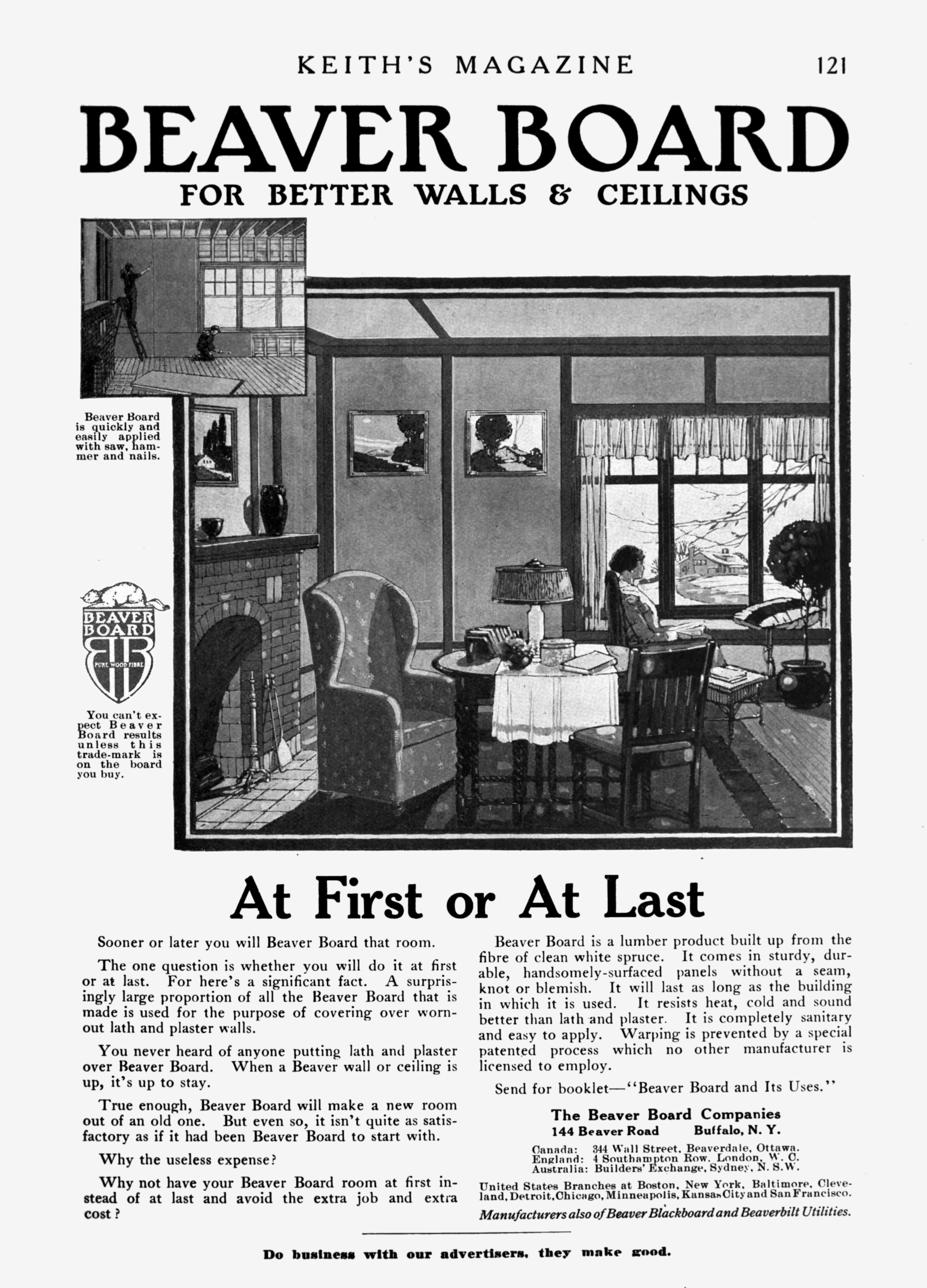
Advertisement for Beaver Board, 1917

Beaverboard (also beaver board) is a fiberboard building material formed of wood fibre compressed into sheets. It was originally a trademark for a lumber product built up from the fibre of white spruce and made from 1906 until 1928 by the Beaver Manufacturing Company at their plant in Beaver Falls and marketed from their headquarters on Beaver Road, in Buffalo, New York.

Beaverboard has occasionally been used as a canvas by artists. The painting American Gothic (1930) by Grant Wood was painted on a beaverboard panel.

== See also ==
- Paperboard
