= American Gothic (photograph) =

1942 photograph by Gordon Parks

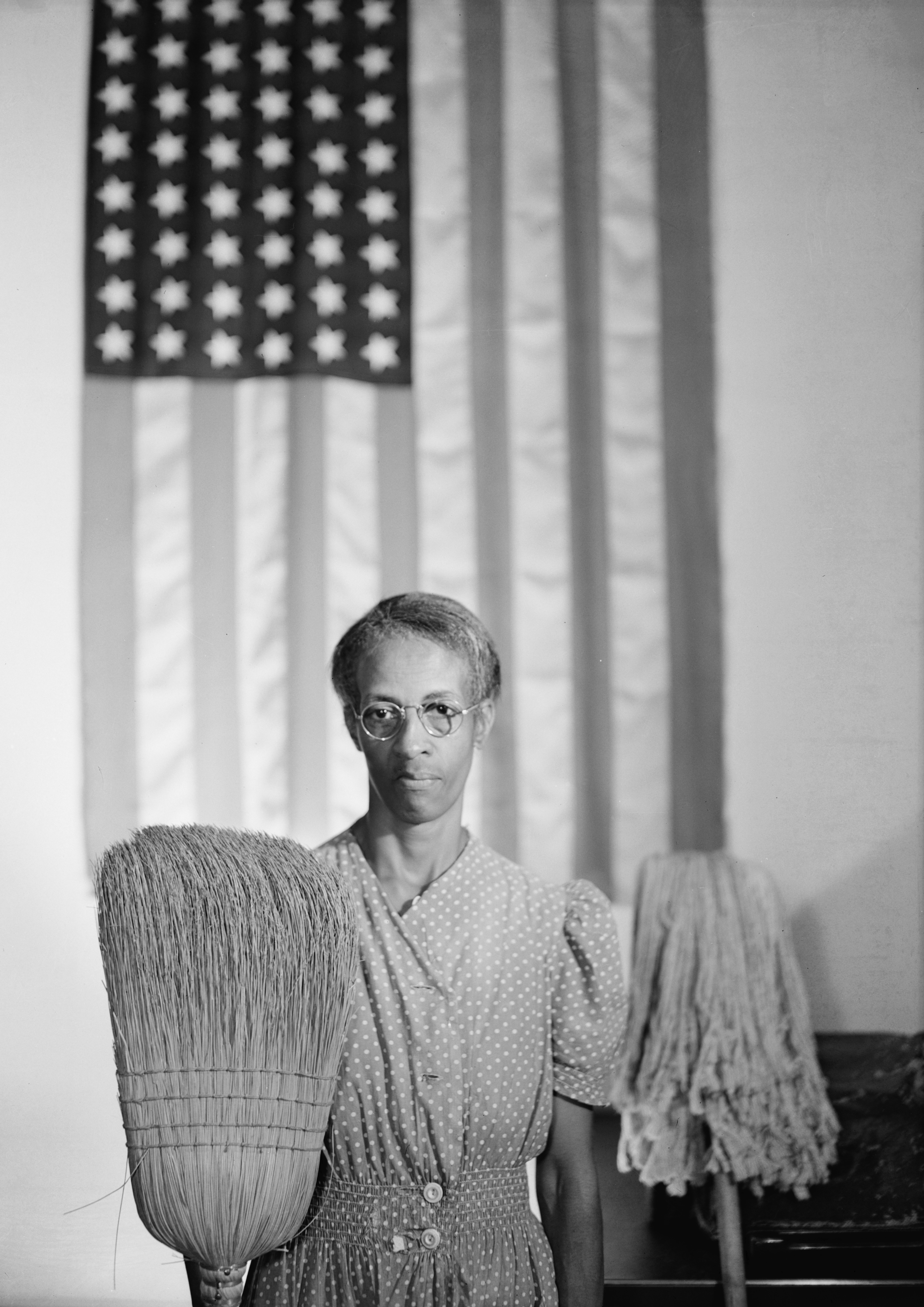
- Alt text: Black and white photo of a somber middle-aged black janitress wearing rimless glasses and a polka dot dress stares off to the side. She holds a corn broom head up and a wet mop head up in front of her. A large American Flag hangs vertically in the background, slightly out of focus.
- Artist: Gordon Parks
- Year: 1942 (84 years ago)
- Medium: Gelatin silver print
- Subject: Ella Watson
- Dimensions: 61 cm × 51 cm (24 in × 20 in)

American Gothic (also known as American Gothic, Washington, D.C.) is a photograph of Ella Watson, an American charwoman, taken by the photographer Gordon Parks in 1942. It is a reimagining of the 1930 painting of the same name by Grant Wood.

Time magazine considers American Gothic one of the "100 most influential photographs ever taken".

== Background ==
Ella Watson was born in Washington, D.C., United States, on either March 27 or March 29, 1883. She left school when she was 15, which is also when she began work as an ironer at Frazee Laundry in Washington. Until 1919, census records show that she worked intermittently as a maid and laundress, after which she was employed as a janitor by the United States Department of State, later a caretaker at a family's home, a different federal agency building, the Post Office Department, and then the Department of the Treasury in 1929, where she worked until 1944. In Parks's memoir A Hungry Heart, by the time that he met her in 1942, Watson's father had been lynched, her husband had been shot to death in 1927, and her daughter had died after bearing two illegitimate children. At the time, she was living in an apartment and was raising her adopted daughter and grandchildren as a single parent.

Gordon Parks was an American photographer who, through a fellowship from the Rosenwald Fund, arrived in Washington, D.C. in January 1942, where he gained employment at the Historical Section of the Farm Security Administration under the management of Roy Stryker. While in Washington, D.C., Parks personally witnessed rampant racial segregation and discrimination against African Americans, which inspired him to document the poverty of the black community in the area.

== Composition ==
While at the FSA, Stryker suggested to Parks that he should photograph Watson as part of his duties. Parks then spoke with Watson and, after discovering her poor living condition, Parks decided to compose a photograph of her standing in front of the flag of the United States while holding a mop and a broom. Parks would later name the photograph "American Gothic" in reference to the painting of the same name by Grant Wood.

== Gallery ==
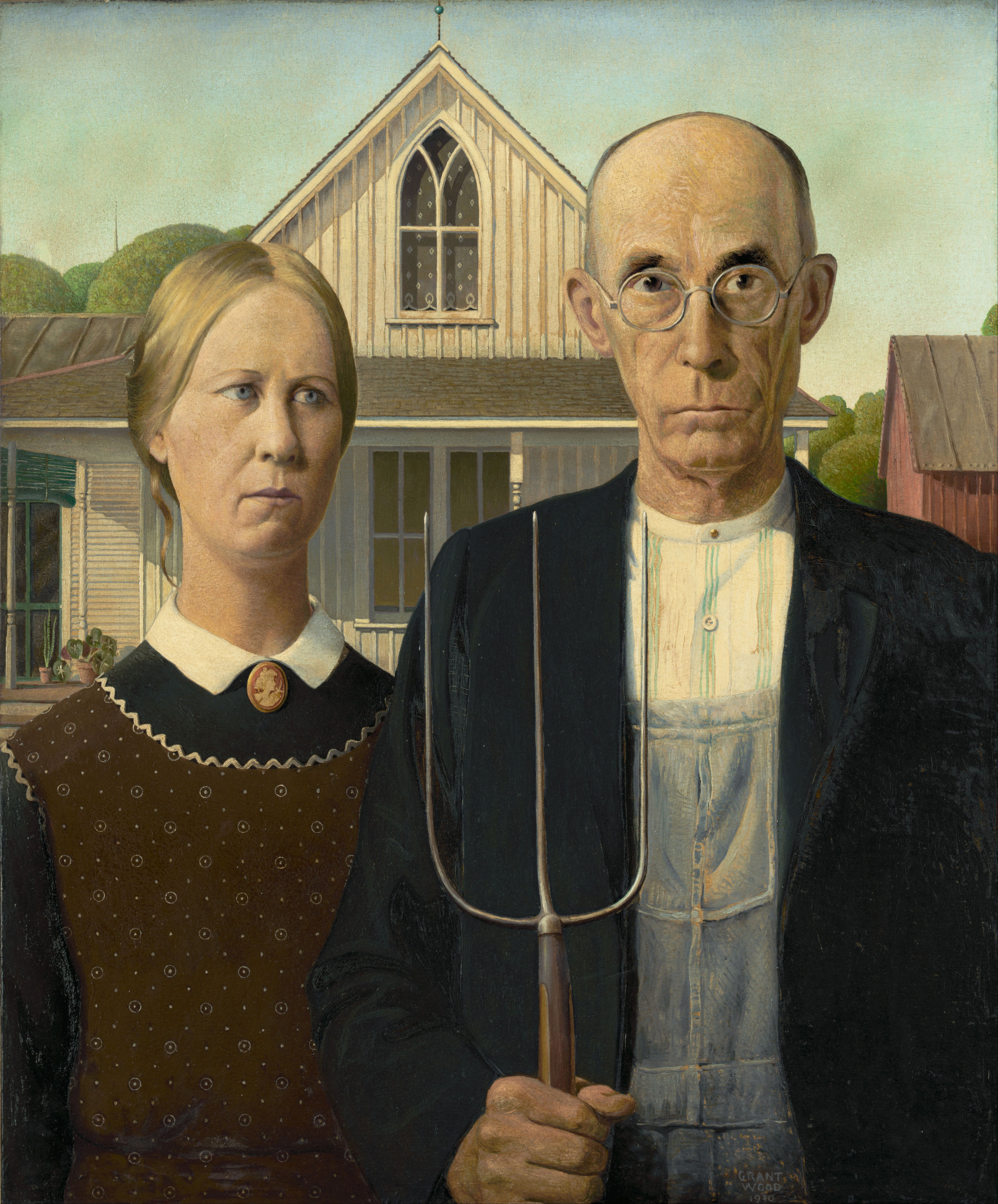
American Gothic (1930), by Grant Wood

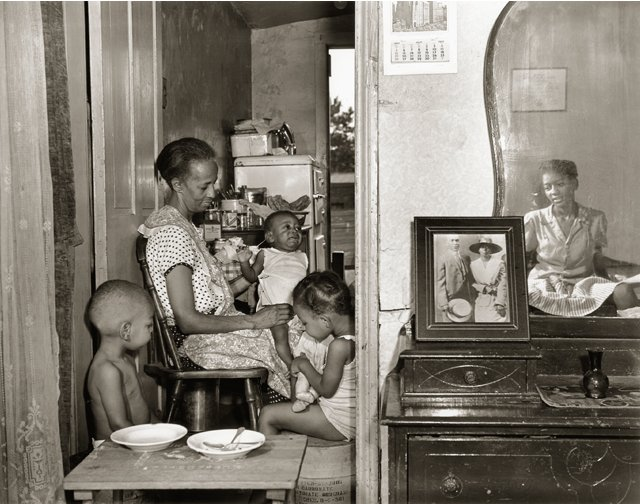
Ella Watson, with an adopted daughter and three of her grandchildren

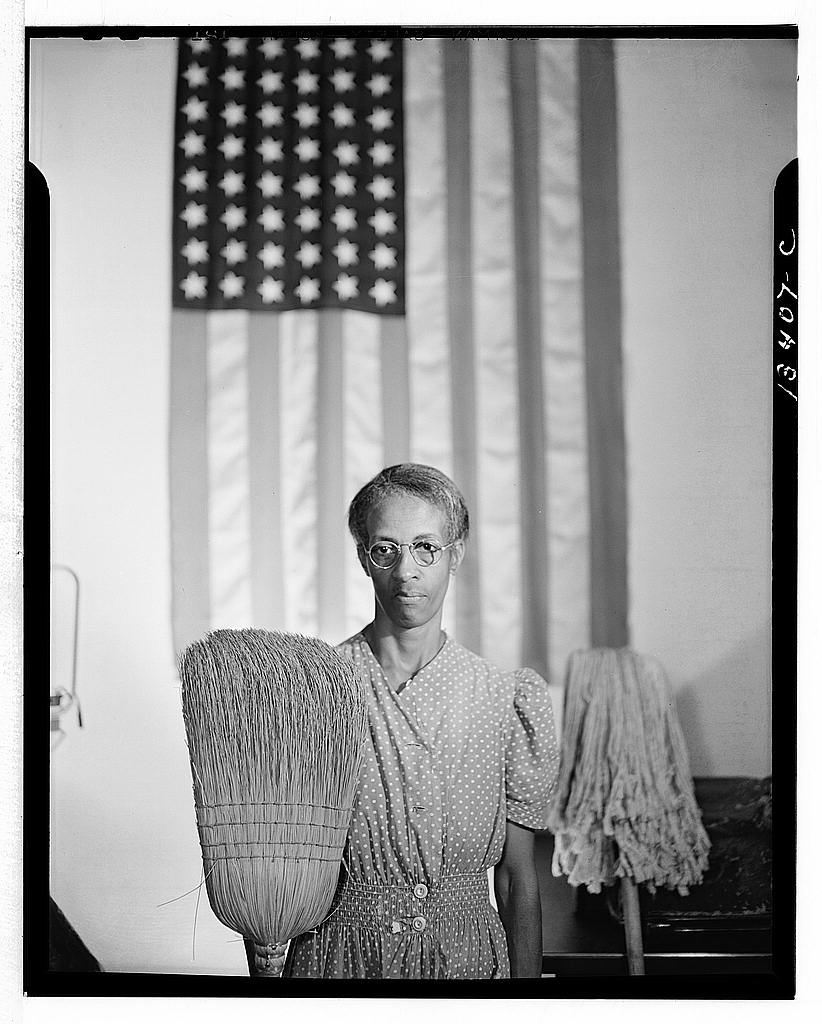
Uncropped version of the photo

== See also ==
- List of photographs considered the most important

== Bibliography ==
- McDannell, Colleen (2004-01-01). Picturing Faith: Photography and the Great Depression. Yale University Press. ISBN 978-0-300-13007-2.
