= Hammer and Hoe =

Book by Robin Kelley

Hammer and Hoe: Alabama Communists during the Great Depression
- First edition book cover
- Author: Robin D. G. Kelley
- Language: English
- Subject: Labor history of the United States, Alabama, Communism, anti-racism
- Genre: History
- Publisher: University of North Carolina Press
- Publication date: 1990
- Publication place: United States
- Website: https://uncpress.org/book/9781469625485/hammer-and-hoe/

Hammer and Hoe: Alabama Communists during the Great Depression is a 1990 book on U.S. history by Robin D. G. Kelley. It describes labor, racial and social history in Alabama during the Great Depression, focusing on black communist organizing. In particular Hammer and Hoe describes the way black workers brought existing traditions of resistance to racial oppression to their development of what the author claims to be a unique version of Marxism or Communism. The book won several prizes and was republished in a 25th anniversary edition in 2015.

== Development and publication ==
Robin D. G. Kelley developed Hammer and Hoe during graduate school in the 1980s in a climate of activism, including the protests against police violence in Liberty City, Florida, Harold Washington's election as mayor of Chicago, and the growing presidential campaign of Jesse Jackson. As a young organizer, Kelley worked to pressure the University of California system to divest from its holdings in South Africa and simultaneously became interested in radical black organizing in the US, specifically the Communist Party in Alabama, which became the topic of his dissertation and then the book.

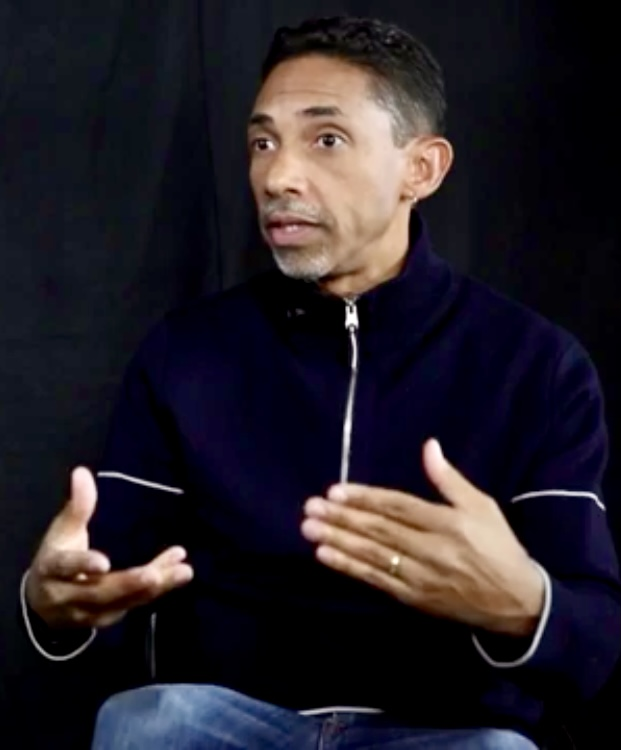
Kelley in 2014

Kelley published Hammer and Hoe with the University of North Carolina Press in 1990. A 25th anniversary edition, with a new preface, was published in 2015.

== Subject matter ==
Hammer and Hoe describes the Communist Party's role in the struggles in highly segregated Alabama, working for racial, economic, and political reforms.

Reviewing Hammer and Hoe for American Quarterly, historian David Roediger purported Kelley's methodological approach as descriptive rather than normative project: "Kelley asks not whether the Communist party was good (or correct or independent) but how the party came to attract a substantial number of African-American workers in Alabama and to energize their struggles [emphasis in the original]. Or, more exactly he asks how these black workers could embrace and use the Communist party as a vehicle for organizing themselves. He insists on measuring radicalism not by its ideological purity but by its ability to interact with a received culture to generate bold class organizations." Writing at The Nation, Sarah Jaffe says, "Kelley details [...] how black workers in Alabama made communism their own, blending the teachings of Marx and Lenin with those of the black church and the lessons of decades of resistance to slavery, segregation, and racist terrorism."

== Reception ==
Roediger praised Hammer and Hoe as "superbly crafted...a story that is fresh in every way."

For Hammer and Hoe, Kelley won the Elliott Rudwick Prize from the Organization of American Historians, the Outstanding Book Award from the Gustavus Myers Center for the Study of Bigotry and Human Rights in North America, and the Francis Butler Simkins Award from the Southern Historical Association.

In 2015, Jaffe wrote that the book on "what might have seemed to be a fairly esoteric topic yet offered lessons that activists have been drawing on for twenty-five years. Throughout that time, the book has remained in print, winning awards and, more important to Kelley, a place in the hearts and strategic thinking of decades of young organizers struggling with the questions of race, gender, class, and solidarity."
