= Charwoman =

Domestic worker who usually cleans houses during short visits

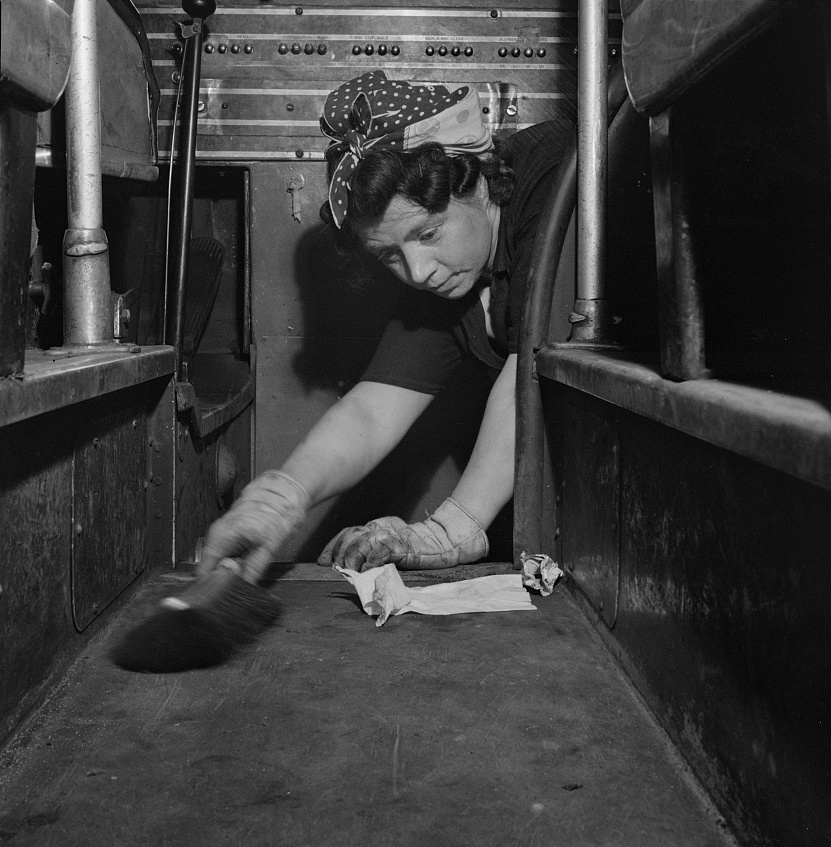
A 1943 photograph of a charwoman in Pittsburgh, Pennsylvania, United States

Charwoman, chargirl, charlady and char are occupational terms referring to a paid part-time worker who comes into a house or other building to clean it for a few hours of a day or week, as opposed to a maid, who usually lives as part of the household within the structure of domestic service. A charwoman might work independently, often for cash in hand, or might come through an employment agency.

Before 1960, the term "charwoman" was used as an official job title by government agencies in the United States, including municipal and state governments and by federal agencies such as the Department of Commerce and Labor, the Bureau of the Census, and the Bureau of Immigration.

== Charwoman in Britain ==
A char or chare was a term (of work) in the 16th century, which gave rise to the word being used as a prefix to denote people working in domestic service. The usage of "charwoman" was common in the mid-19th century, often appearing as an occupation in the UK census of 1841. It fell out of common use in the later decades of the 20th century, often replaced by the term "daily (woman)". Unlike a maid or housekeeper (typically live-in positions), the charwoman usually worked for hourly wages, usually on a part-time contract, often having several different employers.

Charwoman were often treated as a part of a miscellaneous labor category as opposed to being defined as a specific and honored profession. This is evident when the 1909 Pageant of Woman's Trades and Professions was divided into five categories where charwomen were forced into a 5th category with other workers such as gardeners, farmers, and waitresses. The Domestic Worker Union (DWU) emerged in 1934 with the goal of elevating the work of charwoman and maids to the status of a legitimate and skilled laboring trade. Others also believed that domestic work should be revalued, modernized, and relieved of the negative stigma. Catherine Webb from the Woman's Industrial Council was convinced that domestic household work would eventually transform from low-status work into a respected profession like nursing by requiring formal trainings and qualifications. Others, however, believed such work should be abolished.

Throughout the emergence of domestic work in 19th century Britain, there never entirely seemed to be clear boundaries between "charwoman", "daily help", and "cleaners". All of the professions mentioned were classified by society as practically same thing since they were all paid hourly wage and typically were called to houses to execute the dirty work and physically demanding tasks.

Charwomen have also sometimes been referred to as "scrubwomen". The word has the same root as "chore woman", one hired to do odd chores around the house. In British English, "cleaner" is now used much more often. In American English, the term "cleaning lady" or "housekeeper" is often used for any woman who cleans a home or hotel, whether she lives there or not. American Gothic is an iconic photograph of "charwoman" Ella Watson by Gordon Parks, as a reimaging of the painting of the same name.

== Stigma and Abuse ==
Charwomen were often associated with "dirt", "filthiness", and "low status" which left them to vulnerable to domestic and sexual abuse. Former charlady Mrs. Betty Miller highlights a scenario where her employer made repeated sexual comments because "he thought that because I was the cleaner he could say anything he liked".

== In fiction ==
The position has often featured as a stock character in fiction.

=== Literature ===
In British literature, Victorian examples includes Mrs. Dilber, Ebenezer Scrooge's charwoman, who appears in Charles Dickens's A Christmas Carol. In the short story "The Diary of Anne Rodway", by Wilkie Collins, Anne investigates the murder of her friend Mary and learns that the suspect's wife is a woman "ready to turn her hand to anything: charing, washing, laying-out, keeping empty houses..." A charwoman appears in Franz Kafka's The Metamorphosis (1915).

In 1926, Lord Dunsany's fantasy novel The Charwoman's Shadow was published to good reviews. A woman granted eternal life, but not eternal youth, finds herself working forever as a magician's charwoman.

A charwoman, Sarah Cobbin, is a critical character in the detective novel Part for a Poisoner (1948) by E.C.R. Lorac. In the comic strip Andy Capp (from 1957), Andy's wife Flo is a charwoman. Another well-known fictional charwoman is Ada Harris, the central character in Paul Gallico's novel Mrs 'Arris goes to Paris (1958) and its three sequels.

=== Acting ===
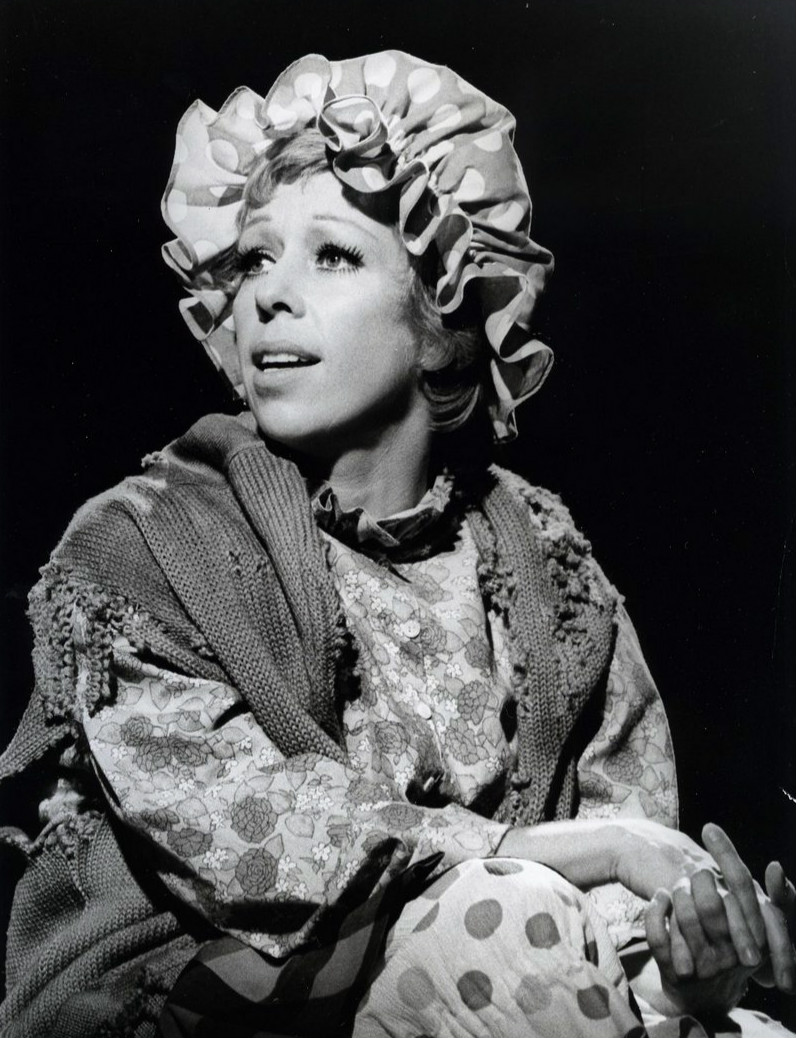
Carol Burnett's charwoman character, 1974

Charwomen have often appeared on stage, radio, film, and television. The music hall comedian Arthur Lucan portrayed throughout his career a feisty Irish charwoman named Mrs. Riley opposite his wife Kitty McShane, who depicted Mrs Riley's daughter. The public's enthusiasm for these stage characters prompted the couple to make the pair a part of their repertoire and this led to sixteen Old Mother Riley films, from 1937 to 1952. In the radio comedy series It's That Man Again (1939–1949), Dorothy Summers played the part of Mrs Mopp, an office char whose catchphrase was "Can I do you now, Sir?" (i.e., "May I clean your office now, Sir?" but with an obvious double entendre). Coronation Street character Hilda Ogden (Jean Alexander) achieved mass popularity in the United Kingdom, and has become synonymous with charwoman due to her several jobs cleaning for businesses and neighbours in the show's local area, Weatherfield.

In 1963, Peggy Mount starred in Ladies Who Do, in which a group of charwomen go into high finance under the guidance of the eccentric Colonel Whitforth (Robert Morley), in order to save their old neighbourhood from a team of ruthless developers led by Harry H. Corbett. In 1966–67, Kathleen Harrison starred as a charwoman who inherits £10 million from her employer, on the television series Mrs. Thursday. Mabel (played by Barbara New) was the lowly charwoman and a main character in the 1990s British sitcom You Rang, M'Lord?, which was set in the 1920s.

American comedian Carol Burnett made a charwoman character into a signature routine during her television career with Garry Moore and later on her own popular long-running variety show.

== See also ==
- Washerwoman, a laundress
