= Race Rebels =

1994 book by Robin Kelley

Race Rebels: Culture, Politics, and the Black Working Class
- Author: Robin D. G. Kelley
- Genre: Non-fiction
- Publisher: Free Press
- Publication date: 1994
- Pages: 357
- ISBN: 0-684-82639-9
- OCLC: 34151035
- Dewey Decimal: 973/.0496073 20
- LC Class: E185.61 .K356 1996

Race Rebels: Culture, Politics, and the Black Working Class is a 1994 non-fiction book by American writer Robin D. G. Kelley. The book, a cohesive adaptation of several articles previously published by Kelley, concerns the impact made by black members of the American working class on American politics and culture. Kelley's work does not focus solely on race, but considers the compound impact of race, class and gender. 2007's Blue-chip Black: Race, Class and Status in the New Black Middle Class draws from Kelley's text as an example of this focus the influence exercised by working-class black bus riders in Birmingham, Alabama, on segregation during World War II, an analysis described in 2003's Multiculturalism, Postcoloniality, and Transnational Media as "fascinating". Inspired by a concept put forward by political anthropologist James C. Scott, Kelley utilizes the concept of "infrapolitics" in exploring the political impact of confrontation between black Americans and white Americans, examining what Scott described as "the circumspect struggle waged daily by subordinate groups [which] is, like infrared rays, beyond the visible end of the spectrum."

== Summary ==
Kelley examines the methods of resistance adopted by black working class as well as the spaces where black working class congregated to form an emerging consciousness. Utilizing the theory of historian George Rawick that the only way to detect working-class resistance from the past is to have knowledge of the amount of damage caused to the employer by the employees, Kelley documents the organized and unorganized ways black workers expressed resentment for racist treatment, including slowdowns, theft, leaving work early, quitting, and various acts of sabotage. He also looks in depth at black resistance that took place in public space, namely Birmingham’s streetcars and buses during World War II. In spite of strict controls by mostly white American bus operators, black working-class riders had no other transportation options and offered fierce resistance—not just in publicly celebrated incidents of heroism of individuals such as Rosa Parks and Ida B. Wells-Barnett, but in every-day conflicts such as arguments and fights with authorities and other riders. According to Kelley, such incidents not only inspired the individuals involved but also galvanized onlookers to the effect that the governance of public transit became quite difficult, which slowly effected change.

Incorporating the theories of Richard Wright and Zora Neale Hurston, Kelley examines the social spaces utilized by black working class to escape the racism and humiliations they suffered at the hands of the authority, such as church and home. These spaces, though sometimes also disrupted by outsiders, allowed the community "dark" and hidden venues to discuss experiences, grievances, and dreams that helped to shape black working-class consciousness.

Kelley spends part of the book investigating the embracing of alternative goals and lifestyles as a means of resisting poor and limited choices. Young black men during the World War II era were largely burdened by poor or low levels if formal education and training that it made it difficult for them to find, much less maintain, employment. Rather than adopting the stereotype assigned poor, southern migrants, many working-class blacks embraced a new identity symbolized by the zoot suit. According to Kelley, many of the working-class blacks of the era felt that most of the jobs available to them were "slave labor", and they instead elected to become hustlers, pimps and gangsters in the face of job discrimination and the lack of viable employment options. New identities afforded new opportunities to individuals such as Malcolm Little to study the psychology of white racism, though the choice of criminal life also brought extreme consequences.

In more recent times, this alternate choice is demonstrated through "gangsta rap", which evolved out of the authority-challenging blues of the 19th century. Born from black working class in Los Angeles, the musical genre responds in part to the hard realities of poverty and declining unemployment. Kelley illustrates these facets by referencing the lyrics of Ice Cube, who in "A Bird in the Hand"—a track on 1991's Death Certificate—tells the story of a young man forced to sell crack to survive when the only job he can obtain after graduation is an underpaying one at McDonald's.

== Reviews ==
- Buhle, Paul (February 1996). Monthly Review. 47 (9).
- Review, Michael Hoerger
- Review, Tolbert, Emory J.
