= Washerwoman =

Woman who washes clothes for others

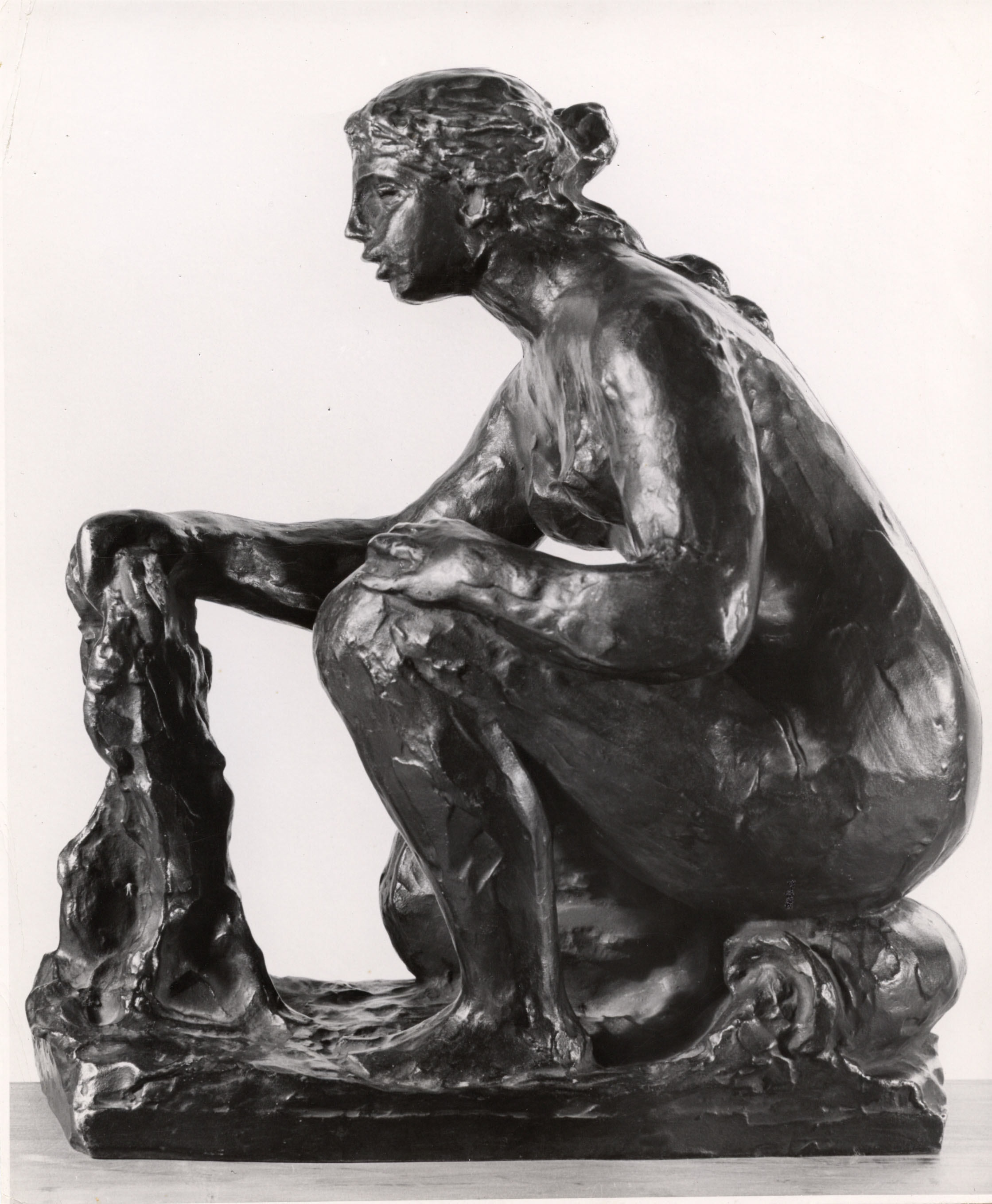
Bronze sculpture by Renoir, 1916

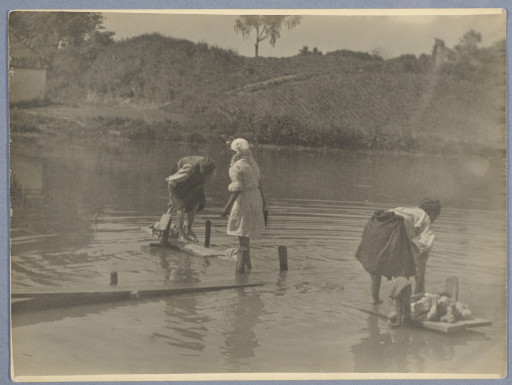
Washerwomen by the river, 20th century Poland

A washerwoman or laundress was a person, usually a woman, employed to wash laundry by hand, before the widespread use of washing machines and commercial laundries. The profession existed in many cultures, spanning from antiquity to the early modern period. While the profession has historically been gendered, often associated with women, in some contexts, men (laundrymen) also performed laundry labor. It was typically low-paid, physically arduous, and associated with lower social status. Their work has been documented through art, literature, and labor records.

== Work and conditions ==
Before the widespread use of mechanized laundries and domestic washing machines, laundry was cleaned by hand. Clothes were washed in rivers, streams, or communal washhouses (Lavoirs) where they could be scrubbed against stones or boards, beaten with paddles, and then rinsed in running water. Once the clothes were clean, the garments were wrung out and left to dry on grass, bushes, or lines.

In towns, washhouses provided flowing water and partial shelter, but they also served as social spaces where women could talk and work together while washing clothes. The work was labor-intensive, with large tubs or cauldrons used to boil the linens and heavy iron or wooden tools to agitate or press them.

== History ==
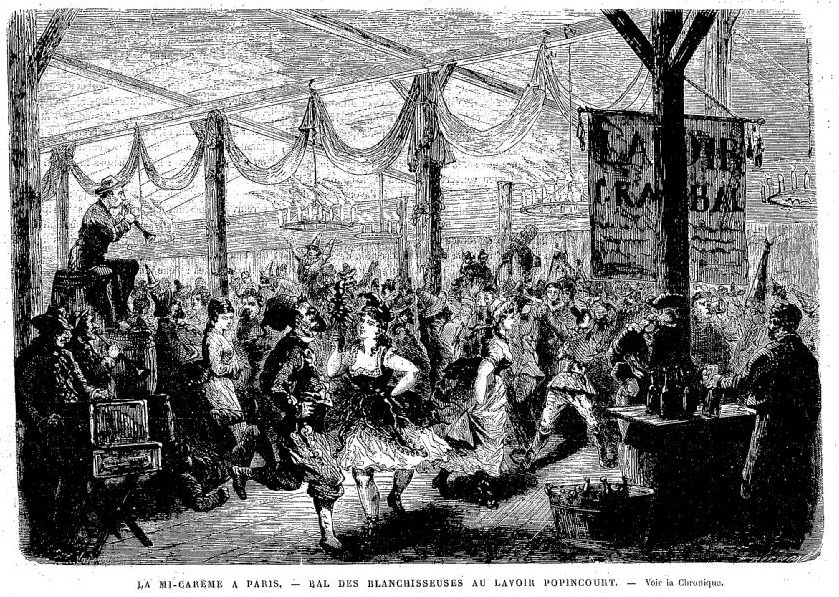
The annual dance of the washerwomen in one district of Paris, 1872

=== Ancient and Medieval World ===
Laundry work has been documented since antiquity. As evidenced in Homer's Odyssey, the character Nausicaa and her handmaidens are depicted washing clothing, suggesting that this task can be performed even by high-status women in Ancient Greece.

=== Early Modern Period ===
From the sixteenth to eighteenth centuries, laundresses were employed in urban and domestic service contexts. Large households, including royal courts, often appointed laundresses to care for linens and clothing. In some cases, the position could be a stable appointment within a noble household. The wet nurse to George III of the United Kingdom, who was born two months prematurely, was so valued by the king when he grew up that her daughter was appointed laundress to the Royal Household, "a sinecure place of great emolument".

Laundering was also assigned to marginalized women in institutions such as the Magdalene asylums, where laundering was considered a suitable occupation for the fallen women they accommodated.

=== Nineteenth Century ===
==== Europe ====
By the nineteenth century, washerwomen were highly visible in European cities. Various subdivisions of laundry workers in 19th-century France (blanchisseuse, lavandière, laveuse, buandière, repasseuse, etc.) were respected for their trade. A festival in their honor was held at the end of winter (Mi-Careme, halfway through Lent, i.e., three weeks after Mardi Gras or Shrove Tuesday). This festival has now been revived as Mi-Carême au Carnaval de Paris.

In Britain, privately owned laundries sometimes clashed with public washhouses. The National Laundry Trade Protection Association, representing private laundry owners in London, argued that public washhouses were being used by professional washerwomen to clean clients’ clothing, and campaigned to restrict this practice between 1899 and 1902.

==== U.S. ====
===== African American Women =====
In the United States, laundry was one of the most common occupations for African American women in the nineteenth century. Enslaved women were often assigned to washing linens and clothing. After emancipation, many freedwomen supported themselves and their families as washerwomen. Historian Tera Hunter has researched Black Washerwomen in Atlanta, who organized networks of mutual support. In 1881, thousands of washerwomen staged a labor strike to set their own wages and resist labor exploitation. (see 1881 Atlanta washerwomen strike) Hunter states in her research that laundry work provided income and autonomy within the African American community.

===== Chinese laundrymen =====
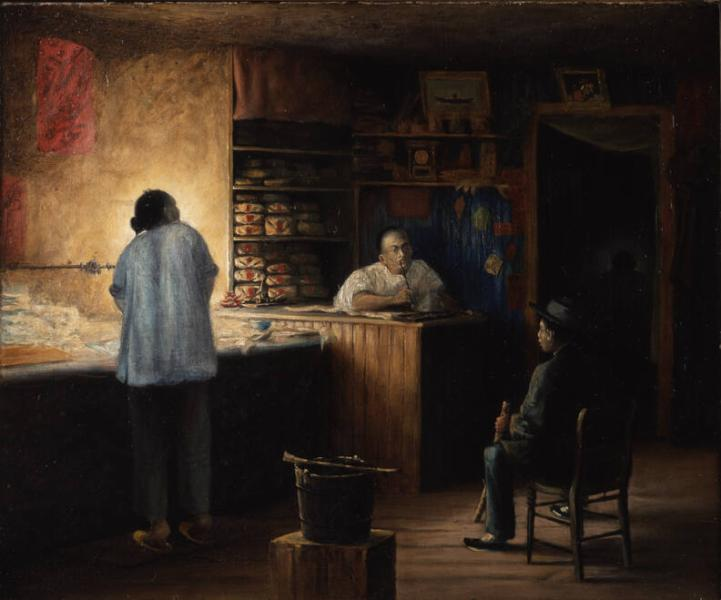
Painting of a Chinese laundry by Stafford Mantle Northcote

During the Gold Rush period, some Chinese immigrant men in the nineteenth century entered the laundry trade as exclusionary laws restricted them from other forms of employment. By the mid-1800s, Chinese laundries were spread throughout major cities such as San Francisco. On the corner of Washington and Grant Streets, an enterprising Chinese immigrant named Wong Lee opened California's first large hand laundry, charging $5 a dozen to wash shirts.

=== Decline ===
The occupation began to decline with the rise of commercial laundries. The spread of domestic washing machines and self-service laundries further reduced the need for the independent washerwomen profession. By the late twentieth century, the profession had largely disappeared in industrialized countries.

== In culture ==
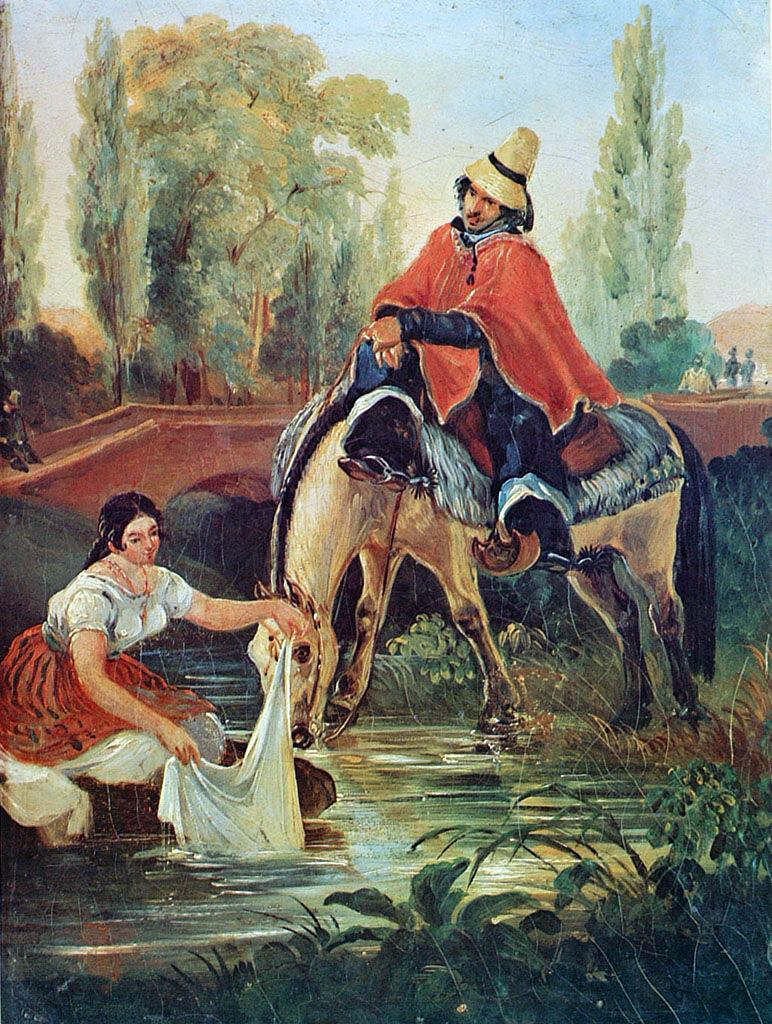
The Huaso and the Washerwoman by Mauricio Rugendas (1835)

Washerwomen and laundresses have been popular subjects in art, literature, and music.

The profession has been portrayed in various forms of French art. French impressionist Degas depicted laundresses in over 30 pieces of his artwork. French artist Honoré Daumier also depicted the occupation in his oil on oak piece "The Laundress, c.1863."

In literature, the washerwoman may be a convenient disguise, as with Toad, one of the protagonists of The Wind in the Willows (1908), in order to escape from prison; and in The Penultimate Peril story of the Lemony Snicket book series A Series of Unfortunate Events, Kevin the Ambidextrous Man poses as a washerwoman who works in the laundry room at the Hotel Denouement.

Also, washerwomen serve as characters depicting the working poor, as for example in A Christmas Carol: when the Ghost of Christmas Yet to Come showed Ebenezer Scrooge his future where he is dead, the laundress assists the charwoman Mrs. Dilber and the unnamed undertaker into stealing some of Scrooge's belongings and selling them to a fence named Old Joe.

In music, one of the most famous Irish jigs is known as The Irish Washerwoman, although due to its age the origin of this title is not well known.

== See also ==
- Dhobi, the washermen of India
- Baths and wash houses in Britain
- Blanchisseuse, a village named after its washerwomen
- Les Lavandières, a group of three old women in Celtic folklore
- Charwoman, a similar occupation, involving cleaning houses and offices
