= Ella Watson =

American charwoman and photograph subject (1883–1980)

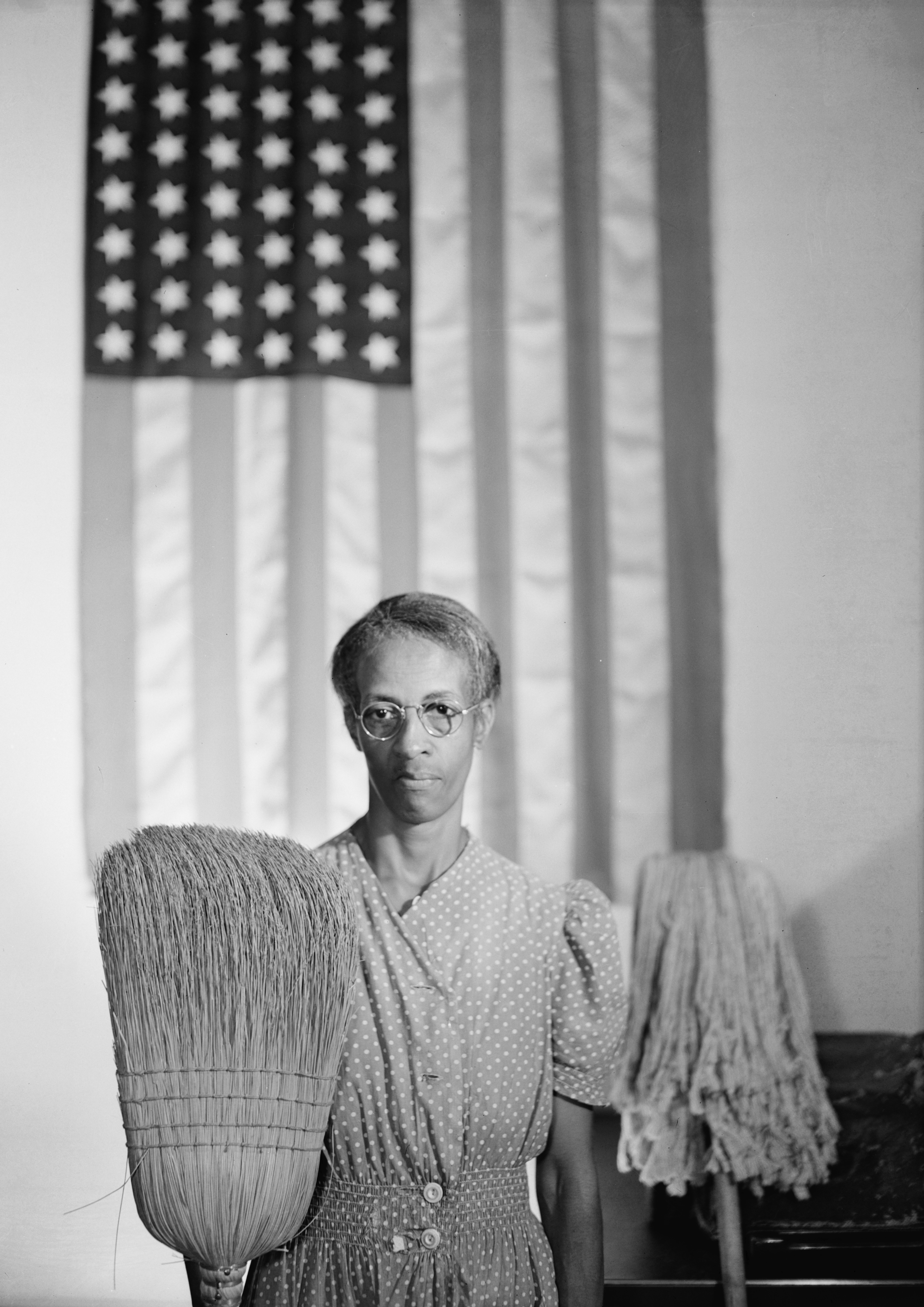
- Ella Watson in American Gothic, 1942
- Born: 27/29 March, 1883; Washington, D.C., US
- Died: April 3, 1980 (aged 97); Prince George's County, US
- Occupation: Charwoman
- Known for: Subject of American Gothic by Gordon Parks

Ella Watson (March 27/29, 1883 – April 3, 1980) was an American janitor and charwoman who was famously the subject of Gordon Parks' photographic series including American Gothic in 1942, among at least 90 other photographs. According to the Gordon Parks Foundation, "Parks asked if he could take Watson's picture. She agreed, and for four months gave him access to her home and her community. The resulting photographs were a breakthrough in Parks' career." In 2024, the Minneapolis Institute of Art exhibited 60 of the photographs.

== Early life and career ==
Ella Watson was born in Washington D.C., United States on either March 27 or March 29, 1883. She left school when she was 15, which is also when she began work as an ironer at Frazee Laundry in Washington. Until 1919, census records show she worked intermittently as a maid and laundress, after which she was employed as a janitor by the United States Department of State, later a caretaker at a family's home, a different federal agency building, the Post Office Department, and then the Department of the Treasury in 1929, where she worked until 1944. In Parks' memoir A Hungry Heart, by the time he met her in 1942, Watson's father was lynched, her husband shot dead in 1927, her daughter died after bearing two illegitimate children. At the time, she was living in an apartment and was raising her adopted daughter and grandchildren as a single parent.

== American Gothic ==
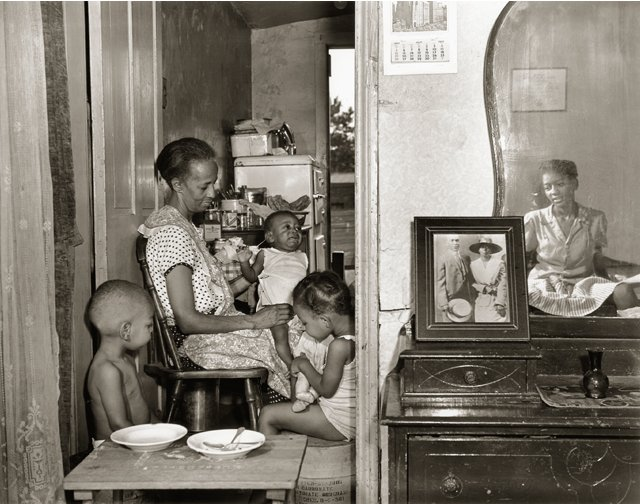
Watson with her three grandchildren and her adopted daughter, photographed by Parks during the same summer of American Gothic.

Gordon Parks was an American photographer who, through a fellowship from the Rosenwald Fund, arrived in Washington D.C. in January 1942, where he gained employment at the Historical Section of the Farm Security Administration.

== Legacy ==
Historian Deborah Willies interviewed her grandchildren in 2018. The book American Gothic; Gordon Parks and Ella Watson published in 2024 explores the series of photographs and the historic collaboration between photographer and subject. The Library of Congress has a collection of the images. Watson is identified as a charwoman in the photos.

== Bibliography ==
- McDannell, Colleen (January 1, 2004). Picturing Faith: Photography and the Great Depression. Yale University Press. ISBN 978-0-300-13007-2.
