= The Tattooed Countess =

1924 novel by Carl Van Vechten

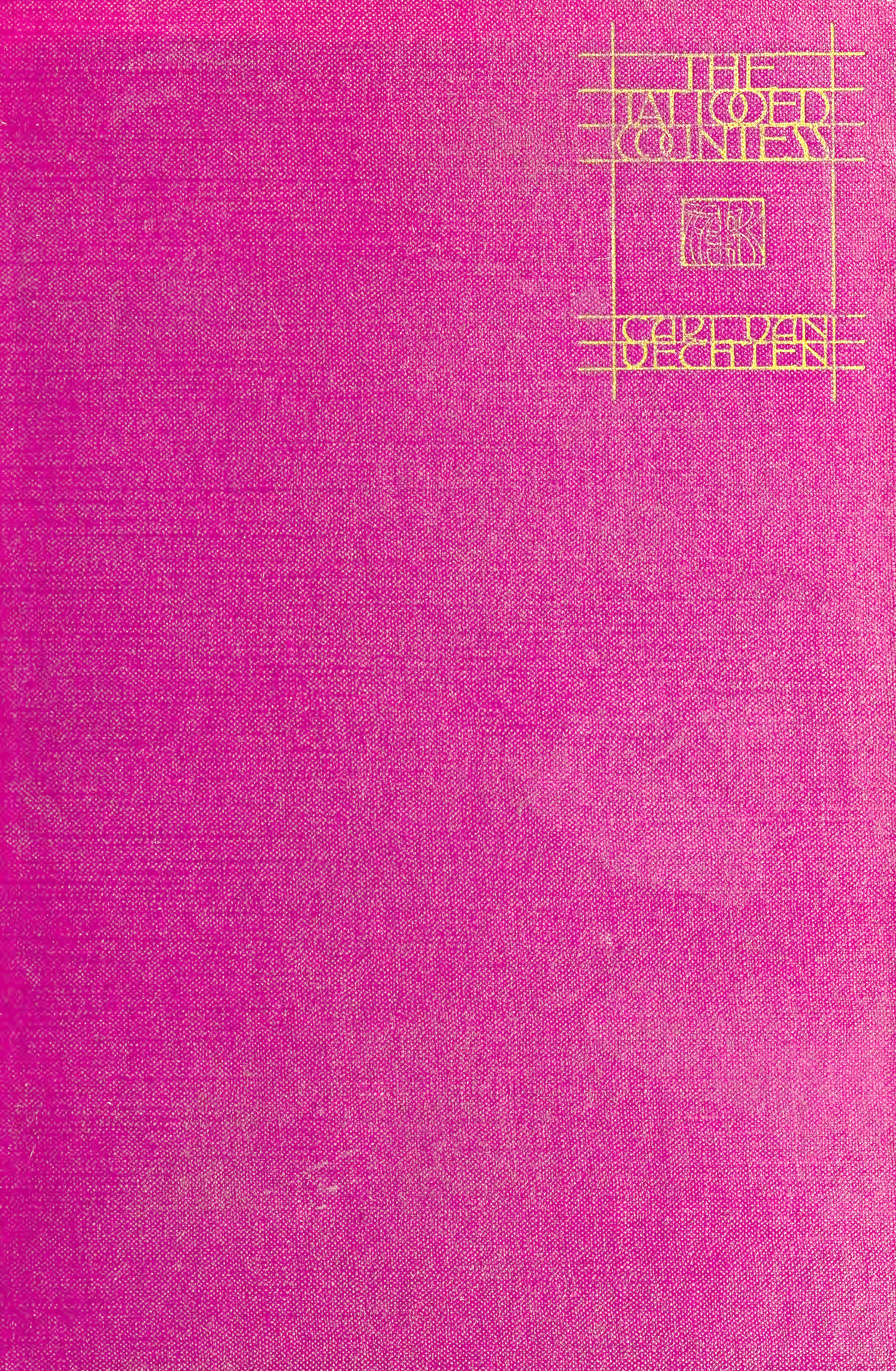
The original front cover to The Tattooed Countess

The Tattooed Countess – A romantic novel with a happy ending is a 1924 novel by Carl Van Vechten. The novel exists in the same fictional universe as Van Vechten's previous novel, The Blind Bow-boy (1923), as well as Firecrackers (1925) and Nigger Heaven (1926).

== Plot ==
On Thursday, June 17, 1897, in the women's toilet-room at one end of a parlour-car on the Overland Limited, speeding westward from Chicago, a lady sat smoking a cigarette. It was a sultry day and she did not appear to be very comfortable; obviously no one but a confirmed smoker would have resorted to this only means, in the circumstances, of evading the custom of the country.
The Countess Ella Nattatorrini was a well-preserved, fashionably dressed woman of fifty. Little lines were beginning to gather around her grey eyes. Her golden-red hair, parted and waved, quite evidently owed its hue to the art of the hairdresser. Her slightly sagging chin was supported by the stiff bones in her high lace collar. She was at that dangerous and fascinating age just before decay sets in.

— Carl Van Vechten, The first sentences of The Tattooed Countess

== See also ==
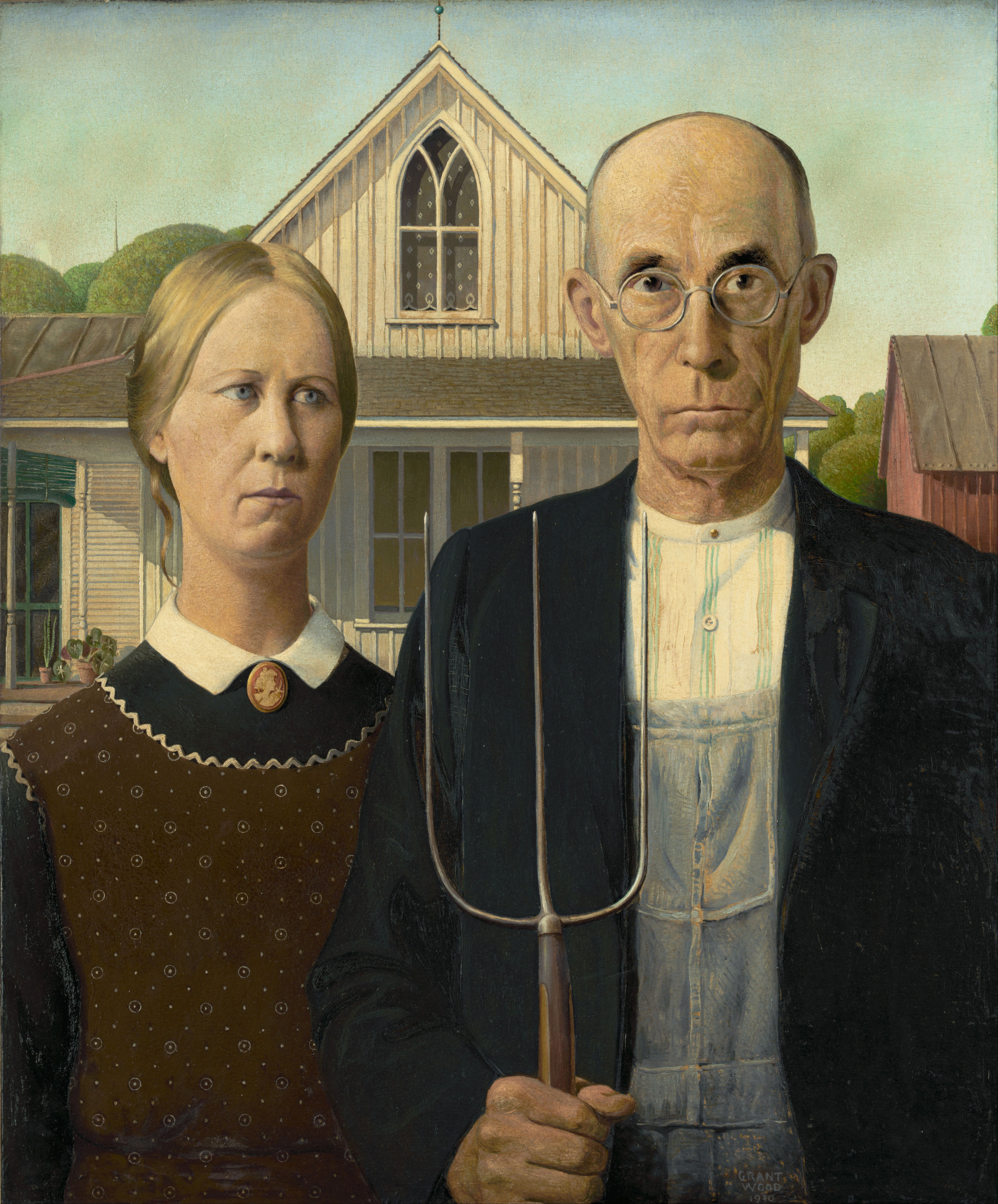
The 1930 painting American Gothic was seen as part of the same trend toward increasingly critical depictions of rural America as the novel The Tattooed Countess.

- American Gothic – A 1930 painting by Grant Wood seen as part of the same trend toward increasingly critical depictions of rural America
