= Robin D. G. Kelley =

American historian and academic (born 1962)

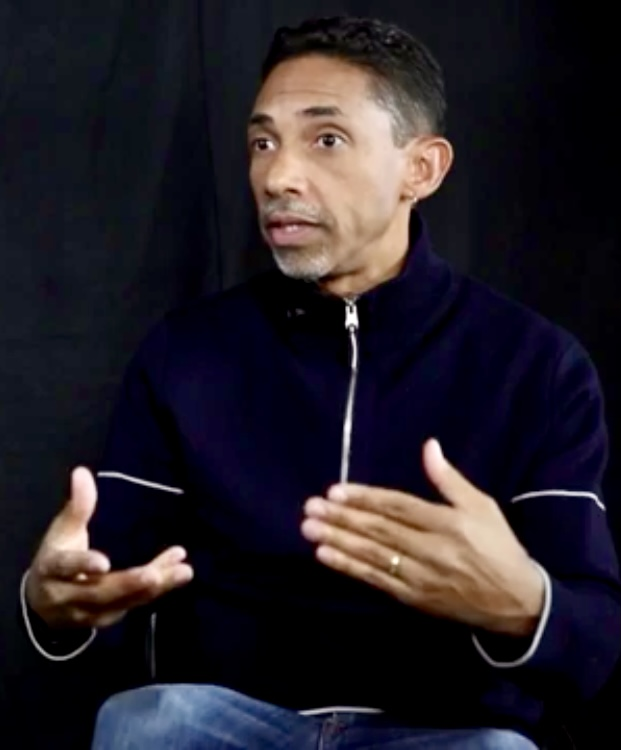
- Kelley in a 2014 interview
- Born: Robin Davis Gibran Kelley; March 14, 1962 (age 64); New York City, US
- Education: California State University, Long Beach (BA); University of California, Los Angeles (MA, PhD)
- Occupations: Historian and academic
- Employer: UCLA
- Writing career
- Genre: History
- Notable work: Race Rebels: Culture, Politics, and the Black Working Class (1994)

Robin Davis Gibran Kelley (born March 14, 1962) is an American historian and academic, who is the Gary B. Nash Professor of American History at the University of California, Los Angeles (UCLA).

From 2006 to 2011, he was Professor of American Studies and Ethnicity at the University of Southern California (USC), and from 2003 to 2006 he was the William B. Ransford Professor of Cultural and Historical Studies at Columbia University. From 1994 to 2003, he was a professor of history and Africana Studies at New York University (NYU) as well the chair of NYU's history department from 2002 to 2003. Kelley has also served as a Hess Scholar-in-Residence at Brooklyn College. In the summer of 2000, he was honored as a Montgomery Fellow at Dartmouth College, where he taught and mentored a class of sophomores, as well as wrote the majority of the book Freedom Dreams.

During the academic year 2009–10, Kelley served as Harold Vyvyan Harmsworth Professor of American History at Oxford University, the first African-American historian to do so since the chair was established in 1922. He was awarded the Guggenheim Fellowship in 2014. He is also the author of a 2009 biography of Thelonious Monk.

Kelley has described himself as a Marxist Surrealist feminist.

== Biography ==
=== Early years and education ===
Born in New York City, Kelley earned his bachelor's degree from California State University, Long Beach, in 1983. By 1987 he had earned a master's in African history and doctorate in U.S. history from UCLA.

=== Career ===
After earning his doctorate, he began his career as an assistant professor at Southeastern Massachusetts University, then to Emory University, and the University of Michigan, where he was promoted to associate professor with tenure. He later moved to the Department of History at New York University (NYU), where he was promoted to the rank of professor and taught courses on U.S. history, African-American history, and popular culture. At the age of 32, he was the youngest full professor at NYU. He is a Distinguished Fellow of the Rothermere American Institute at the University of Oxford.

Kelley has spent most of his career exploring American and African-American history, with a particular emphasis on radical social movements and the political dynamics at work within African-American culture, including jazz, hip-hop, and visual arts.

Although influenced by Marxism, Kelley has eschewed a doctrinaire Marxist approach to aesthetics and culture, preferring a modified surrealist approach. He has described himself in the past as a "Marxist surrealist feminist who is not just anti something but pro-emancipation, pro-liberation."

Kelley has also used the concept of racial capitalism in his work.

== Writing and publications ==
Kelley has written several books focusing on African-American history and culture as well as race relations, including Race Rebels: Culture, Politics, and the Black Working Class (1994), Yo' Mama's DisFunktional!: Fighting the Culture Wars in Urban America (1997), and Freedom Dreams: The Black Radical Imagination (2002). He is also a prolific essayist, having published dozens of articles in scholarly journals, anthologies, and in the popular press, including the Village Voice, Boston Review, and The New York Times.

His book Thelonious Monk: The Life and Times of an American Original (Free Press, 2009), received several honors, including Best Book on Jazz from the Jazz Journalists Association and the Ambassador Award for Book of Special Distinction from the English-Speaking Union. It also received the PEN Open Book Award. The family of Thelonious Monk, notably his son T. S. Monk, granted Kelley access to rare historical documents for his biography.

Kelley's 2012 book, Africa Speaks, America Answers: Modern Jazz in Revolutionary Times (2012), explores the relationship between jazz and Africa in the era of decolonization and Civil Rights. His works in progress include A World to Gain: A History of African Americans, with Earl Lewis and Tera Hunter, and a biography of journalist and adventurer Grace Halsell.

== Bibliography ==
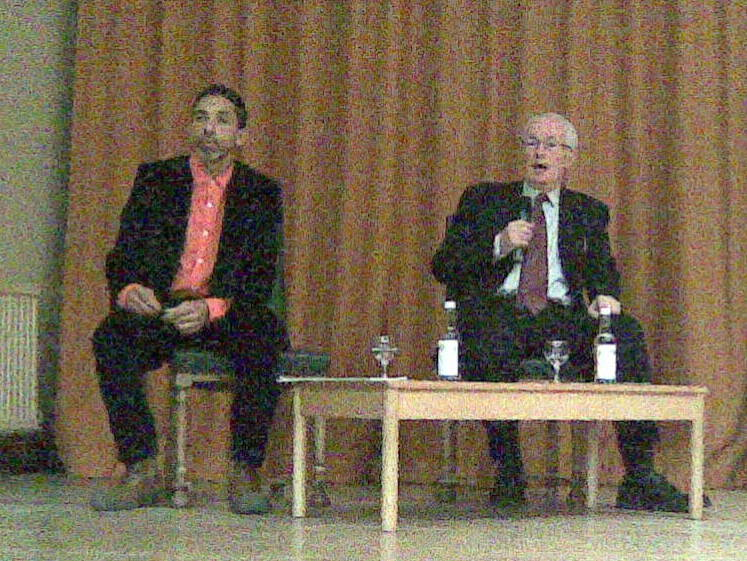
Robin Blackburn (right) after giving one of the Oxford Amnesty Lectures, with Kelley, who chaired the event, 2010.

- Hammer and Hoe: Alabama Communists During the Great Depression (Chapel Hill: University of North Carolina Press, 1990) ISBN 9781469625485
- Race Rebels: Culture, Politics, and the Black Working Class (New York: The Free Press, 1994) ISBN 978-0029167069
- Co-edited with Sidney J. Lemelle, Imagining Home: Class, Culture, and Nationalism in the African Diaspora (London: Verso Books, 1995).
- Into the Fire: African Americans Since 1970 (New York: Oxford University Press, 1996) ISBN 978-0195087017
- Yo' Mama's DisFunktional!: Fighting the Culture Wars in Urban America (Boston: Beacon Press, 1997)
- Co-written with Howard Zinn and Dana Frank, Three Strikes: The Fighting Spirit of Labor's Last Century (Boston: Beacon Press, 2001)
- Freedom Dreams: The Black Radical Imagination (Boston: Beacon Press, 2002). Revised and expanded for a 20th anniversary edition in 2022.
- Co-edited with Earl Lewis, To Make Our World Anew: A History of African Americans (New York: Oxford University Press, 2000). Two-volume edition, 2004.
- Thelonious Monk: The Life and Times of an American Original (New York: The Free Press, 2009) ISBN 9781439190463
- Co-edited with Franklin Rosemont, Surrealism - Black, Brown and Beige: Writings and Images from Africa and the African Diaspora (Austin: University of Texas Press, 2009)
- Africa Speaks, America Answers: Modern Jazz in Revolutionary Times (Cambridge, Mass.: Harvard University Press, 2012)
- Co-edited with Stephen Tuck, The Other Special Relationship: Race, Rights and Riots in Britain and the United States (New York: Palgrave, 2015)
- Co-edited with Jesse Benjamin, Walter Rodney, The Russian Revolution: A View From the Third World (New York: Verso, 2018)
