= Earl Lewis =

American academic

Academic background
- Education: Concordia College, University of Minnesota

Academic work
- Discipline: History
- Institutions: University of California at Berkeley, University of Michigan, Andrew W. Mellon Foundation

Earl Lewis is the founding director of the Center for Social Solutions and professor of history at the University of Michigan. He was president of the Andrew W. Mellon Foundation from 2013 to 2018. Before his appointment as the president of the Andrew W. Mellon Foundation, Lewis served for over eight years as Provost and Executive Vice President for Academic Affairs and as the Asa Griggs Candler Professor of History and African American Studies at Emory University. He was the university's first African-American provost and at the time the highest-ranking African-American administrator in the university's history.

== Education ==
Earl Lewis graduated with degree in history and psychology from Concordia College. He obtained his PhD in history from the University of Minnesota.

== Philanthropic and academic career ==
Earl Lewis became the sixth President of The Andrew W. Mellon Foundation in March 2013. Under his guidance, the Foundation has reaffirmed its commitment to the humanities, the arts, and higher education by emphasizing the importance of continuity and change. A noted social historian, Mr. Lewis has held faculty appointments at the University of California at Berkeley (1984–89), and the University of Michigan (1989–2004). He has championed the importance of diversifying the academy, enhancing graduate education, re-visioning the liberal arts, exploring the role of digital tools for learning, and connecting universities to their communities. Prior to joining The Andrew W. Mellon Foundation, Lewis served as Provost and Executive Vice President for Academic Affairs and the Asa Griggs Candler Professor of History and African American Studies at Emory University. As Provost, he led academic affairs and academic priority setting for the university.

He is the author and co-editor of seven books, including The African American Urban Experience: Perspectives from the Colonial Period to the Present (with Joe William Trotter and Tera W. Hunter, Palgrave Macmillan, 2004); Defending Diversity: Affirmative Action at the University of Michigan (with Jeffrey S. Lehman and Patricia Gurin, University of Michigan Press, 2004); Love on Trial: An American Scandal in Black and White (with Heidi Ardizzone, WW Norton, 2001); the award-winning To Make Our World Anew: A History of African Americans (with Robin D. G. Kelley, Oxford University Press, 2000); In Their Own Interests: Race, Class and Power in 20th Century Norfolk (University of California Press, 1991); as well as the 11-volume The Young Oxford History of African Americans (with Robin D. G. Kelley, Oxford University Press, 1995–97); and the award-winning book series American Crossroads (University of California Press).

A native of Tidewater, Virginia, Lewis earned an undergraduate degree in history and psychology from Concordia College in Moorhead, Minnesota, and a PhD in history from the University of Minnesota. He has been a fellow of the American Academy of Arts and Sciences since 2008.

In 2015, Lewis was awarded an honorary Doctor of Humane Letters from Rutgers University-Newark, an honorary Doctor of Humane Letters from University of Cincinnati and an honorary Doctor of Humane Letters from Dartmouth College; he also received an honorary Doctor of Humanities from Concordia College in 2002; Outstanding Achievement Award from the University of Minnesota in 2001; and the Harold R. Johnson Diversity Service Award from the University of Michigan in 1999.

== Positions currently and formerly held ==
He is a current or past member of a number of editorial boards and boards of directors, including the Graduate Record Exam, Southern Spaces, and the American Council of Learned Societies. He is the past chair of the board of directors of The Council of Graduate Schools and is National Chair of the Woodrow Wilson Foundation's Responsive Ph.D. Project. Lewis's research and projects have been funded by the Rockefeller, Ford, Mellon, and National Science foundations.

== Awards ==
Lewis is a member of the American Academy of Arts and Sciences. In 1999, Lewis was a recipient of the University of Michigan's Harold R. Johnson Diversity Service Award. He has been awarded honorary degrees from Clark University and Southwestern University (2017); Carnegie Mellon University (2016); the University of Cincinnati, Rutgers University-Newark and Dartmouth College (2015); and Concordia College (2002)

Lewis was awarded the National Humanities Medal by President Joe Biden on March 21, 2023. Biden awarded Lewis this medal because of his contributions to the field of Black history and his commitment to diversity in academia.
