= Tera Hunter =

American historian

- Born: Miami, Florida
- Education: Duke University; Yale University
- Occupations: Historian, professor
- Employer: Princeton University
- Notable work: To 'Joy My Freedom
- Title: Professor of History and African-American Studies

Tera Hunter is an American scholar of African-American history and gender. She holds the Edwards Professor of American History Endowed Chair at Princeton University. She specializes in the study of gender, race, and labor in the history of the Southern United States.

== Early life ==
Hunter was born in Miami, Florida. She graduated with Distinction in History from Duke University, then earned an M.Phil. and Ph.D. in history from Yale University.

== Career ==
Hunter taught at the University of North Carolina at Chapel Hill, and then Carnegie Mellon University, before joining the faculty of Princeton in 2007.

Hunter published her first book, To 'Joy My Freedom: Southern Black Women's Lives and Labors After the Civil War, in 1997. To 'Joy My Freedom is an account of the lives of southern African American women, specifically domestic workers in Atlanta, from the end of slavery through the beginnings of the Great Migration. She details the many struggles of African American washerwomen in Atlanta to control where they worked and for how long, how much they were paid, how their children were raised, and particularly the right to control their own bodies. The book was specifically noted for focusing on working-class women rather than middle- and upper-class women, who are more commonly treated in historical analyses of the period, in part because written records about higher class people are more common. To 'Joy My Freedom won the H. L. Mitchell Award from the Southern Historical Association, the Letitia Brown Memorial Book Prize from the Association of Black Women's Historians, and the Book of the Year Award in 1997 from the International Labor History Association. The book was the focus of a symposium in the journal Labor History.

In 2017, Hunter published Bound in Wedlock: Slave and Free Black Marriage in the Nineteenth Century. The book examines how enslavement affected the marriage practices and family lives of African Americans, and how the legacy of slavery continued to do so in the decades following the end of slavery. Bound in Wedlock chronicles a variety of types of intimate relationships, from highly temporary arrangements to ones that were as permanent as possible, both within and outside of formal legal marriage institutions. Hunter analyzes the complicated legality of marital unions between enslaved people, and argues that legal definitions of marriage were often used to break apart the family structures of enslaved people. Hunter also studies the status of marriage law during the Civil War, and in the antebellum era.

In 2018, Hunter was named the Edwards Professor of American History at Princeton University. She gave the keynote address at the unveiling of the statue of William B. Gould.

== Bibliography ==
- To 'Joy My Freedom: Southern Black Women's Lives and Labors After the Civil War (Harvard University Press, 1998)
- ed. The African American Urban Experience: Perspectives from the Colonial Period to the Present, with Joe Trotter and Earl Lewis (Palgrave Macmillan, 2004)
- ed. Dialogues of Dispersal: Gender, Sexuality and African Diasporas, with Sandra Gunning and Michele Mitchell (Wiley-Blackwell, 2004)
- African American Labor History: A Survey of the Scholarship from Jim Crow to the New Millennium (2006)
- The Making of a People: A History of African-Americans, with Robin D. G. Kelley and Earl Lewis (W. W. Norton, 2010)
- Bound in Wedlock: Slave and Free Black Marriage in the Nineteenth Century (Harvard University Press, 2017)
