= Nan Wood Graham =

American artist's model

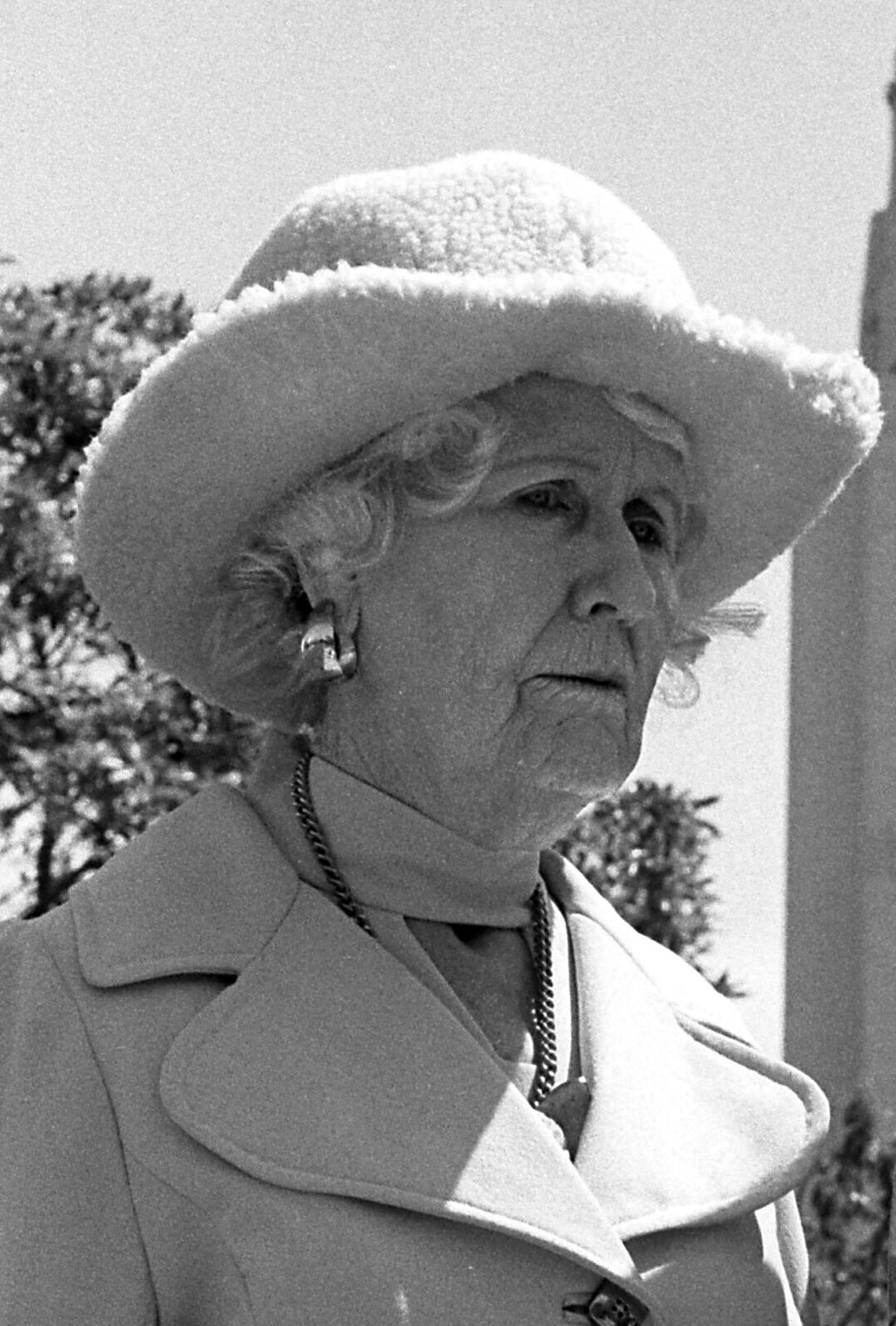
- Nan Wood Graham in 1977
- Born: Nan Wood; July 26, 1899; Anamosa, Iowa, United States
- Died: December 14, 1990 (aged 91); Menlo Park, California, United States
- Occupation(s): Artist, art teacher
- Relatives: Grant Wood (brother)

Nan Wood Graham (July 26, 1899 – December 14, 1990) was an American artist and art teacher. She was the sister of painter Grant Wood. She is best known as the model for the woman in her brother's most famous painting, American Gothic (1930).

== Personal life ==
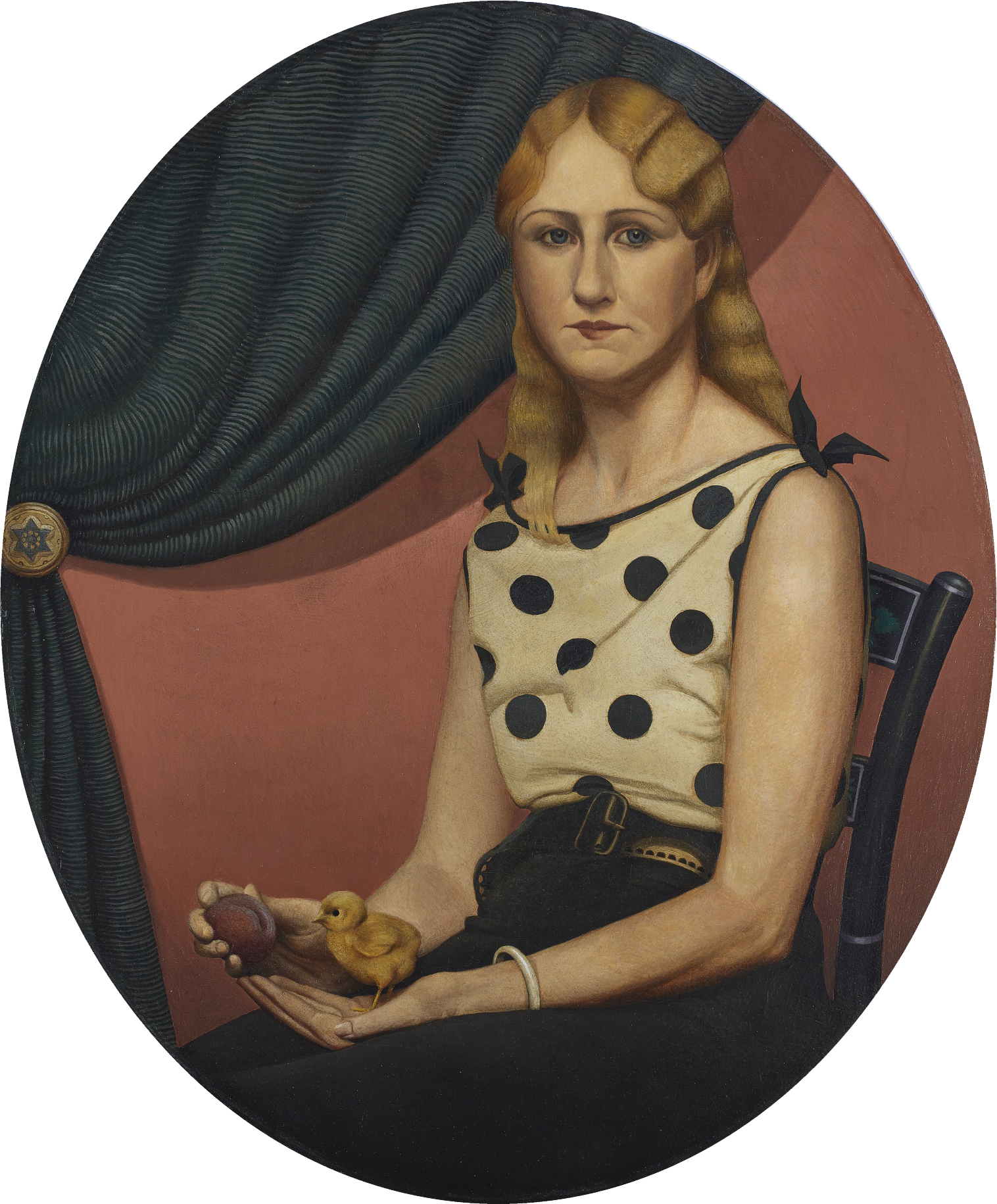
Portrait of Nan, by Grant Wood, 1933

Graham was born on July 26, 1899, on a farm near Anamosa, Iowa. Her parents were Francis M. and Hattie Wood and she had three older brothers, including painter Grant Wood. She was 16 months of age when her father, who was a farmer, died. She then moved to Cedar Rapids, Iowa, with her mother and brothers, moving six times within Iowa in all during her mother's life. As a child, Graham enjoyed painting, including on glass. Once the money earned from the farm was depleted, her brother Grant supported Graham and their mother financially. Graham attended high school in Cedar Rapids and then business college. Upon graduation, she attended nightly art school classes and was an art supervisor assistant within Cedar Rapids public schools.

She married real estate broker and investor Edward Graham in 1924. Her own artwork included sewing, making collages out of tissues, and painting glass. In 1938, Graham was featured in a Cedar Rapids Gazette story about her designs and painted glass. She exhibited her artwork in Iowa art salons and New York. The animal pictures that she painted and showed in New York were often used on ornaments, screens, decorative panels, play-rooms, and more. Graham wrote a story about herself in an issue of the magazine Coronet.

Graham traveled throughout the United States with her husband and then they later traveled worldwide. They decided to live in Riverside, California, and Edward entered the real estate business there. After her husband died in 1967, Graham moved into a house that was close to their old one. She later made around 20 scrapbooks of Grant's life which were microfilmed by the Archives of American Art within the Smithsonian Institution. In 1984, she was nearing blindness and moved to a nursing home, later dying there on December 14, 1990. In 1993, her memoir, My Brother, Grant Wood, was posthumously published by the State Historical Society of Iowa.

== American Gothic ==
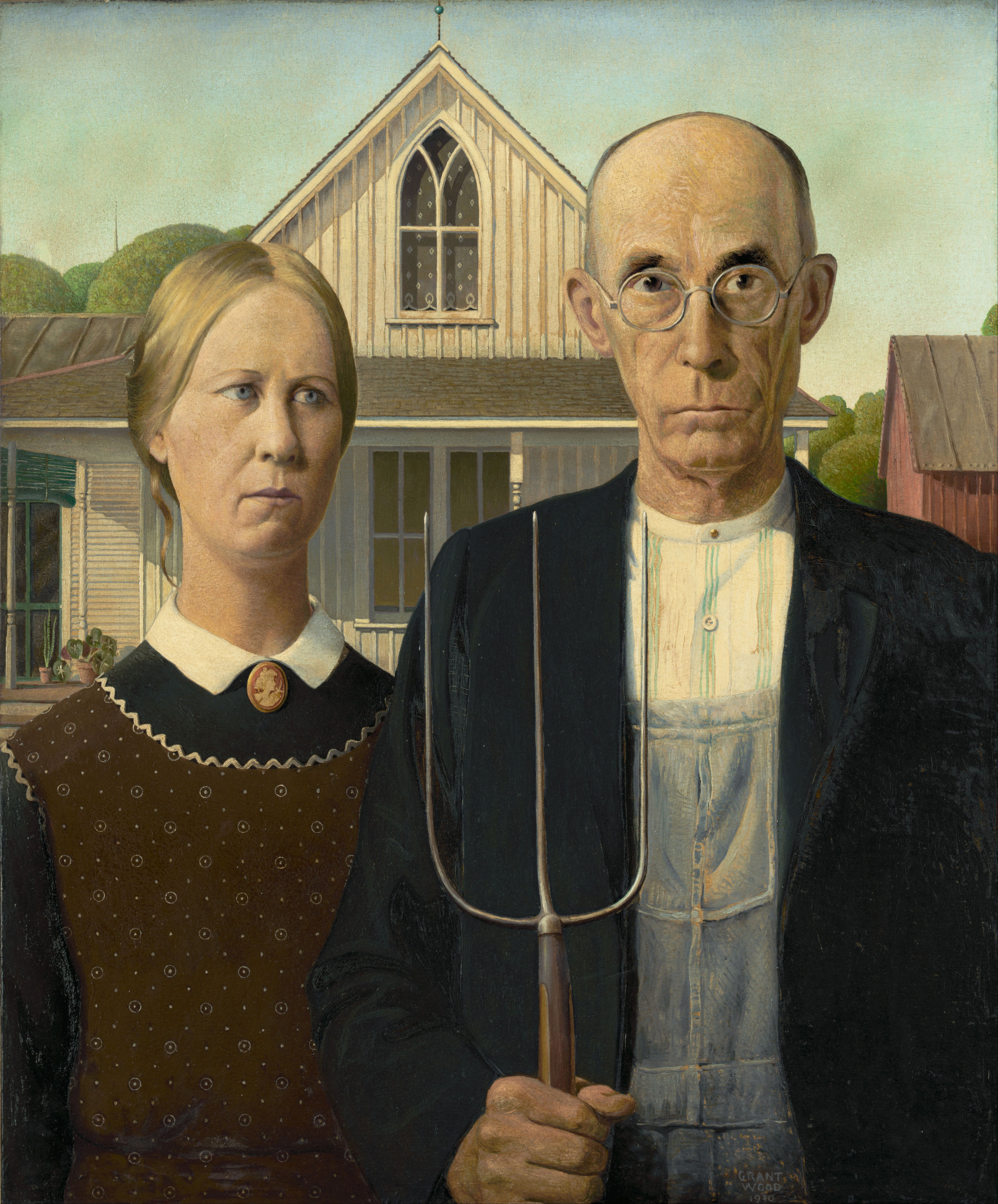
American Gothic

In 1928, Graham's brother Grant Wood returned after a working trip to Munich, Germany, and he felt inspired to paint a picture of a cottage that was in Eldon, Iowa. Graham posed as the woman and their dentist, Byron McKeeby, posed as the male. People who saw the painting assumed that the portrayed couple was married, but Graham said that her brother intended it to be a picture of a farmer and his daughter. Grant stretched out Graham's face in the picture so that no one would be able to recognize her. Shortly after the painting was finished, the farmers and their wives nearby thought that they were being ridiculed. Those people became fans when they realized that Graham posed for the painting.

In 1977, the magazine Hustler showed a topless version of the painting. Graham was afraid that people would think that she authorized it.
