= List of United States post office murals in Iowa =

Following is a list of United States post office murals created in Iowa between 1934 and 1943.

Location	Mural title	Image	Artist	Date	Notes	NRHP listed
Ames	The Evolution of Corn		Lowell Houser	1938		
Audubon	Audubon's Trip Down the Ohio and Mississippi – 1820		Virginia Snedecker	1942		
Bloomfield	Autumn in Iowa		John Sharpe	1940	oil on canvas	
Clarion	Farm Scene		Paul Faulkner	1943		
Columbus Junction	Lovers Leap		Sante Graziani	1942		
Corning	Band Concert		Marion Gilmore	1941	Winner of the 48-State Mural Competition	
Corydon	Volunteer Fire Department		Marion Gilmore	1942		
Cresco	Iowa Farming		Richard Haines	1937		
DeWitt	Shucking Corn		John Bloom	1938	oil on canvas, on display at DeWitt City Hall	
Dubuque	Early Mississippi Steamboat		William E. L. Bunn	1936	oil on canvas	1985 CP
Dubuque	Early Settlers of Dubuque		Bertrand R. Adams	1937		
Emmetsburg	Conservation of Wildlife		Lee Allen	1940		
Forest City	Evening on the Farm		Orr C. Fisher	1942		
Hamburg	Peony Festival at Hamburg		William E. L. Bunn	1941	destroyed	
Harlan	The Farmer Feeding Industry		Richard Gates	1937		
Hawarden	Hunters		John Sharp	1942	oil on canvas	
Ida Grove	Preparations for the First County Fair in Ida Grove – 1872		Andrene Kauffman	1940		
Independence	Postman in Storm		Robert Tabor	1939		
Jefferson	The New Calf		Tom Savage	1938		
Knoxville	Pioneer Group at the Red Rock Line – 1845		Marvin Beerbohm	1941	oil on canvas	
Leon	Rural Free Delivery		Criss Glasell	1938		
Manchester	Iowa Farm Life		William E. Henning	1938		
Marion	Communication by Mail		Dan Rhodes	1939	restored in 200l; on display at Marion Heritage Center	
Missouri Valley	Iowa Fair		Francis Robert White	1938		
Monticello	Iowa Landscape –The Posdtman's Creed		William C. Palmer	1940	Three panels:	
Monticello	Iowa Landscape – Iowa State Motto		William C. Palmer	1940	Three panels:	
Monticello	Iowa Landscape – Song of Iowa		William C. Palmer	1940	Three panels:	
Mount Ayr	The Corn Parade		Orr C. Fisher	1941		
Mount Pleasant	Mount Pleasant in the Forties – The Farm		Dorothea Tomlinson	1939		
Mount Pleasant	Mount Pleasant in the Forties – The Town		Dorothea Tomlinson	1939		
New Hampton	Breaking the Colt		Tom Savage	1939		
Onawa	Soil Erosion and Control		Lee Allen	1938		
Osceola	Arrival of the First Train		Byron B. Boyd	1936		
Pella	Hollanders Settle in Pella		Byron B. Boyd	1938		
Rockwell City	Summer		John Sharp	1941		
Sigourney	Indian Harvest		Richard Olsen	1940		
Tipton	Cattle		John Bloom	1940		
Waverly	Letter From Home in 1856		Mildred Pelzer Lynch	1938		
