= Stone City Historic District =

Historic district in Iowa, United States

- U.S. National Register of Historic Places
- U.S. Historic district
- General Store

- Location within Iowa Location within the United States
- Location: 12828-12573 Stone City Rd., 12392-12340 Dearborn Rd., and 12381-12551 County Road X28; Stone City, Iowa
- Built: 1870-1913
- Architect: Beck, Guido; Green, John A.
- Architectural style: Late Victorian, Late 19th And 20th Century Revivals, Gabled cottage
- NRHP reference No.: 08001099
- Added to NRHP: November 21, 2008

The Stone City Historic District is located in Stone City, Iowa, United States. Listed on the National Register of Historic Places as a historic district in November 2008. The buildings of Stone City Historic District were constructed using Anamosa Limestone quarried locally and built between 1870 and 1913.

== History ==
In 1870 Henry Dearborn, owner of Stone City Quarries, built his home near his business. With the help of John Green Mr. Dearborn also built what became known as the General Store in 1897. The General Store at one time was the location of the town post office.

== Contributing properties ==
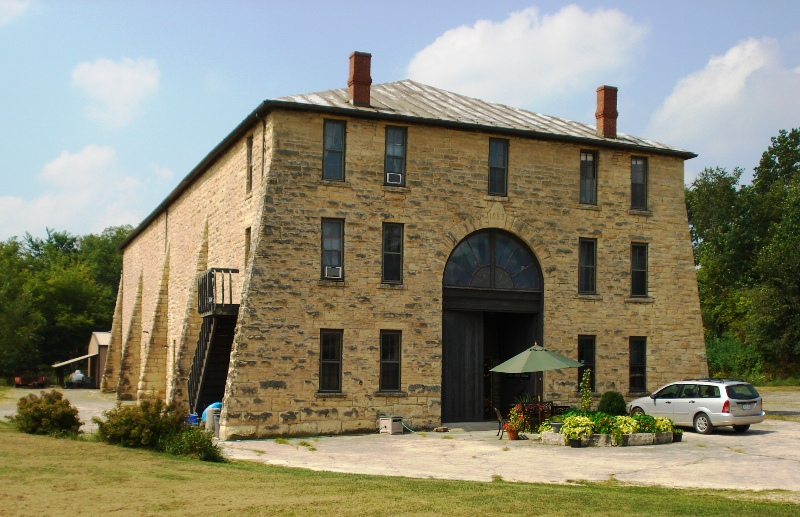
Stone Barn

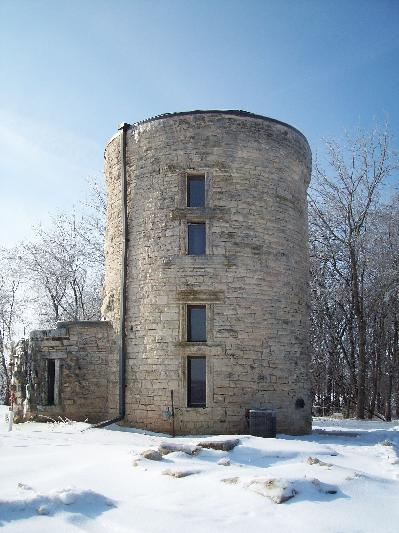
Stone Water Tower

- The John A. Green Estate (also known as the Green-Nissen Estate) covers 200 acres (0.81 km^{2}) of land. The estate consists of the Green mansion, ice house, water tower, barn, and office building were each built of Anamosa Limestone quarried from John Green's own local business. During the summers of 1932 and 1933 the Green Estate became the location of Stone City Art Colony.
- Construction began on St. Joseph's Church in 1913. The first mass was held in 1914. The church was designed by Dubuque, Iowa architect Guido Beck. The stained glass windows of the church were imported from Germany. The limestone used for the building was donated by local quarries. The labor to construct the church was also donated by city quarry businesses.
- The General Store was owned by Henry Dearborn. In the late 1890s he commissioned John Green to build the general store. In 1897 the city post office was moved from the Dearborn residence to the general store where it remained in operation until the government closed it down in 1954. The store was also headquarters for the village telegraph and was the town's only gas station. The store remained in the Dearborn family until the late 1950s.
