= Stone City (disambiguation) =

Stone City can refer to:

- Stone City, ancient fortified site within the modern city of Nanjing, China
- Stone City, former name of Lost City, California, United States
- Stone City (game), created for the Cold Stone Creamery
- Stone City, historic nickname for Joliet, Illinois, United States
- Stone City, Iowa historic town in Iowa, United States

- Stone City, Iowa (painting), 1930 painting by Grant Wood

== See also ==
- Stone Town, ancient fortified site in Zanzibar
