= Lee Allen =

Lee Allen may refer to:

- Lee Allen (wrestler) (1934–2012), wrestler and coach
- Lee Allen (baseball) (1915–1969), baseball historian
- Lee Allen (musician) (1927–1994), saxophone player
- Lee Allen (artist) (1910–2006), American artist and ocularist
- Lee Allen (motorcyclist), American motorcycle racer, see 1964 Grand Prix motorcycle racing season
- R. Lee Allen (1927–2017), American politician

== See also ==
- Lee Allen Zeno (1954–2026), American bassist
