= John A. Green Estate =

- U.S. National Register of Historic Places
- U.S. Historic district
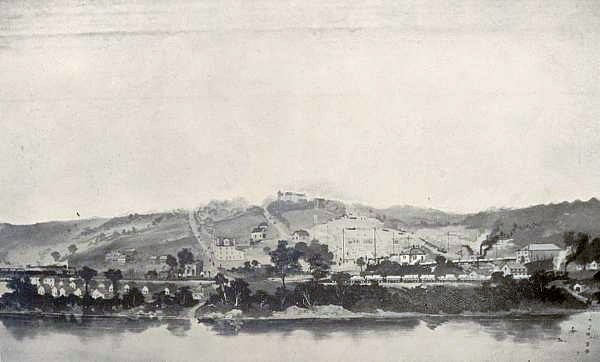
- John A. Green Estate late 1800s

- Location within Iowa Location within the United States
- Location: Off U.S. Route 151, Stone City, Iowa
- Coordinates: 42°6′40″N 91°21′5″W
- Area: 200 acres (0.81 km^{2})
- Built: 1882 - 1889
- Architect: Green, John A.
- Architectural style: Late Victorian
- NRHP reference No.: 78001232
- Added to NRHP: August 31, 1978

The John A. Green Estate (also known as the Green-Nissen Estate) is a historic property in Stone City, Iowa, United States. The estate covers 200 acres (0.81 km^{2}) of land. The buildings were constructed of Anamosa Limestone quarried from John Green's own local business. The estate was individually listed as a historic district on the U.S. National Register of Historic Places in 1978. It was included as a contributing property in the Stone City Historic District in 2008.

== History ==
John A. Green

On March 17, 1868, then a lonely spot in the wilderness, now the site of Stone City, Iowa, John A. Green opened the Champion quarries. For nearly fifty years, the quarries produced steadily, amounting to more than 4.5 billion dollars in sales. 1896 records indicate 1,000 men were employed among the quarries, carving 160,000 loads of stone in a single year with a market value of 3.75 million dollars. In his most productive years (1869-1890s), John Green operated three quarries (known as "Champion 1," "Champion 2," and "John Allen") using nearby Anamosa State Penitentiary labor.

In 1883 Green built a three-story hotel and opera house complex on his estate known as Columbia Hall. It was made of 500,000 tons of stone. The theater offered some of the most well known entertainers of the day. Columbia Hall was purchased in the 1930s and torn down in 1938 to use the stone elsewhere.

In 1920 200 acres (0.81 km^{2}) of the Green Estate was purchased by Frank Nissen. During the summers of 1932 and 1933 the estate became the location of Stone City Art Colony. In 1932, Grant Wood, Edward Rowan, and Adrian Dornbush established the Colony. With little more than $100 and a number of promissory notes based on the success of the art colony they leased 10 acres (40,000 m^{2}) of land on the estate. The parcel of leased land included the Green Mansion, the Ice House and Water Tower. The upstairs portion of the mansion was converted into a dormitory. The rest of the house was used for business offices, kitchen, a sculpture studio and showers for the men. The basement of the ice house was made into a bar called The Sickle and Sheaf where instructor/student Dennis Burlingame tended bar. The upper portion of the water tower was converted into an apartment where Adrian Dornbush lived, called Adrian's Tomb.

== Buildings and Structures ==
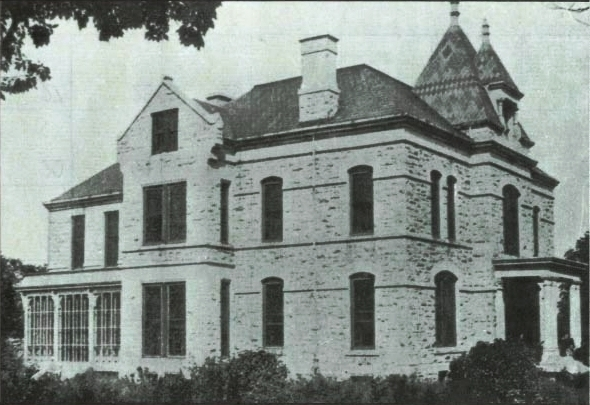
John A. Green Mansion

- Columbia Hall was a three-story hotel and opera house complex. It was completed in 1883 and made of 500,000 tons of stone. The theater offered some of the most well known entertainers of the day. Columbia Hall was purchased in the 1930s and torn down in 1938 to use the stone elsewhere. The foundation is all that remains.
- The Green Mansion was built in 1882 on a hill overlooking the city. The mansion had twenty rooms, seven Italian marble fireplaces, hand-painted murals, two baths, and a conservatory. In the early 1930s the Green family sold the estate to Frank Nissen. The Green mansion became the summer home of poet Paul Engle, son-in-law of Frank Nissen. In 1963 the Green Mansion was damaged by fire and torn down in the 1990s.

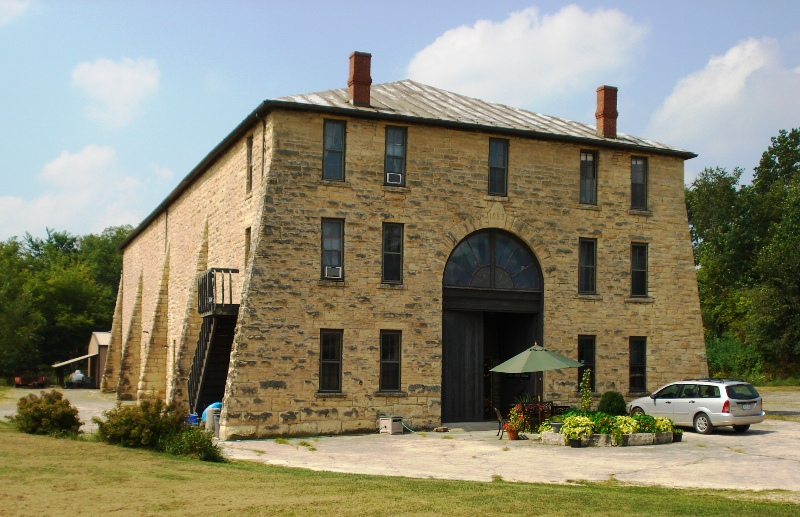
Stone Barn

- The Stone Barn was built in 1889 by John A. Green. The barn is 12,000 square feet (1,100 m^{2}) and stands 30 feet (9.1 m) high. There are a series of six buttresses along the length of the barn, each 3 feet (0.91 m) wide at the base. The barn was originally built to house draft horses for John Green's quarry business. The stables could hold up to 100 horses. The barn housed a blacksmith shop, a three-story loft, and housing quarters for stable attendants. Locals of Stone City say that it took 80 men 80 days to build the stone barn. Today the barn is a private home and welcome refuge for visitors to Stone City.

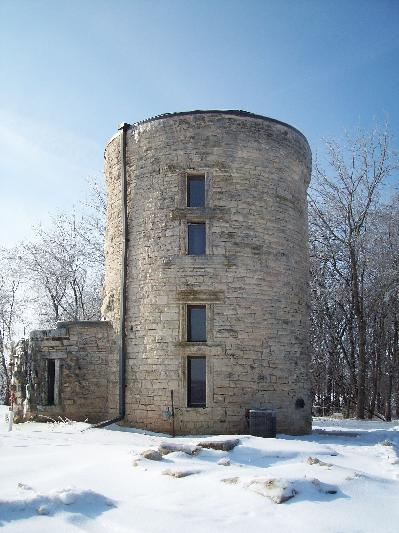
Stone Water Tower

- The Water Tower was built on a high point of the Green Estate. The tower served as the water source for the estate, which included John Green's limestone quarry business. In the summer of 1932, during Stone City Art Colony, the water tower was used as an apartment for art instructor Adrian Dornbush. Students at the colony referred to the water tower as Adrian's Tomb. In 2008 the water tower was purchased, remodeled, and made into a gift shop.

== See also ==
- National Register of Historic Places listings in Jones County, Iowa
