= Iowa City Press-Citizen =

Newspaper in Iowa City, Iowa

- The January 4, 2008, front page of Iowa City Press-Citizen
- Type: Daily newspaper
- Format: Broadsheet
- Owner: USA Today Co.
- Founded: 1920
- Headquarters: 123 N. Linn St. Iowa City, IA 52245; United States
- Circulation: 4,281
- Website: press-citizen.com

The Iowa City Press-Citizen is a daily newspaper published in Iowa City, Iowa, United States that serves most of Johnson County and portions of surrounding counties. Its primary competitors are The Gazette of Cedar Rapids, which has a news bureau in Iowa City, and The Daily Iowan, the University of Iowa's student newspaper.

== History ==
The Press-Citizen was formed in 1920 from the merger of two newspapers: the Democratic Iowa State Press, founded in 1860, and the Republican Iowa City Citizen, founded in 1891. Merritt Spiedel bought the Press-Citizen in 1921; Spiedel's company merged with the Gannett Company in 1977.

In 1937, Spiedel hired architect Henry L. Fisk as consulting architect for a new Streamline Moderne style building for the paper. Located at 319 E. Washington Street, the building also housed a mural by artist Mildred W. Pelzer, Symphony of Iowa. In 1966, the mural was restored by Forrest Bailey, who was commissioned by Richard Feddersen for the work. The painting was later donated by Fedderson to the Cedar Rapids Museum of Art.

The Press-Citizen switched from afternoon to morning publication on September 15, 1997. On August 29, 1999, the Press-Citizen began publishing a Sunday edition that includes local news and sports sections packaged with the Sunday state edition of another Gannett newspaper, The Des Moines Register.

On February 15, 2015, the Press-Citizen announced that it would be discontinuing the Sunday edition on March 1 of the same year. Subscribers instead receive The Des Moines Sunday Register on Sundays, which includes articles written by Press-Citizen reporters.

In January 2025, the newspaper announced it will switch from carrier to postal delivery.
