= Ann Royer =

American painter

- Born: 1933 (age 92–93); Sioux City, Iowa, U.S.
- Education: Colorado College; University of Minnesota, Duluth

Ann Royer is a painter and sculptor living and working in Cedar Rapids, Iowa. Her work consists mostly of abstract nudes and horses. She was born in Sioux City, Iowa in 1933.

== Education and work ==
Royer graduated from the School of Art at Colorado College. She later attended the University of Minnesota, Duluth. She studied art, against her family's initial wishes.

Royer credits a 1975 Chinese Art Exposition as her greatest source of inspiration. In 1966, she attended the Congress of Infectious Diseases in the USSR.

In 2008, Royer was the subject of a short documentary by Brett Edward Stout. It was shown at the Cedar Rapids Independent Film Festival and on KCRG TV9.

== Exhibitions ==
Royer's work is prominently featured in the Cornerhouse Art Gallery. Between 1975 and 1997, her work was exhibited at the Sioux City Art Center, the Museum of Art Cedar Rapids, the Jewish Community Center Houston, Engel Gallery Jerusalem, the Zoma Gallery New York, the Ice House Dallas, and the Osburne Gallery in St. Paul, Minnesota.

== Public sculptures ==
Royer was commissioned by the city to create several large bronze public sculptures in downtown Cedar Rapids, Iowa. Her large sculptures include Pas De Deux on the corner of 1st Avenue and 3rd Street, Between Friends on the corner of 3rd Avenue and 3rd Street, and a sculpture at Mount Mercy College.
