= King Memorial Chapel =

- U.S. National Register of Historic Places
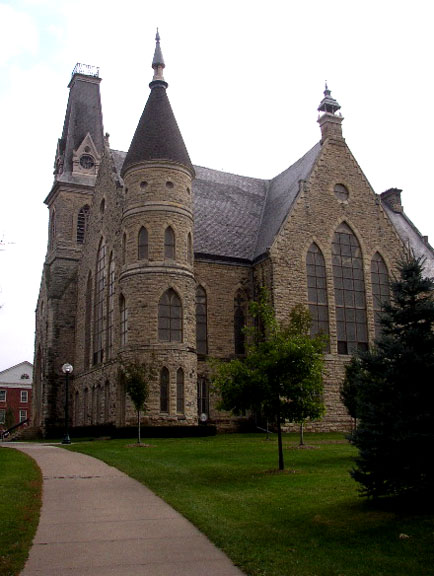

- Location within Iowa Location within the United States
- Location: Cornell College campus Mount Vernon, Iowa
- Coordinates: 41°55′30″N 91°25′25″W
- Built: 1876-1882
- Architect: Chapman, Cass
- Architectural style: Gothic
- NRHP reference No.: 76000782
- Added to NRHP: November 7, 1976

King Memorial Chapel is located on the Cornell College campus in Mount Vernon, Iowa. The cornerstone was laid in 1875, and the chapel was completed in 1882. The building is a Gothic Revival design made of yellow Anamosa Limestone quarried in nearby Stone City, Iowa, and has been listed on the National Register of Historic Places since 1976. The building's interior is largely unchanged, and still sports wood-beamed ceilings. At its highest point, the clocktower is 130 feet with four bells, one of which weighs 2,000 pounds. In 1931, the chapel was remodeled and the college installed a Moller organ, which has 3,800 pipes.

== History ==
Dr. William T. King was made the president of Cornell College when he came back to the college given the end of the American Civil War, and he is the person after whom the chapel is named. The college was not particularly profitable, and financial difficulties were a significant reason for delays in the project's completion. The contractor abandoned construction upon going bankrupt. The ensuing financial issues almost bankrupted the college. In the end, the faculty contributed their paychecks to keep the college from ruin. Once construction was finished, the chapel was used daily by students from Cornell College. During the first world war, the lower "Day Chapel" was used as a mess hall while the college worked to treat the epidemic of Spanish Flu that broke out among the students.

The chapel was heavily damaged by the 2020 Iowa derecho and has been closed since then. Repair work had not yet started as of October 2026.
