= Mildred W. Pelzer =

American artist (1889-1985)

- 1950 photograph of Pelzer by Hironaka
- Born: Mildred Lenore Weenink; October 9, 1889; Auburn, Fond du Lac County, Wisconsin
- Died: April 24, 1985 (aged 95); Orlando, Florida
- Other names: Mildred Pelzer Lynch
- Occupations: artist, art instructor
- Years active: 1912-1969

Mildred W. Pelzer (October 9, 1889 – April 24, 1985) was an American art teacher, artist and muralist known for her work in public spaces. In addition to the mural for the post office mural project in Waverly, Iowa, she completed eight murals for the Hotel Jefferson, of Iowa City and a mural for the lobby of the Press-Citizen. In addition to her mural work, Pelzer was known for portraits, floral works and landscapes.

== Early life ==
Mildred Lenore Weenink was born on October 9, 1889, in Auburn, Fond du Lac County, Wisconsin, to Eudora D. (née Thompson) and Henry D. Weenink. By the time she was two years old, her family had moved to Dillon, Montana, where she completed her schooling, graduating from the Montana State Normal School in 1909. Immediately upon her graduation, Weenink applied and was accepted to begin studies at the Pratt Institute, where she entered the following year. After two years of study at Pratt, Weenink graduated in 1912.

== Career ==
Upon completing her schooling, Weenink was hired to teach at the Montana School for the Deaf, Blind, and Backward Children, in Boulder, Montana, but left after one term. Continuing her studies, Weenink attended Columbia University. From 1915 to 1916, Weenink taught in the public schools in Bedford, Indiana, before going to serve as director of the art department at the Dakota State Normal School in Madison, South Dakota. On January 1, 1917, in Dillon, Weenink married fellow teacher, Louis Pelzer, and they made their home in Iowa City, where Louis was teaching history at the University of Iowa.

Once relocated, Pelzer began studying with Grant Wood and served as his publicist. She also studied with Marvin Cone and began her own career, painting portraits of college faculty and raised their two sons, Lorne Parker Pelzer and Henry Pelzer. In 1934, Pelzer was commissioned by the Works Progress Administration to create eight murals for the Hotel Jefferson, the largest structure in Iowa City at the time. The murals were four feet high by twelve feet long and depicted historic scenes from the development of the city from settlement to the twentieth century, spanning the period between the meeting of the Fox leader Poweshiek and settlers from the East to the arrival of automobiles. Pelzer confirmed historical details with her husband, who was a history professor. At the dedication banquet, attended by 150 people, the head of the political science department, Benjamin Shambaugh noted the significance of Pelzer's achievement to document the history of the state with artwork. That same year, she also produced a map, Iowa: Prairie Chronicles in Picture which covered significant historical events in the state and their locations.

Her work was known nationally, having appeared on the cover of the July 1934 issue of Better Homes and Gardens. She also exhibited in Kansas City, Minneapolis and Philadelphia, as well as throughout Iowa and was chosen for a painting by the Packard Motor Company. Pelzer's mural for the Iowa City Press-Citizen Building took two years to prepare. In 1935, the preliminary painting for Symphony of Iowa was the state’s entry for an exhibition hosted by the General Federation of Women's Clubs (GFWC) held in Detroit. When the Press-Citizen Building was completed in 1937, the painting was installed in the lobby. Around 1961, six of the Jefferson murals were placed in storage, having faded with light exposure. In 1966, At the Iowa City Landing, Symphony of Iowa, The Railroad Comes—1856 and We Build the Capitol were restored by Forrest Bailey who was commissioned by Richard T. Feddersen. In August 1937, Pelzer's painting of the Grinnell College campus was donated by Henry Hromek and his wife to the college in memory of their son.

A month later, Pelzer won the federal commission to complete the post office mural for Waverly, Iowa, as part of the Section of Painting and Sculpture′s projects, later called the Section of Fine Arts, of the Treasury Department. The mural, A Letter from Home in 1856 depicts a scene of a couple on their farm, where the wife had brought a letter from their previous home to the field. As her husband paused his plowing, the wife read the letter to him, as their child grasped at her mother's skirts. In 2014, the post office, along with 40 other buildings in Waverly's historic district, were listed on the National Register of Historic Places.

In 1940, Pelzer was one of the founders of the Iowa Artists Association and served as the chair of the organization. That same year, she was recognized with a national award given by the GFWC for her work in promoting art and with young artists. Tragedy struck the family during World War II, when both of their sons were killed in action. In the midst of their grief, Pelzer's husband Lewis died of a heart attack in 1946. After her husband's death, Pelzer focused on her painting, working in Florida, Hawaii, and Iowa and competed in several shows before moving to Hawaii in 1949 to create a series of gouache landscapes. Her Hawaiian landscapes were noted for their vibrant colors and for capturing movement. A portrait, Black Pearls received first place in an oil painting competition and she was asked by a local merchant to create a line of hand-painted dresses. She left Hawaii in 1950 to complete commission work in Cuba and Florida and resettled in Florida in 1952, after sending a floral painting to Wesley House, the new Methodist student center at Iowa University.

Later that year, Pelzer remarried on 25 July 1952. Her second husband was retired Major General George Arthur Lynch. After her marriage, Pelzer-Lynch continued to paint with the encouragement of her husband. When he died in 1962, she traveled to Hawaii, Mexico, Spain and attended international exhibitions including the Venice Biennale and documenta in Kassel. A retrospective of her works was held in 1969 at the Loch Haven Art Center of Orlando.

== Death and legacy ==
Lynch died on April 24, 1985, in Orlando, Florida. She and her first husband's papers were donated to the State Historical Society of Iowa and the collection, Pelzer family papers spans the period from 1904-1962. An annual scholarship is awarded in her name in art, American history and music, through a fund Lynch established prior to her death and a graduate fellowship bearing her name is given to art scholars pursuing graduate level studies at the University of Iowa. In 1973, the Iowa State Bank and Trust company restored two of the murals and rehung them in the Longfellow School. In 1992, the four murals restored by Feddersen were donated to the Cedar Rapids Museum of Art. A biography, Historic Scenes by Mildred Pelzer 1934: The Pampered and Tragic Life of an Iowa City Artist by Bob Hibbs was published by the Johnson County Historical Society in 2009.
