= St. Joseph's Roman Catholic Church (Stone City, Iowa) =

- U.S. National Register of Historic Places
- U.S. Historic district – Contributing property
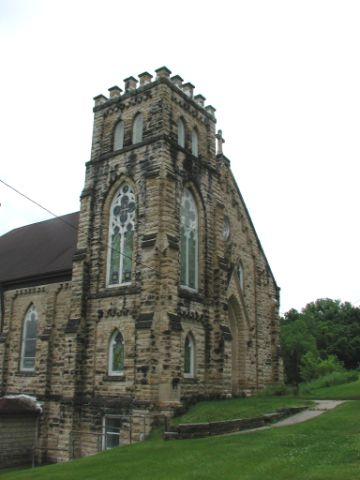
- St. Joseph's Roman Catholic Church

- Location within Iowa Location within the United States
- Location: Stone City, Jones County, Iowa
- Coordinates: 42°6′50″N 91°21′18″W
- Area: less than one acre
- Built: 1913
- Built by: Otto Braun
- Architect: Guido Beck
- Architectural style: Late Gothic Revival
- Part of: Stone City Historic District (ID08001099)
- NRHP reference No.: 05000904
- Added to NRHP: August 24, 2005

St. Joseph's Roman Catholic Church is a former parish church of the Archdiocese of Dubuque located in Stone City, Iowa, United States. Catholics in Stone City were initially served by priests from Cedar Rapids and Anamosa. Mass was celebrated in parishioner's homes until 1881 when permission was granted to use a large hall in Stone City. The parish was established in 1901 and the cornerstone for the church building was laid in 1913. It was completed later the same year. The first mass was celebrated in 1914. The church was designed by Dubuque, Iowa architect Guido Beck. The stained glass windows of the church were imported from Germany. The limestone used for the building was donated by city quarries. Otto Braun served as the contractor, and the labor to construct the church was also donated by local quarry businesses. The lower level of the building houses the parish hall. The rear of the church can be seen anchoring the left side of Grant Wood's painting Stone City (1930). The parish started to lose parishioners in the 1920s when the stone quarries started to decline. Its size increased again in the 1950s before economic factors once again caused it to decline. The archdiocese closed the parish in 1992, and church building became an oratory. A year later, the church's rectory was auctioned off on June 27, 1993.

The church building was individually listed on the National Register of Historic Places in 2005. It was included as a contributing property in the Stone City Historic District in 2008.

== See also ==
- Saint Joseph
