= Persis Robertson =

American painter and printmaker (1896–1992)

Persis Robertson (née Weaver; May 1896 – June 22, 1992) was an American painter and printmaker.

== Biography ==
Born Persis Weaver in Des Moines, Iowa, Robertson was the daughter of attorney James B. Weaver and sculptor and woodcarver Fayette Atkins Weaver. She studied at Wells College, from which she graduated in 1917; her interests there included French, theater, and literature. In 1932 and 1933 she attended both sessions of the Stone City Art Colony, and it was two other members of the colony, Lowell Houser and Adrian Dornbush, who taught her lithography at the Art Students Workshop in Des Moines later in the decade. She married Albert J. Robertson in 1918, and with him lived in Minneapolis until 1924, when the couple relocated to Des Moines. There they remained until 1953, when Albert received a position in the Eisenhower administration and the couple moved to Washington, D.C. Persis at this time gradually left lithography behind, but she continued in creative pursuits, taking up paper cutting later in life. After her husband's death, she relocated once again, this time to Bridgeport, Connecticut, where she was living until her death there on June 22, 1992.

Robertson participated in numerous group shows during her career, including at the Art Institute of Chicago, the Library of Congress, the Corcoran Gallery of Art, the Philadelphia Print Club, the Brooklyn Museum, and the Pennsylvania Academy of Fine Arts. She presented work in solo exhibitions as well, and often won prizes at the art salon of the Iowa State Fair. She was also active with her husband in artistic circles in Des Moines; the two sat on the planning committee for the Des Moines Art Center, and she started the Art Students Workshop at the public library with Florence Cowles Kruidenier. An undated lithograph, Front Door, is owned by the Smithsonian American Art Museum.

Robertson was cremated. She is buried beside her husband at Lakewood Cemetery in Minneapolis. The couple were the parents of two daughters, Persis and Madeline.
