= Marjorie Ann Nuhn =

American painter

Marjorie Anna Nuhn
- Born: 31 October 1898; Cedar Falls, Iowa
- Died: 1988 (aged 89–90); Cedar Falls, Iowa
- Education: University of Northern Iowa; Chicago Academy of Fine Arts; Chicago Art Institute
- Known for: Painting

Marjorie Ann Nuhn (October 31, 1898–January 1988) was an American painter who focused on watercolor. She was part of the Stone City Art Colony and studied under many teachers, most notably Adrian Dornbush. After the colony, she continued to travel around North America looking for inspiration for her work. She came back to Cedar Falls when she retired, then died in January 1988.

== Life ==
Nuhn was born in Cedar Falls, Iowa and raised by her parents, William and Anna Nuhn. She also had two younger siblings. Her brother Ferner was born in 1903 and her sister Hilda was born in 1906. She grew up in Cedar Falls, attending elementary school through high school there her entire life. She even stayed in town for college, graduating in 1926 from the University of Northern Iowa with a certificate to teach kindergarten.

After receiving encouragement from her instructors, Nuhn decided to forgo teaching to pursue her career as an artist. In 1929, she enrolled in the Chicago Academy of Fine Arts. It was here that she learned about the various media that she used for the rest of her career. She continued her studies at the Chicago Art Institute. There she learned a lot about watercolor painting but she really grew in this medium when she went to the Stone City Art Colony.

Nuhn attended the colony from 1932 to 1933. While she was there, artists like Grant Wood and John Steuart Curry were instructors. Adrian Dornbush, her faculty mentor at the colony, was the one most involved with her learning. Out of all the instructors there, he was able to really identify Nuhn's strengths and help develop them while she was there. Once she left the colony, she returned home to continue developing her artwork on her own.

Her style was very abstract with its use of watercolor to morph and blend color to create an image. While it was representational, houses and trees are clearly what they are, it wasn't realistic by any means. She found success at home with small exhibitions, but she felt like she needed a change. Most of her work at the time focused on her home state of Iowa. While this wasn't shameful to her, she wanted to broaden her scope and paint other scenes from around the country.

Her interest in Native American culture and themes brought her to many places in the US. These locations include Vermont, California, New Mexico, and Arizona. While she lived in New Mexico, she attended some classes at the Arsuna School of Fine Arts. She also made many trips in the 1960s to Yellowstone National Park. The colored hot pools at the park were what fascinated her the most. She dedicated many abstract pieces of hers to these natural springs.

Her trips eventually took her out of the country. She spent about ten months in Mexico, from 1939 to 1940, visiting Taxco, Mexico City and elsewhere. The following year, she went to Guatemala, spending three months visiting locations such as Guatemala City and Antigua. She would return to Mexico in 1949, to look for further inspiration. The subjects she really liked painting from both locations were the people. All of her trips were done in a car on her own. She would pack enough clothes and art supplies to last the whole trip. It is also noted that she had learned to be very resourceful on her long trips.

She found a lot of success in Cedar Falls. Whenever she came back home from her trips, she would have new pieces to show at local exhibitions. Many local galleries in town like the Cedar Falls Art Association, benefited from the crowds she drew to every new opening. Nuhn also had many successful solo exhibitions in other parts of the US. These locations include Chicago, Santa Fe, New York, Des Moines and Dubuque.

In 1975, the University of Northern Iowa gave a retrospective exhibition of her and her artwork, located at the Maucker Union. After a few more exhibitions, she retired to her home town and lived at a local health care center until her death.

Passion for Beauty: Marjorie Nuhn, Watercolorist was published in 2021 by Final Thursday Press. This book includes a biography by the artist's brother, Ferner Nuhn, and reproductions of over 20 of her original watercolors.

== Principle exhibitions ==
- 1938 - The Artists Union, Chicago
- 1940 - The Santa Fe Art Museum
- 1940 - The Taos Art Gallery
- 1941 - The Alma Reed Gallery, NYC
- 1943 – 1953 - The Des Moines Art Center
- 1952 - Terry Art Institution, Indianapolis
- 1975 - The Maucker Union, University of Northern Iowa, Cedar Falls
- 1985 - The Metropolitan Gallery, Cedar Falls
