= Ann R. Cannon =

American statistics educator

- Born: 8 November 1966 (age 59)
- Education: B.A. Mathematics, Grinnell College M.S. Statistics, Iowa State University Ph.D Statistics, Iowa State University
- Occupations: Watson M. Davis Professor of Mathematics and Statistics at Cornell College
- Known for: Statistics education
- Notable work: "STAT2: Building Models for a World of Data" (2012) "STAT2: Modeling with Regression and ANOVA" (2019)
- Honours: Fellow of the American Statistics Association (2019) Mu Sigma Rho William D. Warde Statistics Education Award (2017)

Ann C. Russey Cannon is an American statistics educator, the Watson M. Davis Professor of Mathematics and Statistics at Cornell College in Iowa.

Cannon is a graduate of Grinnell College, and completed a doctorate in statistics at Iowa State University in 1994. Her dissertation, Signal Detection Using Categorical Temporal Data, was jointly supervised by William Q. Meeker Jr. and Noel Cressie.

Cannon is one of the co-authors of the statistics textbook Stat2: Building Models for a World of Data (W. H. Freeman, 2013). The second edition of this textbook was released under the title Stat2: Modeling with Regression and ANOVA (W.H. Freeman, 2019).

In 2019 she was elected as a Fellow of the American Statistical Association.
