= Jonathan Brand =

American college president

15th President of Cornell College
- Incumbent
- Assumed office July 1, 2011
- Preceded by: Les Garner

11th President of Doane University
- In office 2005–2011
- Preceded by: Fredric D. Brown
- Succeeded by: Jacque Carter

Personal details
- Children: 2
- Education: University of Wisconsin–Madison (BA); University of Michigan (MA); Cornell University (JD)

Jonathan Brand is an American legal scholar and academic administrator serving as the 15th President of Cornell College in Mount Vernon, Iowa. Brand previously served as president of Doane University in Crete, Nebraska.

== Education ==
Brand earned a Bachelor of Arts degree in history and French from the University of Wisconsin–Madison, Master of Arts in French literature from the University of Michigan, and Juris Doctor from Cornell Law School. As an undergraduate, Brand studied abroad at the Paris-Sorbonne University through a NYU Paris program.

== Career ==
Brand has taught courses on political science and constitutional law at Grinnell College, Doane University, and Nanjing University. He served as the 11th President of Doane University from 2005 to 2011. In 2011, Brand was selected as the next president of Cornell College. He took office on July 1, 2011.

== Personal life ==
Brand and his wife, Rachelle LaBarge, have two children.
