= Frank Jeremiah Armstrong =

Physician and first African-American graduate of Cornell

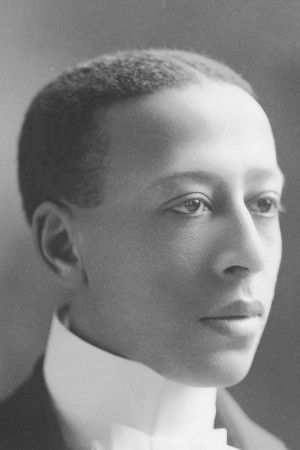
- Armstrong as photographed by Cornell College
- Born: April 15, 1877; Marion, Iowa, US
- Died: November 2, 1946 (aged 69); Chicago, Illinois, US
- Education: Cornell College (BA); College of Physicians and Surgeons of Chicago (MD)
- Occupations: Assistant; physician
- Known for: Being the first African American to graduate from Cornell College

Frank Jeremiah Armstrong (April 15, 1877 – November 2, 1946) was an American physician who was the first African-American graduate of Cornell College. He was the assistant of Booker T. Washington and later became a physician. He was murdered in his office in 1946, possibly by a burglar after a hospital's narcotics.

== Personal life and career ==
Armstrong graduated in 1900 from Cornell College as the first African American to do so. His nickname at Cornell was "Buck". He began playing baseball as a part of the Marion Ravens when he was 13 years old, and he played during the 1890s. Armstrong was a part of the college's Adelphian Literary Society and was a secretary of the society for one spring. In 1900, his final year in college, he was the captain of the baseball team. Booker T. Washington was announced as a speaker by Armstrong during the commencement ceremony, leading to Washington hiring Armstrong as his assistant. He received a medical degree from the College of Physicians and Surgeons in 1912 (which became the University of Illinois College of Medicine in 1913). Armstrong became a physician in Chicago. He was a part of the Chicago Medical Society, the American Medical Association, and the National Medical Association.

Armstrong married Jessie Marie Lucas in Chicago, on December 22, 1915. They had no children.

His college commencement address is in the 1905 book A Record of the Celebration of the Fiftieth Anniversary of the Founding of the College, published by Cornell College.

== Death ==
Armstrong was murdered in his office by gunshot on November 2, 1946, when he was 69 years old by a suspected burglar, but nothing was stolen. His body was found by a patient who called for help. He was survived by his wife Jessie Marie Armstrong and a $1,000 reward was offered by the police. It was later suspected that the murderer was part of a group after a narcotics safe at Providence hospital.

== Legacy ==
A student residential house and community center on the campus of Cornell College was named in his honor in 2010.
