= The Journal of American History =

- Discipline: American history
- Language: English
- Edited by: Benjamin Irvin

Publication details
- Former names: Proceedings of the Mississippi Valley Historical Association, The Mississippi Valley Historical Review
- History: 1914–present
- Publisher: Oxford University Press (on behalf of the Organization of American Historians) (United States)
- Frequency: Quarterly
- Impact factor: 1.2 (2024)

Standard abbreviations
- ISO 4: J. Am. Hist.

Indexing
- ISSN: 0021-8723 (print); 1936-0967 (web)
- LCCN: 41015235
- JSTOR: 00218723
- OCLC no.: 1754428

Links
- Journal homepage; Online access

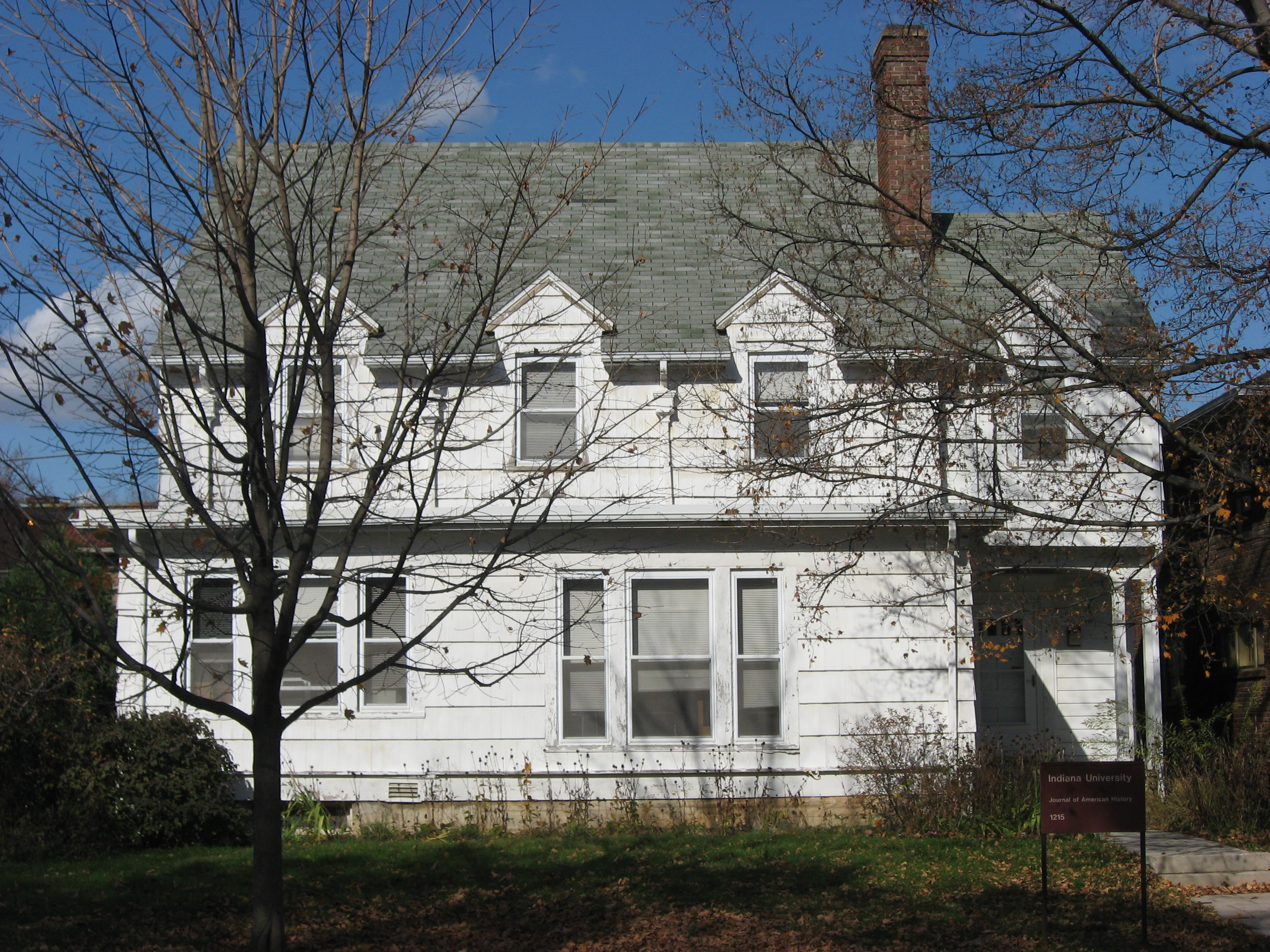
Journal offices in Bloomington

The Journal of American History is the quarterly official academic journal of the Organization of American Historians. It covers the field of American history and was established in 1914 as The Mississippi Valley Historical Review, the official journal of the Mississippi Valley Historical Association. After the publication of its fiftieth volume, the recognition of a shift in the direction of the membership and its scholarship led to the name change in 1964.

The journal is headquartered in Bloomington, Indiana, where it has close ties to the History Department at Indiana University.

== List of editors ==
=== Proceedings of the Mississippi Valley Historical Association ===
- Benjamin F. Shambaugh (1907–1914)

=== The Mississippi Valley Historical Review ===
- Clarence W. Alvord (1914–1923)
- Lester B. Shippee (1923–1924)
- Milo M. Quaife (1924–1930)
- Arthur Charles Cole (1930–1941)
- Louis Pelzer (1941–1946)
- Wendell H. Stephenson (1946–1953)
- William C. Binkley (1953–1963)
- Oscar O. Winther (1963–1964)

=== The Journal of American History ===
- Oscar O. Winther (1964–1966)
- Martin Ridge (1966–1978)
- Lewis Perry (1978–1984)
- Paul Lucas (1984–1985)
- David Thelen (1985–1999)
- Joanne Meyerowitz (1999–2004)
- David Nord (2004–2005)
- Edward T. Linenthal (2005–2016)
- Benjamin H. Irvin (2017—present)
