= Louis Pelzer =

Louis Pelzer (February 4, 1879 – June 28, 1946) was a professor of history at the University of Iowa and namesake of the Louis Pelzer Award, given annually by the Organization of American Historians for an essay in any period or topic in the history of the United States.

== Life and career ==
Pelzer was born in Griswold, Iowa, the son of Henry and Sophia Pelzer. He was a graduate of the Iowa State Teachers College in 1901, and received PhB (1901) and PhD (1909) from the University of Iowa. He joined the University of Iowa faculty in 1911, was appointed to associate professor in 1917, and full Professor in 1925. He was secretary of the Big Ten Conference in 1927–1929, a member of the Iowa Centennial Commission in 1938, and editor of the Mississippi Valley Historical Review from 1941 until his death.

In 1917 he married Mildred Lenore Weenink in Dillon, Montana. They had two sons, both of whom died in service during World War II.

== Publications ==
Among Pelzer's published works were:

- Pelzer, Louis (1907). Augustus Caesar Dodge: a study in American politics. Iowa City: University of Iowa PhD Thesis.
- Pelzer, Louis (1911). Henry Dodge. Iowa City: The State historical society of Iowa.
- Pelzer, Louis (1917). Marches of the dragoons in the Mississippi Valley: an account of marches and activities of the First regiment United States dragoons in the Mississippi Valley between the years 1833 and 1850. Iowa City: The State historical society of Iowa.
- Pelzer, Louis (1936). The cattlemen's frontier : a record of the trans-Mississippi cattle industry from oxen trains to pooling companies, 1850-1890. Glendale, CA: Arthur H. Clark Co. OCLC 2569715.
- Carleton, James Henry; Pelzer, Louis (1983). The prairie logbooks : dragoon campaigns to the Pawnee villages in 1844, and to the Rocky Mountains in 1845. Lincoln: University of Nebraska Press. OCLC 9154281.
