= Ralph O. Allen =

American chemist

Ralph O. Allen is a professor of chemistry and environmental sciences at the University of Virginia. He received his BA from Cornell College in 1965 and his Ph.D. in chemistry from the University of Wisconsin-Madison in 1970. He is a fellow of the Royal Norwegian Council for Scientific and Industrial Research (NTNF) and has been a Marshall Foundation Visiting Scholar in Norway.
