= Stone City Art Colony =

Coordinates: 42.11°N 91.35°W

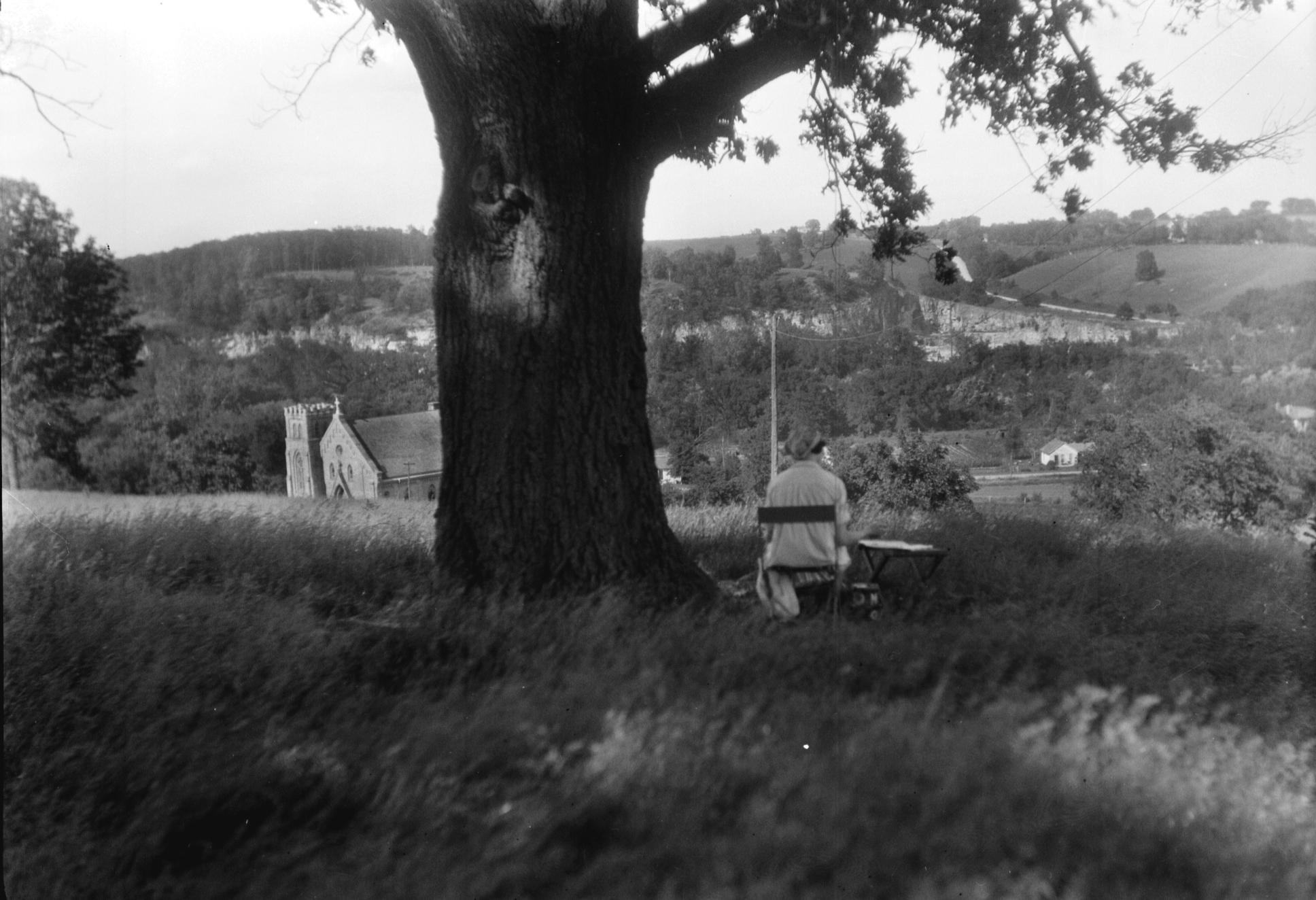
- An artist painting the scenery, 1932
- Genre: Basic and Advanced Composition, Outdoor Painting, Figure drawing, Lithography, Sculpture, and Picture Framing.
- Dates: Saturday, June 26, 1932 to Saturday, August 6, 1932; Tuesday, June 27, 1933 to Tuesday, August 22, 1933.
- Locations: John A. Green Estate, Stone City, Iowa
- Years active: Original colony held in 1932; again held in 1933.
- Founders: Edward Rowan, Adrian Dornbush, Grant Wood

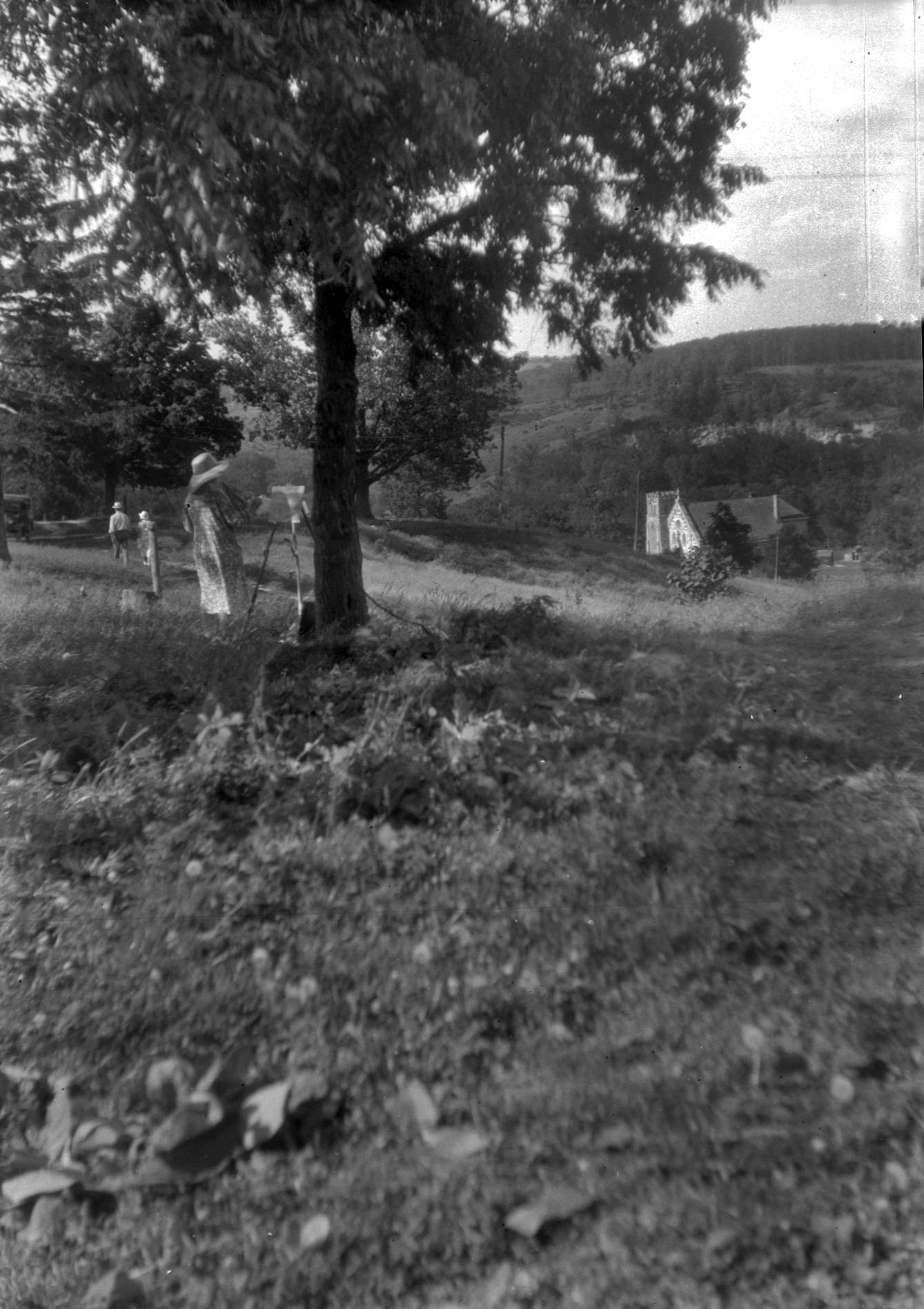
Artists of the Stone City Art Colony, 1932

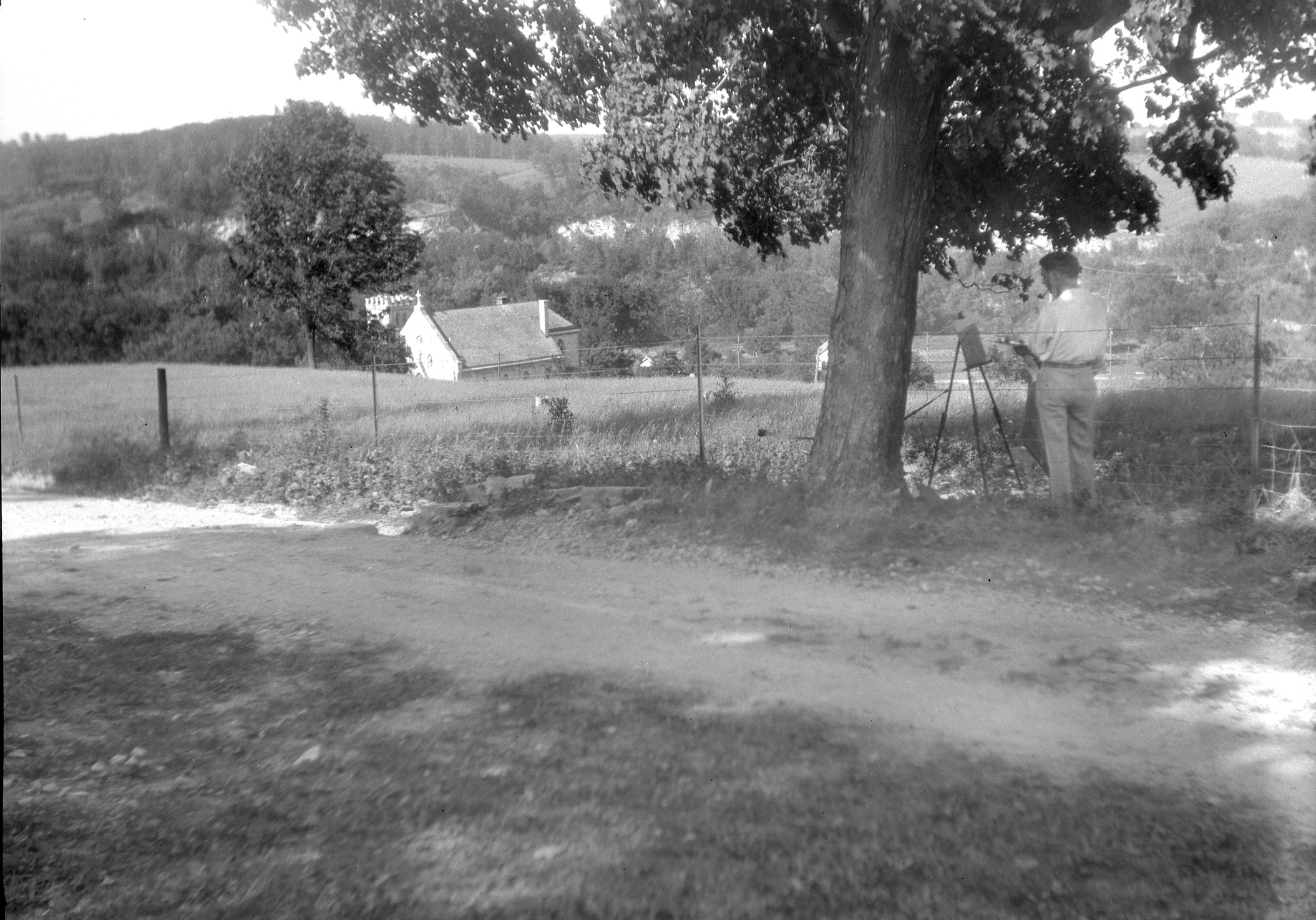
An artist at his easel, 1932

The Stone City Art Colony was an art colony founded by Edward Rowan, Adrian Dornbush, and Grant Wood. The colony gathered on the John A. Green Estate in Stone City, Iowa during the summers of 1932 and 1933.

== History ==
The colony was started by Edward Rowan, director of the Little Gallery in Cedar Rapids, Iowa, Adrian Dornbush, former director of the Flint Institute of Art and a Little Gallery art instructor, and famous local artist Grant Wood. Rowan was the primary facilitator of the creation of the colony. His commitment to the project led the Carnegie Foundation to invest $1000 in the colony's creation.

The Stone City Art Colony was meant as an alternative to more established artist colonies in Woodstock and Santa Fe, allowing artists located in the Midwest to have an easily accessible site for residency. Residents lived in ice house wagons that they decorated themselves. Wood later employed many of the artists at the colony in the Public Works of Art Project (later named Civil Works Administration) which he administered for the state of Iowa, producing a large number of Depression Era murals (thanks to the New Deal) that still decorate many post offices and public buildings in Iowa.

The art colony was always plagued by financial difficulties; 1933 was its final summer and it had already begun suffering financial hardships before opening for the year. When it did close that fall, its assets were sold off to pay its debts. Even though Wood and the other faculty taught there free of charge, the colony had never become financially self-sustaining.

== Notable faculty ==
- Adrian Dornbush, painting instructor and colony director
- Edward Rowan, lecturer and consultant for the colony
- Grant Wood, advanced painting instructor
- Arnold Pyle, framing designer and instructor
- David McCosh, painting and lithography instructor
- Francis Chapin, lithography
- Florence Sprague, sculpture instructor
- Marvin Cone, figure drawing instructor
- Jefferson Randolph Smith, "business manager." Husband of Florence Sprague and son of outlaw Soapy Smith

== Notable students ==
- Lee Allen (1910–2006)
- Isabel Bloom (1908–2001)
- John Bloom (1906-2002)
- Lela Powers Briggs (1896-1953)
- Marion Gilmore (1909-1984)
- Nan Wood Graham (1899–1990)
- Conger Metcalf (1914–1998)
- Marjorie Ann Nuhn (1898–1988)
- Daniel Rhodes (1911–1989)
- Persis Robertson (1896–1992)

== See also ==
- Museum of Art Cedar Rapids
- Stone City, Iowa, painting
