= Ruby Sia =

Chinese educator (1884–1955)

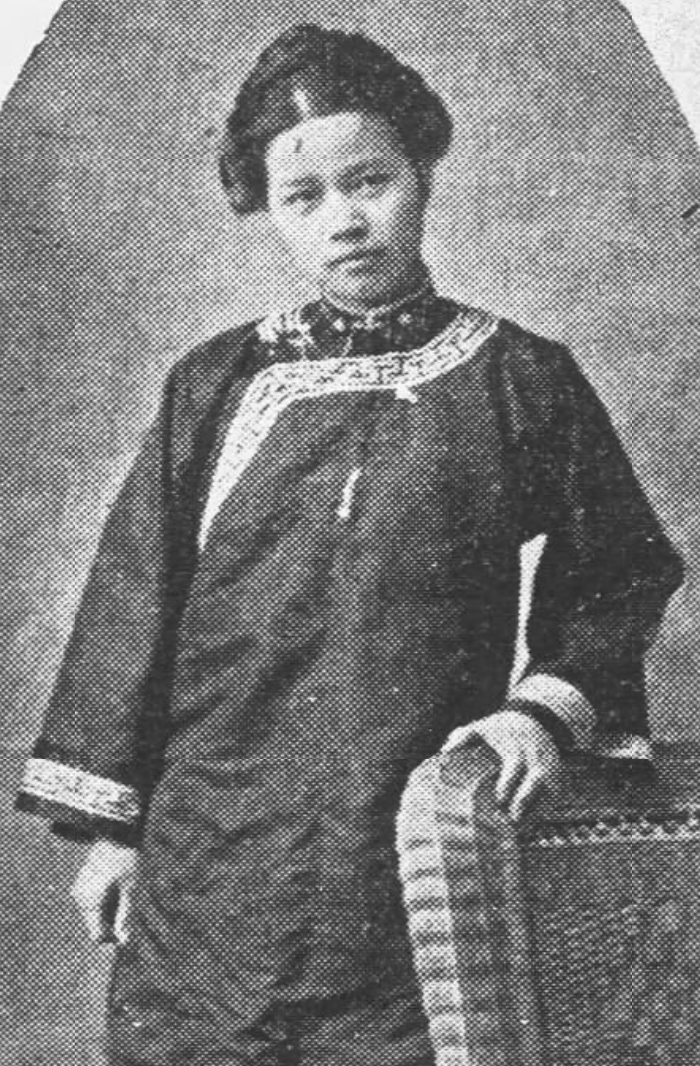
- Ruby Sia, from a 1907 publication
- Born: 1884; Foochow, China
- Died: 1955 (aged 70–71); Shanghai, China
- Occupations: Educator, Methodist missionary
- Known for: First Chinese graduate of Cornell College (1910)

Ruby F. Sia (1884 – 1955) was a Chinese educator. She was the first Chinese graduate of Cornell College in Iowa, United States, a member of the class of 1910.

== Early life and education ==
Sia was born in Foochow (Fuzhou), the daughter of Sia Heng-To, a Methodist minister and educator. Her uncle, Sia Sek Ong, was also a Methodist minister and educator. She first traveled to North America in 1900, and graduated from Methodist Church-affiliated Cornell College in 1910, and was the school's first Chinese graduate. Cornell awarded her an honorary master's degree in 1918, and an honorary doctorate in 1936. She took courses Baltimore Women's College in 1911 and 1912, and at Teachers' College, Columbia University during her visit to the United States in 1920 and 1921.

While in the United States, she was associate editor of The Chinese Students' Monthly. and a contributor to the World's Chinese Students' Journal. Her cousin Mabel Sia was also educated in Iowa.

== Career ==
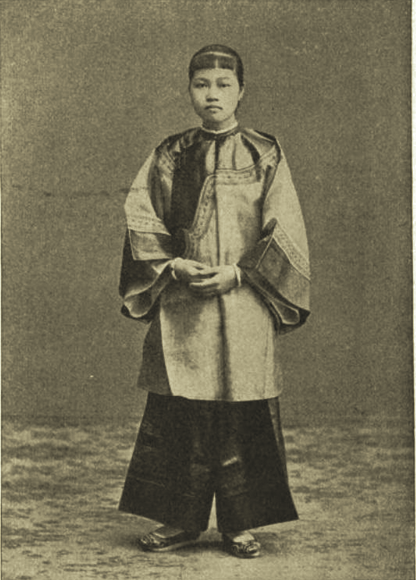
Ruby Sia as a teenaged girl in Fuzhou (from The Woman's Missionary Friend, 1898)

Sia traveled to China with American missionaries in 1904, and spoke at church events during her college years. On her return to China after college, Sia advocated for modernization in education, and especially for the education of girls, while recognizing traditional gendered expectations. For example, she promoted chemistry, nutrition and physiology courses, for women to manage domestic responsibilities more scientifically. She was a teacher and director of music at Hwa Nan College, a Methodist missionary women's college in Foochow. She was a founder of the Foochow Woman's Patriotic Society.

Sia returned to the United States from 1920 to 1921 as a conference delegate and lecturer. She toured in the United States in 1936, when she attended an international Methodist conference, gave lectures, and raised funds for her college. She made another lecture tour in the United States in 1940 and 1941.

== Publications ==
- "Education the Chief Factor in Chinese Enlightenment" (1907)
- "Chinese Women Educated Abroad" (1907)
- "China's Need of Industrial Education" (1910)

== Personal life ==
Sia died in 1955, in Shanghai, when she was about seventy years old.
