= Marvin Cone =

American painter (1891–1965)

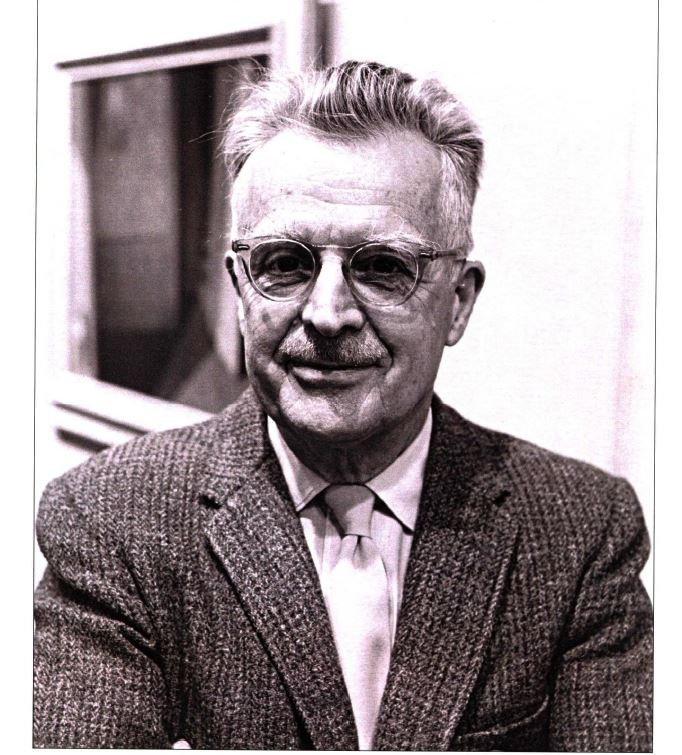
Marvin Cone in 1961

Marvin Dorwart Cone (October 21, 1891 – May 18, 1965) was an American painter in the regionalist style.

Cone was born in Cedar Rapids, Iowa, and lived there most of his life. He graduated from Washington High School in 1910. Cone attended college and traveled to Paris with his contemporary and high-school friend, Grant Wood. After his return to the United States, Cone helped to found the Stone City Art Colony. He was a professor at Coe College for more than forty years. Most of his paintings can now be seen at the Cedar Rapids Museum of Art. Some of his sketches can also been found in the permanent collection of the University of Northern Iowa Gallery of Art in Cedar Falls. "Untitled (Interior)," a painted scene of doors in an interior, can be seen at the Blanden Memorial Art Museum in Fort Dodge, Iowa.

In 1906 he began a lifelong friendship with Grant Wood. He graduated from Coe College in 1914 and then studied for several years at the School of the Art Institute of Chicago. He enlisted in the Iowa National's Guard's 34th Infantry Division in 1917, during which time he won a training camp design competition with a "Red Bull" insignia, which the now multi-state unit wears to this day. He left for France in 1917, where he served for several years as an interpreter.

In 1919, he studied for about five months at the Ecole des Beaux Arts in Montpellier, France. When he returned to Cedar Rapids that year, he continued to pursue his interest in art. He considered commercial art, but chose instead to accept a position teaching French at Coe College for the 1919–1920 academic year. Upon his return to Cedar Rapids, Cone quickly renewed his friendship with Grant Wood and resumed his active involvement with the local art association (now the Cedar Rapids Museum of Art). Cone and Wood went abroad in the summer of 1920, hoping to improve their technical skills. The visit proved influential, resulting in a stunning series of impressionistic views of picturesque cityscapes and landscapes, Paris streets and gardens, and the French countryside. Architecture and landscape fascinated Cone for the rest of his life. He returned to Paris with his wife Winnifred in 1929 and traveled to Mexico in 1939. Cone lived all his 74 years in Cedar Rapids, Iowa, where he married, raised a family, and for more than four decades taught art at Coe College. Although he never achieved great fame, he was highly respected by his contemporaries.

Marvin Cone sought to evoke his inner vision of nature rather than to create a realistic depiction of the rural landscape. To Cone, nature was a vehicle for revealing certain truths. His paintings integrated his firsthand observation of nature. He once said, "The purpose of art is not to reproduce life, but to present an editorial, a comment on life.... The artist does not set out to imitate nature. What would be the purpose of that? Let the camera with its clever mechanism imitate. Art, such as poetry, music, and painting, is simply a portion of the experience of the artist. When we actually see ideals, they become real to us. Art traces an abstraction and makes it audible or visual. It symbolizes the whole of life. We believe in something we can see.”
