= Marion Gilmore =

American painter

- Born: Marian Jordan Gilmore; May 7, 1909; Ottumwa, Iowa
- Died: June 10, 1984 (aged 75); Ottumwa, Iowa
- Other names: Marion Jordan Gilmore, Marion Gilmore Hulse, Mion Hulse
- Occupation: artist
- Years active: 1930s-1960s

Marion Gilmore also Marian Gilmore and Mion Hulse was an American muralist and painter from Iowa. She was also an accomplished cellist. In the 1930s, she won two federal commissions to complete post office murals for the Public Works Art Project of the Treasury Department. Her work is representative of the Ashcan School and Social Realism art movements of American art.

== Early life ==
Marian Jordan Gilmore was born on May 7, 1909, in Ottumwa, Iowa, to Ethel (née Jordan) and Merrill C. Gilmore. She grew up in Ottumwa, where her father was a prominent attorney. Gilmore was an accomplished cellist and throughout her life played in concerts and trios around Ottumwa, as well as playing in the Parsons College Symphony Orchestra and the Southeast Iowa Symphony Orchestra. She studied cello in Des Moines at Drake University and also later in New York. After completing high school, Gilmore attended the University of Kentucky in 1927, studying art under Carol Sax. She then studied at the School of Fine Arts and Crafts in Boston and the Rochester Athenaeum and Mechanics Institute. Gilmore moved to New York City and studied simultaneously at the Phoenix Art Institute under Franklin Booth and Norman Rockwell and at the Art Students League of New York. In 1932, she studied during the summer at the Stone City Art Colony under Grant Wood. In 1937, Gilmore studied at the American Academy of Art in Chicago and subsequently enrolled at the Art Institute of Chicago.

== Career ==
In 1938, Gilmore produced a work, featuring Chief Wapello, to commemorate Air-mail Week for the Ottumwa post office. The cachet was used on all mail sent from the Ottumwa post office during the 20th anniversary of the launch of air mail service in the U.S. In 1939, Gilmore was teaching art to children at the Ottumwa Community Art Center with Robert Hulse, whom she later married in 1943. She won the commission to produce a mural for the town of Corning, Iowa in 1939. The painting was featured in Life as part of an article on 48 murals to be produced for each of the contiguous U.S. States. Gilmore's mural featured a scene she had sketched at a band concert in Hedrick, Iowa. Though she won the competition for Band Concert with a cannon and an obelisk included in the sketch, residents of Corning complained that the design did not accurately reflect their town. Gilmore was forced to alter her mural to remove the cannon and obelisk, though she did add decorative landscaping, rather than the buildings which could actually be seen behind the bandstand.

In 1941, Gilmore won the competition to complete the post office mural in Corydon, Iowa. The mural, Volunteer Fire Department, was completed in 1942 and features a 1928 Continental fire engine, which was the truck used by the town's fire department. While the original mural remains in the post office, a replica of the mural and the original truck are part of an exhibit found in the Prairie Trails Museum of Wayne County.

After her marriage, Gilmore began using the professional gender-neutral name Mion Hulse. In 1943, her husband, Robert, worked on an exhibit at the Minneapolis Institute of Arts and the following year was hired as an instructor at the University of Minnesota in Minneapolis. The couple lived there before moving to Long Island, New York, in 1952. Gilmore worked in painting, sculpting, illustration, and design. Her paintings fall into the Ashcan and Social Realism schools and often depict their images in a humorous way. Her work was widely exhibited and included in collections and galleries. Some of the best representations of her work include "Children in Washington Park", "Fischer's Tavern", "Ham & Eggs - 45¢" and "Yard Sale", all of which were included in a posthumous exhibit hosted by the Seiderman Gallery in Lynbrook, New York, in 1995.

Gilmore died on June 10, 1984, in Ottumwa.
