= Lee Allen (artist) =

American painter, muralist, and medical illustrator

Lee Allen (1910 – May 5, 2006), born Edwin Lee Allen, was an American Regionalist painter, a muralist, and a medical illustrator, and an acclaimed ophthalmic photographer and ocularist.

== Early years ==
Lee Allen was born in Muscatine, Iowa, then moved to Des Moines, where he graduated from East High School in 1928. He studied briefly with Iowa artist Charles Atherton Cumming at the Cumming School of Art, housed then on the upper floor of the Des Moines Public Library. In 1880, Cumming had launched the art department at Cornell College (Mount Vernon, Iowa) and, in 1909, had become the founding head of the art department at the University of Iowa (Iowa City), a position he continued to hold while also teaching in Des Moines. Encouraged by Cumming most likely, Allen enrolled in the School of Art at the University of Iowa in 1929. In 1932 and 1933 Allen was a student at the Stone City Art Colony and studied under Grant Wood.

== Murals ==
Iowa artist Grant Wood became internationally known in 1930, with the completion of his painting called American Gothic, and in 1934, he was invited to join the faculty at the University of Iowa. Wood also served as the Iowa director for the Public Works of Art Project, in connection with which he called on Allen to assist him with various projects. Afterwards, in 1935, Allen went to Mexico, where he studied mural painting with Diego Rivera, to whom he had been introduced by Grant Wood. When he returned to Iowa, he received two additional government commissions from the Section of Fine Arts of the U.S. Treasury Department to make indoor murals for new post offices in two small Iowa communities. In 1938, Allen created a mural titled “Soil Erosion and Control” for the post office in Onawa, Iowa. In 1940, he produced a second mural called “Conservation of Wild Life” for the post office in Emmetsburg, Iowa.

== Medical illustration ==
In 1937, while looking for full-time employment, Allen accepted an appointment at the College of Medicine at the University of Iowa as a medical illustrator. He remained in that position for 39 years, during which he also published various scholarly papers about medical illustration as applied to ophthalmology. Lee retired from the U of I in 1976 with the rank of Emeritus, after which he and David Bulgarelli opened a private ocularist practice, Iowa Eye Prosthetics, Inc., in Coralville, Iowa, continuing the ocularist apprenticeship program.

== Later life and macular degeneration ==
During his life, Lee Allen served as president of the Association of Medical Illustrators, he was one of ten founding members and the first president of the Ophthalmic Photographers' Society 1969, and he also served as president of the American Society of Ocularists.

Around 1988, while in retirement, Allen began to experience symptoms of macular degeneration, an incurable dysfunction that had resulted in functional blindness for millions of senior citizens. In response, he made a series of diary-like drawings of the progression of his illness and its treatment with laser surgery.

In 2000, at age 90, he produced a book about his twelve-year introspective watch of macular degeneration, titled The Hole in My Vision: An Artist’s View of His Own Macular Degeneration. The book contains his drawings of the changes in his vision, his annotations, with other observations by his medical colleagues and physicians.

He died in Iowa City in 2006 at age 95.

== See also ==
- WPA
- Grant Wood
- Ocularist
