= R. Lee Allen =

American politician (1927–2017)

Member of the Utah House of Representatives from the 1st district
- In office 1983–1992

Personal details
- Born: Robert Lee Allen; May 22, 1927 Ogden, Utah, U.S.
- Died: November 8, 2017 (aged 90)
- Party: Republican
- Spouse: Jane Bernice Petersen Allen (m.1949–2011; her death)
- Profession: Real estate broker, farmer, rancher

Robert Lee Allen (May 22, 1927 – November 8, 2017) was an American politician who was a Republican member of the Utah State Senate. He was a farmer, rancher and real estate broker. Allen was also commissioner of Box Elder County, Utah from 1993 to 2000. Allen died on November 8, 2017, at the age of 90.
