= Cedar Rapids Independent Film Festival =

Coordinates: 42°1′44.71″N 91°37′24.01″W

The Cedar Rapids Independent Film Festival was founded in Cedar Rapids, Iowa in 2001 to provide a venue for Iowa-connected filmmakers to screen their work for peers and general audiences. The organization's primary goals are to encourage independent filmmakers with Iowa ties to continue improving their craft, to provide a place to specifically showcase Iowa-connected films, present a unique cultural event to the community, and to offer networking opportunities for the purpose of strengthening Iowa connections in the film industry everywhere. It is held the first full non-Easter weekend in April, at the Collins Road Theatres in Marion, Iowa, a town adjacent to Cedar Rapids.

The Cedar Rapids Independent Film Festival is open to independent filmmakers who wish to showcase their productions and network with others. Festival screenings are open to the public. In addition to screenings and awards, the festival also includes seminars, guest speakers and other activities for filmmakers and attendees.

This festival is open to all genres and there is no date-of-completion stipulation. Films are accepted from around the world. Unique to this event, all films must meet the criteria of having an Iowa Connection. A big part of CRIFF's mission is recognizing that people with ties to Iowa exist in the production industry all over the world. Entered films come from anywhere and by anyone, with an Iowa connection of some sort. That could be a crew or cast member who lived, worked or went to school in Iowa; a film that was produced, at least in part, in Iowa; or a story featuring an Iowa subject or Iowan (past or present, real or fictional).

Filmmakers Scott Beck and Bryan Woods (A Quiet Place, Haunt, 65) screened works at CRIFF multiple times early in their careers.

The Cedar Rapids Independent Film Festival has frequently screened works from mystery writer and director Max Allan Collins.

Producers from the movie The Final Season have appeared at the Festival twice. The movie's trailer premiered at the 2006 event.
