= Cornell College =

Liberal arts college in Mount Vernon, Iowa, US

Coordinates: 41°55′34″N 91°25′33″W

- Former name: Iowa Conference Seminary (1853–1877)
- Motto: Deus et Humanitas
- Motto in English: God and Humanity
- Type: Private liberal arts college
- Established: 1853; 173 years ago
- Religious affiliation: United Methodist Church
- Endowment: $108.2 million (2025)
- President: Jonathan Brand
- Academic staff: 119
- Undergraduates: 1,033
- Location: Mount Vernon, Iowa, United States
- Campus: Rural, 129 acres (52 ha)
- Colors: Purple & White
- Nickname: Rams
- Sporting affiliations: NCAA Division III – Midwest Conference
- Website: cornellcollege.edu
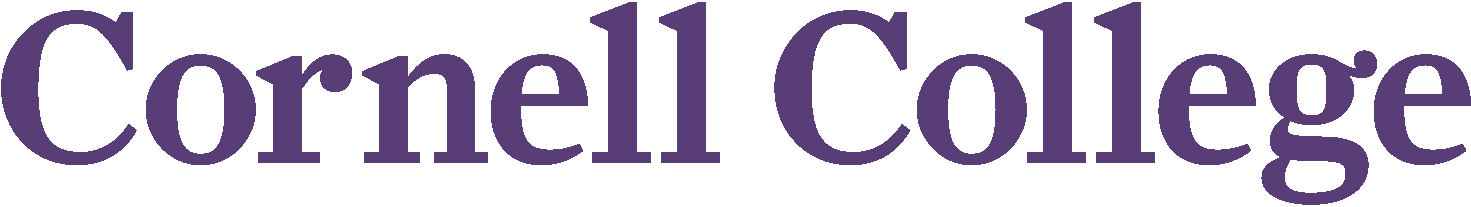

Cornell College is a private liberal arts college in Mount Vernon, Iowa, United States. Originally the Iowa Conference Seminary (Methodist), the school was founded in 1853 by George Bryant Bowman. Four years later, in 1857, the name was changed to Cornell College, in honor of iron tycoon William Wesley Cornell.

== Academics ==
Cornell students study one course at a time (commonly referred to as "the block plan" or "OCAAT"). Since 1978, school years have been divided into "blocks" of three and a half weeks each (usually followed by a four-day "block break" to round out to four weeks), during which students are enrolled in a single class; what would normally be covered in a full semester's worth of class at a typical university is covered in just eighteen class days. While schedules vary from class to class, most courses consist of around 30 hours of lecture, along with additional time spent in the laboratory, studying audio-visual media, or other activities. Cornell formerly operated on a calendar of 9 blocks per year but switched to 8 blocks per year beginning in the fall of 2012.

Since its inception, Cornell has accepted women into all degree programs. In 1858, Cornell was host to Iowa's first female recipient of a baccalaureate degree, Mary Fellows, a member of the first graduating class from Cornell College. She received a bachelor's degree in mathematics. In 1871, Harriette J. Cooke became the first female college professor in the United States to become a full professor with a salary equal to that of her male colleagues.

In November 2025, Cornell announced it would cut multiple programs in music, including several instrumental ensembles, and foreign language.

== Campus buildings ==
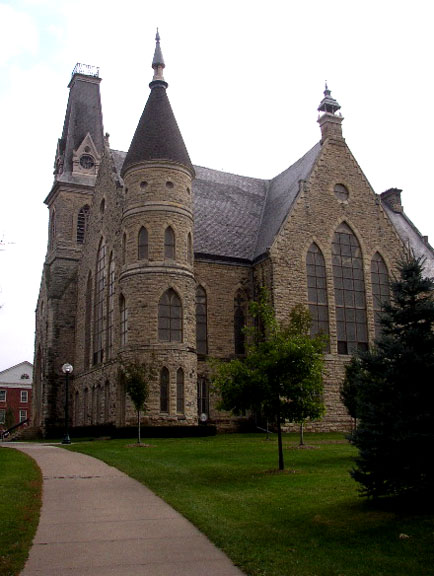
King Chapel housed a pipe organ of over 3000 pipes

Among the most widely recognizable buildings on Cornell's campus is King Chapel. The chapel is the site of the annual convocation at the commencement of the school year as well as the baccalaureate service in the spring for graduating students. The chapel contained a large organ (over 3000 pipes) and was often the site of musical performances. Religious services are held in the nearby Allee Chapel.

Old Sem, for a short while, was the second building of the original college and now houses administrative offices of the college.

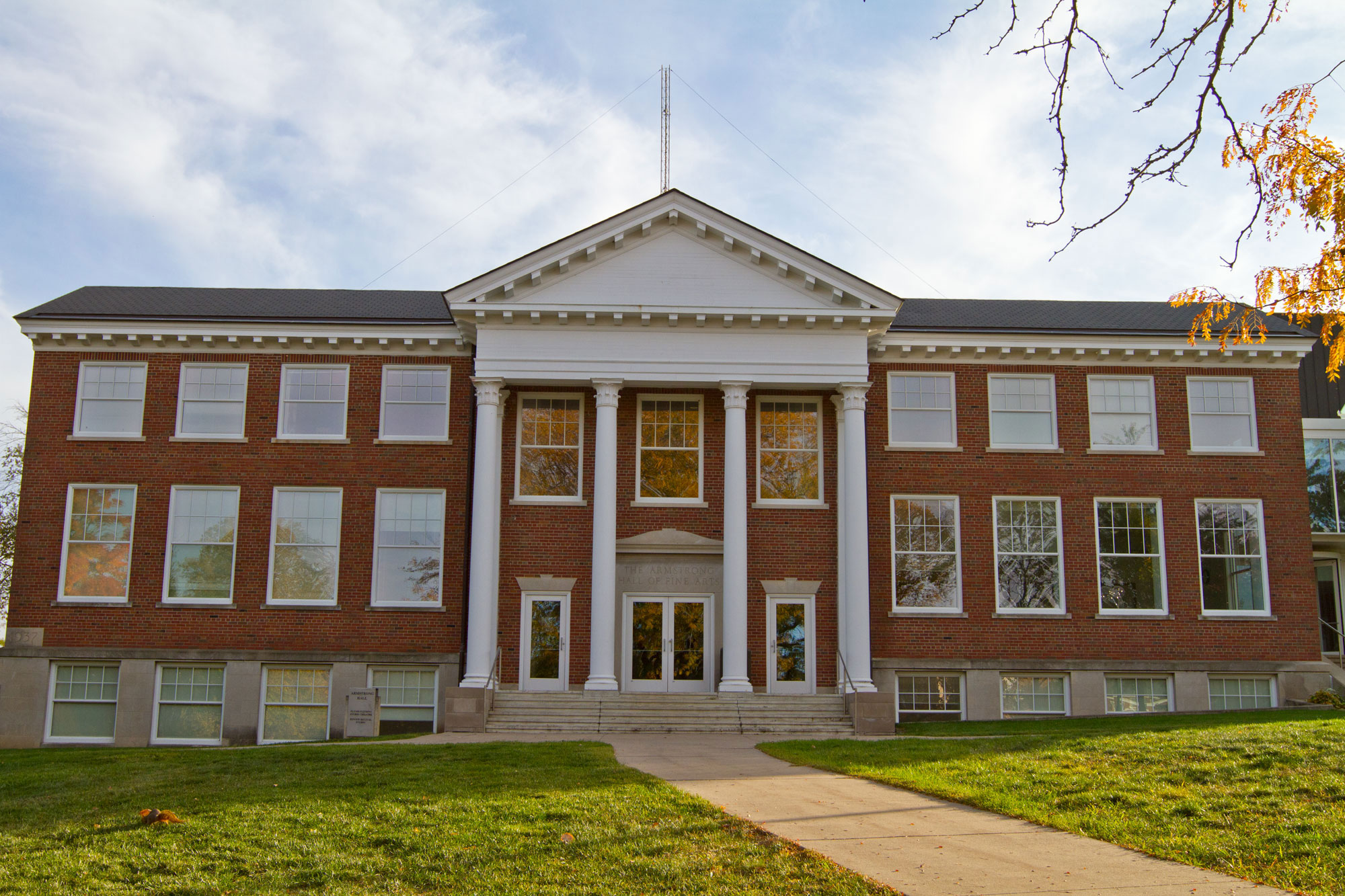
Armstrong Hall houses the college music department

Cornell contains 9 academic buildings. College Hall (also sometimes called "Old Main"), the oldest building on campus, houses classrooms and offices of several social science and humanities departments. South Hall, originally a male dormitory, houses the Politics and Creative Writing Departments. Prall House contains offices and classrooms of the Philosophy and Religion Departments. The Merle West Science Center houses the Physics, Engineering, Mathematics, Statistics, and Computer Science Departments. West Science contains one of the school's two stadium seating lecture-style classrooms, with a capacity around 100. These have since been relocated to the new science building, Russell Science Center. It opened for classes for the 2019–2020 academic year. The Norton Geology Center contains both an extensive museum and classrooms for geological sciences. Law Hall includes the Math, Computer Science, and Psychology Departments, and is the computing hub of the campus. McWethy Hall, formerly a gymnasium, was remodeled and now contains the studios and offices of the Art Department. Armstrong Hall and Youngker Hall are adjoining fine arts buildings. Armstrong Hall is the location of the Music Department, while Youngker Hall contains the Theatre Department, including Kimmel Theatre. In addition, the Small Sports Center and the Lytle House contain classrooms of the Kinesiology Department.

Cole Library serves both the college and the Mount Vernon community.

Cornell has several residence halls. Pfeiffer Hall, Tarr Hall, and Dows Hall together form the "Tri-Hall" area. Tarr was once an all-male residence hall, but now is co-educational. Likewise, Dows, once an all-female residence hall, joins Pfeiffer and Tarr in providing co-ed housing. Tarr and Dows are both primarily freshmen dorms, while Pfeiffer houses upperclassmen as well as first-years. Pfeiffer was extensively renovated in 2008 and is co-ed by room. Bowman–Carter Hall is an all-female hall for upperclassmen, situated in a former hospital building. Pauley–Rorem Hall (commonly referred to as PR) is a combination of two residence halls that are joined in the middle by a common set of stairs. Female first-years resided in Pauley, and male first-years resided in Rorem until 2012–2013 when both residence halls became co-ed by floor. Pauley Hall was once home to the Pauley Academic Program, a community of male and female students with strong academic backgrounds. Pauley Hall was co-ed by floor as early as 1986, and in 1987–1989, the second floor Pauley was home to the Academic Program and was co-ed by room. Olin and Merner Hall are co-ed upper-class residence halls. New and Russell Hall (the latter commonly known as Clock Tower) were opened in 2005 and 2007, respectively, and provide suite-style living. Students may choose more independent living options in apartments at Wilch Apartments, 10th Avenue, Armstrong House, and Harlan House, and even at the Sleep Inn. Nearly all Cornell students are required to live on-campus or in campus apartments, so most students do not rent non-college housing.

The Cornell campus is centered on a modest hill, the feature noted in the moniker "Hilltop Campus." Several campus buildings are grouped on the hilltop, while the athletic facilities and some residential buildings are located farther downhill on the campus's northwest side.

== Greek life ==
From 1853–1927 over twenty literary societies and secret societies emerged as the backbone of social life at Cornell. In 1927, these groups voluntarily disbanded, and in 1929, faculty voted to allow groups to organize as Greek organizations, provided that they renounced all ties to national Greek organization. Cornell College has 11 recognized local fraternities and sororities.

== Athletics ==
Cornell athletics monogram

Cornell College fields 19 intercollegiate athletic teams, all of which compete in NCAA Division III sports. Formerly a member of the Iowa Intercollegiate Athletic Conference (IIAC), Cornell rejoined the Midwest Conference (MWC) in the fall of 2012. The Cornell men’s and women’s polo team has the most National titles of any sport at the University. They have won 12 USPA Division 1 Championships in: 1937, 1955, 1956, 1958, 1959, 1961, 1962, 1963, 1966, 1992, 2005 and 2024. In 2026 both teams advanced to Nationals but did not win. Cornell has achieved its greatest success in wrestling. Cornell wrestlers have won eight individual national titles, and in 1947, the wrestling team won the NCAA Division I and AAU national championships. Sixty-two Cornell wrestlers have been named NCAA All-Americans, and seven have been elected to the National Wrestling Hall of Fame. Seven wrestlers have also competed at the Olympics.

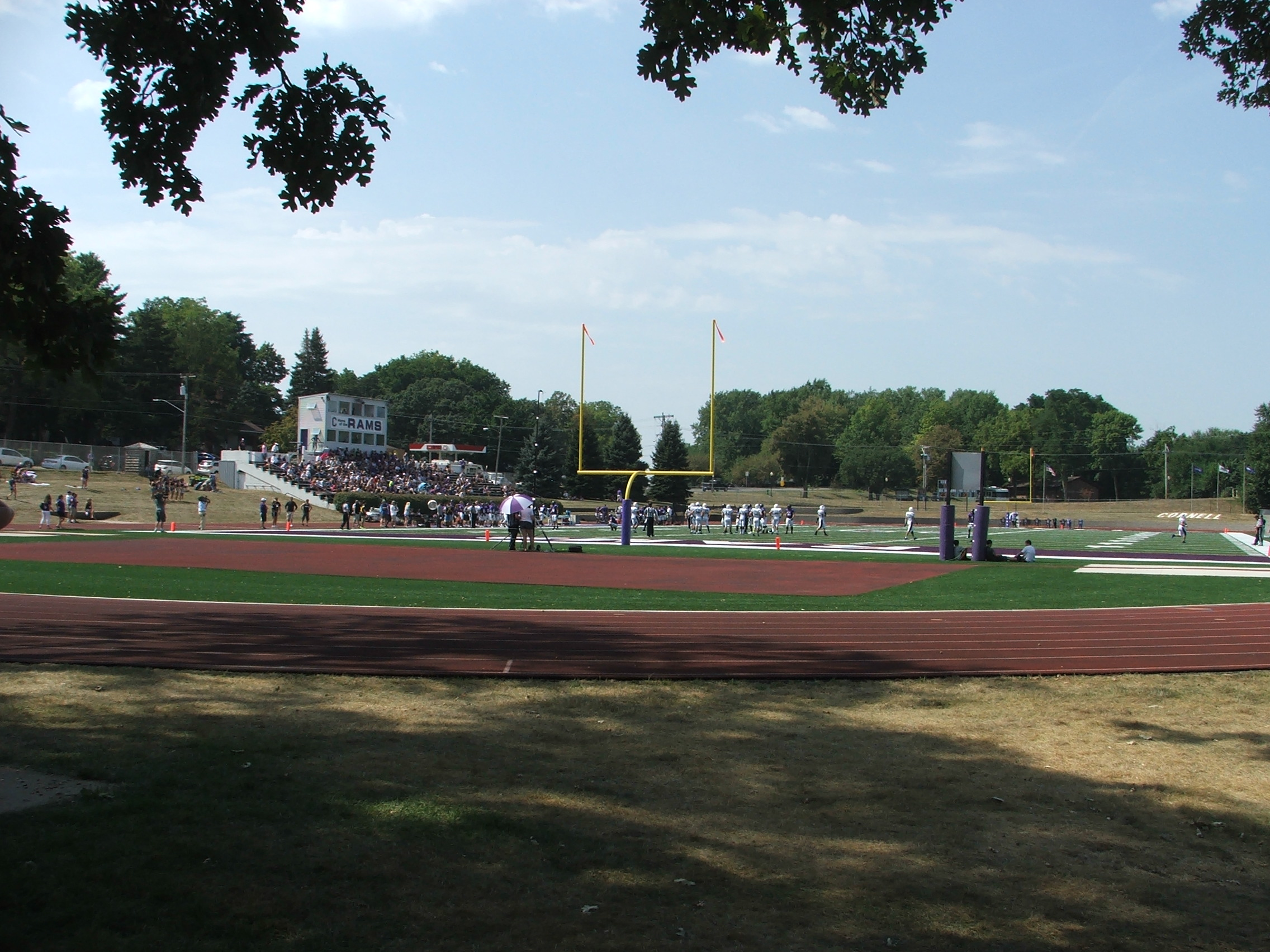
Ash Park, Cornell College football stadium

In 2011, the women's volleyball team captured the IIAC title and went on to take part in the national tournament for the first time in school history. Since then, the women's volleyball team has moved to the Midwest Conference (MWC) and won the MWC title seven times consecutively—six of those seven years making it to the national tournament.

Twenty-five Cornell students have earned NCAA Postgraduate Scholarships, awarded annually to students in their final year of eligibility who excel both athletically and academically. Cornell ranks in the top 15 Division III colleges in recipients of this award.

Cornell's football rivalry with Coe College dates to 1891, making it the oldest intercollegiate rivalry west of the Mississippi. Coe currently holds the lead in the series, 60-51-4.

Cornell's mascot is a ram. In 1949, the Royal Purple, the school's yearbook, offered a $5 prize for whomever could come up with a new mascot to replace either the "Purples" or "Hilltoppers." A sophomore proposed the idea for the ram.

== Notable alumni ==
- Ralph O. Allen (1965) – professor of chemistry at the University of Virginia
- Frank Jeremiah Armstrong (1900) – first African American graduate of the college
- Rob Ash (1973) – head football coach at Montana State University
- Henrietta Ash Bancroft (1886) – professor of English and dean of women at Albion College (1892–1898)
- Leo Beranek (1936) – co-founder of Bolt, Beranek and Newman
- Chris Carney (1981) – U.S. congressman from Pennsylvania's 10th Congressional district
- Robert Cousins (1881) – U.S. congressman from Iowa (1893–1909)
- Emma Amelia Cranmer (late 19th century) – temperance reformer, woman suffragist, writer
- James Daly (1941) – Emmy Award-winning actor
- John Mark Dean (1958) – conservationist and marine biologist
- Lester J. Dickinson (1898) – U.S. congressman (1919–1931) and Senator from Iowa (1931–1937)
- Lee Alvin DuBridge (1922) – President of the California Institute of Technology, science advisor to U.S. President Richard Nixon
- Don E. Fehrenbacher (1948) – Pulitzer Prize for History winner
- Michael J. Graham (1975) – former President of Xavier University
- Orin D. Haugen (1925) – Colonel in the United States Army during World War II
- David Hilmers (1972) – NASA astronaut and medical doctor
- Duane Garrison Hunt (1907) – Roman Catholic Bishop of Salt Lake City from 1937 until his death in 1960
- Rupert Kinnard (1979) – cartoonist, known for creating the first ongoing gay/lesbian African-American comic characters
- Franklin Littell (1937) – Holocaust scholar
- Elinor Levin (late 2000s) – member of the Iowa House of Representatives
- Maryann Mahaffey (1946) – Detroit City Council member
- Erwin Kempton Mapes (1909) – renowned scholar of Spanish-American Literature
- William Wallace McCredie (1885) – Judge, U.S. congressman from Washington (1909–1911) and Baseball Executive
- Deb Mell (1990) – member of Illinois House of Representatives
- Jack Norris (1989) – President and co-founder of Vegan Outreach
- Grimes Poznikov (1969) – street performer in San Francisco, California
- Harper Reed (2001) – CTO of Obama for America 2012 campaign
- Leslie M. Shaw (1874) – Governor of Iowa, U.S. Secretary of Treasury
- Ruby Sia (1910) – first Chinese graduate of Cornell College; missionary educator in Fuzhou
- Burton E. Sweet (1895) – U.S. Congressman from Iowa (1915–1923) and unsuccessful Senate Candidate (1922, 1924)
- Dale O. Thomas (1948) – wrestler and coach
- Walter Thornton (1899) – Major League Baseball player
- John Q. Tufts (late 19th century) – Congressman from Iowa's 2nd Congressional district (1875–1877)
- Hubert Stanley Wall (1924) – mathematician
- Elizabeth Wilson – member of the Iowa House of Representatives
- Thomas Zinkula (1979) – Roman Catholic Bishop of Diocese of Davenport (Iowa)
- Charlie Thurston (2008) - actor and playwright

== Notable faculty ==
- Joseph M. Bachelor – author
- Ann R. Cannon – fellow of the American Statistical Association, Assistant Chief Reader for the AP Statistics exam
- Glenn Cunningham – silver medalist 1500 meters run, 1936 Olympics
- Robert Dana – Poet Laureate of Iowa
- Charles Wesley Flint, President (1915–1922) – Methodist bishop
- Bruce Frohnen – academic
- Leroy Lamis – American sculptor
- Jim Leach – former Republican congressman, taught as a visiting professor
- Dave Loebsack – Congressman from Iowa's 2nd District
- William Harmon Norton – geologist, also alumnus
- Charles L. Phillips – professor of military science and tactics

== Notable staff ==
- Lisa Stone – Head Coach, Saint Louis University Women's Basketball

== Notes ==
1. ^{1} ^{endowment} As of June 30, 2013. p. 44. "Return of Organization Exempt From Income Tax" (PDF). Archived from the original (PDF) on April 19, 2014.
2. ^{2} ^{enrollment} "Cornell College: "Second Year of Record Enrollment"". Cornell College. 14 September 2011.
