= Stone City, Iowa =

- Census-designated place
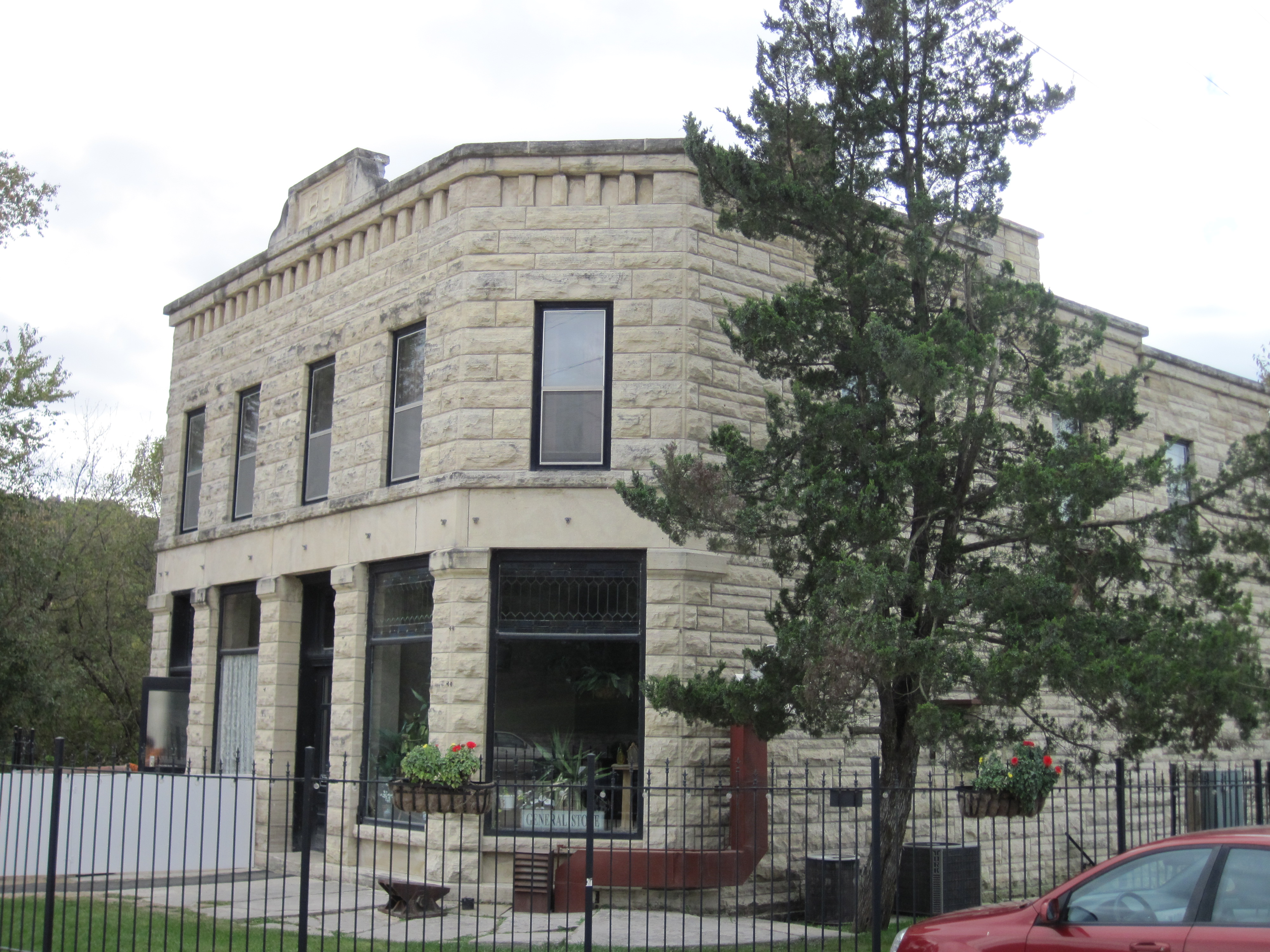
- General store, Stone City

- Location within Iowa Location within the United States
- Coordinates: 42°06′32″N 91°18′49″W
- Country: United States
- State: Iowa
- County: Jones

Area
  - Total: 1.81 sq mi (4.70 km^{2})
  - Land: 1.76 sq mi (4.55 km^{2})
  - Water: 0.058 sq mi (0.15 km^{2})
- Elevation: 820 ft (250 m)

Population (2020)
  - Total: 186
  - Density: 105.8/sq mi (40.85/km^{2})
- Time zone: UTC-6 (Central (CST))
  - Summer (DST): UTC-5 (CDT)
- ZIP code: 52205
- Area code: 319
- FIPS code: 19-75540

Stone City is an unincorporated community and census-designated place (CDP) in Jones County, Iowa, United States. Stone City began as a company town for the workers of the local quarries. Stone City is known for its Anamosa Limestone quarries, historic limestone architecture, and 1930s art colony. Its population was 186 persons in the 2020 census.

== History ==
=== 1850–1904 ===
Stone City was founded in 1850 along the banks of the Wapsipinicon River. Early settlers discovered dolomite and limestone at the location. In its earliest history Stone City was known as the Anamosa Quarries. Later the area became known as the Stone City Quarries. In the late 1800s, Henry Dearborn, John Green, and John Ronen each opened limestone quarries in the area. As the railroad system expanded westward, distribution of limestone to bordering states increased. Stone City limestone became the primary building material for railroad bridges, bridge piers, and foundations for major buildings. Each year from 1859 to 1895, more than 150,000 railroad car shipments of limestone were sent from Stone City.

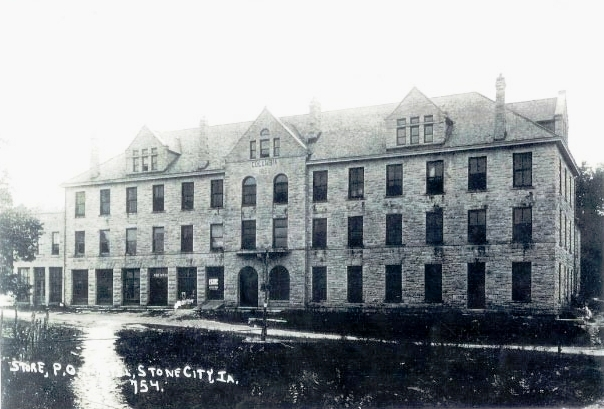
Columbia Hall

As the quarry business flourished, a city of stone emerged as hundreds of people settled in the area. First came a three-story, hotel and opera house complex known as Columbia Hall. It was completed in 1883 and made of 500,000 tons of stone. The theater offered some of the most well-known entertainers of the day. By 1880 the population of Stone City reached five hundred. Overlooking the town, Green built his twelve-room mansion containing seven Italian marble fireplaces, hand-painted murals, two baths, and a conservatory. Once the house was complete, Green erected more of the city – a railway station, a post office, schoolhouse, a blacksmith shop, water tower, and several houses, all made of stone.

=== 1905–1950 ===
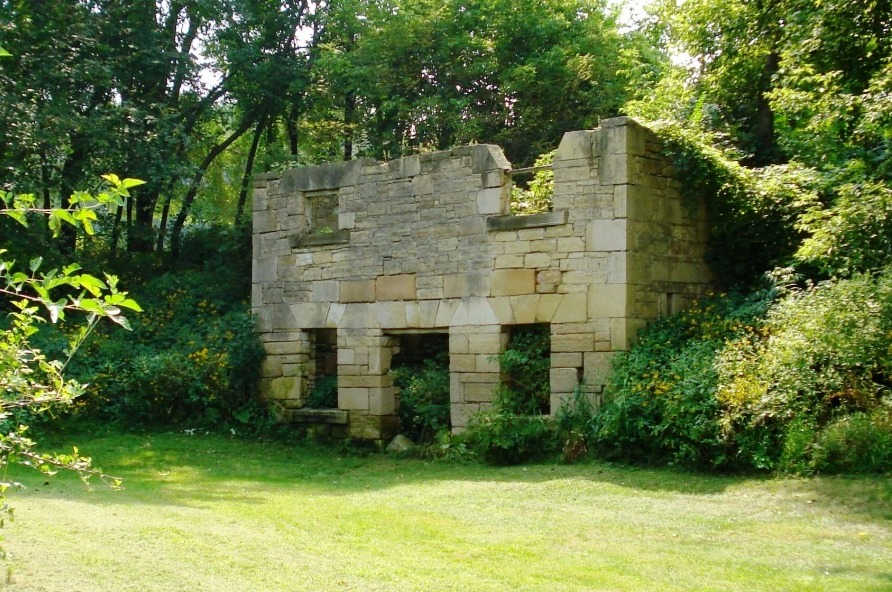
Stone City ruins

In 1905 Portland cement began to be produced in Waterloo, Iowa. The use of Portland cement in place of quarried stone had an adverse effect on the economy of the Stone City and one by one the quarries began to shut down. During the next half century, nature reclaimed most of the quarries. Columbia Hall was purchased in the 1930s and torn down in 1938 to use the stone elsewhere. In 1963 the Green Mansion was tragically damaged by fire and torn down in the 1990s.

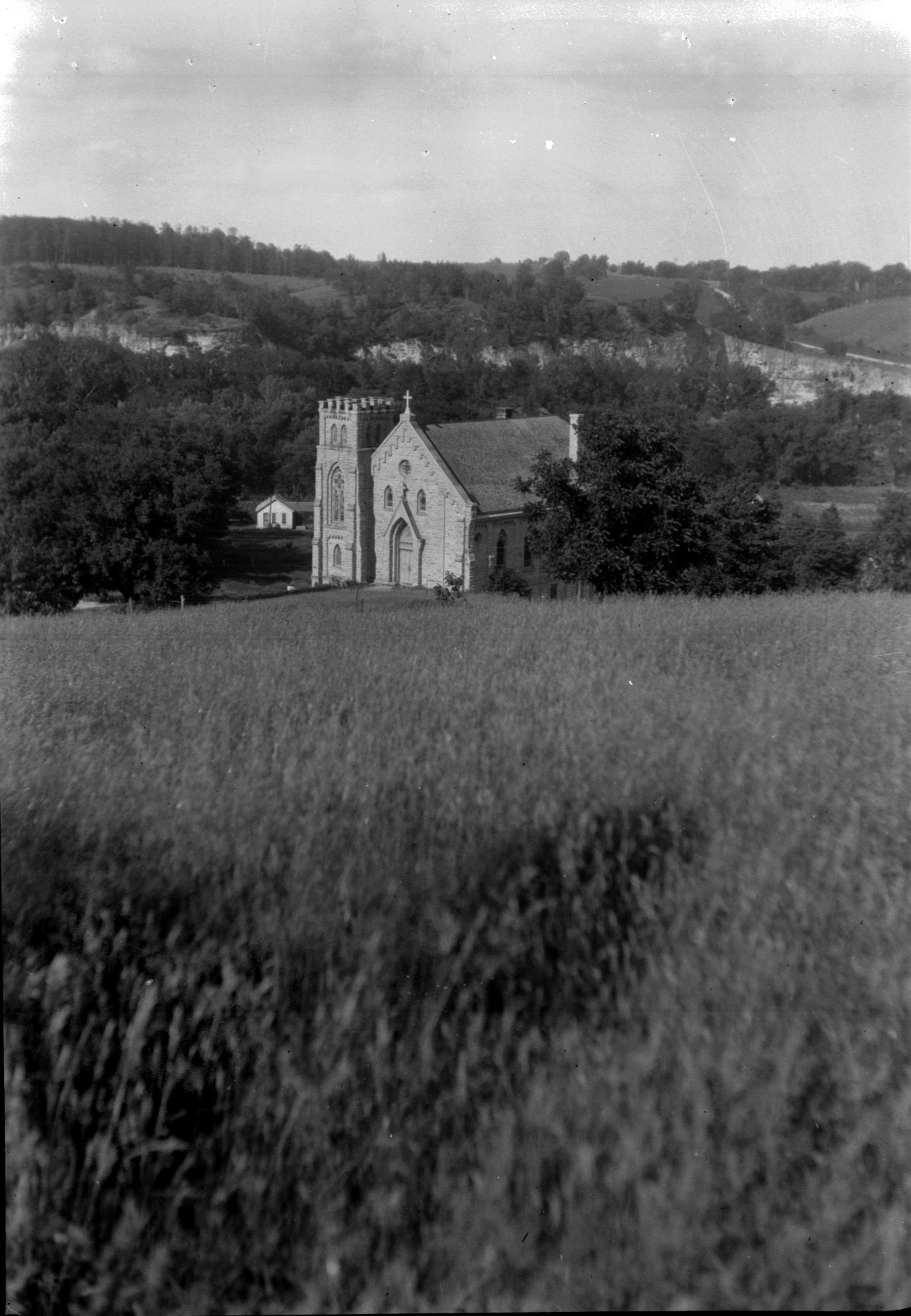
St. Joseph's Catholic Church, taken during the 1932 Stone City Art Colony gathering

Stone City was once the location of an art colony. In 1932, Grant Wood, Edward Rowan, and Adrian Dornbush established Stone City Art Colony. With little more than $100 and a number of promissory notes based on the success of the art colony they leased 10 acres (40,000 m^{2}) of land on the Green Estate. An area of 200 acres (0.81 km^{2}) of the estate had been purchased by Frank Nissen in 1920. The parcel of leased land included the Green Mansion, the Ice House and Water Tower. The upstairs portion of the house was converted into a dormitory. The rest of the house was used for business offices, kitchen, a sculpture studio and showers for the men. The basement of the ice house was made into a bar called The Sickle and Sheaf where instructor/student Dennis Burlingame tended bar. The upper portion of the water tower was converted into an apartment where Adrian Dornbush lived. It was called Adrian’s Tomb. The art colony failed. In terms of attendance and reputation the colony was a huge success. However, it was never a financial success.

=== 1950–present ===
Thanks to the vision of George Nissen (the developer of the modern trampoline) the original three-story Stone Barn, the Quarry Office, Water Tower and Ice House were preserved although they have been converted into private homes. The preservation of these structures, along with St. Joseph's Catholic Church, Schoolhouse, General Store, Dearborn Residence, Blacksmith Shop and several other private homes has helped revitalize the town with new families without losing the charm of old Stone City. Many of the remaining buildings have been listed on the National Register of Historic Places.

In 1952 the quarries underwent an economic revival under a new owner. The Stone City quarries have continued to grow and have become one of the largest quarries in the Midwest. The "Stone City quarries" now ship stone all over the United States. The stone from the banks of the Wapsipinicon River can be seen in both old and new construction, not just in Iowa, but across the United States. One of the most recent uses of this limestone can be seen in the new Disney Concert Hall in Los Angeles.

== Geography ==
Stone City is located at 42°06′20″N 91°21′01″W (42.105427, -91.350196).

According to the United States Census Bureau, the community has a total area of 1.79 square miles (4.64 km^{2}).

== Demographics ==
Historical populations
| Year | Pop. | ±% |
|---|---|---|
| 1880 | 500 | — |
| 2010 | 192 | −61.6% |
| 2020 | 186 | −3.1% |
Source:"U.S. Census website". United States Census Bureau. and Iowa Data Center; Source: U.S. Decennial Census

=== 2020 census ===
As of the census of 2020, there were 186 people, 92 households, and 71 families residing in the community. The population density was 105.8 inhabitants per square mile (40.8/km^{2}). There were 95 housing units at an average density of 54.0 per square mile (20.9/km^{2}). The racial makeup of the community was 97.8% White, 0.0% Black or African American, 0.0% Native American, 0.0% Asian, 0.0% Pacific Islander, 0.0% from other races and 2.2% from two or more races. Hispanic or Latino persons of any race comprised 1.6% of the population.

Of the 92 households, 13.0% of which had children under the age of 18 living with them, 70.7% were married couples living together, 6.5% were cohabitating couples, 16.3% had a female householder with no spouse or partner present and 6.5% had a male householder with no spouse or partner present. 22.8% of all households were non-families. 18.5% of all households were made up of individuals, 10.9% had someone living alone who was 65 years old or older.

The median age in the community was 55.5 years. 11.3% of the residents were under the age of 20; 3.8% were between the ages of 20 and 24; 12.4% were from 25 and 44; 53.2% were from 45 and 64; and 19.4% were 65 years of age or older. The gender makeup of the community was 64.5% male and 35.5% female.

=== 2010 census ===
As of the census of 2010, there were 192 people, 83 households, and 62 families residing in the city. The population density was 107.3 inhabitants per square mile (41.4/km^{2}). There were 93 housing units at an average density of 52 per square mile (20.1/km^{2}). The racial makeup of the city was 97.9% White, 2.1% from other races, and 2.1% from two or more races. 1.0% of the population were Asian and 1.0% of the population were African American.

There were 83 households, out of which 24.1% had children under the age of 18 living with them, 62.7% were married couples living together, 1.2% had a female householder with no husband present, 10.8% had a male householder with no wife present, and 25.3% were non-families. 24.1% of all households were made up of individuals, and 4.8% had someone living alone who was 65 years of age or older. The average household size was 2.31 and the average family size was 2.65.

The median age in the city was 49.2 years. 3.6% of residents were under the age of 5; 7.8% were between the ages of 15 and 19; 4.7% were from 25 to 29; 14.1% were from 45 to 49; and 17.2% were 65 years of age or older. The gender makeup of the city was 53.6% male and 46.4% female.

== Culture ==
Stone City was immortalized in a painting by Grant Wood in 1930. The painting is now on permanent display at Omaha's Joslyn Art Museum. Stone City, Iowa was Wood's first major landscape. The painting captures the sentiment Wood must have had for the area he lived all his young life. Although Wood did not include all of the buildings of Stone City at the time, many of the buildings featured in the painting still remain today. St. Joseph's Church, the general store, and the blacksmith shop are still there.

To view Grant Wood's painting, follow this link: Stone City, Iowa by Grant Wood

== Notable people ==
- Paul Engle (1908–1991) noted American poet, editor, teacher, literary critic, novelist, and playwright
- John Green (1844–1920), Iowa state senator
- George Nissen (1914–2010), developer of the modern trampoline
- Grant Wood (1891–1942), artist

== Gallery ==
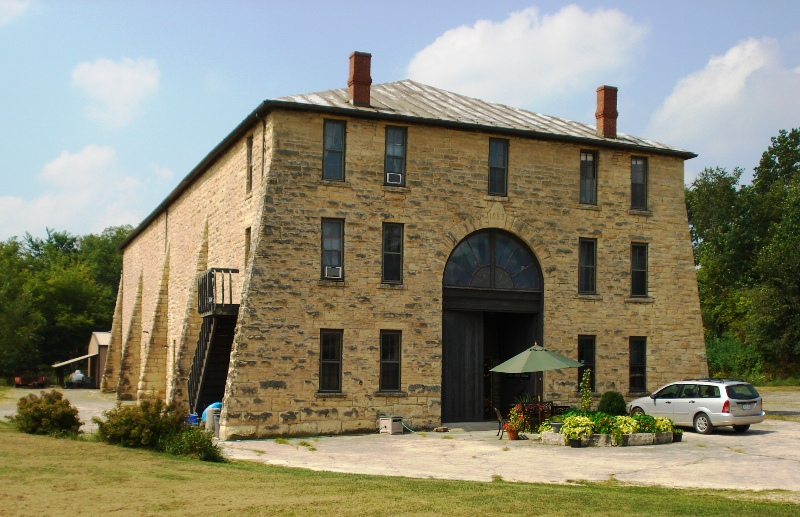
Stone barn built in 1889

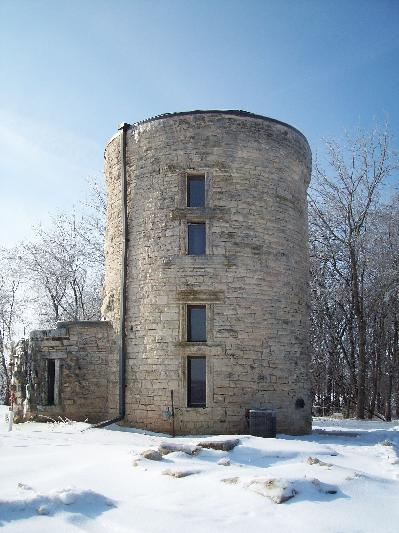
Stone water tower

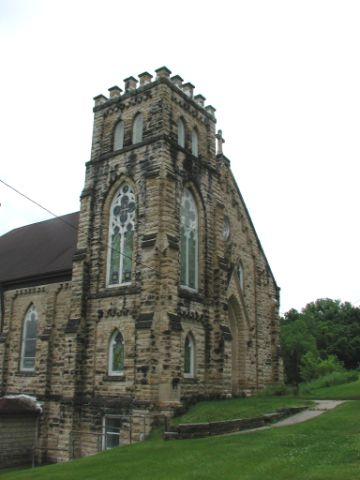
St. Joseph's Church

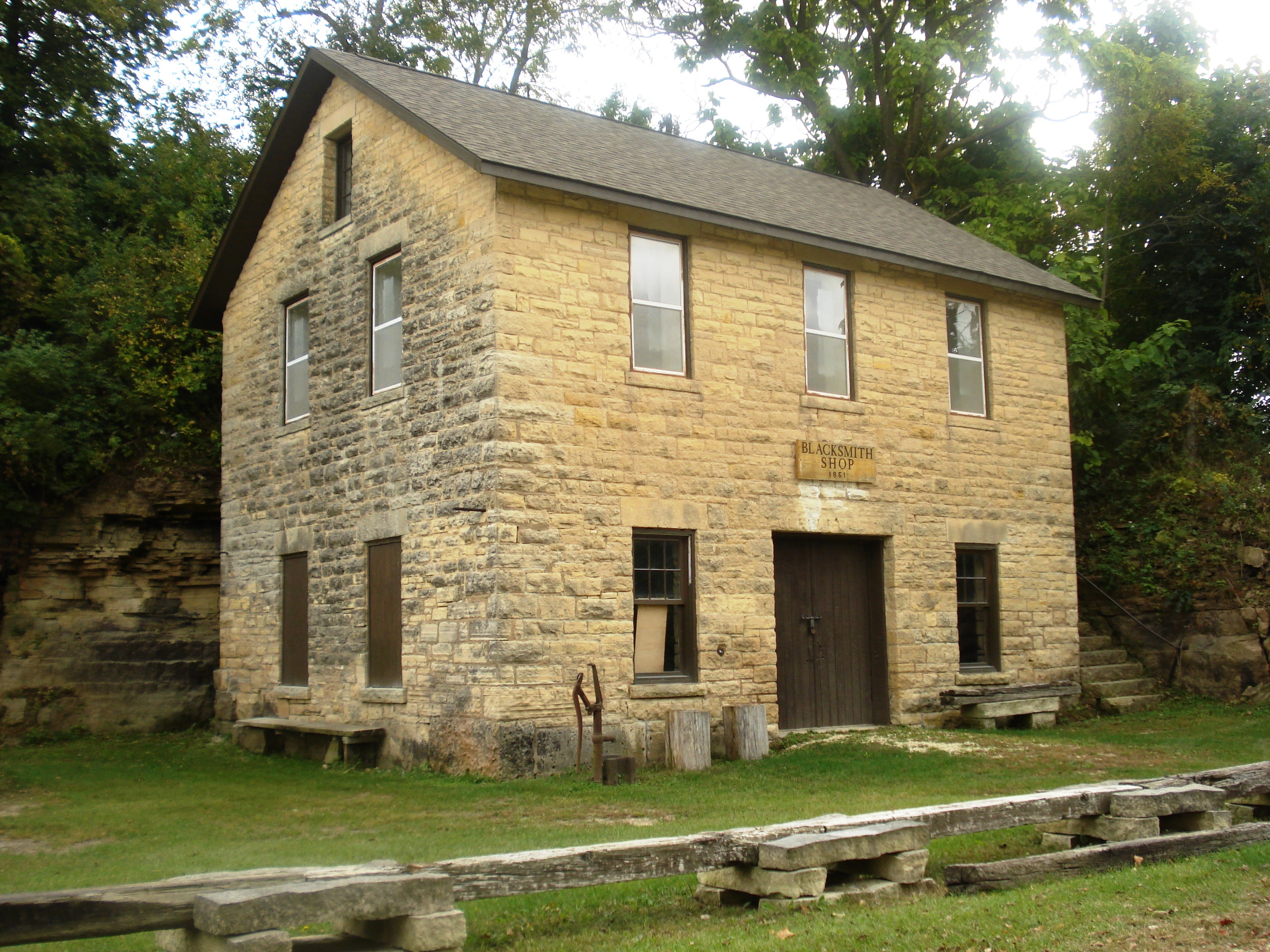
Blacksmith shop

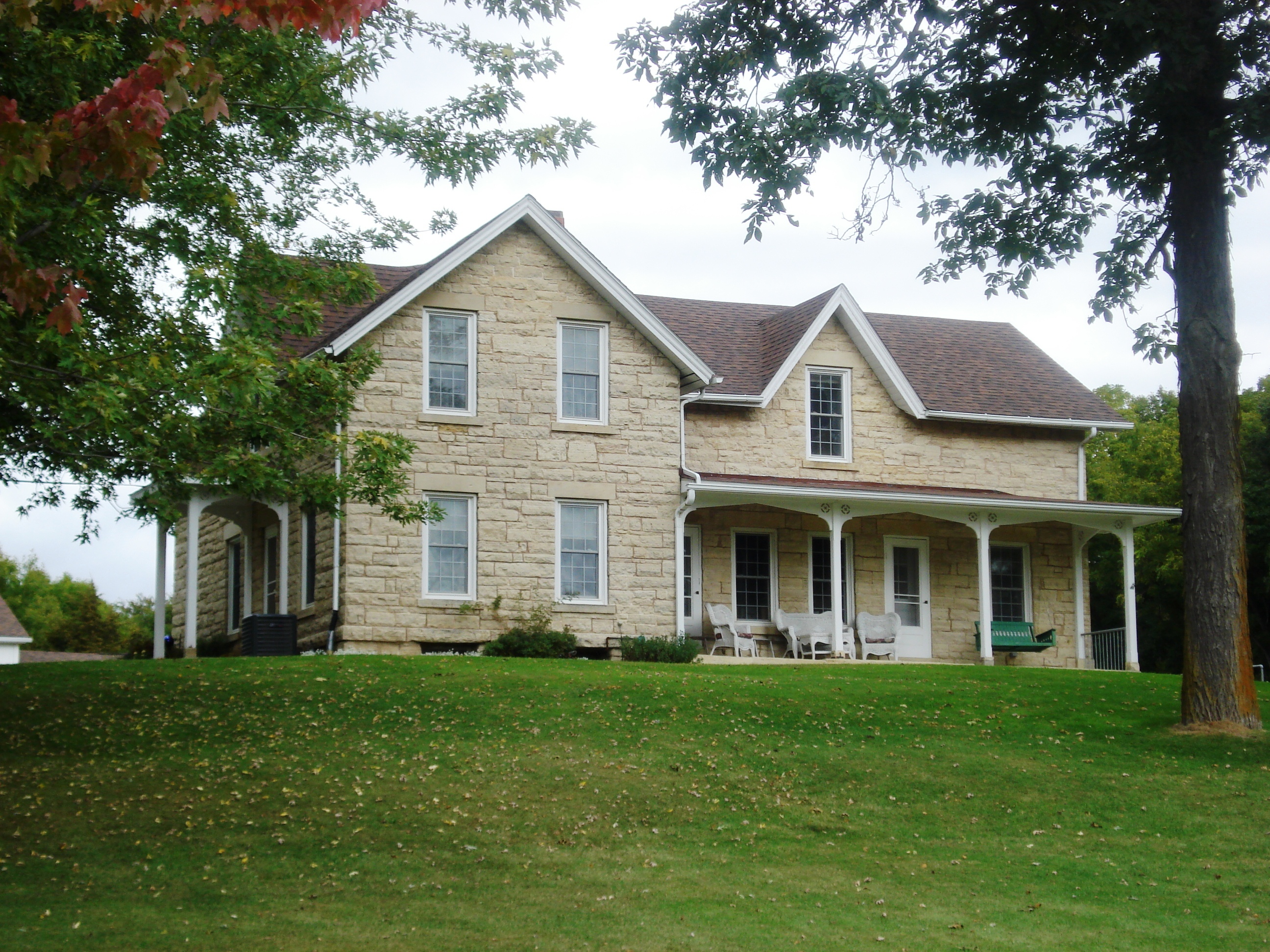
Dearborn residence

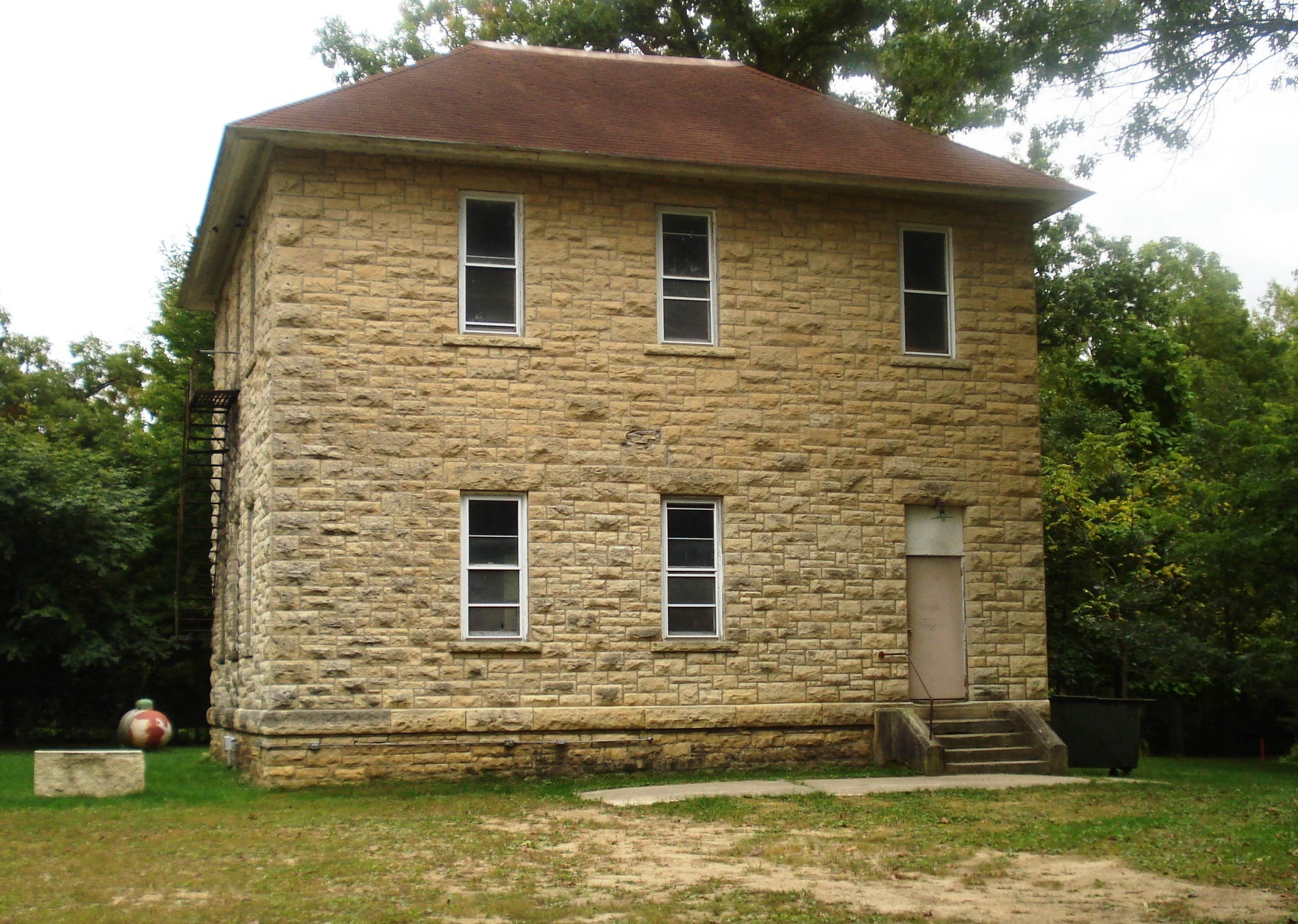
Stone City Community Center

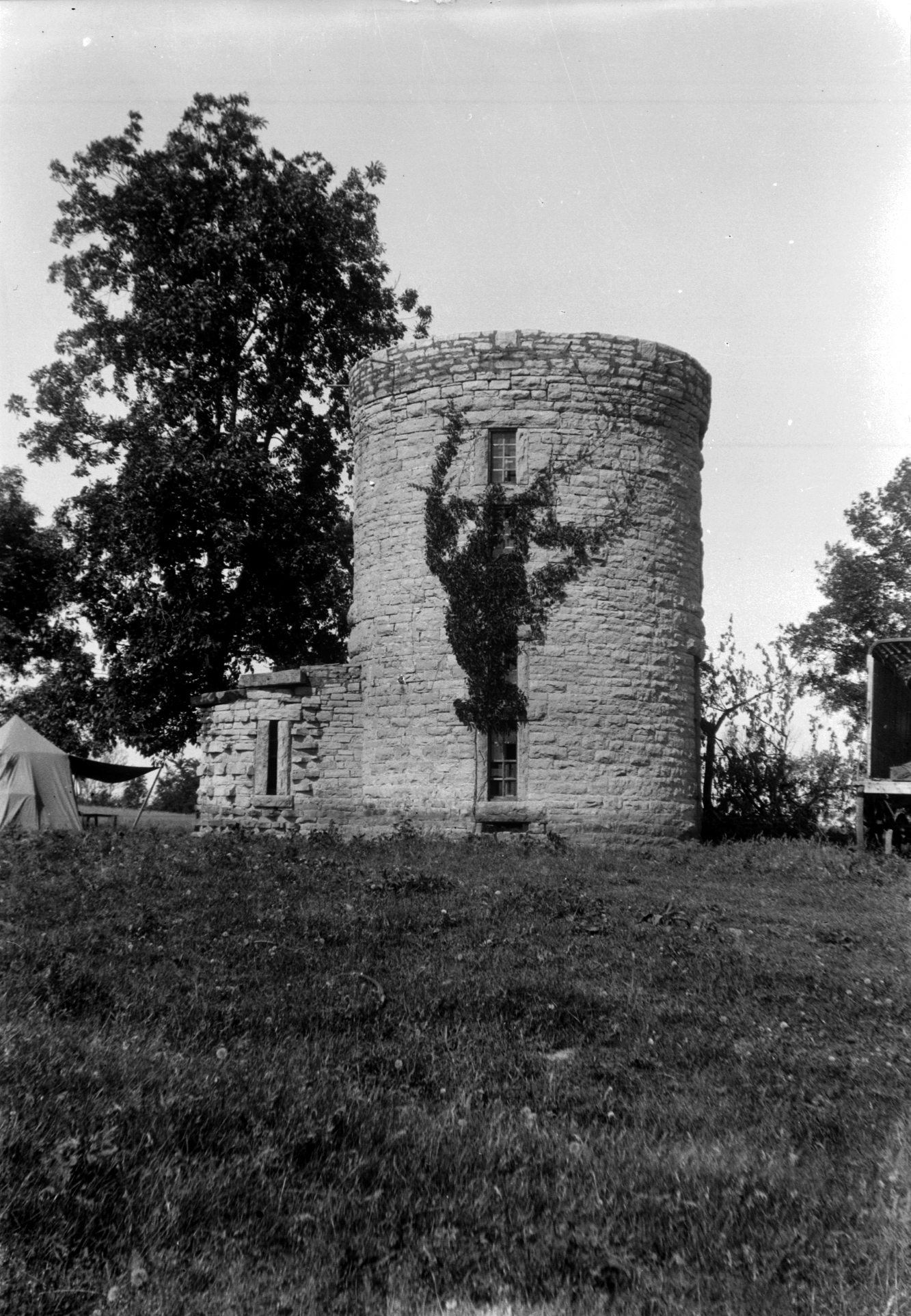
A stone round tower, taken during the 1932 Stone City Art Colony gathering

== See also ==
- Stone City Historic District
