= John Aloysius Green =

American mine owner (1844–1920)

John A. Green

Member of the Iowa Senate from the 24th and 25th district
- In office 1892–1904

Personal details
- Born: 10 December 1844 Parish of Moore, Roscomon County, Ireland
- Died: 25 February 1920 (aged 75) Cedar Rapids, Iowa
- Party: Republican
- Spouse: Ellen
- Children: Mary, Anna, Joseph, Ellen and James (twins), Leo, Rose, Agnes, Robert, and Josephine
- Occupation: Businessman, Farmer, Stone Cutter

John Aloysius Green was born in the parish of Moore, County Roscommon, Ireland, 10 December 1844. His parents were John Green and Bridget (Kenny) Green. John A. Green came to Boston, Massachusetts, September 2, 1852, and attended the common schools. In 1860 he learned the monumental trade and worked at it for ten years. Later he worked in granite, sandstone and last of all limestone.

Mr. Green came west in 1865, living for a time in Joliet, Illinois. In 1867 he worked at the Rock Island Arsenal as a stone-cutter, and in the same year he went to Wyoming, where he cut stone for Union Pacific bridges, forty miles west of Cheyenne. He returned to Joliet in the winter of the same year. March 17, 1868, then a lonely spot in the wilderness, now the site of Stone City, Iowa, a prosperous community in the late 19th century that added great wealth to the state and to Jones County, built, as its name indicates, on the business inaugurated by Mr. Green when he opened the Champion quarries.

Champion Quarry, October 19, 1895

For nearly fifty years, the quarries produced steadily, amounting to more than 4.5 billion dollars in sales. 1896 records indicate 1,000 men employed among the city's quarries, carving 160,000 loads of stone in a single year with a market value of 3.75 million dollars. In his most productive years (1869-1890s), J.A. Green operated three quarries (known as "Champion 1," "Champion 2," and "John Allen") using nearby Anamosa State Penitentiary labor. All provided high-quality stone to the Midwest. Green's various business ventures included other quarries in Iowa, Minnesota, and Missouri, as well as mason supply and sand dredging companies in Cedar Rapids, Iowa. With his financial success and a keen eye for marketing, Green soon envisioned a city made entirely of stone to accommodate the growing population (from 60 to almost 500 by 1880).

In 1875, he married Ellen Green, of Joliet, Illinois, and to them were born —Mary, Anna, Joseph, Ellen and James, twins, Leo, Rose, Agnes, Robert, and Josephine.

In addition to the Champion quarries, Mr. Green opened a quarry on Buffalo Creek, worked the old state quarry on the Wapsipinicon River for a time, a quarry at Wasioja, Minnesota, and one at Shuster, Missouri. He was the first in the United States to employ hydraulic power for stripping quarries, and he was also the first to load large holes with several hundred pounds of black powder, to shake the hills and loosen thousands of tons of stone at one blast. In 1892 he was elected to the Iowa Senate from the twenty-fourth senatorial district, a Republican division comprising Jones and Cedar counties. He was an unsuccessful candidate for congressional honors in 1904, receiving, however, 2,760 more votes than were given for the head of his ticket in the fifth congressional district of Iowa.
