= Anamosa Limestone =

Dolomitic limestone from Stone City, Iowa, USA

Anamosa Limestone or Anamosa Member is a dolomitic limestone quarried out of Stone City, Iowa, which is located along the Wapsipinicon River about two miles west of Anamosa, Iowa. It is distinguished by its uniform texture, color, banding, durability, and most of all, by its distinct planar and undulating varve–like laminations. This distinctive stone forms part of the Gower Formation, the youngest Silurian strata in Iowa. The Gower is overlain unconformably by a mid–Devonian formation. The color classification is Buff, which is described as a warm shade of light to moderate gold.

== Notable buildings ==
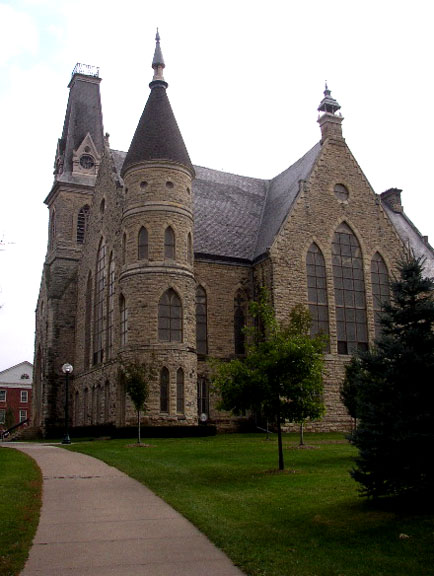
King Chapel, Cornell College

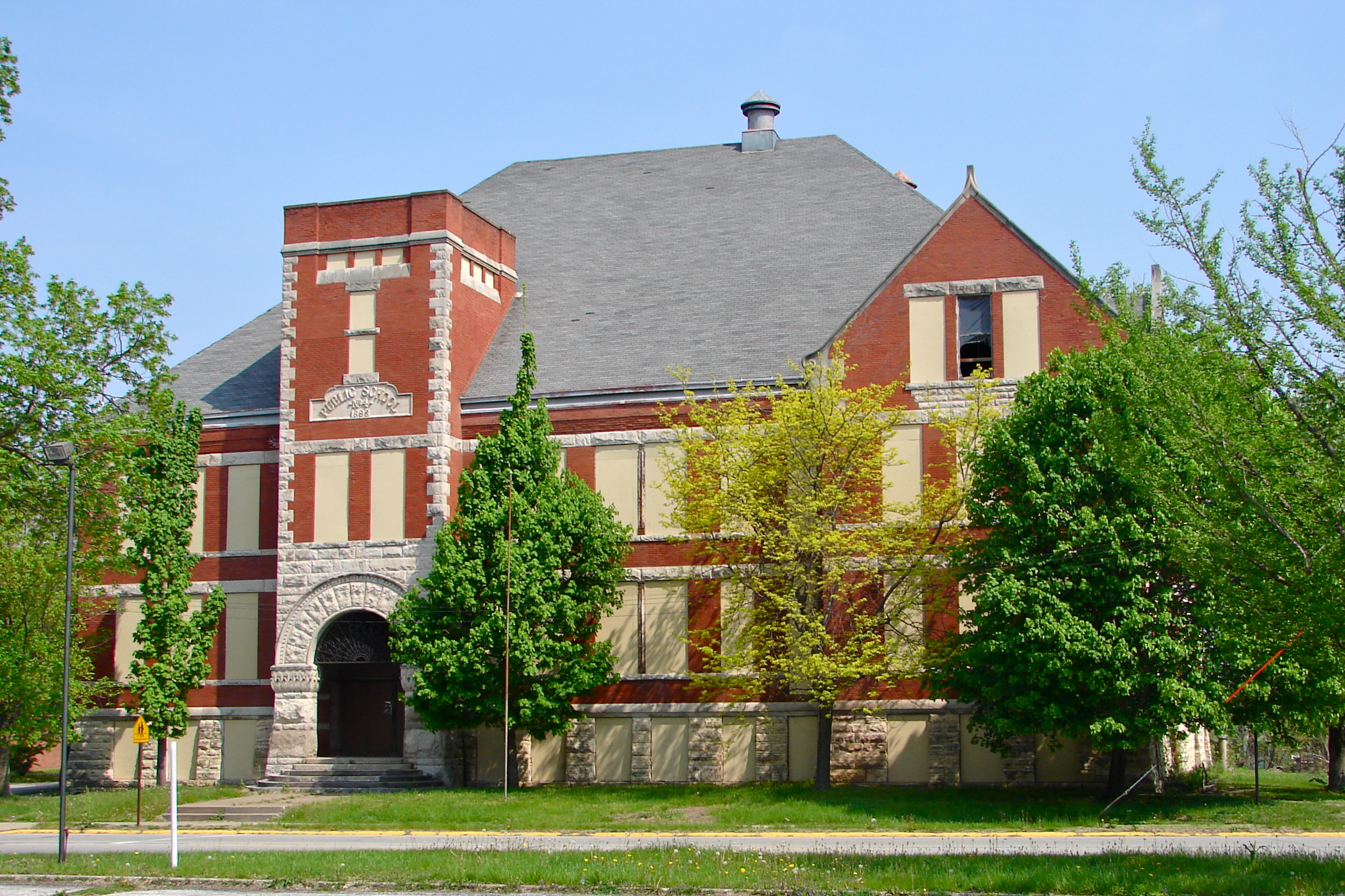
Lincoln School in Rock Island, Illinois

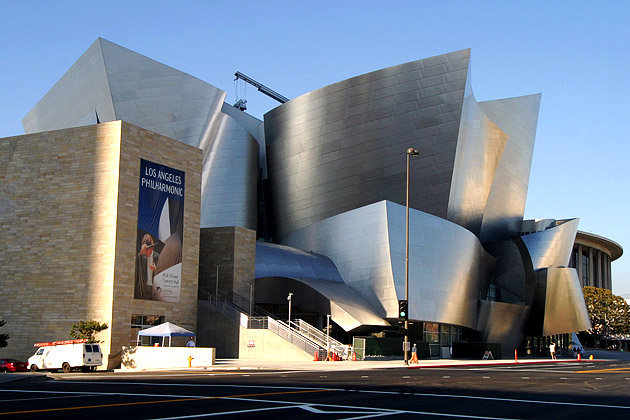
Disney Concert Hall

Anamosa Limestone has been quarried in Stone City since the 1850s and has been used in building construction, bridges, and bridge piers. Historic buildings such as King Chapel at Cornell College; Anamosa State Penitentiary in Anamosa, Iowa; and Lincoln School in Rock Island, Illinois were built using Anamosa Stone. Anamosa Stone can also be seen in new construction all over the United States, such as the Disney Concert Hall in Los Angeles, California.

== See also ==
- List of types of limestone
