= Cedar Rapids Museum of Art =

Coordinates: 41.9789°N 91.6643°W

- Established: 1905
- Location: 410 Third Avenue SE; Cedar Rapids, Iowa
- Type: Art museum
- Website: www.crma.org

The Cedar Rapids Museum of Art is a museum in downtown Cedar Rapids, Iowa, United States. The museum is privately owned and was established in 1905. The museum acquired the old Cedar Rapids Public Library building after the library moved into a new location in 1985. The current home of the museum, designed by post-modern architect Charles Moore, was built adjoining the old library in 1989.

The mission of the Cedar Rapids Museum of Art is to excite, engage, and educate its community and visitors through its collection, exhibitions and programs.

== Collection ==
Young Corn from the Grant Wood collection

The museum has significant collections from several prominent Iowa artists. The 63,000-square-foot (5,900 m^{2}) museum displays temporary exhibitions of contemporary art and hold the world's largest collection of works by Grant Wood, Marvin Cone, and Bertha Jaques, works by Mauricio Lasansky and the Riley Collection of ancient Roman portrait busts. The Grant Wood collection includes his paintings Woman with Plants and Young Corn. In 2002, the CRMA was given the building that houses the original studio of Grant Wood. Located just three blocks from the Museum, the loft studio, known by its fictitious address of 5 Turner Alley, was designed and constructed by Wood, who lived and worked there between 1924 and 1935. It was here that he painted American Gothic (1930)—now part of the collection of the Art Institute of Chicago—and many of his most famous paintings. The Grant Wood Studio is open to the public for guided tours on Saturdays and Sundays.

The Marvin Cone collection includes many of his best-known landscapes and abstracts. Cone was a collaborator and friend of Grant Wood.

The museum also includes significant pieces by Mauricio Lasansky, Malvina Hoffman, Ann Royer, Carl Van Vechten and many others.

== 2008 flood ==
Image of the 2008 flood

In 2008, the downtown of Cedar Rapids was devastated by the worst flood in the city’s recorded history. The lower storage areas and basements of the Museum were severely damaged by flooding that also threatened the exhibition spaces. The Cedar Rapids Museum of Art had just installed a $200,000 art storage system in its basement six months before the June floods. The Museum’s collection was moved to the higher levels and none of the artwork is known to have been damaged.
