= Tornado over Kansas =

1929 painting by John Steuart Curry

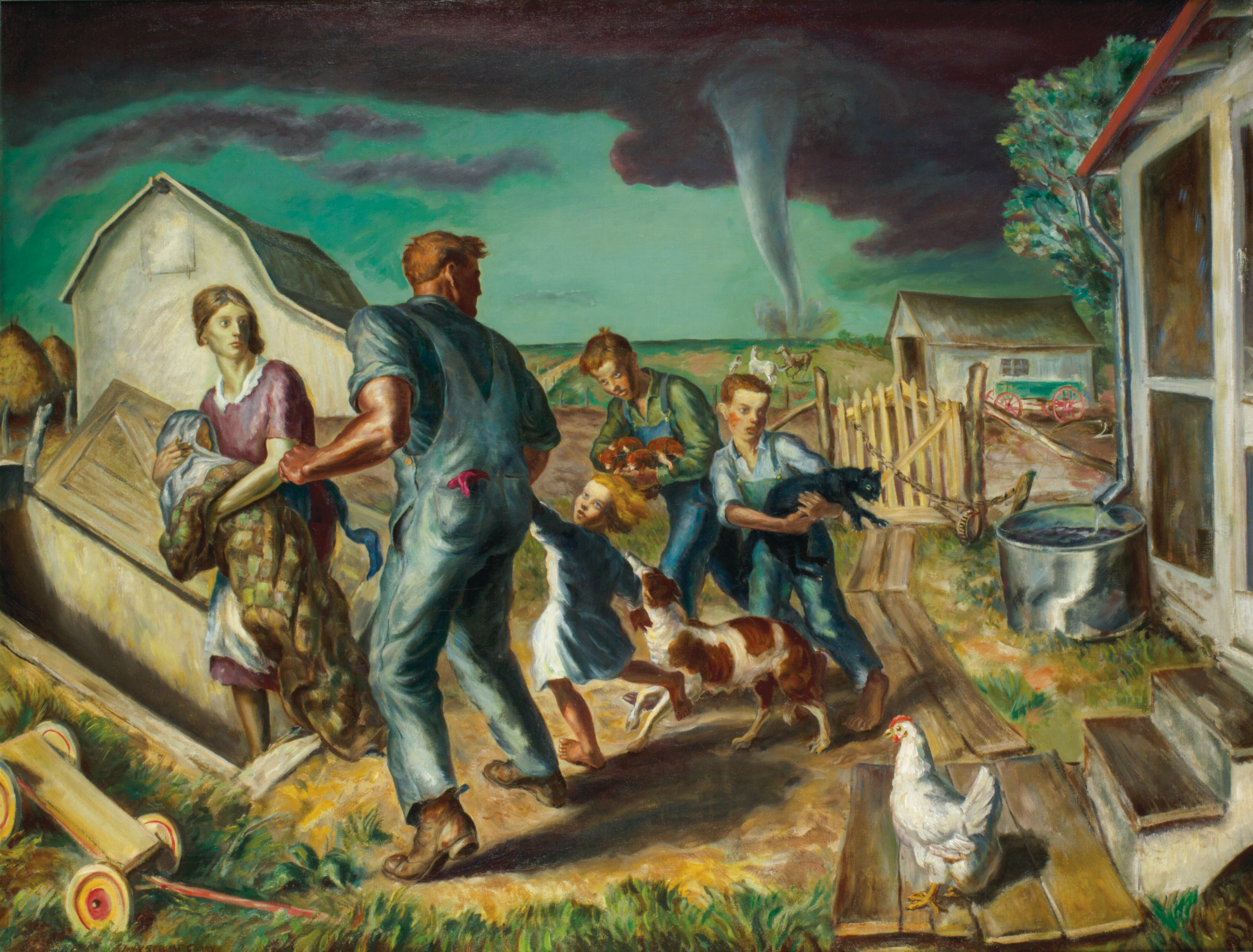
- Artist: John Steuart Curry
- Year: 1929
- Medium: Oil on canvas
- Dimensions: 117.5 cm × 153.35 cm (46.25 in × 60.375 in)
- Location: Muskegon Museum of Art, Muskegon, Michigan, US

Tornado over Kansas is a 1929 oil-on-canvas painting by the American Regionalist painter John Steuart Curry. It depicts a dramatic scene in which a family races for shelter as a tornado approaches their farm, and has compositional connections to Curry's earlier 1928 painting Baptism in Kansas. The artist is believed to have been influenced by Baroque art and photographs of tornadoes. He developed a fear of natural disasters and a reverence towards God during his childhood, both of which are apparent in the painting.

Following its 1930 debut, Tornado over Kansas was considered a notable Regionalist work, but native Kansans disliked the choice of subject matter. Although the painting won awards and was lauded by some, others criticized Curry's amateur style of painting. Curry's work attracted criticism from contemporary painters Stuart Davis and Thomas Hart Benton, and logical inconsistencies and technical errors in the composition have been noted.

Tornado over Kansas is among several of Curry's works depicting natural disasters in Kansas, including the 1930 painting After the Tornado and the 1932 lithographs The Tornado. It has been widely reproduced in publications including Time and Life magazines, and is now among Curry's best-known works. Since 1935, the painting has remained in the Muskegon Museum of Art.

== Composition ==
In Tornado over Kansas, sometimes referred to as just The Tornado, an incoming tornado towers in the background as part of a dark storm. A distressed Kansan farm family in the foreground hurries to enter their storm cellar. Nearest the entry is a green-faced mother cradling her infant. Close by, a red-headed father hurries his daughter and yells at his sons. The two sons are distracted with rescuing pets: one holds onto a struggling black cat and another brings a litter of puppies, watched closely by their canine mother. Panicked horses can be seen beyond the farm's buildings. In the midst of the chaos, a complacent chicken refuses to move.

The painting's tornado is regarded for its physical accuracy, an accomplishment that was possibly aided by first-hand descriptions and photographs. The art historian Lauren Kroiz, however, noted multiple "compositional perplexities". The placement of the son with the cat behind the porch steps suggests that the family ran along the path covered in wooden boards, but a chained wooden gate blocks that path. The filled metal tub beside the porch indicates recent rainfall, yet no other parts of the scene appear wet. Finally, all of the painting's figures cast shadows except, inexplicably, for the mother.

Tornado over Kansas is described as an example of Regionalist painting: by the mid-1930s, art critics were identifying any depictions of daily life in the rural Midwest as "regionalist". The work illustrates a "direct representation" of the artist's own land in favor of the "introspective abstractions" of contemporary European painting, which—according to a 1934 Time article on the contemporary U.S. art scene—were qualities characteristic of Regionalism.

== Context ==
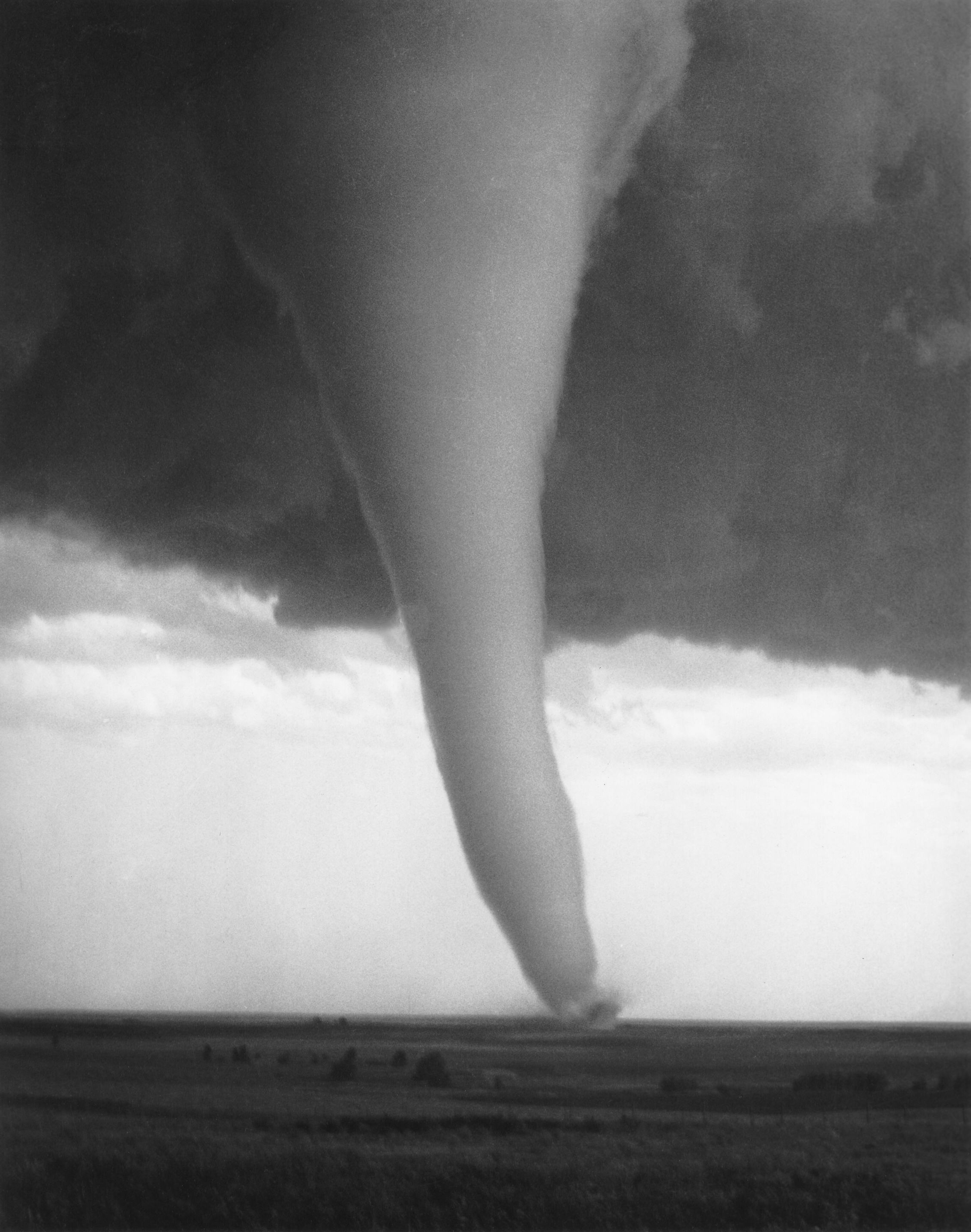
Photograph of the 1929 Hardtner, Kansas, tornado that may have influenced Tornado over Kansas

John Steuart Curry was born in Dunavant, Kansas, in 1897. He left in 1918 to attend Geneva College in Pennsylvania, where he worked as an illustrator for several years. He established a reputation as a painter with his critically acclaimed 1928 work Baptism in Kansas. Curry did not return to Kansas until 1929, when he traveled from his home in Westport, Connecticut, to visit his family's farm in Dunavant for six weeks. During this stay, the extreme weather and storms of the prairies inspired Curry to paint Tornado over Kansas, which he finished by fall of 1929. Curry's widow stated he had never witnessed a tornado in person, but he was likely familiar with accounts of tornadoes' destructive power. Photographs of a June 2, 1929, F2 tornado passing through Hardtner, Kansas, were among the first to clearly capture a tornado's shape, and the art curator Henry Adams proposed that they may have served as visual guidance for Curry's tornado in Tornado over Kansas. The funnel shape seen in one photograph closely resembles that of the painting's tornado, and another photograph of the tornado approaching a barn is believed to have inspired the painting's compositional layout.

Storms and tornadoes were not new to Curry; such natural disasters had frightened him ever since he was a child. He said that Tornado over Kansas was based on early life experiences when his family "used to beat it for the cellar before the storm hit." The art historian Irma B. Jaffe posited that Curry's Christian religious upbringing led to his construing natural disasters as signs of God's punishment. Thus, Jaffe saw Tornado over Kansas as one of Curry's attempts at controlling his fears through artistic expression.

Natural disasters are a common motif in Curry's art. He sketched the ruins of Winchester, Kansas, following a May 1930 tornado, and made watercolors of horses panicked by lightning, a dust storm in Oklahoma, and the aftermath of floods along the Kansas River during the summers of 1929 and 1930. Curry's 1929 painting Storm over Lake Otsego was painted shortly after Tornado over Kansas, and has figures comparable to those of its predecessor. His 1930 work After the Tornado depicts an unharmed and smiling doll seated in a chair amid the wreck of a house recently destroyed by a tornado. In 1932, Curry produced a series of lithographs known as The Tornado, which show a family taking shelter from a coming storm. One impression from the set was sold for $13,750 in 2020, while others are held by museums including the Metropolitan Museum of Art, the National Gallery of Art, and the Whitney Museum of American Art. Curry's 1934 landscape Line Storm contains a cloud system similar to that in Tornado over Kansas. Furthermore, a tornado appears behind the abolitionist John Brown in the painter's 1937–1942 mural Tragic Prelude.

== Commentary and influence ==
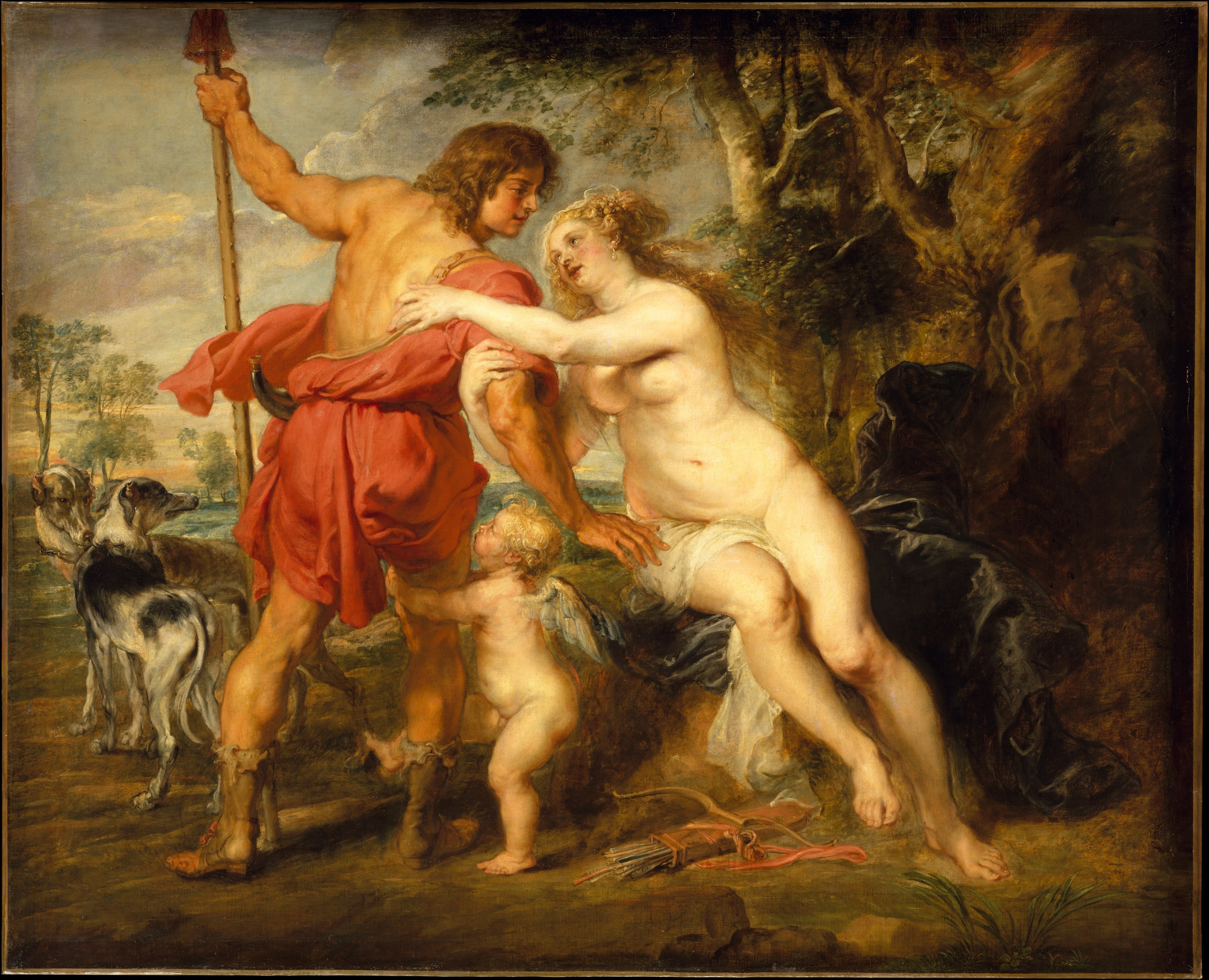
Venus and Adonis (1635), Peter Paul Rubens

According to Kroiz, the composition is "almost theatrically staged". Adams interpreted the barn on the left and the outbuilding to the right as the coulisses, or scenery flats, of a stage set. The painting's sense of drama is heightened by giving some of the figures others to rescue. The principal figures are painted as character stereotypes: the father is broad-shouldered and strong, while the mother and the daughter seem fearful and helpless as they look towards the father; despite the imminent danger, the two sons prioritize grabbing their pets. Adams considered the scene to be either a celebration or dismemberment of traditional American family values. Less ambiguous is the art historian J. Gray Sweeney's interpretation that Tornado over Kansas is an achievement of Curry's goal to "depict the American farmer's incessant struggle against the forces of nature."

The central figures are reminiscent of paintings by Baroque artists like Peter Paul Rubens, whom Curry studied. Adams wrote that the turning father resembled Adonis in Rubens's 1635 painting Venus and Adonis, while the art historian Karal Ann Marling described the father as "Michelangelesque"; Marling also likened the mother and infant to a Madonna and Child.

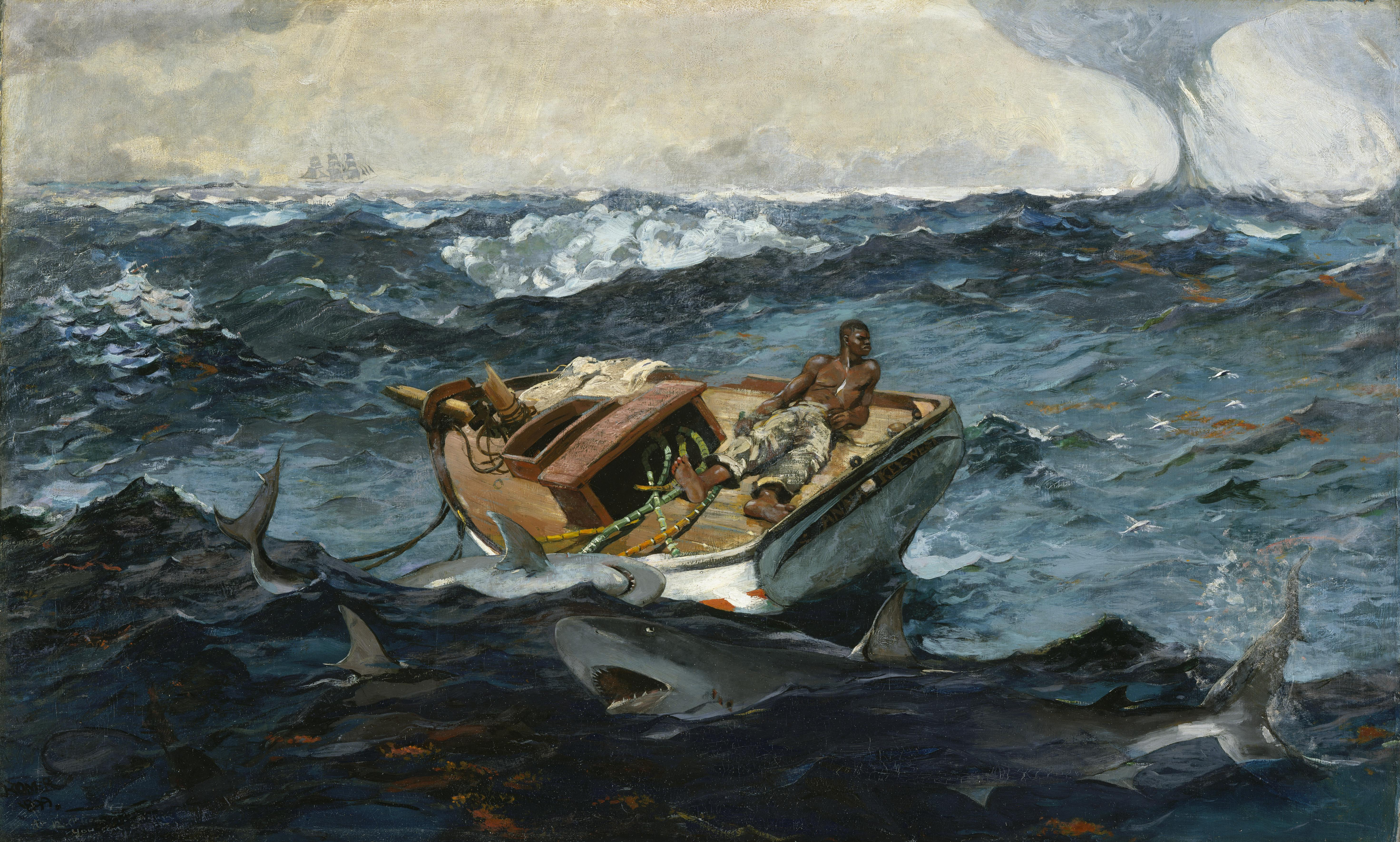
The Gulf Stream (1899), Winslow Homer

Adams said no American painter before Curry depicted a tornado in such a frightening manner. One artistic precedent is the waterspout in the background of Winslow Homer's 1899 The Gulf Stream, but Adams found this "far less frightening" than Curry's tornado because the waterspout plays a secondary role to the sharks that dominate the foreground. Adams noted another "direct precedent": the tornado in L. Frank Baum's 1900 novel The Wonderful Wizard of Oz, which also strikes a Kansas farmstead.

Tornado over Kansas is viewed as a sequel to Curry's 1928 Baptism in Kansas, though the former is considered visually and psychologically more dramatic than the latter. The two works share similar settings, and in both, crowded groups of figures in the foregrounds create a sense of claustrophobia (which Curry suffered from) while the near empty backgrounds evoke agoraphobia. Further similarities can be found in their fundamental shape patterns: inverting the water tank and windmill in Baptism in Kansas results in a "spiraling form" that resembles the tornado in Tornado over Kansas.

== Reception and provenance ==
The painting was met with universal critical acclaim when first exhibited in 1930 at the Whitney Studio Club where it won a second-place award. It received another second-place prize at the 1933 Carnegie International exhibition in Pittsburgh. A 1931 exhibition at a show of Curry's work in Wichita, Kansas, was less successful. Two years later, a Time article on the exhibition described Curry's tornado as a "giant cornucopia" and wrote that Kansans found the painting "uncivic". Marling explained this negative reaction, writing that locals did not want to see "[their state exposed] to opprobrium on account of a twister or two", especially by an artist native to the state. For example, Elsie Nuzman Allen—the art-collecting wife of former Kansas governor Henry Justin Allen—complained that Curry painted cyclones and other "freakish subjects" instead of "the glories of his home State".

In 1934, Time magazine featured a color reproduction of the painting as part of an article on the contemporary U.S. art scene. It described Curry as "the greatest painter of Kansas" and Tornado over Kansas as one of his most famous works. The article did note that many Kansans were irritated by his paintings, as they believed that the subject matter "[was] best left untouched". Due to the magazine's readership of 485,000 during the 1930s, Time helped give Regionalist works a national audience while also eliciting resentment among some over the art movement's sudden popularity. For example, the American modernist painter Stuart Davis objected to Time's portrayal of Tornado over Kansas and other Regionalist paintings. In 1935, Davis even accused Curry of behaving "as though painting were a jolly lark for amateurs, to be exhibited in county fairs." Those who agreed with Davis included critics, historians, and even some of Curry's own friends who considered his paintings to be "labored", "conventional", or "embarrassing".

The amateurish draftsmanship was noted by scholars including Kroiz, who wrote that Curry's use of color created "a riot of tertiary hues that confuse the viewer's eye". She described the work's green-blue shadows as "strange", and believed that the lighter halo-like region around the father's head was due to a mistake made while Curry was painting in the sky. Thus, Kroiz found that the painting is in stark contrast to more technically proficient works by the contemporary Regionalist painter Thomas Hart Benton. Benton even lamented that Curry's work sometimes had "a touch of vulgarity and cheapness". Curry himself admitted to both Tornado over Kansas's compositional shortcomings and his then lack of technical expertise, revealing what scholars interpreted as possible signs of the artist's depression, stress, and self-doubt. Nonetheless, Curry's openness instructed the public, and Kroiz believed it helped make painting more approachable for amateurs and common people. Sweeney was less critical than Kroiz in his assessment of the painting, describing Curry as "the least polemical and chauvinistic" of the Regionalists and writing that Curry's color and methods were "extremely sophisticated" in Tornado over Kansas.

In 1931, real estate broker H. Tracy Kneeland offered to purchase Tornado over Kansas. In a letter to Curry, Kneeland explained his attraction to the work:

I find ... a certain native quality which interests me because I was born and brought up in Michigan and while I have never seen a tornado of this kind I can well remember school being let out and running for dear life for home, with the branches torn off the trees ... the whole picture seems to strike a home chord in me.

Nevertheless, Tornado over Kansas was acquired in 1935 by the Hackley Art Gallery (now the Muskegon Museum of Art) from Ferargil Galleries, a venue for exhibitions of Curry's work during the early 1930s.

Laurence Schmeckebier wrote in his 1943 biography of Curry that Tornado over Kansas was its artist's "best known and in many ways his greatest painting." The work was widely reproduced in surveys of American art published in the 1930s and 1940s. It has appeared in over 150 publications, including the 1936 first issue of Life magazine, and the 1996 film Twister. Because of its artistic and cultural significance, Tornado over Kansas was described by the Muskegon Museum of Art as a "national treasure" and a defining work of Curry's career and the Regionalist movement.

== See also ==
- List of artwork by John Steuart Curry
