= Freeing of the Slaves =

1942 painting by John Steuart Curry

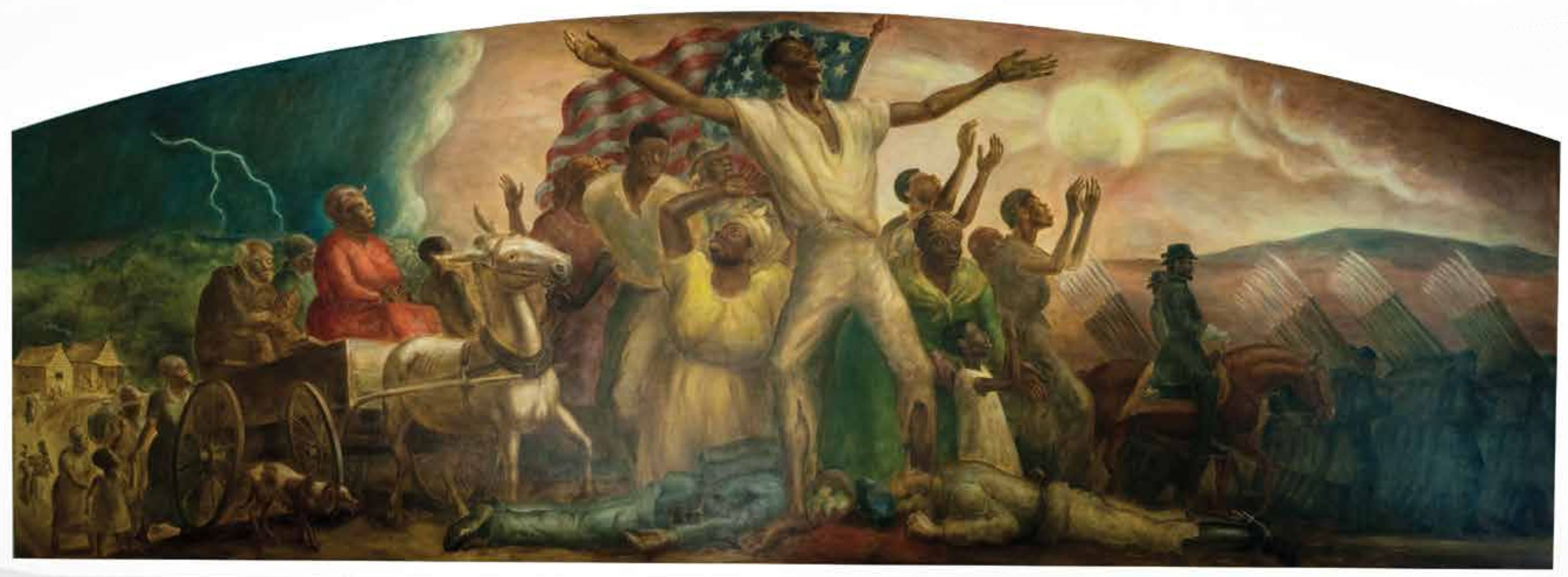
- Artist: John Steuart Curry
- Year: 1942
- Medium: oil and egg tempera
- Dimensions: 4.267 cm × 11,277 cm (1.680 in × 4,440 in)
- Location: University of Wisconsin-Madison; Madison

Freeing of the Slaves is an oil and tempera on canvas painting by American artist John Steuart Curry, created in 1942. It is an allegory to the Emancipation Proclamation and the abolition of slavery in the United States, in 1864. It is exhibited at the Law Library's Quarles and Brady Reading Room, in the University of Wisconsin-Madison, in Madison.

== History and description ==
This painting was originally intended to be displayed at the United States Department of Justice building, in Washington, D.C., but was rejected because it was considered too controversial. Lloyd K. Garrison, the former Law School dean of the University of Wisconsin-Madison helped the artist to complete the painting, which happened in 1942, during the ten-year period that he spent at that university as artist in residence (1936–1946).

The final composition recalls others of Curry, such as Tragic Prelude, his glorification of John Brown. It is also filled with figures. From the left, the painting depicts groups of freed slaves who are leaving their farms, under a stormy sky, to walk behind Unionist troops. These troops march on, as a new sunny day breaks in, standing for the end of the war and the emancipation of the slaves.

A black man stands at the center of the composition, with his arms outstretched and looking to the skies, in a sign of gratitude. Behind him there are other free black men and women, some of them also making similar gestures. At the feet of the joyful man, there are two corpses, one of a Union soldier, to the left, and other of a Confederate. A national flag of the United States, complete with all the states of the Union, is proudly displayed at the center.

== See also ==
- List of artwork by John Steuart Curry
