= Oklahoma Land Rush =

Oklahoma Land Rush may refer to:

- the Oklahoma portion of the Land Rush of 1889
- The Oklahoma Land Rush (Lucky Luke), a comic
- The Oklahoma Land Rush, April 22, 1889, a mural by American painter John Steuart Curry in the Department of the Interior building in Washington, D.C.
