= Westward movement =

Westward movement may describe:

- The ideology of manifest destiny in American history
- United States territorial acquisitions involving historical expansion of the United States territory westward
- The mural "Westward Movement: Justice of the Plains and Law Versus Mob Rule" by American artist John Steuart Curry
