= Thomas Craven =

American author, critic and lecturer (1888–1969)

- Sketch of Thomas Craven by George Grosz from the cover of the September 30, 1939 Saturday Review of Literature
- Born: Thomas Jewell Cravens; January 6, 1888; Salina, Kansas
- Died: February 27, 1969 (aged 81); Boston, Massachusetts
- Occupations: Author, lecturer, critic, art historian
- Notable work: Men of Art and Modern Art: the Men, the Movements, the Meaning
- Spouse: Aileen St. John-Brenon (m. 1923; div. 1947)
- Children: Richard

Thomas Craven (January 6, 1888 – February 27, 1969) was an American author, critic and lecturer, who promoted the work of American Regionalist painters, Thomas Hart Benton, John Steuart Curry and Grant Wood, among others. He was known for his caustic comments and for being the "leading decrier of the School of Paris."

== Life ==
He was born in 1888, in Salina, Kansas, the son of Richard Price and Virginia Bates Cravens. He graduated from Kansas Wesleyan University in 1908. He was described as "a red-haired Kansan, as unassuming in private conversation as he is dogmatic on the printed page. He has been a reporter in Denver, a schoolmaster in California and Porto Rico (sic), a deckhand in the West Indies, an unsuccessful painter and poet." He was friends with numerous artists of his day including George Grosz and Thomas Hart Benton. At the outset of his career as a writer, Craven dropped the letter "s" from the end of his surname. He married Aileen St. John-Brenon on August 25, 1923, and they were divorced in 1947. He summered in West Tisbury, on Martha's Vineyard, and moved there permanently in 1949. He died in Boston, Massachusetts, on February 27, 1969, at the age of 81.

== Writing career ==
He wrote numerous books, several very popular, including, Men of Art and Modern Art: the Men, the Movements, the Meaning, which were Book-of–the-Month club selections. Another of his books, A Treasury of Art Masterpieces: from the Renaissance to the Present Day reached the bestseller list and was re-issued several times. In addition, he contributed essays, articles and criticisms to numerous periodicals, including Scribners, Harpers, The Dial, The Nation, The New Republic, The American Mercury, and The Forum. At one time, he was the art critic for the New York American. An example of his "no holds barred" writing comes from the Introduction to Modern Art; the Men, the Movements, the Meaning:

There is one exception – Modigliani. I have included this gifted wastrel as a specimen of the effects of Bohemianism on the artist. Modigliani was a real artist but not a great one. He had talent and charm, but was incapable of self-discipline. I have used him as a symbol of the multitudes of young men who go to the dogs in the slums of Paris.

However, although he could be caustic, he was equally capable of providing praise. In describing John Steuart Curry's painting Baptism in Kansas, he says, "There was no burlesque in the picture, no satire, no sophisticated fooling. It was conceived in reverence and spiritual understanding, and executed with an honesty of purpose that is all too rare in any art."

Thomas Craven's impact on the art world was significant. Any literature discussing the Regionalist painters refers to Mr. Craven's work. He is discussed in Renegade Regionalists by James M. Dennis, John Steuart Curry's Pageant of America by Laurence E. Schmeckebier, and Tom and Jack: The Intertwined Lives of Thomas Hart Benton and Jackson Pollock by Henry Adams. His influence is best described by Time magazine's review of his book, Men of Art:

Today the entire U. S. art world pays attention to him.

== Works ==
Selected essays

- Men of Art: American Style, The American Mercury, December 1925.
- George Bellows, The Dial, February 1926.
- Have Painters Minds?, The American Mercury, March 1927.
- The Criticism of Painting in America, The American Mercury, August 1927.
- The Decline of Illustration, The American Mercury, October 1927.
- Daumier, The Fighting Cartoonist, The Forum, September 1932
- In Behalf of Boers, The American Spectator, April 1933.
- Art and Propaganda, Scribner's, March 1934.
- Nationalism in Art, The Forum, June 1936.
- Double-Dealers in Art, Scribner's, April 1938.
- Our Decadent Art Museums, The American Mercury, December 1941.

Books

- Paint, Harcourt, Brace and Company, 1923.
- Men of Art, New York: Simon & Schuster, 1931.
- Modern Art: the Men, the Movements, the Meaning, New York: Simon & Schuster, 1934.
- A Treasury of American Prints: a Selection of One hundred Etchings and Lithographs by the Foremost Living American Artists, New York: Simon & Schuster, 1939.
- A Treasury of Art Masterpieces: from the Renaissance to the Present Day, New York: Simon & Schuster, 1939; Simon & Schuster, 1977, ISBN 978-0-671-22776-0.
- Thomas Hart Benton, a descriptive catalogue of the works of Thomas Hart Benton...with an examination of the artist and his work, Associated American Artists, 1939.
- The Story of Painting, From Cave Pictures to Modern Art, Simon & Schuster, 1943.
- Cartoon Calvalcade, A Collection of the Best American Humorous Cartoons from the Turn of the Century to the Present, Simon & Schuster, 1943 (editor).
- The Pocket Book of Old Masters. With W. Somerset Maugham and Walter Pater, edited by Herman J Wechsler. Pocket Books, Inc., 1949.
- Famous Artists and their Models, New York: Pocket Books, 1949.
- The Pocket Book of Greek Art, Pocket Books, 1950.
- Rainbow Book of Art, World Publishing Company, 1956; World Pub., 1972, ISBN 978-0-529-04616-1.
