= Tragic Prelude =

1942 mural by John Steuart Curry

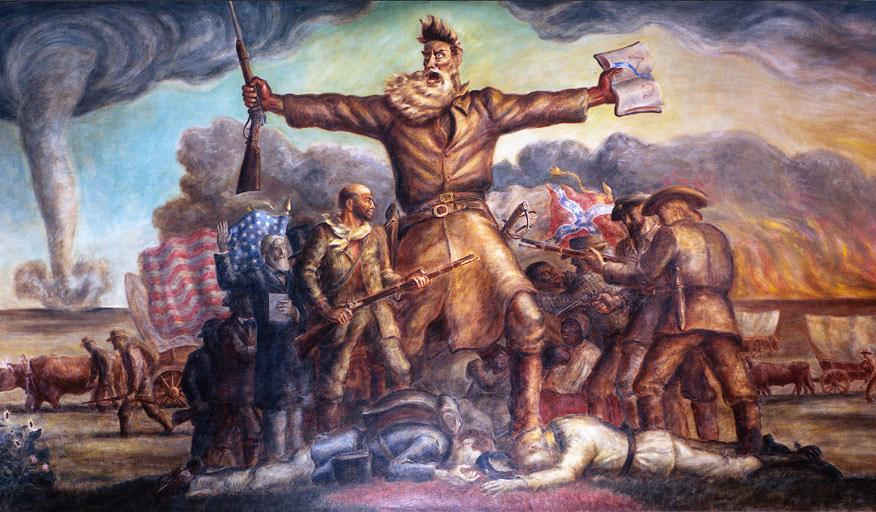
- Tragic Prelude, north wall. John Brown in front of and between fighting Union and Confederate soldiers.
- Artist: John Steuart Curry
- Year: 1942
- Medium: Oil and egg tempera
- Subject: History of Kansas, John Brown
- Dimensions: 345 cm × 945 cm (136 in × 372 in); 11'4" x 31'
- Location: Kansas State Capitol, Topeka, Kansas

Tragic Prelude is a mural painted by the American artist John Steuart Curry for the Kansas State Capitol building in Topeka, Kansas. It is located on the east side of the second floor rotunda. On the north wall it depicts the abolitionist John Brown with a Bible in one hand, on which the Greek letters alpha and omega of Revelation 1:8 can be seen. In his other hand he holds a rifle, referred to as the "Beecher's Bibles". He is in front of Union and Confederate soldiers, living and dead, with a tornado and a prairie fire approaching. Emigrants with covered wagons travel from east to west.

The "tragic prelude" is the Bleeding Kansas period of 1854–1860, seen as a prelude to or dress rehearsal for the Civil War, a period of which John Brown was at the center, fighting to prevent Kansas from being made a slave state. The term "tragic prelude" for this period of Kansas history is attributed by Curry to his patron, the newspaper editor William Allen White.

However, the mural has other figures in addition to Brown, as it turns a corner and continues on another wall, making it difficult to photograph in its entirety. The three figures are rarely discussed as part of the work. Chronologically from right to left are the Franciscan missionary Fray Juan de Padilla and the conquistador Coronado, the first Europeans to visit the land that became Kansas, followed by a plainsman, who has just killed a buffalo.

It is by far Curry's most famous work. It is the only work of Curry's to have a book devoted solely to it. It is also well-known as the source material for the album cover of rock band Kansas' 1974 debut record.

== History ==
Emporia Gazette editor William Allen White began the campaign to get Curry to paint murals for his native Kansas rather than Wisconsin (whose university offered him employment he could not find in Kansas). Other newspapers joined in, and the result was the Kansas Murals Commission. Chaired by Governor Walter Huxman, it was charged with choosing a Kansas artist or artists to create murals for the Capitol, as Missouri artist Thomas Hart Benton had done in the Missouri State Capitol.

Benton's very large mural was on the topic of, and titled, A Social History of Missouri. The Commission decided, not without some controversy, that in contrast with the Missouri Capitol, where Benton was one of several artists, Curry would be the sole artist to create murals for the Kansas Capitol, on the theme of Kansas history. No state money was involved; White led a fundraising campaign that easily succeeded in raising the money to hire Curry.

Curry painted Tragic Prelude from 1937 to 1942, using egg tempera and oils. It is 11 feet 4 inches (350 cm) tall, and 31 feet (940 cm) long.

== Curry's description ==
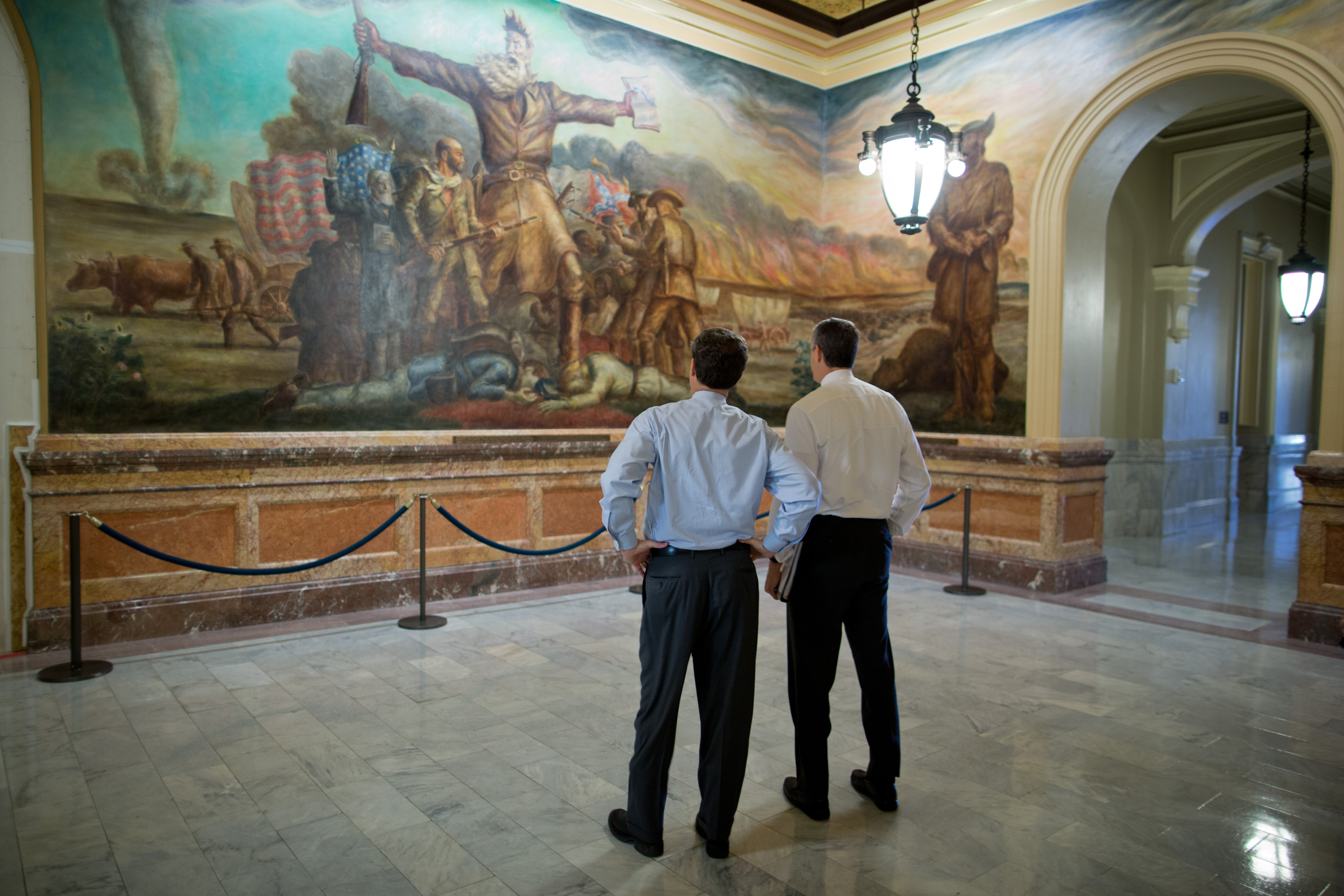
Kansas Governor Sam Brownback (left) and U.S. Secretary of Education Arne Duncan, 2012

Curry later described the work as follows:

Centered on the north wall (31′ x 11′6″ [9.4m x 3.5m]) is the gigantic figure of John Brown. In his outstretched left hand the word of God and in the right a "Beecher's Bible." Beside him facing each other are the contending free soil and pro-slavery forces. At their feet, two figures symbolic of the million and a half dead of the North and South. In this group is expressed the fratricidal fury that first flamed on the plains of Kansas, the Tragic Prelude to the last bloody feud of the English-speaking people. Back of this group are the pioneers and their wagons on the endless trek to the West, and back of all the tornado and the raging prairie fire, fitting symbols of the destruction of the coming Civil War.

In a newspaper interview of 1939, he explained that "I wanted to paint him as a fanatic, for John Brown was a fanatic. He had the wild zeal of the extremist, the fanatic for his cause—and we had the Civil War, with its untold misery." Later, he wrote in a letter: "I think he is the prototype of a great many Kansans. Someone described a Kansan as one who went about wreaking good on humanity. This might be the kernel of my conception."

== Rejection of Tragic Prelude ==
The Kansas Legislature rejected the mural and refused to hang it in the Capitol as planned. Curry left Kansas in disgust, abandoning the rest of his Capitol project, and did not sign this or the other completed work, Kansas Pastoral, because he considered the project incomplete. It was hung in the Capitol after his death. His planned first-floor rotunda panels never got beyond preliminary sketches. Much to the displeasure of some Kansans, and reflecting the views of agronomists at his employer, the Agricultural College of the University of Wisconsin, one panel blamed poor farming practices for the erosion and dust storms of the 1930s.

== Archival material ==
A study for the mural is in the Spencer Museum.

== In popular culture ==
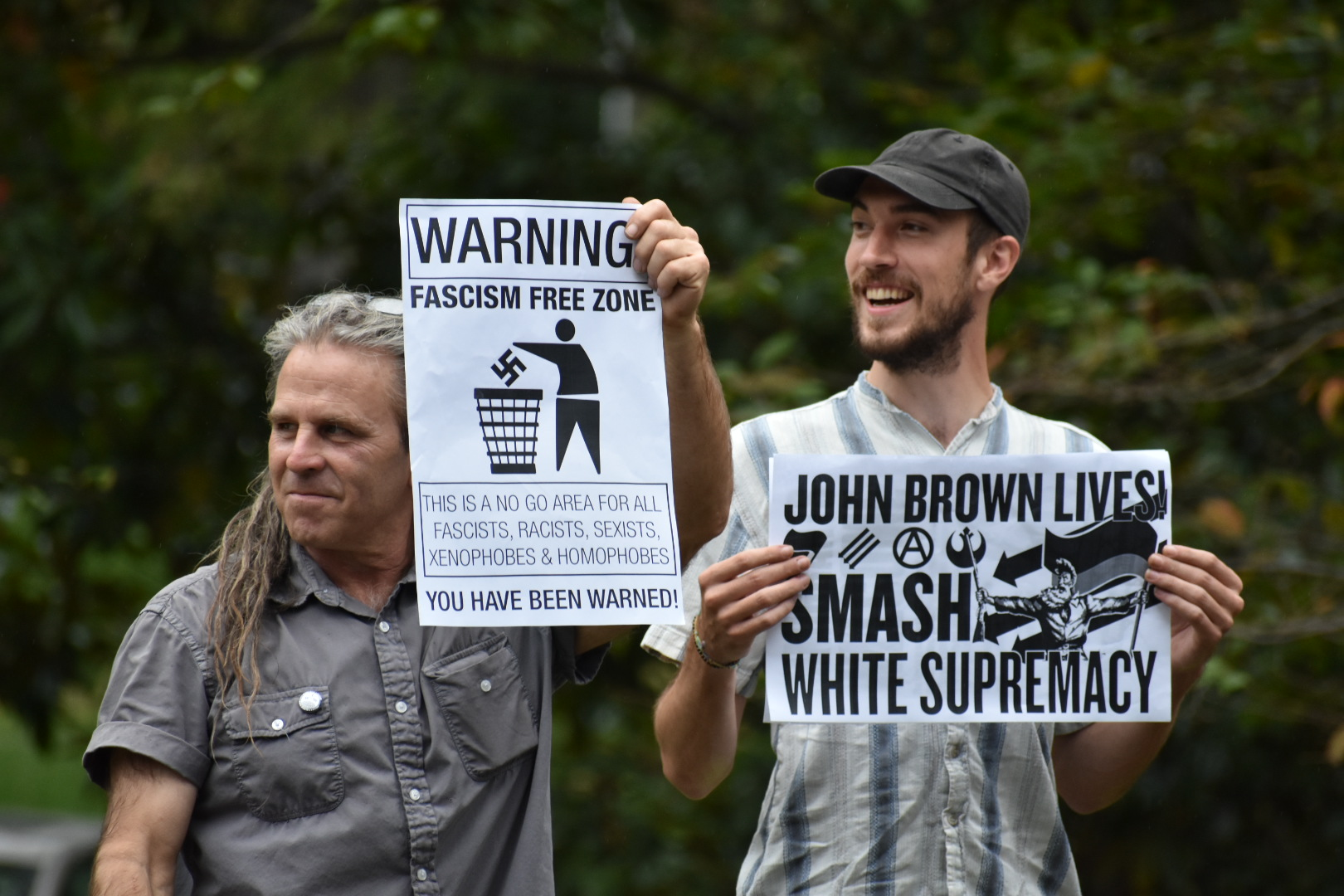
Tragic Prelude adapted into a modern flyer; Greensboro, NC, 2017.

The image was used as the album cover of Kansas (1974), the debut album of the rock band Kansas.

Poster recreations and T-shirts were made every year for the annual "Border War" between the University of Kansas and the University of Missouri. Free State Brewery in Lawrence, Kansas has produced John Brown Ale with an image of John Brown on the label that is reminiscent of the mural.

== See also ==
- List of artwork by John Steuart Curry
