= Baptism in Kansas =

Painting by John Steuart Curry

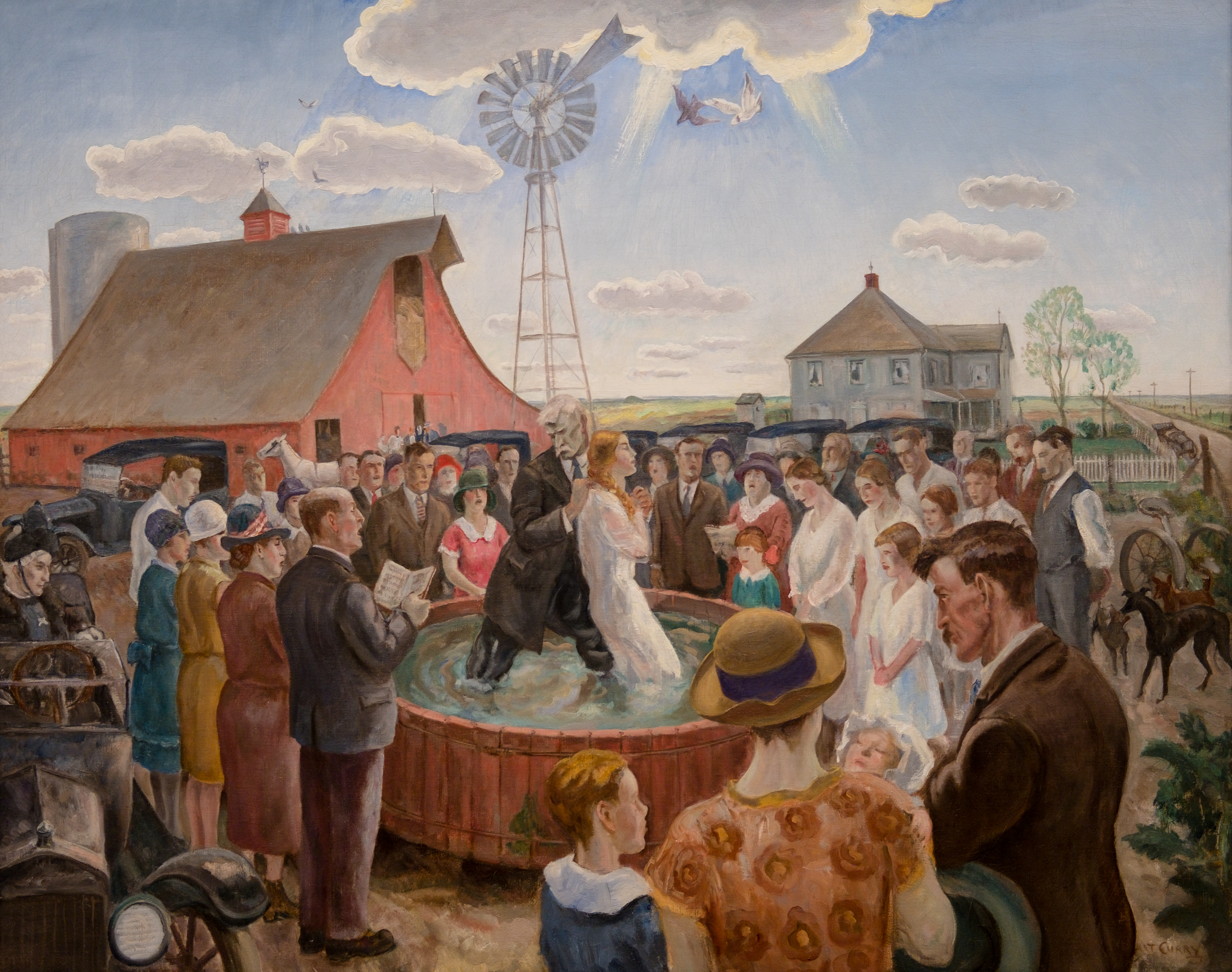
- Artist: John Steuart Curry
- Year: 1928
- Medium: Oil on canvas
- Dimensions: 102.2 cm × 127.6 cm (40 1/4 in × 50 1/4 in)
- Location: Whitney Museum of American Art; New York

Baptism in Kansas is an oil on canvas painting by the American painter John Steuart Curry, from 1928. It depicts a full-submersion baptism in a water tank. In the sky are a raven and a dove, a reference to the birds Noah released from the Ark. The painting is based on a scene Curry witnessed in 1915, when the creeks were dried up and the water tank was the only suitable site for the baptism. It was painted in August 1928.

The painting was first exhibited at the Eleventh Biennal Exhibition of Contemporary American Oil Paintings at the Corcoran Gallery of Art in Washington, D.C. It was bought by Gertrude Vanderbilt Whitney in 1930, and has belonged to the Whitney Museum of American Art since its inauguration in 1931. The painting launched Curry to national fame and is one of the most iconic paintings of the American Regionalist movement.

The critic Thomas Craven wrote about the painting: "There was no burlesque in the picture, no satire, no sophisticated fooling. It was conceived in reverence and spiritual understanding, and executed with an honesty of purpose that is all too rare in any art."

== See also ==
- List of artwork by John Steuart Curry
