= Dunavant, Kansas =

Unincorporated community in Kansas, U.S.

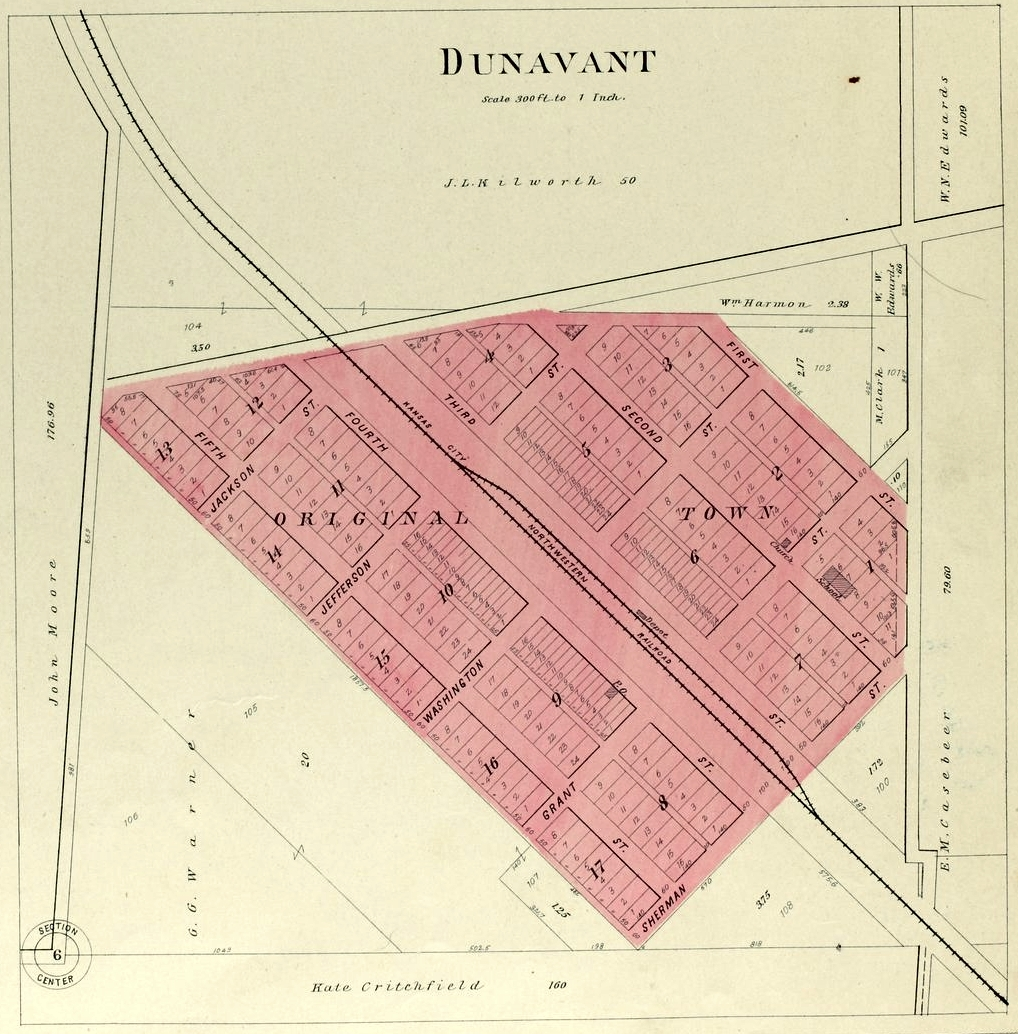
Plat map of Dunavant, 1878

Dunavant is an unincorporated community in Jefferson County, Kansas, United States.

== History ==
A post office was opened in Dunavant in 1888, and remained in operation until it was discontinued in 1932.

In 1910, Dunavant's population was 85 people. In 1912, Dunavant had a money order Post Office and a telegraph office, and was on a branch of the Missouri Pacific Railroad.

=== Battle of Hickory Point ===
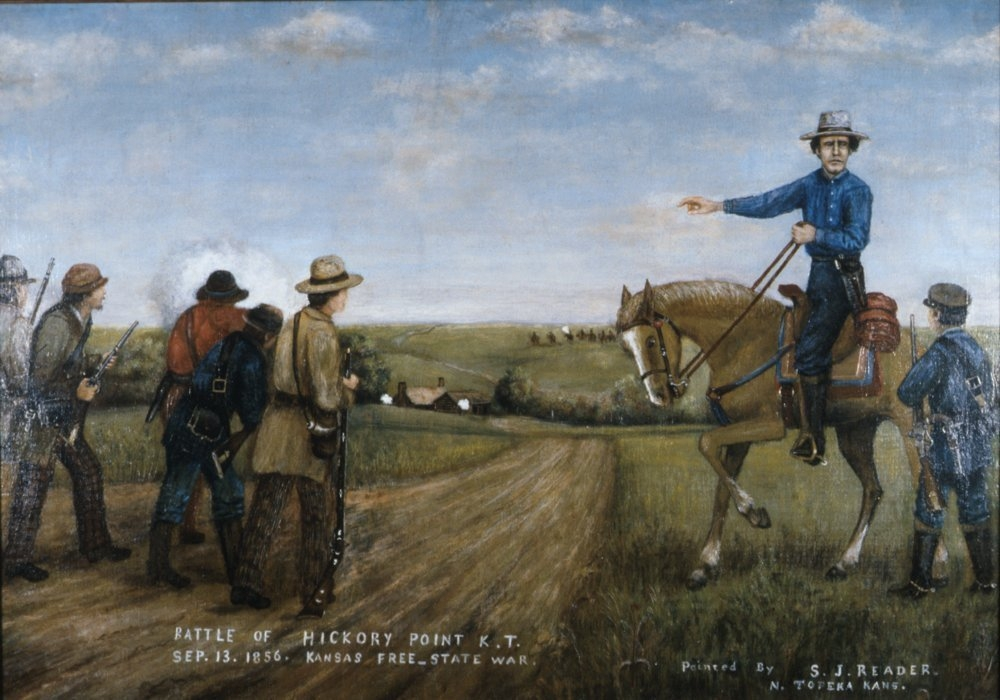
James Lane during the Battle of Hickory Point, by Samuel Reader

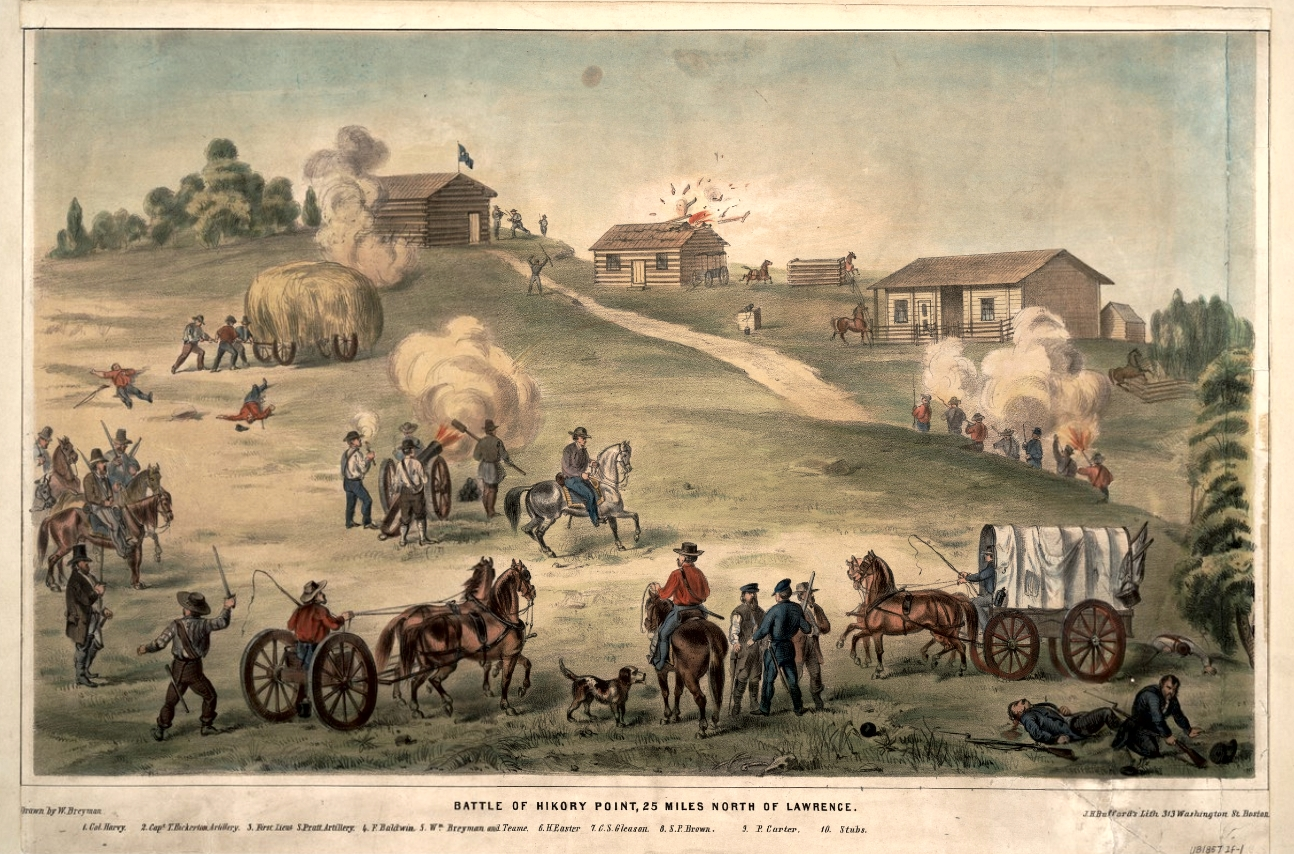
Second day of the Battle of Hickory Point

The Battle of Hickory Point proceeded on September 13 and 14, 1856. On September 13, 1856, James H. Lane, leader of Free-State men in Kansas, besieged a group of Border Ruffians in the log buildings near Dunavant at Hickory Point (also known as Stony Point), a proslavery settlement on the Ft. Leavenworth-Ft. Riley military road. Prior, this group of proslavery men led by Capt. H. A. Lowe had attacked Valley Falls, then called Grasshopper Falls. Among this band of the Border Ruffians were around 40 South Carolinians.

With a small force of jayhawkers Lane attacked but was repulsed. Lane then sent to Lawrence for artillery to drive the Border Ruffians out. Reinforcements led by Col. James A. Harvey arrived the next day, on September 14, 1856, and the skirmish ended with four Proslavery men wounded, one killed and five Free-State men injured. Around 100 Free-Staters were detained by U.S. troops afterwards, since the skirmish occurred after a declaration issued by Territorial Governor John W. Geary directing the cessation of all hostilities in the Kansas Territory. The Jayhawkers claimed self-defense and were released.

A Kansas Historical Marker for the Battle of Hickory Point stands a half mile away, on today's U.S. Route 59.

=== Farm where John Steuart Curry was born ===
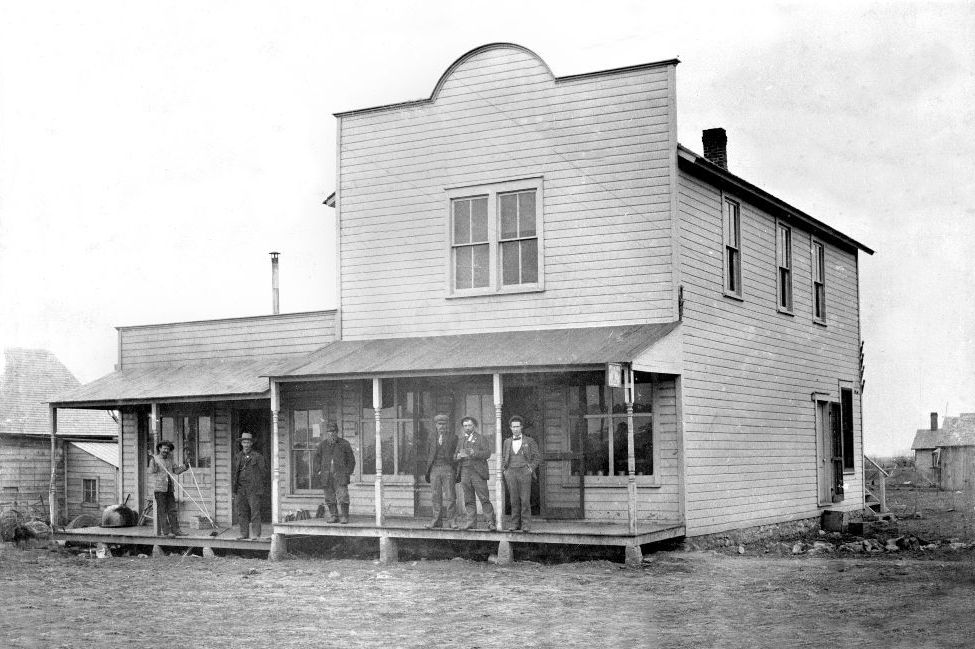
Becker Hardware Store and a pharmacy in Dunavant, circa 1880–1900

Also nearby, just 1/4 mi. from the Battle of Hickory Point marker, is the farm on which painter John Steuart Curry was born. The farmhouse has been moved to Oskaloosa and there are plans to turn it into a museum.

Later in life, John Steuart Curry would become known for his painting of abolitionist John Brown at the Kansas State Capitol, and also for his painting Law vs. Mob Rule at the Department of Justice in Washington, DC, in which a judge in black robes protects a man from a lynch mob.

== Geography ==
Dunavant is located at 39°18′07″N 95°19′58″W. Its elevation is 1,155 ft (352 m).

== Notable people ==
- John Steuart Curry (1897–1946), painter
