= Venus and Adonis (Rubens, 1635) =

Painting by Peter Paul Rubens

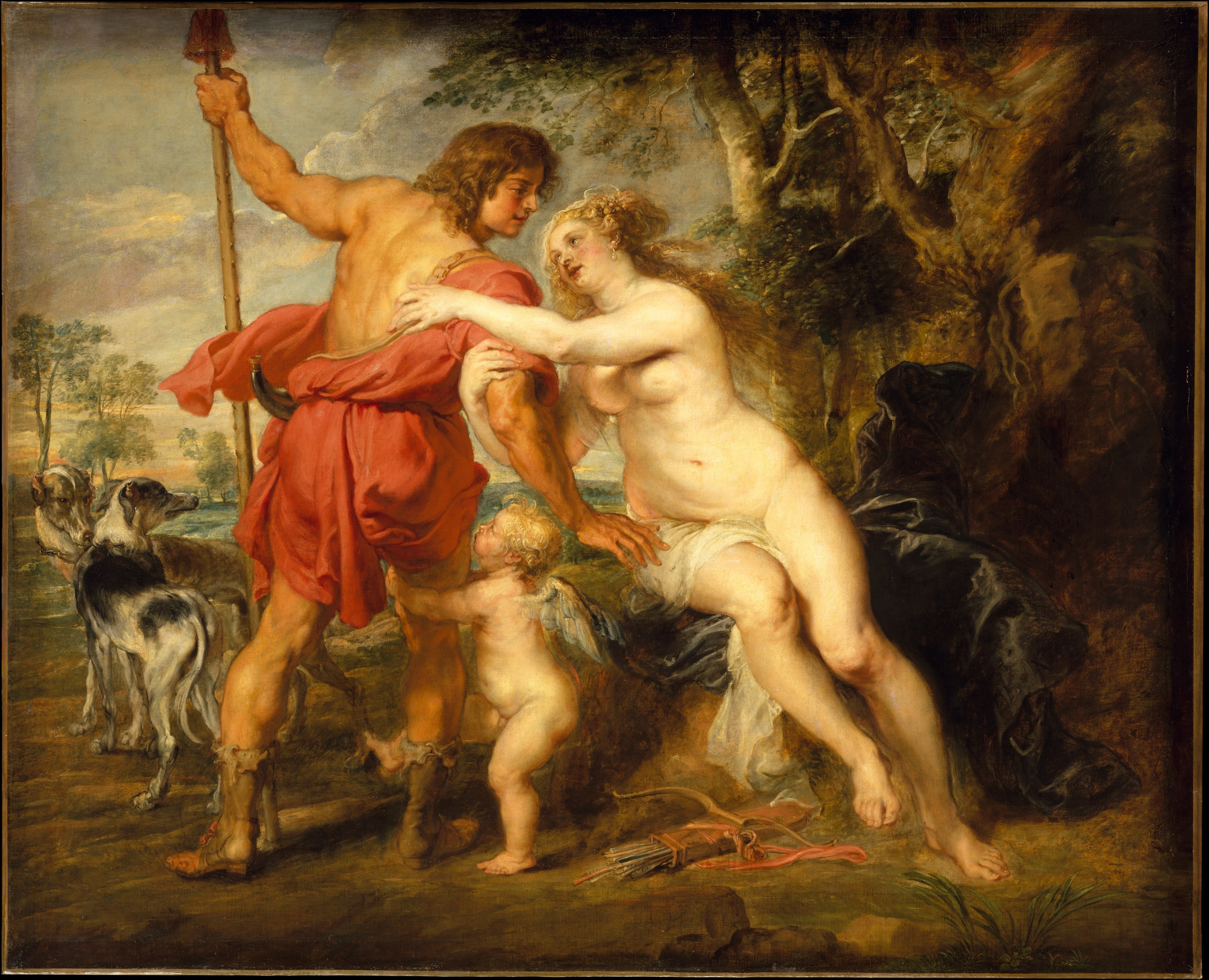
Venus and Adonis

In 1635, Peter Paul Rubens created Venus and Adonis, now in the Metropolitan Museum of Art, New York.

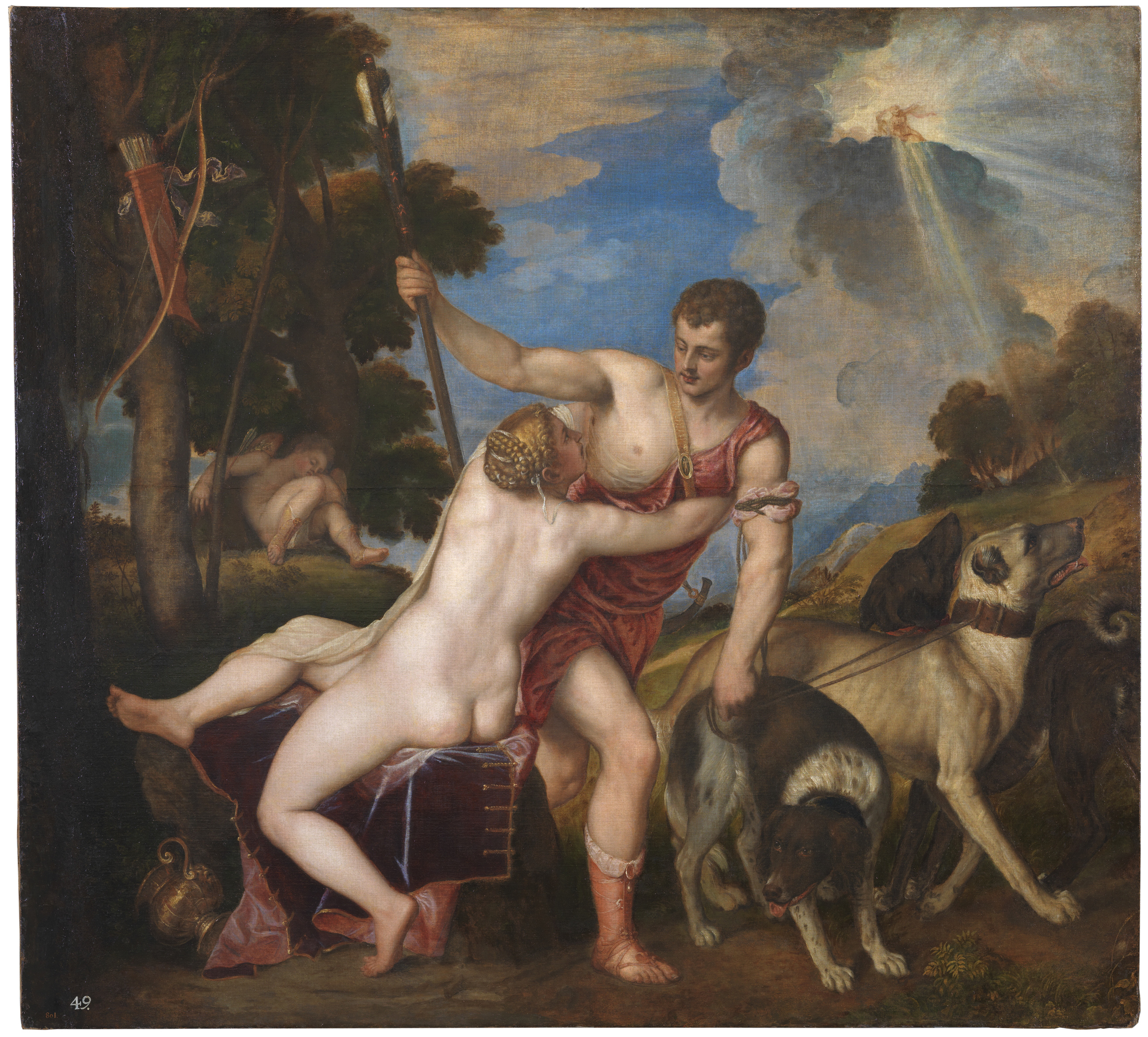
Venus and Adonis by Titian, Prado, 1554. The "Prado type"

== Rubens ==
Born in 1577 in Siegen, Peter Paul Rubens is considered one of the most influential Baroque artists, especially in Flemish Baroque tradition. During the early 1600s, Rubens was employed and patroned by Vicenco I Gonzaga. Working for Gonzaga allowed Rubens to travel all throughout southern Europe and gain knowledge and inspiration from high Renaissance and Baroque artists. This helped him develop his own artistic style. While in Madrid in 1628, Rubens produced a copy of Titian’s work and used it as influence for his piece.

== Location ==
Rubens’s Venus and Adonis was most likely painted as decoration for a large country house. he first records of the painting’s history were from the collection of the Elector of Bavaria, where it was held until 1706. It was then taken by Joseph I, Holy Roman Emperor who then presented it to John Churchill at Blenheim Palace until it was sold by the 8th Duke of Marlborough. In 1937, it was given to the Metropolitan Museum of Art by Harry Payne Bingham, who had loaned it to the Met since 1920. After this, the painting underwent major restoration as the museum removed discolored varnish and repaints, and displayed it like new. Once the cleaning was completed, art historians were able to narrow down the date, due to knowledge of Rubens’s styles during the 1600s. After this painting, Rubens created more depictions of this scene, one of which included Venus’s chariot and the two figures posed differently.

== Description ==
It is a large canvas, almost 8 feet square with added strips. The scene depicts a tall, tan Adonis facing the opposite direction of the viewer but turned back facing his lover, Venus. The background of the painting alters throughout as the left side of the background is light, but the right side is very dark, having the two figures stand out with their respective dark and light skin. Rubens uses formal elements of his Italian Renaissance influences and Baroque artistic sensibility to depict the popular mythological subject. For example, the bodies of these figures are anatomically realistic and beautiful. Also, the moody lighting of the painting makes them glow and stand out, a dramatic tenebrism similar to the works of southern Baroque artists Titian and Caravaggio.

Adonis is dressed in a bright red garment, making his figure stand out in front of all the other light and muted colors. The fabric has wrinkles and is very flowy, creating the sense of movement as he turns. His left foot is raised slightly above and behind the other, insinuating that he is about to take a step forward. While he is facing Venus, his gaze is not focused on her but is rather blank, as if he was preoccupied with something else. Unlike Titian’s work, Adonis is more focused on his hunt and the journey ahead, instead of Venus. Perhaps because this painting was intended for a country house, Rubens chose to emphasize Adonis’s role as a hunter. To emphasize this the artist includes Adonis’s hunting boots, a spear, and even the hunting dogs. The details on Adonis’s body are very realistic and natural. For example, the artist includes his curved spine as he turned, along with prominent lines, highlighting the muscles being used to turn. Rubens focus on Adonis’s muscles and the large spear he holds, emphasize his strong masculinity and power.

On Adonis’s right, Venus clings to him as she pulls him down. According to the narrative, she knows he is about to get killed and pleads to make him stay. Her face reads distress and sorrow as she looks straight at Adonis. Like Titian’s depiction, she is mostly nude but has a sheer white cloth that hangs out in between her legs. Rubens uses this and her full figured, curved body to represent innocence and fertility as most depictions of Venus do. The light and dark shadows on her body show movement as well as a realistic body complexion. For example, her stomach is long and stretched along with her left anatomical leg, showing her hopelessly reach out to Adonis. Her skin, like Cupid’s, is very bright and fair, making them stand out from the rest of the painting. This contrasts with Adonis’s tan skin and the flowing dark cloth and trees in her background. This choice of skin color, along with nudity, makes Venus and Cupid glow and look angelic or god-like. Also, the resemblance between the two is to highlight the mother and son relationship from this myth. Cupid clings to Adonis’ right leg, looking up to him and pleading for him to stay.

Cupid's arrows lie on the ground between Cupid and Venus. This reminds the viewer that Venus fell for Adonis by being pricked by an arrow. In the background, two of Adonis’s hunting dogs wait for him, unaware of the tense scene and ready to keep walking. The muted sky, dim trees and ground, and a slight dark and opaque border around the painting contrast with the figures to make the scene more dramatic. The figures seem to jump out from the frame.
