= John Steuart Curry =

American painter (1897–1946)

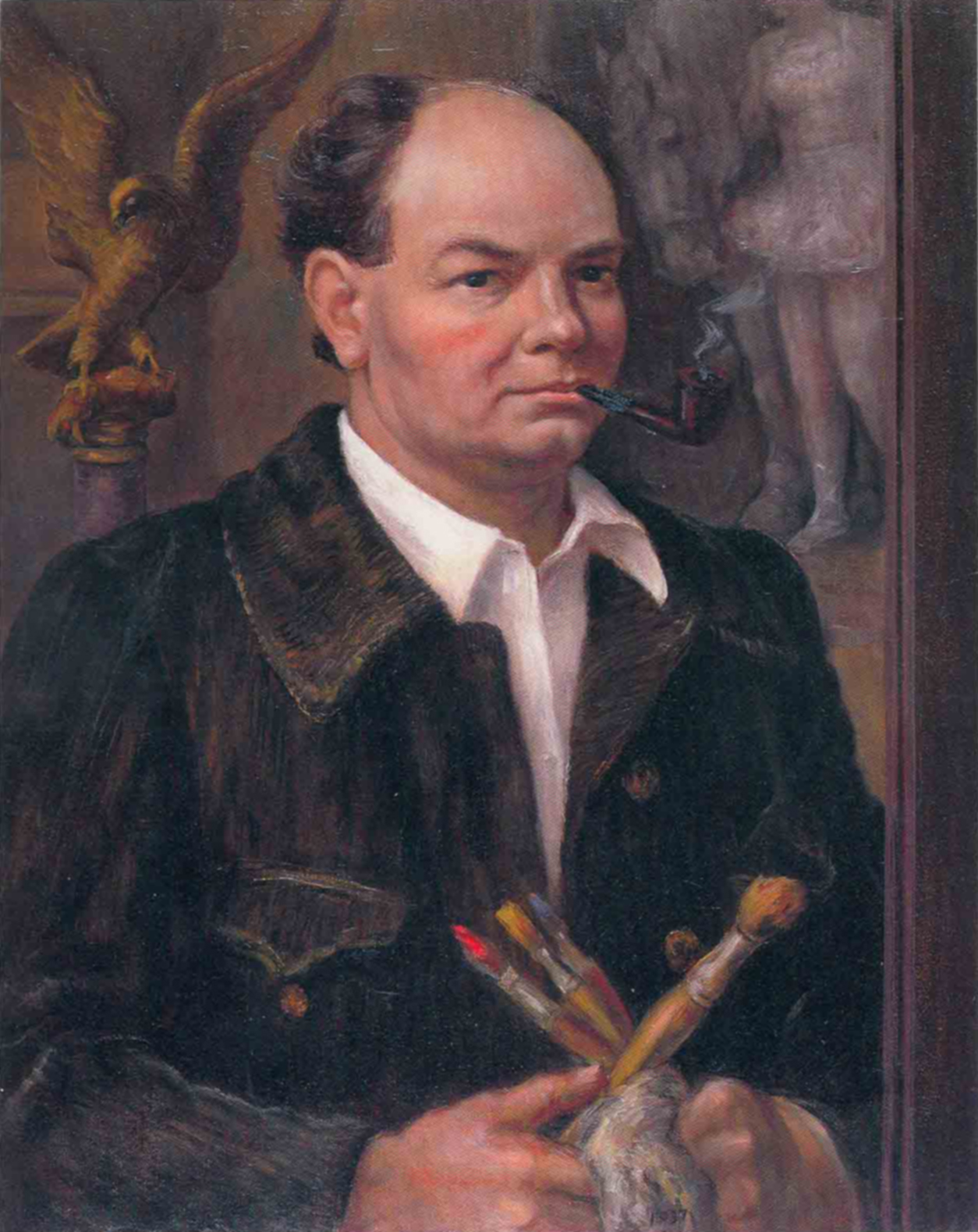
- Self-portrait, 1937
- Born: John Steuart Curry; November 14, 1897; Dunavant, Kansas, US
- Died: August 29, 1946 (aged 48); Madison, Wisconsin, US
- Known for: Painting
- Notable work: Baptism in Kansas (1928), Tornado over Kansas (1929), Tragic Prelude (1937–1942)
- Movement: Regionalism

John Steuart Curry (November 14, 1897 – August 29, 1946) was an American painter whose career spanned the years from 1924 until his death. He was noted for his paintings depicting rural life in his home state, Kansas. Along with Thomas Hart Benton and Grant Wood, he was hailed as one of the three great painters of American Regionalism of the first half of the twentieth century. Curry's artistic production was varied, including paintings, book illustrations, prints, and posters.

Curry was Kansas's best-known painter, but his works were not popular with Kansans, who felt that he did not portray the state positively. Curry's paintings often depicted farm life and animals, tornadoes, prairie fires, and the violent Bleeding Kansas period (featuring abolitionist John Brown, who at the time was derided as a fanatical traitor) – subjects that Kansans did not want to be representative of the state. Curry was commissioned to create murals for the Kansas State Capitol, and he completed two: Kansas Pastoral, and his most famous and controversial work, Tragic Prelude, which he considered his greatest. Reaction was so negative that the Kansas Legislature passed a measure to keep them, or future works of his, from being hung on the capitol walls. As a result, Curry did not sign the works, which were not hung during his lifetime. He left Topeka in disgust; his planned eight smaller murals for the Capitol rotunda on the first floor never went beyond sketches, now held by the Kansas Museum of History.

Curry's works were painted with movement, which was conveyed by the free brush work and energized forms that characterized his style. His control over brushstrokes created excited emotions such as fear and despair in his paintings. His fellow Regionalists, who also painted action and movement, influenced Curry's style.

== Biography ==
Curry was born on a farm in Dunavant, Kansas, November 14, 1897; the house has been moved to the Jefferson County Kansas Historical Society's Old Jefferson Town in Oskaloosa His boyhood home is now a museum and living memorial to him and his art. He was the eldest of five children to parents Thomas Smith Curry and Margaret Steuart Curry. Despite living on a Midwestern farm, both of Curry's parents were college educated and had even visited Europe for their honeymoon. Curry's early life consisted of caring for the animals on the farm, attending the nearby high school and excelling in athletics. His childhood home was filled with many reproductions of Peter Paul Rubens and Gustave Doré, and these artists' styles played a significant role in crafting Curry's own style.

His family was very religious, as were most people in Dunavant. Curry was encouraged to paint animals around the farm, and at the age of twelve he had his first art lesson. In 1916 he entered the Kansas City Art Institute, but after only a month there he transferred to the Art Institute of Chicago, where he stayed for two years. In 1918 he attended Geneva College in Beaver Falls, Pennsylvania. After he graduated, Curry worked as an illustrator from 1921 to 1926. He worked for several magazines, including Boys' Life, St. Nicholas Magazine, The Country Gentleman, and The Saturday Evening Post.

In 1926, Curry spent a year in Paris studying the works of Gustave Courbet and Honoré Daumier, as well as the color techniques of Titian and Rubens. After his return to the United States he settled in New York City and married Clara Derrick; shortly thereafter, they moved to an artists' colony in Westport, Connecticut. Clara died in June 1932 and for the next two years Curry devoted his time to working in his studio. He traveled briefly with the Ringling Brothers Circus and during his time with them created his painting The Flying Cadonas. He remarried in 1934 to Kathleen Gould.

In 1936, Curry was appointed as the first artist-in-residence at the College of Agriculture of the University of Wisconsin, which built him a small studio. He had no classes to teach nor any specific duties; he was free to travel throughout the state and promote art in farming communities by providing personal instruction to students. As seen later, the experience turned Curry into a conservationist, especially concerned with Kansas's man-made ecological disaster, the plowing that produced horrible erosion in Kansas, along with Dust Bowl storms.

The same year he was commissioned to paint a mural for the Department of Justice Building and Main Interior Building in Washington. In 1937 he was elected into the National Academy of Design as an Associate Member, and became a full Academician in 1943. This was followed with what might have been the crown of his career, a commission to paint murals on Kansas topics for the Kansas State Capitol at Topeka, on which abortive project see below.

Curry continued to work at the University of Wisconsin until he died of a heart attack in Madison in 1946, at the age of 48.

== Curry and regionalistic art ==
Curry was one of the three great painters of American regionalistic art; the others were Thomas Hart Benton and Grant Wood. All three were from the Midwest, west of the Mississippi: Wood from Iowa, Benton from Missouri, and Curry from Kansas. Their art presents a nostalgic look at rural life in the American heartland. Regionalism was essentially a revolt against at least one major evil of the Industrial Revolution: centralization.

Centralization of manufacturing permitted mass production, with efficient factories and assembly-line production. This reduced the cost of manufactured goods, but at the expense of regional or local variety and initiative. The Wall Street Crash of 1929 and the subsequent Great Depression demonstrated the limitations and failures of capitalism. Rugged depictions of regional, independent life in wide-open spaces provided an alternative. As put by Meyer Schapiro, "Regionalism obscured the crucial forces of history, as defined by Marx, and provided entertaining distractions from the realities facing oppressed people."

In contrast with Wood, who lived in Iowa, and Benton in Missouri, Curry did not live in Kansas as an adult. As seen by Curry, nostalgia for rural Kansan life ignored its shortcomings: tornados, prairie fires, dust storms, plagues of insects, and life-threatening floods. The depiction of the same in his paintings had as consequence the reservations some Kansans felt about seeing him, without qualification, as Kansas's great painter. In fact, as he well knew, his works did not sell in Kansas.

The University of Wisconsin hired him in 1936 as artist-in-residence, something no Kansas university would do. At Wisconsin, based in the College of Agriculture, Curry became a conservationist. What some Kansans found particularly offensive was his stated plan to portray the tragedy of soil erosion in one of his planned murals for the Kansas Capitol, providing a "significant warning" to Kansas farmers that they had brought on an ecological disaster. He was surprised when these plans met with local resentment.

== Curry and Wisconsin ==
John Curry wanted to come home to Kansas last year [1935], tried to get some sort of a status in some Kansas college. Hard times and one thing or another kept him out. His heart turned back to Kansas and much good it did him. He wanted to honor the state by coming here to live but 'there was no room at the inn.' So John Curry has gone to Wisconsin State university [the University of Wisconsin] where they have provided a job for him and where he is known as 'an [artist] in residence.' They have built him a small studio on the campus and have turned him loose without much schedule and are making him an influence rather than an instructor. He teaches little and talks a lot, paints when he wants to, makes what he can on the side, and gets $4,000 a year [equivalent to $92,806 in 2025] as a salary. Wisconsin will reap the seed of his genius which was sown in Kansas.

— William Allen White

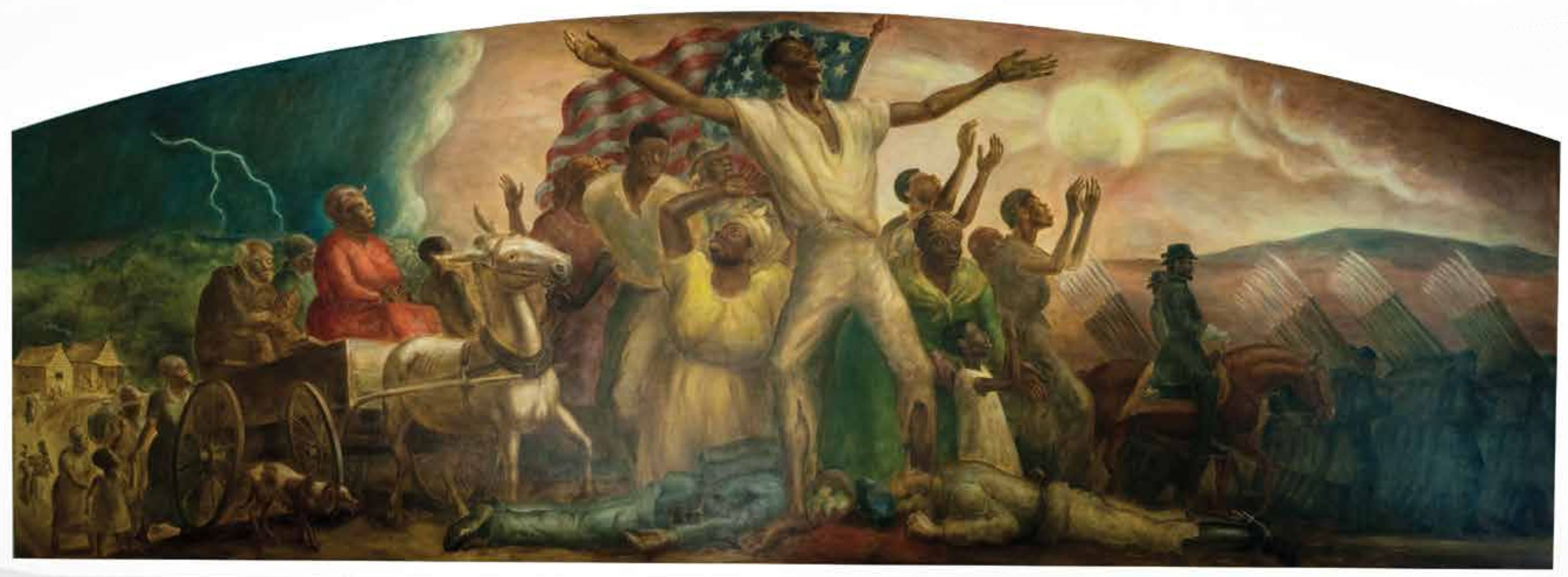
Freeing of the Slaves, by John Steuart Curry. The Union Army, marching through, has just delivered the Emancipation Proclamation. Reading Room, Law Library, University of Wisconsin–Madison.

Curry was thought of in his day as the great Kansas painter, and it was no secret that he wanted to paint murals for Kansas; he confirmed this to a reporter. However, his relationship with Kansas was complicated. He lived in Connecticut and declined repeated suggestions that he move back to his home state; instead, he moved to Wisconsin when its university offered him in 1936 what no Kansas institution would: a position as artist-in-residence. He remained there until his death in 1946. While at Wisconsin he completed in 1942 a 37 feet (11 m) by 14 feet (4.3 m) mural on the Emancipation Proclamation, titled Freeing of the Slaves. It was originally intended, in 1936, for the new U.S. Department of Justice Building, but sketches were rejected by federal officials, who told Curry that they feared that “serious difficulties...might arise as a result of the racial implications of the subject matter.” Curry painted two other murals in that building, Movement of the Population Westward and Law versus Mob Rule. However, the design caught the attention of Wisconsin Law School dean Lloyd K. Garrison, great-grandson of the famous abolitionist Wm. Lloyd Garrison, who had it installed in the Reading Room of the new Law School library.

== Curry and Kansas ==
In his many Kansas-themed works, he wanted to present a "personal view" of Kansas history. "I want to picture what I feel about my native state." In preparation for the crowning project of his career, the Kansas Capitol murals, he spent several days in the Kansas Historical Society and the Topeka Public Library studying Kansas history. As he put it, he wanted to "wreak good" upon Kansas.

Curry painted Kansas as he saw it, warts and all. His planned pieces for the first-floor rotunda of the Kansas Capitol, which never got beyond preliminary sketches, included one on conservation and erosion. Curry expressed the view of the professors in the College of Agriculture, that Kansas farmers' poor soil management caused the erosion and dust storms of 1930s Kansas.

This displeased many Kansans, who did not want soil erosion, or the alleged errors of Kansas farmers, in their Capitol. Furthermore, John Brown was a convicted traitor, and in the opinion of many, a kook. The opposition grew so bitter that Curry abandoned his great Kansas Capitol project in disgust. He refused to sign the two works completed or allow them to be hung, as he said they were intended to be seen as part of a group. They were hung in the Capitol after his death.

=== Baptism in Kansas ===
In August 1928, Curry painted Baptism in Kansas, which was exhibited at the Corcoran Gallery in Washington, D.C., and met with almost instant success. The painting was praised in the New York Times and earned Curry the attention of Mrs. Gertrude Vanderbilt Whitney. In 1931 Mrs. Vanderbilt Whitney purchased the painting for the Whitney Museum of American Art in New York City, thus establishing him as a major artist.

Baptism in Kansas reflected the religious sects that held open-air baptisms. These popular religious groups were part of the scene of rural life that Curry saw in Kansas. He presents the scene with reverence.

No well-known Baptismal representations by old world masters employ the unique compositional layout that Curry favors. Curry's painting was a shock to Easterners who would have never associated a baptism with full immersion or with a barnyard setting, but Curry painted what he was familiar with, as Lawrence Shmeckebrier said he "saw this scene as conceived and executed with sincere reverence and understanding of one who had lived it." Curry's religious painting is therefore an observance rather than a satire on religious fundamentalism.

=== Tornado over Kansas ===
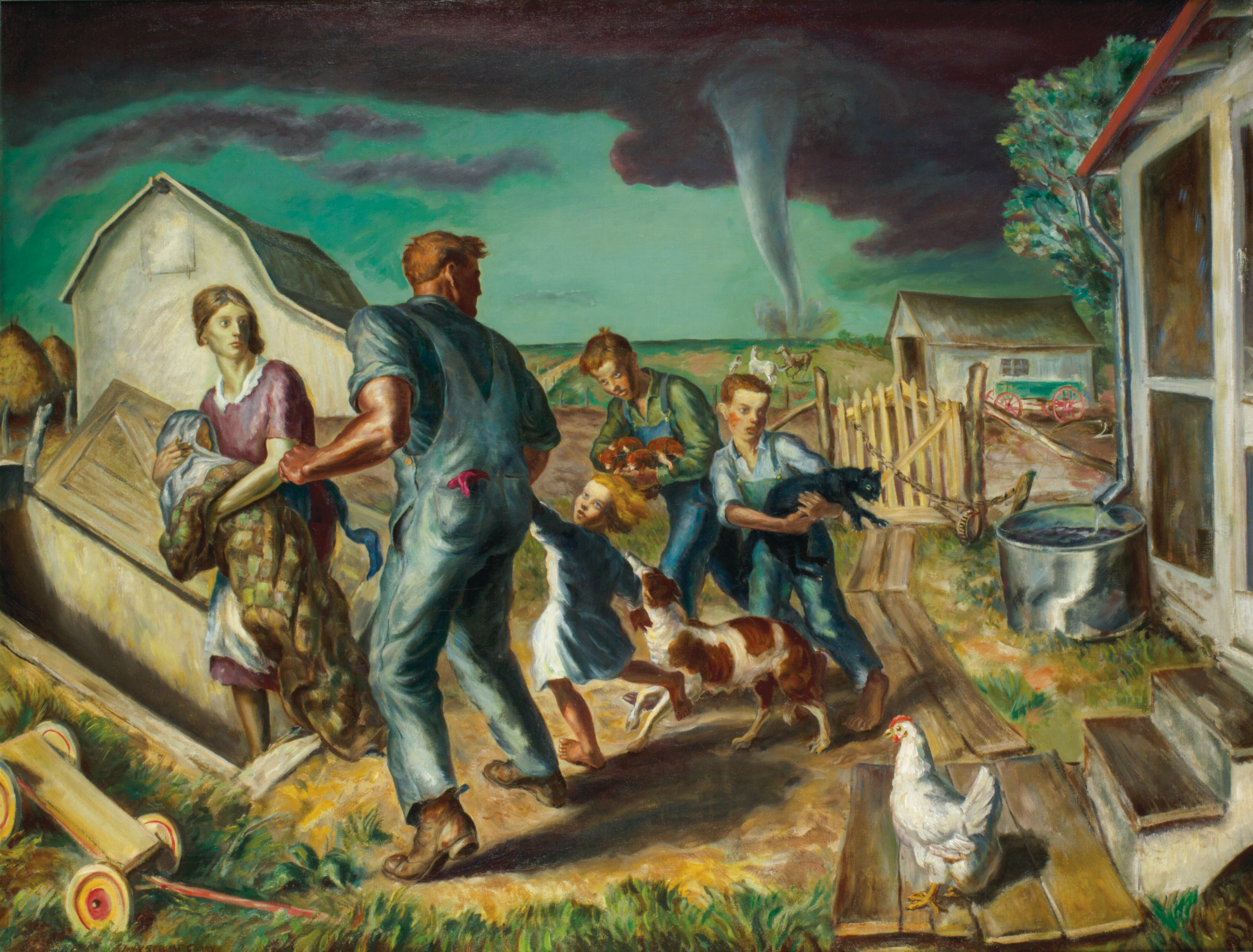
Tornado over Kansas

Under Mrs. Whitney's patronage Curry painted Tornado over Kansas, which depicts a farmer facing an approaching tornado while he and his wife help the family and animals into the tornado shelter. The painting was unveiled in 1929 just before the Wall Street Crash in October and provided those in the city with the romance of man versus nature themes. Typical of Curry's work of the 1930s, he depicted scenes of labor, family, and land, in order to demonstrate peace, struggle, and perseverance that he had come to believe was the essence of American life, the spirit of Kansas.

=== Kansas Pastoral ===
Kansas Pastoral is the first of two murals completed for the Kansas Capitol. It presents a fictional agrarian utopia. The farmer is at leisure; the farm, its crops, and its animals are marvels of order, and seem to run themselves. The manual labor of the farm woman is no longer needed, and she can devote herself to the home.

=== Tragic Prelude ===
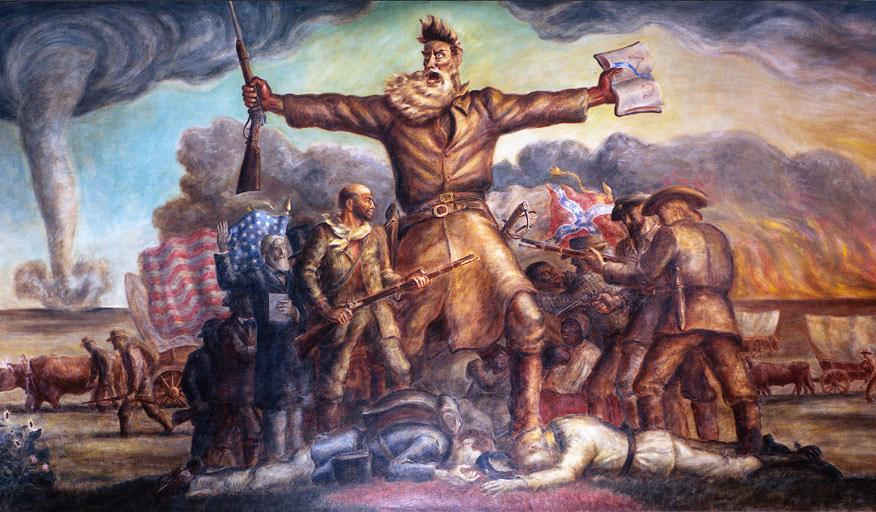
Tragic Prelude

Tragic Prelude presents a visual history of Kansas: the first Europeans, Juan de Padilla and Coronado, followed by a plainsman hunting buffalos, and finally the Bleeding Kansas period of 1854–1861. During this period, when Kansas was the focus of national attention like no time before or since, "old" John Brown, believing he was doing the Lord's work, and well-armed, led anti-slavery settlers in resisting, with violence if unfortunately necessary, the attempts to make Kansas a slave state. Kansas' status was not resolved until the beginning of the Civil War, when six slave states had seceded, and it could come into the Union as a free state.

Brown's role during the Bleeding Kansas period—he was also an Underground Railroad conductor—was not widely remembered outside of Kansas. However, his name was familiar to anyone who had had a course in American history, as he was widely believed to have helped cause the Civil War, and on purpose, with his raid on the federal arsenal in Harpers Ferry, Virginia (since 1863, West Virginia). He was quickly convicted of treason against the Commonwealth of Virginia, murder, and fomenting a slave insurrection, and hung. "John Brown's Body" was the marching song of Union soldiers.

Tragic Prelude puts Brown in front of the troops killing each other. In the background, approaching tornado and prairie fires suggest the calamity, the Civil War, that was fast approaching, and that Brown seemed to be calling for.

The painting produced a negative reaction in advance of its being hung. (It was not hung until after Curry's death.) John Brown, convicted of treason against the Commonwealth of Virginia, was not someone most Kansans felt proud of, nor was the Bleeding Kansas period as a whole. Adding to public consternation was Curry's plan to portray ruinous soil erosion, in Kansas a very controversial and political topic, in another mural. The Legislature could not fire Curry since he was being paid out of funds newspaper editors raised from the public. However, they withdrew permission for Curry's works to be hung in the Capitol.

This was devastating to Curry. He left Kansas in disgust and refused to sign the two murals he did complete, saying that they could not be understood in isolation.

Over time, Tragic Prelude has become by far Curry's most famous work. It is the only work of Curry's to have a book devoted solely to it, and is also well known as the source material for the album cover of rock band Kansas' 1974 debut record.

== Political art ==
Curry's art, in general, was conservative in political content. He believed that art was for the common person. He did not believe in political propaganda, particularly the Marxist kind that Diego Rivera popularized in the 1930s. Curry avoided exploiting the controversial subjects in which Rivera became involved because he did not believe they added any artistic quality to his work. However, Curry did create a few political sketches or studies, but these were never expanded on for larger projects. Rather, he enjoyed observing public events and capturing them on paper.

Curry's few semi-political paintings evolved out of his personal experiences rather than created as a display of social commentary. The Return of Private Davis, completed in 1940, was first witnessed near his home in 1918, and a similar study was made in France during 1926. Schmeckebier relates this painting to the ceremony of baptism: "a rural religious ceremony whose tragedy is intensified by the realization that this son of the fresh green Kansas prairies was sacrificed on a battlefield whose ideological remoteness was as dramatic as its geographical makeup." The painting does not express a political spectacle, rather Curry's personal feelings. Conversely, Parade to War depicts departing soldiers rather than the return of a victim of war.

Along with war scenes, Curry also produced manhunt and fugitive subjects. These ideas were inspired by remembrances from his own childhood, but were also observed from publicized events during the early 1930s. The Lindbergh kidnapping and John Dillinger's crime spree were well known and public deaths such as lynchings were often the result of such crimes. In addition, the plight of black male victims of lynching became a focus of attention. Curry's painting, The Fugitive, showing a black man hiding from a mob, appeared in a 1935 exhibition, "An Art Commentary on Lynching," organized in support of national anti-lynching legislation (which never passed; anti-lynching legislation was only passed at the federal level in 2022, long after President Franklin Roosevelt refused to sign the Anti-Lynching Bill of 1937, also known as the Gavagan-Wagner Act). These earlier political works would influence later Curry's mural work in the Department of Justice Building. Located "above the entrance to the Justice Department library" is Curry's painting, Law vs. Mob Rule in which a judge in black robes protects a man who has collapsed on the courthouse steps from a lynch mob.

== Reactions and legacy ==
Despite popularity in the rest of the country, Curry's works did not find favor in Kansas. He was taken as ridiculing the worst aspects of the state. Kansans felt the inclusion of outdoor baptisms and tornadoes perpetuated negative stereotypes about the state. When these paintings were displayed in New York galleries many Kansans felt belittled. However, the New York public was fascinated by Curry's paintings. Curry's paintings were entertaining and easy to grasp, and allowed viewers to see a more primitive, isolated, non-commercial version of America.

John Steuart Curry never forgot that he came off a Kansas farm, that his folks were plain Kansas folks whose lives were spent with the plain, simple, elemental things of the earth and sky. His art and the meanings of his art were never cut loose from this background. To the end his ideal audience was a Kansas audience. Dealing with what that audience experienced and knew about, John wanted its appreciation more than anything else. He didn't get it.

In 1992, the Kansas Legislature apologized for its treatment of Curry and purchased the drawings related to his murals.

== List of art works ==
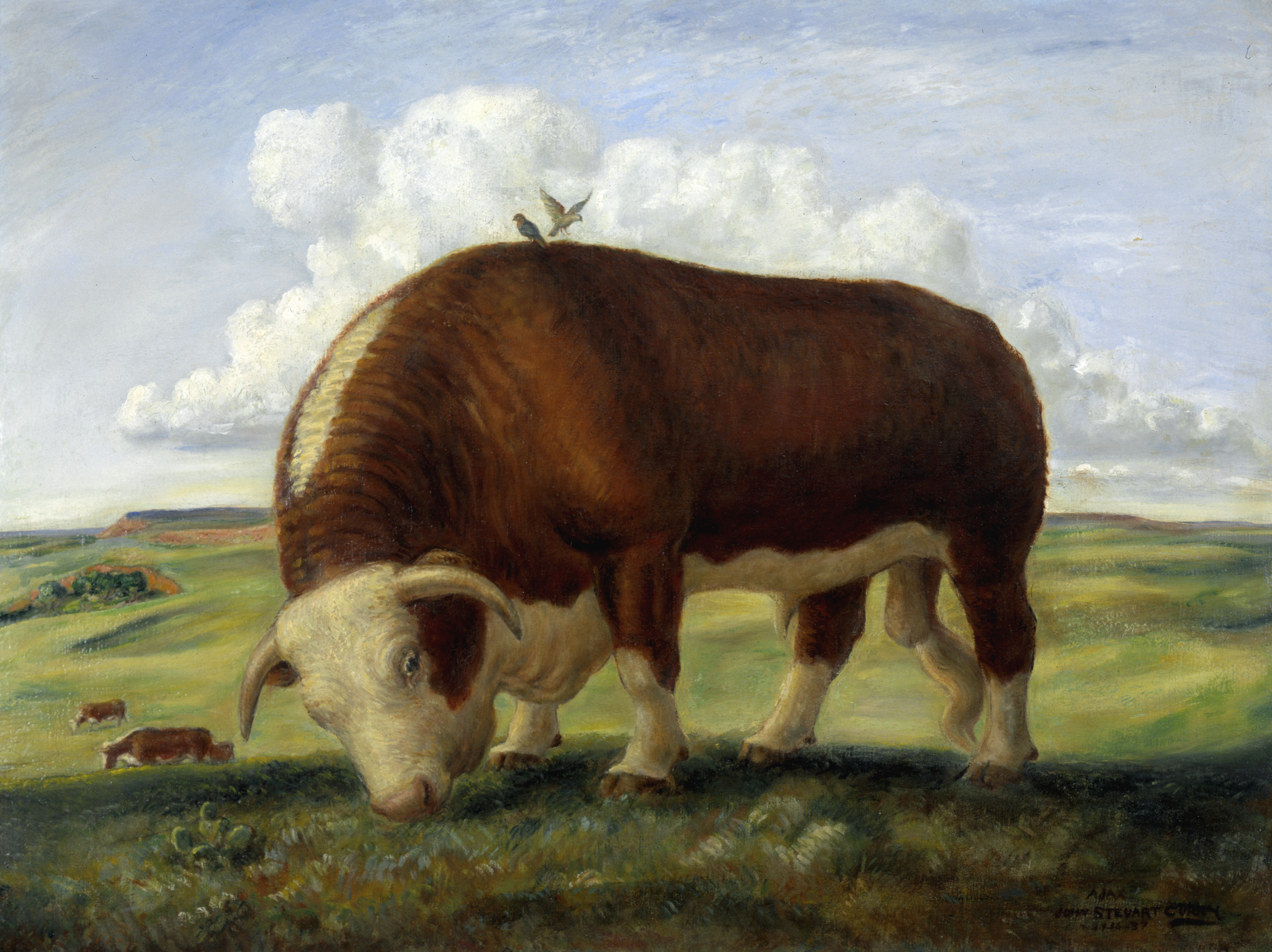
Ajax

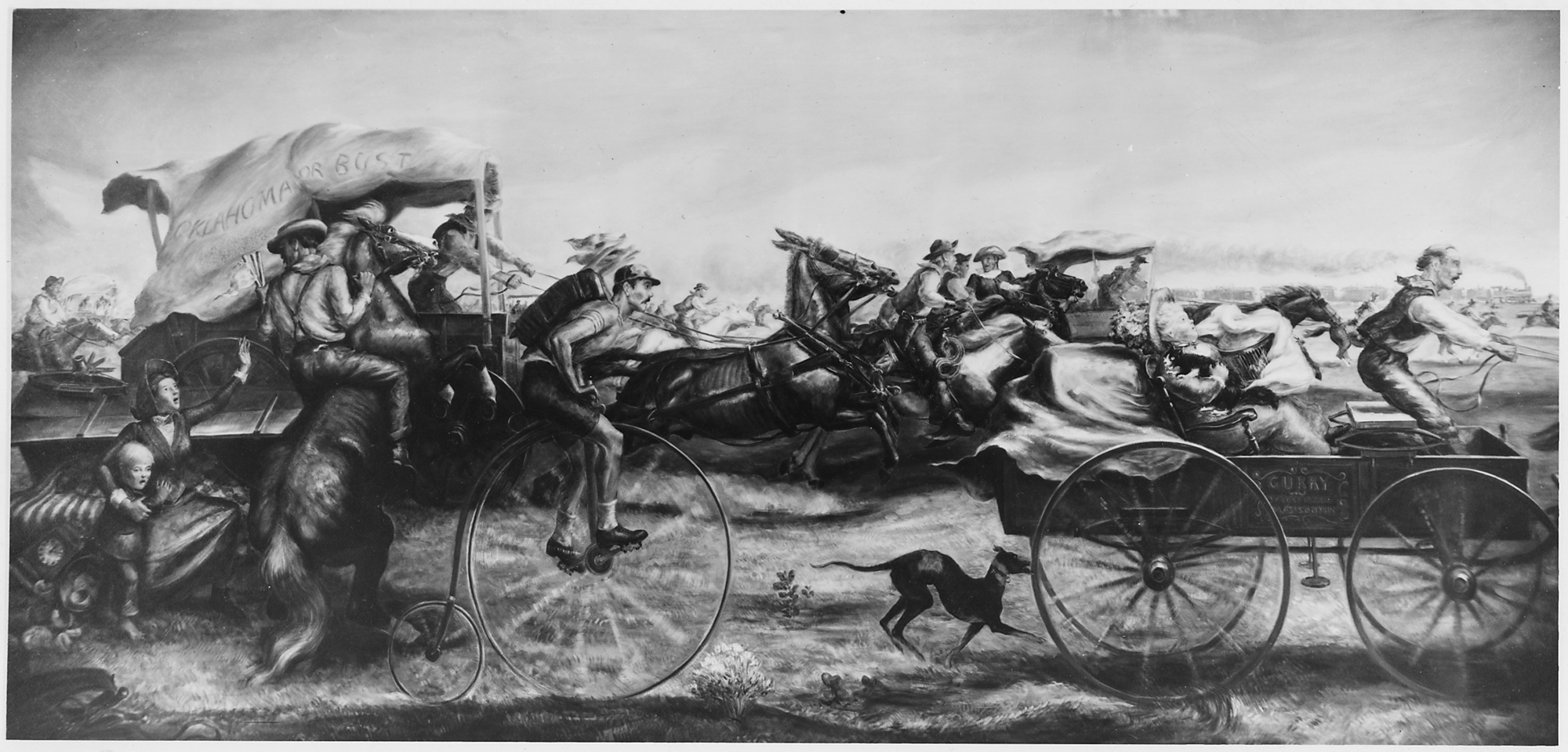
The Oklahoma Land Rush, April 22, 1889

This is a list of some of Curry's most notable works, arranged by date.

- Baptism in Kansas, oil on canvas, 1928, Whitney Museum of American Art, New York City.
- The Old Folks (Mother and Father), oil on canvas, 1929, Cincinnati Art Museum, Cincinnati, OH.
- The Roadworkers Camp, oil on canvas, 1929, F.M. Hall Collection, University of Nebraska, Lincoln.
- Storm Over Lake Otsego, oil on canvas, 1929, collection of Mrs. Polly Thayer Starr, Boston, Massachusetts.
- Tornado over Kansas, oil on canvas, 1929, Muskegon Museum of Art, Muskegon, Michigan.
- State Fair, oil on canvas, 1929, Huntington Library, San Marino, CA.
- Hogs Killing a Snake, oil on canvas, c.1930, Art Institute of Chicago.
- The Medicine Man, oil on canvas, 1931, collection of William Benton, Chicago, Illinois.
- Spring Shower, oil on canvas, 1931, Metropolitan Museum of Art, New York City.
- The Flying Cadonas, oil and tempera on panel, 1932, Whitney Museum of American Art, New York City.
- The Runaway, oil on canvas, 1932, collection of Bryn Mawr College, Bryn Mawr, Pennsylvania.
- The Line Storm, oil and tempera on panel, 1934, collection of Sidney Howard, New York.
- Corn, oil on canvas, 1935, Wichita Art Museum, Wichita, Kansas.
- Ajax, oil on canvas, 1936–37, Smithsonian American Art Museum, Washington, D.C.
- The Oklahoma Land Rush, April 22, 1889, commissioned 1937, installed 1939
- Tragic Prelude, 1937–1942, Kansas State Capitol
- Madison Landscape, oil and tempera on canvas, 1941, Madison Museum of Contemporary Art, Madison, WI

== Exhibitions ==
- "Weathering the storm," May 23, - September 2, 2024, Muskegon Museum of Art, Muskegon, Michigan.
- "A Celebration of Rural America," September 9, – October 28, 2007, Danville Museum of Fine Arts and History, Danville, Virginia.
- "Collective Images: the sketchbooks of John Steuart Curry," February 23, – May 5, 2002, Worcester Art Museum, Worcester, Massachusetts.
- "Illusions of Eden: Visions of the American Heartland," February 18, – April 30, 2000, Columbus Museum of Art, Columbus, Ohio.
- "The American Century: Art & Culture 1900–2000," April 23, 1999, Whitney Museum of American Art, New York, New York.
- "John Steuart Curry: Inventing the Middle West," June 13, – August 30, 1998, M. H. de Young Memorial Museum, San Francisco, California.

== Archival material ==
The Kansas Historical Society has Curry's preliminary sketches for the State Capitol murals.
