= The Plainsman Museum =

American museum in Nebraska

Coordinates: 40°51′32″N 97°59′46″W

The Plainsman Museum is a museum located in Aurora, Nebraska, focusing on the history of the settlers and their descendants in the central Nebraska plains region. It was officially dedicated on July 4, 1976, as a part of the American national bicentennial, and consists of a complex of buildings housing various items demonstrating the everyday life of the plains settlers, along with agricultural history.

== Facilities ==
The main center for the museum is the Plainsman Building which holds the bulk of the museum's collections. Inside are a replica sod house and log cabin, along with a reproduction miniaturized Main Street where visitors can look upon late 19th and early 20th century life. Shops include a hardware store, a doctor's office, a town jail, a bar and a bank. Also within this building are further collections of local as well as historic interest.

The Agricultural Building, located directly behind the Plainsman Building to the east was built in 1986 and houses an actual homestead, around which the building was constructed. It includes a large collection of farm machinery including horse-drawn implements such as plows and threshers, an early steam-powered tractor, various tractors leading from the 1920s into the present day and a collection of vintage automobiles from the 1920s and 30s.

The Fairview School, a one-room schoolhouse, was moved to the museum in 1981 and displays authentic 19th century educational tools and desks. It, too, is located behind the Plainsman Building.

A 19th century home sits across from the Fairview School, called the Bates House. It is dedicated to its former resident, Gen. Delevan Bates a Medal of Honor winner of the American Civil War, and his wife Lana. The Bates were instrumental in the establishment of Hamilton County, NE. The home was moved to the museum grounds in 1993.

A blacksmith shop, also moved to the property, serves as a demonstration place during events and school trips.

Most recently, a retired Burlington Northern Railroad caboose was moved to the property and is undergoing restoration.
