= List of artwork by John Steuart Curry =

This page explores the notable artwork by John Steuart Curry. During Curry's lifetime he was prolific in a number of mediums, including painting, mural work, and illustrations. The page captures the most notable works, alongside many of his other works and describes their publication context.

A list begins each section talking about the works contained within that medium or genre and are sorted by date. Following each list is a discussion of the context in which that work was produced. Currently the list is incomplete and does not include images of the individual pieces of artwork because much of it is still under copyright. The references on each citation for works links to websites for the organization holding the collection, or, if not available, links to website depicting the image.

== Paintings ==
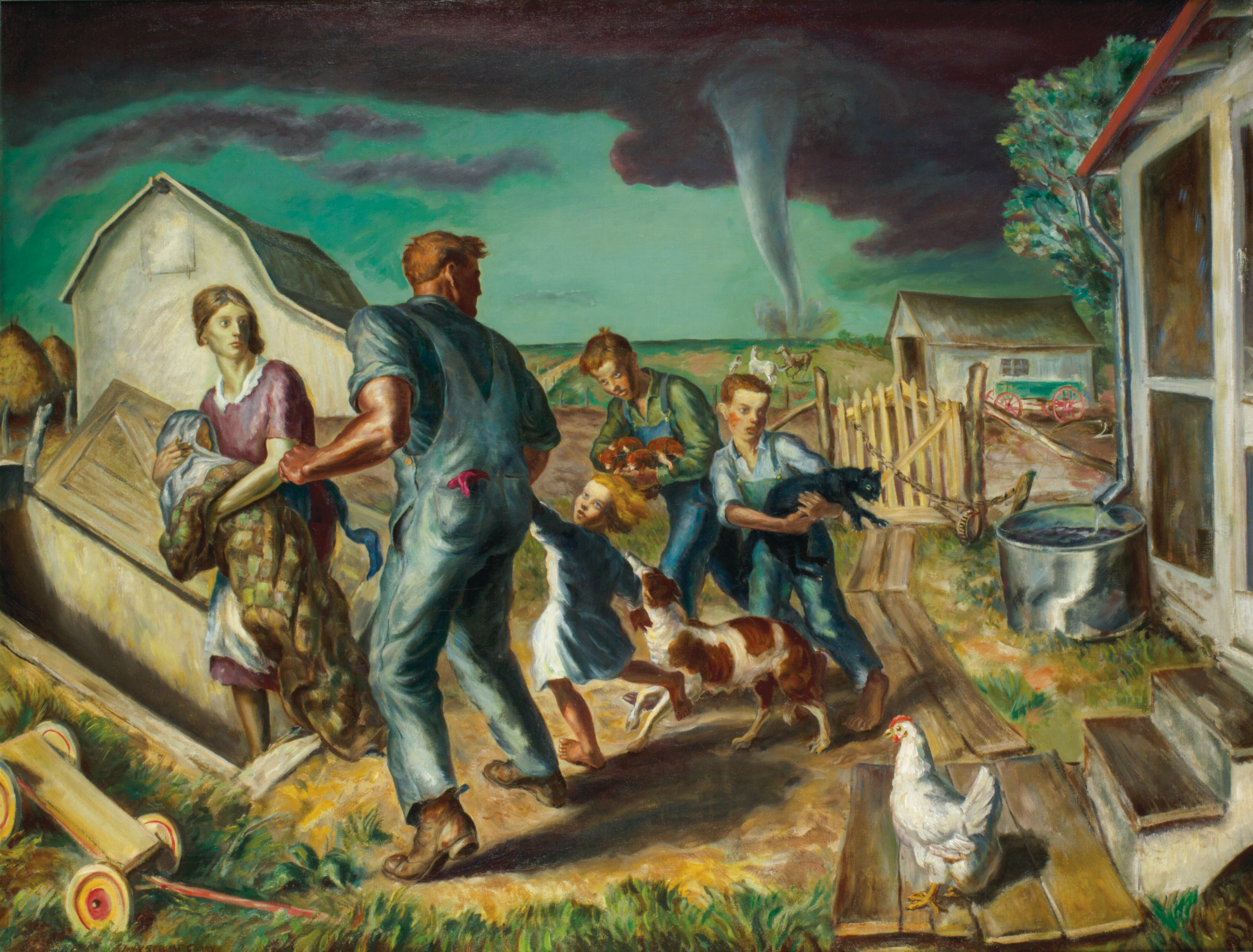
Tornado over Kansas, 1929

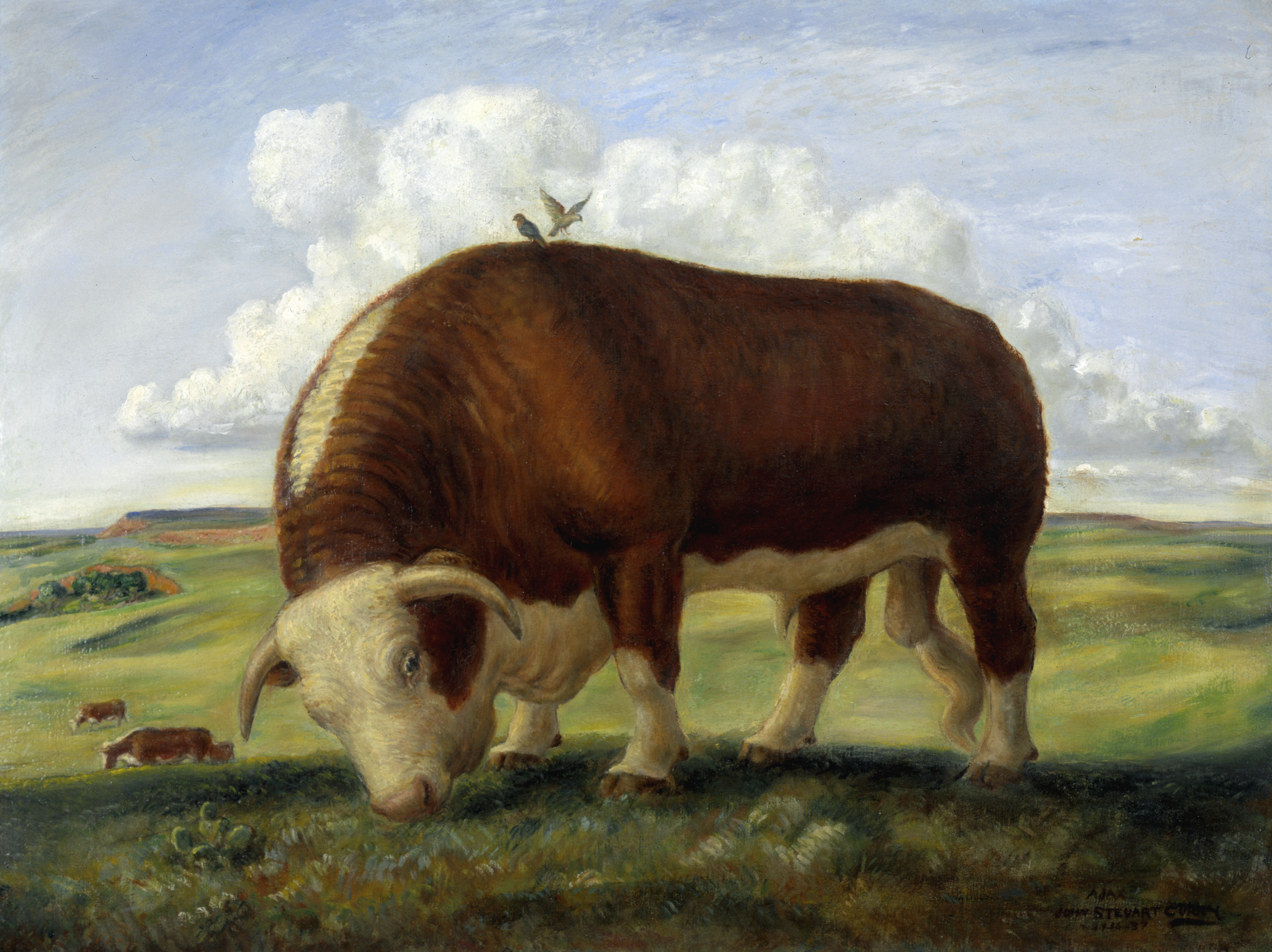
Ajax, 1936–37

- Baptism in Kansas, 1928, oil on canvas, Whitney Museum of American Art, New York City
- The Old Folks (Mother and Father), 1929, oil on canvas, Cincinnati Art Museum, Cincinnati, OH
- The Roadworkers Camp, 1929, oil on canvas, F.M. Hall Collection, University of Nebraska–Lincoln
- Storm Over Lake Otsego, 1929, oil on canvas, Museum of Fine Arts, Boston
- Tornado over Kansas, 1929, oil on canvas, Muskegon Museum of Art, MI
- State Fair, oil on canvas, 1929, Huntington Library, San Marino, CA
- The Medicine Man, 1931, oil on canvas, collection of William Benton, Chicago, IL
- The Manhunt, 1931, oil on canvas, Joslyn Art Museum, Omaha, NE
- The Flying Cadonas, 1932, oil and tempera on panel, Whitney Museum of American Art, New York City
- The Line Storm, 1934, oil and tempera on panel, collection of Sidney Howard, New York
- Kansas Cornfield, 1935, oil on canvas, Wichita Art Museum, KS
- Ajax, oil on canvas, 1936–37, Smithsonian American Art Museum, Washington, DC
- Wisconsin Landscape, 1938–39, oil on canvas, Metropolitan Museum of Art, New York City
- Madison Landscape, 1941, oil and tempera on canvas, Madison Museum of Contemporary Art, Madison, WI

== Murals ==
- Westward Movement: Justice of the Plains and Law Versus Mob Rule, 1935, oil on canvas, Department of Justice, Washington, DC
- The Oklahoma Land Rush, April 22, 1889, and The Homestead, 1938, oil on canvas, Department of the Interior, Washington, DC
- Tragic Prelude and Kansas Pasture, 1937–42, oil and tempera on canvas, Kansas Statehouse, Topeka

=== Department of the Interior murals ===
Curry's murals at the Stewart Lee Udall Department of the Interior Building in Washington D.C. — The Homestead and The Oklahoma Land Rush — were commissioned by the Treasury Section of Painting and Sculpture. They were painted in oil and tempera on canvas between 1937 and 1939. The two murals depict events of the time period, the Homestead Acts and the Oklahoma Land Run of 1889. Early sketches of figures and ideas are held by archives located at the Marianna Kistler Beach Museum of Art at Kansas State University.

==== The Homestead ====
The Homestead

This mural is nine foot by 19 feet eight inch. It represents a homestead with the typical features that make up its ideal of blessed peace, happiness, and potential prosperity of ensuring rural life. The Homestead features a mother and her daughter paring potatoes near a small garden for the family meal. A young son holds the fence posts while his father drives them into the ground. An older sister drives the wagon full of spikes while she also cares for the youngest child. Each member of the family is actively working and contributing its energies to the productive whole. Near the bottom left of the mural, roosters, chicks, and chickens peck and feed near the foreground garden as bountiful reminders of their capacity to provide this frontier family with eggs.

==== The Oklahoma Land Rush ====
The Oklahoma Land Rush, April 22, 1889

two inches taller than its partner painting, this nine feet two inch by 19 feet eight inch mural represents another historical event from the time period. The Oklahoma Land Rush depicts the Westward Migration in the representation of that famous day—twelve o'clock noon on April 22, 1889—when the Oklahoma Territory was opened to homestead settlement and over twenty thousand prospective settlers rushed into the new land to stake their claims. Anxious but looking forward to eventual security, an 1889 pioneer mother, sunbonnet intact, is of importance to the far left foreground of Curry's westward-moving mural. Perched on a broken-down wagon, she clutches her small son while waving and calling out to her certificate-holding husband, who, astride their rearing horse, is to ride on to claim a new farm site. His hellbent competition includes a cyclist riding safety bicycle from the 1880s and an overweight, overdressed lady in a rocking chair. She rolls back in an open wagon driven frantically by her balding husband, and, if nothing else, lends comic relief to balance the anxious sincerity of the mother on the ground.

John Steuart Curry's Oklahoma Land Rush repeated an important theme of the time: history told through the actions of common people. By emphasizing the rush of figures across the land, Curry shared his concern with capturing the energy and vigor of American pioneers.

=== Kansas State Capital murals ===
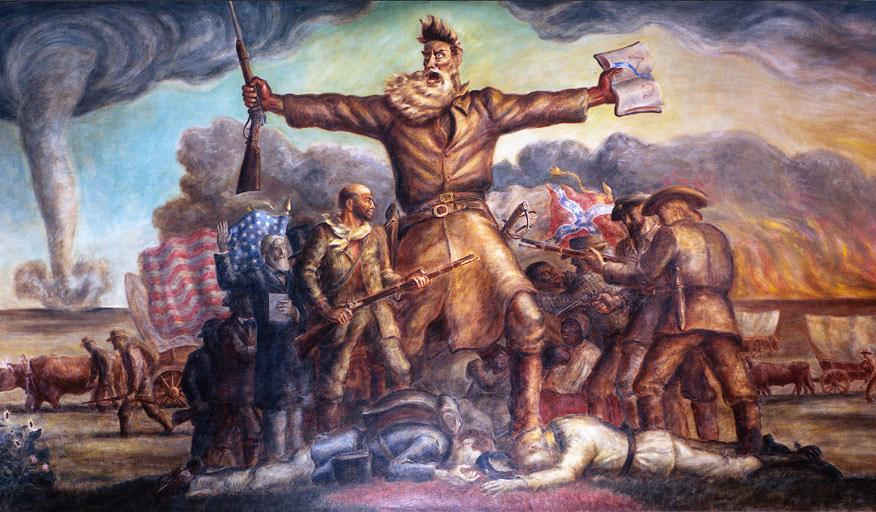
Tragic Prelude, mural by John Steuart Curry, in the Kansas State Capitol

One of Curry's most famous works are the murals designed for the Kansas State Capitol, in Topeka, Kansas. In June 1937, newspaper editors raised money to commission John Steuart Curry (who was the most famous artist in Kansas) to paint murals in the statehouse. Curry's design was divided into three themes: first the Settlement of Kansas, which depicted the conquistadors and the Plainsmen; second the Life of a Homesteader, which would depict John Brown; and third, Pastoral Prosperity which would include scenes of modern Kansas. Curry wanted to be free to express his own ideas regarding the murals: "I have my own ideas about telling the story of pioneers coming into Kansas. I want to paint this war with nature and I want to paint the things I feel as a native Kansan."

Political controversy stalled the completion of the murals. Expensive Italian marble slabs covered the spot in the rotunda where the eight panels depicting scenes from the Life of the Kansas Homesteader were to be painted. The legislative committee refused to move them from the wall to make way for Curry's mural. However, behind the refusal were two real issues with Curry's paintings, the first being that Curry's factual details were incorrect. For instance, "they criticized the tails of his animals calling them not natural-like." In Curry's opinion, those problems could be easily fixed. However, with the next issue the committee had an even stronger objection; and that was the image of Kansan abolitionist John Brown, in front of a crowd of people and a tornado. In particular, the committee objected to the blood on John Brown's hands, the prairie fires, and tornadoes. These inclusions were thought by some to show the state in a negative light because Brown, who was executed in 1859 for treason (leading an abolitionist raid on Harpers Ferry, Virginia), was considered by some to be a traitor and a murderer. Curry tried to explain that while the blood on Brown's hands was not literal, his acts caused bloodshed, and that the tornado was a symbol of the abolitionist's passion. However, the people of Kansas saw its inclusion as a negative statement about bad weather. In his presentation to the people, Curry expressed that he wanted to get into his pictures the irony that is the Kansas people; not a soft, soppy presentation. When rejected, Curry in anger left the finished murals unsigned at his death in 1946. Since Curry's death, his murals have come to be regarded as on par with similar works done by his contemporary Thomas Hart Benton.

== Prints ==
- Manhunt, 1934, lithograph, Figge Art Museum, Davenport, IA
- The Fugitive, 1935, lithograph, Marianna Kistler Beach Museum of Art, Kansas State University, Manhattan
- Elephants, 1936, lithograph, Figge Art Museum, Davenport, IA
- John Brown, 1939, lithograph, Marianna Kistler Beach Museum of Art, Kansas State University, Manhattan
- The Plainsman, 1945, lithograph, Marianna Kistler Beach Museum of Art, Kansas State University, Manhattan

== Illustrations ==
While studying at the School of the Art Institute of Chicago in 1917, Curry wrote home to his parents about his decision to study illustration. He noted his interest in studying with Harvey Dunn who Curry said was “making the illustrators of today." In 1920, Curry met Dunn, and while he did not become one of Dunn’s students the established artist became a mentor, helping Curry further his illustration education and career. Curry began publishing illustrations in 1921 and continued through 1926 when he took a hiatus from illustration, writing “Came to NY to be an illustrator. Was not a brilliant success. Went to Paris and learned something from M. Schoukhareff of the Russian Academy. Learned something, also, from the Louvre and have been trying since to carry out my ideas of how an American should paint."

In 1940 John Curry returned to making illustrations for books and other media, and he contributed to this field until his death in 1946. His last illustrations can be found in John Brown’s Body: A Poem by Stephen Vincent Benét, published by Limited Editions Club in 1948.

My Friend Flicka was originally written as just a short story by Mary O’Hara while she was living on a ranch in Wyoming. It was later requested by the Lippincott Publishing Company of New York that she make it into a novel. It was published in 1941 and John Steuart Curry contributed fifteen drawings for the illustrations. They were rendered in mostly ink with some pencil and conte crayon. He did one picture with watercolor for the title page of the book.

=== Book illustrations ===
- Cooper, James Fenimore. The Prairie. New York: Limited Editions Club, 1940.
- O’Hara, Mary. My Friend Flicka. Philadelphia: Lippincott, 1941.
- Lincoln, Abraham, and Carl Van Doren. Literary Works of Abraham Lincoln. New York: Heritage Press, 1942.
- O’Hara, Mary. Thunderhead. Philadelphia: Lippincott, 1943.
- Crane, Stephen. The Red Badge of Courage. New York: Heritage Press, 1944.
- Emerson, Ralph Waldo. The Essays of Ralph Waldo Emerson. New York: Illustrated Modern Library, 1944.
- Benet, Stephen Vincent. John Brown’s Body: A Poem. New York: Heritage Press, 1948.

=== Magazine illustrations ===
Curry created illustrations for:

- Boys' Life
- St. Nicholas Magazine
- The Country Gentleman
- The Saturday Evening Post

Important illustrations that are now held by art institutions include:

- Hoover and the Flood, 1940, oil on panel, LIFE magazine commission, Original at Morris Museum of Art, August, GA
- Lucky Strike print advertisements for American Tobacco Company, 1941-1947, Originals at Marianna Beach Museum of Art, Kansas State University, Manhattan
- Our Good Earth, Keep It Ours, 1942, for WWII war bond posters, Originals at Marianna Beach Museum of Art, Kansas State University, Manhattan

==== The Country Gentleman ====
In 1941, John Steuart Curry was commissioned by the Associated American Artists to create a painting about tobacco for an illustration in the American agricultural magazine, The Country Gentleman.

==== Lucky Strike ads ====
Along with other regional artists, Curry was commissioned to create advertisements for a Lucky Strike ad campaign that spanned from 1942 to 1944. This campaign associated Luckies with the down-home, folksy look of regional art. The American Tobacco Company did not capitalize on the war or use military themes when advertising for their cigarettes.

Curry only made two Lucky Strike tobacco ads:

- "Grading a Pile of Tobacco After Curing"- The first Lucky Strike ad features a woman wearing a headscarf sorting tobacco leaves.
- "Grading the Lighter Leaf"- This ad depicts a farmer sorting and examining tobacco leaves inside a barn.

There are four original primary sketches of ideas and the layouts for these Lucky Strike ads in the archives located at the Marianna Kistler Beach Museum of Art at Kansas State University.

=== Hoover and the Flood ===
On May 6, 1940, LIFE magazine released Hoover and the Flood: A painting for LIFE, by John Steuart Curry. This editorial was the sixth of eight commissioned installments for LIFE Magazine's American History Series that featured modern American history paintings. John Steuart Curry's Hoover and the Flood painting is an oil on panel and measures 37½ by 63 inches. The painting is currently located at The Morris Museum of Art in Augusta, GA. Curry's LIFE Magazine commission was solely for the reproduction rights to the painting. Since the magazine never intended to purchase Curry's painting there has been little success finding documentation regarding the financial aspects of the commission.

Curry's Hoover and the Flood was created to celebrate the humanitarian and relief efforts of Secretary of Commerce Herbert Hoover before his presidential election in 1928. Curry's painting demonstrates many of the major scenes and events that were associated during the Mississippi Flood of 1927 such as flood waters, National Guardsmen, the Red Cross relief, refugees, stranded farm animals, praying African Americans and a Mississippi riverboat. John Steuart Curry's work often supported the mentalities of the African American population that were common during the first half of the twentieth century. Hoover and the Flood references several of Curry's previous artworks. His use of a centrally positioned African American male figure appears in other works including Freeing of the Slaves (1936), The Fugitive (1924-1936), and Mississippi Noah (1932).

== War art ==
Important pieces of war art include:

- Our Good Earth, 1942, oil on hardboard, Chazen Museum of Art, University of Wisconsin
- Farm is a Battleground, Too, 1943, World War II war bond poster, original at Figge Art Museum, Davenport, IA
- The Surgeon, ca. 1945, conté crayon on paper, War Department commission, Camp Barkeley, TX, US Army medical training, ca. 1945

=== Background ===
The government used posters to advertise as technique during the First World War. The posters bridged a gap between the government and the people by using direct and simple messages. The government’s plan of advertising via posters was to stir the nation into action by engaging its people’s hearts and minds. Quite simply, the posters were meant to inform, influence and guide Americans’ behavior toward a certain political ideology. Because these posters were to be a part of the urban environment, they could be placed anywhere. Moreover, artists were told to use objects that could stand for a whole, like a flag signifying a nation or a bomb meaning war, so that they would not require any text on the poster. No poster text was deemed a more effective and efficient technique of advertising. Specifically, posters were to “tell the truth” because they engaged all Americans and fostered a social movement among Americans. Sympathetic and realistic representations of the common soldier encouraged American nationalism, such that the common lives of persons were made to be heroic during the war. Two different schools of art did work during this time: Regionalists and Social Realist. Both groups of art had vastly different views, but they did share the common idea of the championing the common man. Therefore, if either group was to make art to persuade people it needed to be done in this manner.

Although he openly opposed the possibility of a Second World War, John Steuart Curry's political opinions are not known explicitly. His opinions were a mystery even to his wife. In an interview when asked what Curry's political views were, she told the interviewer that her husband read The Progressive. Matthew Biagell once wrote that "subject matter of an important group of paintings[...]as well as statements that he made, suggest strongly that his interests lay in a liberalism of one sort or another." His opinions of military involvement in Europe were believed to be in step with the majority of Americans at this time. "Isolationism may have been most pronounced in the landlocked Midwest, but Americans of both sexes, of all ages, religions, and political persuasions, from all ethnic groups and all religions, shared in the postwar years a feeling of apathy toward Europe, not to mention the rest of the wretchedly quarrelsome world, that bordered on disgust." Curry was frustrated by the possibility of war. He saw the war only as a setback in the progress the nation had made since that last world war, and thus ending the progress made in the world of art. Curry warned that the entrance into another world war would kill the renaissance that he had seen reborn after the WWI: "After the First World War there began a splendid resurgence in Art in America, and we are in the midst of this movement now--but war will kill it before it can reach its flowering." Curry had shown his dread of the coming war through his painting The Light of the World which depicted onlookers gazing at a coming storm. It wasn't until after the attack on Pearl Harbor, December 7, 1941, which caused the shift in American opinion, that inspired a change in Curry's support of the war. Curry was faced with the dilemma on how to make his work matter. He had the desire to reach a broader audience of people, and for the first time in Curry's career, he expressed a desire to utilize his talents in support of American troops. In 1942, he finished his first work in support of a war. Sponsored by Abbott Laboratories to produce government sanctioned war propaganda, Curry finished his first work in support of any war effort. He submitted an oil titled Our Good Earth to be used in publications.

=== Our Good Earth ===
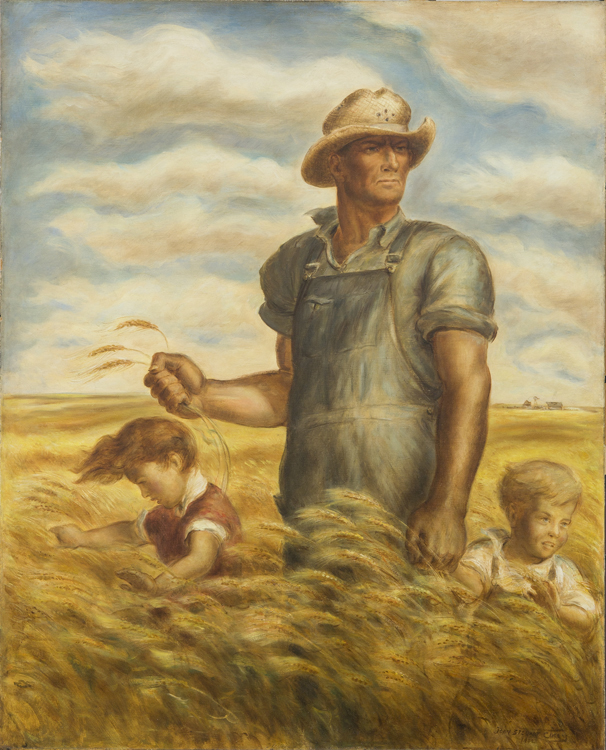
Our Good Earth: painted version from 1942, in the collection of the Chazen Museum of Art.

Our Good Earth is a painting and war poster by Curry that highlights the symbolic importance of the heartland to the American war effort. When commissioned to do war art, Reeves Lewenthal, director of Associated American Artists gallery, tried suggesting possible subjects for John Steuart Curry's new sponsorship: "Perhaps you can do a heroic figure of a soldier guarding over or fighting for the preservation of all those benefits and advantages we enjoy in our democracy; or perhaps, could be fighting for the preservation of our peaceful, fertile farmlands, can be effectively portrayed in the background; or, perhaps, shadows of out former hero soldiers can drift into the distance behind this forceful foreground figure.... Then again, you might do a nurse-or a flyer-or a marine-or a sailor-in some symbolic composition." But Curry had other ideas when he responded with: "...it seems very doubtful whether it is strategic or desirable to use fear as the motive in picturing to them the needs of the war program. Our people are patriotic. Thousands of our young men are volunteering before they are drafted. Bond sales are at a high level. Our people expect to win the war and are prepared to pay any price that may be necessary. They do not need to be threatened by some fear complex in order to do their best. They are responding to incentives that are on a much higher plane and more effective than fear." Instead, Curry fell into step with his typical subject matter and painted an agricultural subject.

Our Good Earth shows a farmer standing in his field of wheat, flanked on either side by children as wind gusts through the scene. The state of the man, his children, and the bountiful crop register the plenty that the farm is experiencing despite the war overseas. The farmer's face shows his concern for the times ahead, but it does not indicate any intention to depart from his land or his family for the war overseas. Typical of a Curry work, the weather alludes to the underlying stress of the war. As the family stands in the field, a gust of wind rips through the scene trying to uproot the children and disrupt the crops-just as the war threatens the farmer's land and family. When the work was published as a war bond poster the caption "Our Good Earth...Keep It Ours" was added, inspiring the onlooker to do their part by buying war bonds to "Make Every Market Day, Bond Day." Later, the work was used as the cover for a war bond pamphlet. In addition to the "Keep It Ours" caption, "Long May It Wave" was placed at the bottom of the pamphlet, referencing the "amber waves of grain" of the song "America the beautiful" and the second stanza of the "Star Spangled Banner".

=== The Farm Is a Battleground, Too ===
In October 1942, shortly after he finished Our Good Earth, Curry received an official request from the Office of War Information to make another poster. He was asked to have the poster completed by November 5 of that year. Based upon The Writers’ War Board’s directive, Curry was to convey that if America lost the war to the Nazis, then the farmers of the nation would become enslaved. Curry, however, argued that the idea to be expressed was a correct assumption of how life was in rural America. He is quoted in a letter to his dealer, Reeves Lewenthal, as saying, “Farmers are exerting all-out effort and working 70 and 80 hours a week. There is no problem as we see it out here in getting farmers to work as hard as they can, for they are doing exactly this.” Curry then requested that the board consider developing a more positive rural theme and offered to help think of one, too.

In doing so, Curry came up with an idea from a sketch he had used in a previous mural idea for the Wisconsin State Fair called, Wisconsin Agriculture Leads to Victory. He believed such a representation would be a better and more positive idea for a poster. Lewenthal agreed. Thus, in The Farm Is a Battleground, Too, he depicts a gigantic farmer who resembles the one in Our Good Earth. He is holding a pitchfork and is standing before two soldiers. He is visually connecting the activities of the farmer to those on the war front. In the background, Curry was shown a tractor and tank, both mobile, and therefore representative of the war and their respective missions. Because he wanted to keep his work as authentic as possible, Curry rejected any ideas that might go against the realities of the farmers’ work. For example, one idea that was suggested by Lewenthal was that the pitchfork be held in the same advancing motion as the soldiers’ guns. Curry objected and said that farming is a skilled profession. Having the pitchfork in such a way would seem strange and wrong.

=== Combat art ===
In 1942 the United States Army Corps of Engineers established a War Art Unit, to include both military and civilian artists, in an effort to reveal the realities of war to the nation. Artist for the program were recruited in joint effort by the Associated American Artists organization and the War Department established art committee. Unfortunately a little over six months into the program Congress cut the funds for the art project and the military artists were reassigned to other duties. Some however, continued to produce art through their military career. Additional efforts to document World War II came from private companies with a history in supporting both military and civilian artists. From 1942 to 1945, Abbott Laboratories helped produce seven different combat art projects. One such project Abbott supported in collaboration with the Surgeon General’s Office, and focused on producing medical related art. For this they commissioned well-known artists such as Peter Blume, Joseph Hirsch, and John Steuart Curry.

Curry started his commission in early 1944 at Camp Barkeley eleven miles southwest of Abilene, Texas. During his stay there, he committed himself to becoming one of the soldiers. He wore a uniform, ate, and went on bivouacs with the soldiers. Curry spent most of his time sketching training battalion units during bivouac problems, as well as following teams through their levels of field medical evacuation. He also commonly sketched the soldiers as they maneuvered their way through obstacle and infiltration courses and demonstrations in the “Nazi Village,” and strafing. While at the camp, Curry produced nearly a hundred sketches covering virtually all training exercises, a crayon portrait of Lieut. Col. Edward A. Zimmerman, and even a large oil portrait of Brig. Gen. Roy C. Heflebower, the commanding general of the medical replacement training center.

Sketches held by the Beach Museum of Art

The following is a list of sketches held by the Beach Museum of Art from Curry's time as a Combat artist. Links are external links to the Beach Museum's Catelog. The images are still under copyright.

1. Operation
2. Training Army Corp. Texas
3. Army Medical Unit to Rescue
4. Medical Training
5. The Surgeon
6. Army Medical Unit
7. Operating Room Scene(I)
8. Operating Room Scene(II)
