= Woman with Plants =

1929 oil painting by Grant Wood

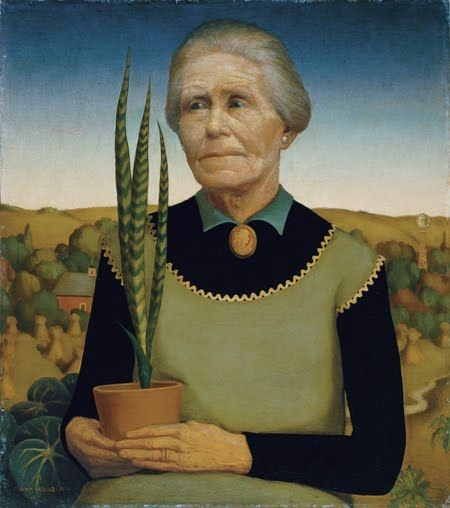
- Artist: Grant Wood
- Year: 1929

Woman with Plants is a 1929 oil painting by American artist Grant Wood, best known for his iconic work American Gothic. The portrait depicts Wood’s mother, Hattie Weaver Wood, seated in profile and holding a potted plant. This work is considered a significant step in Wood’s artistic evolution, bridging his earlier Impressionistic tendencies with the stylized realism of his mature Regionalist period.

== Background and context ==
By the late 1920s, Grant Wood had begun moving away from the Impressionistic style he had studied during travels in Europe. Upon returning to Iowa, he embraced a more representational and narrative style that became known as American Regionalism. Woman with Plants was painted during this transitional phase in Wood’s career, shortly before he produced his most famous painting, American Gothic, in 1930.

The subject of the painting, Wood’s mother Hattie, had played a major role in his life and was one of his early artistic models. The decision to paint her in this calm, stoic pose reflects both personal intimacy and the Midwestern ideals of strength, simplicity, and connection to the land.

== Description of the painting ==
Woman with Plants features a carefully structured composition of an elderly woman—identified as Grant Wood’s mother, Hattie Weaver Wood—seated in strict profile against a plain, ochre-toned background that emphasizes her figure without distraction. Her posture is upright, almost statuesque, suggesting dignity and inner strength. She is dressed in a high-necked, long-sleeved black dress typical of late 19th-century rural American fashion, with a crisply rendered white lace collar that adds contrast and delicacy to the otherwise somber attire. Her gray hair is parted neatly at the center and pulled tightly into a bun, reinforcing the austere, no-nonsense demeanor conveyed by her pose and clothing.

Resting gently in her lap is a potted Sansevieria trifasciata—commonly known as a snake plant or mother-in-law’s tongue—rendered with meticulous botanical detail. The upright, pointed leaves of the plant echo the vertical rigidity of the figure, creating a visual harmony between woman and object. The snake plant, known for its resilience and ability to thrive in harsh conditions, serves as a symbolic extension of the sitter’s own character: enduring, rooted, and quietly powerful. The way her fingers wrap gently around the pot also suggests a sense of care and custodianship, possibly evoking maternal or generational themes tied to domesticity and nurturing.

The composition is highly detailed and realistic, yet stylized in a way that would become characteristic of Wood’s mature style. The emphasis on clean lines, smooth textures, and static pose mirrors the clarity and moral seriousness of Northern Renaissance portraiture, which influenced Wood’s artistic sensibilities.

== Artistic significance and style ==
The painting is often viewed as a precursor to American Gothic, both thematically and stylistically. Like American Gothic, Woman with Plants presents a stern and stoic figure emblematic of the rural Midwest—someone who embodies the values of hard work, self-reliance, and emotional restraint. Both paintings showcase Grant Wood’s signature style: meticulously detailed surfaces, smooth brushwork, and frontal or profile compositions influenced by Northern Renaissance portraiture. The subjects are rendered with a near-photographic clarity that gives them a monumental, almost iconic presence. In both cases, Wood elevates ordinary people—his mother in Woman with Plants and a farmer and his daughter (or possibly wife) in American Gothic—to the level of symbolic archetypes of Midwestern life.

However, while American Gothic is often interpreted as containing elements of irony, social critique, or even gentle satire—particularly in its stiff postures, exaggerated facial features, and ambiguous tone—Woman with Plants conveys a markedly more intimate and sincere emotional register. There is no obvious humor or critique in Woman with Plants; instead, it exudes quiet reverence and affection. The subject is not a fictional construct but Wood’s own mother, rendered with a personal tenderness and a sense of respect for her resilience. Her profile view, serene expression, and the care with which she holds the potted plant suggest an emotional depth and maternal connection that contrast sharply with the guarded expressions and ambiguous symbolism of American Gothic.

Art historians have noted that the work reflects Wood’s admiration for traditional Flemish portraiture, particularly in its attention to minute detail and restrained emotional expression. The plant held by Hattie Wood may serve as a symbol of rootedness, domestic care, or even maternal endurance.

== Reception and legacy ==
Although Woman with Plants did not receive the widespread attention that later works by Wood would garner, it has come to be appreciated as an important transitional piece in his career. The painting marks Wood's shift toward a uniquely American vision, grounded in regional subjects and realist techniques.

In recent years, the work has gained renewed scholarly interest as critics re-examine Wood’s personal life and artistic development. The choice to portray his mother with such solemnity and precision has been interpreted both as an act of filial reverence and a subtle assertion of cultural values in the rural Midwest.

== Current location and exhibitions ==
Woman with Plants is part of the permanent collection at the Cedar Rapids Museum of Art in Cedar Rapids, Iowa, which holds the largest collection of Grant Wood’s works. The painting has been featured in several exhibitions on American Regionalism and the life and career of Grant Wood.

== Related Works and Comparisons ==
The most immediate comparison is American Gothic (1930), which, like Woman with Plants, features a frontal, stylized depiction of Midwestern figures. Both paintings employ a deliberate, polished realism and subdued color palette. Woman with Plants is also similar in tone to Wood’s other portraits from the same period, such as Daughters of Revolution and Arnold Comes of Age.

== Sources ==
- Grant Wood | Iowa Artist, Biography, & Paintings | Britannica. 9 Feb. 2025, https://www.britannica.com/biography/Grant-Wood.
- Russell, I. Jon. “Woman with Plants [1929]: Grant Wood, American [1891-1942].” Journal of Musculoskeletal Pain, vol. 19, no. 4, 2011, pp. 183–87, https://doi.org/10.3109/10582452.2011.615469.
- “Woman with Plants, 1929.” Whitney Museum of American Art, 16 Feb. 2018, https://whitney.org/media/36744.
