= Paul Revere's midnight ride =

1775 event of the American Revolution

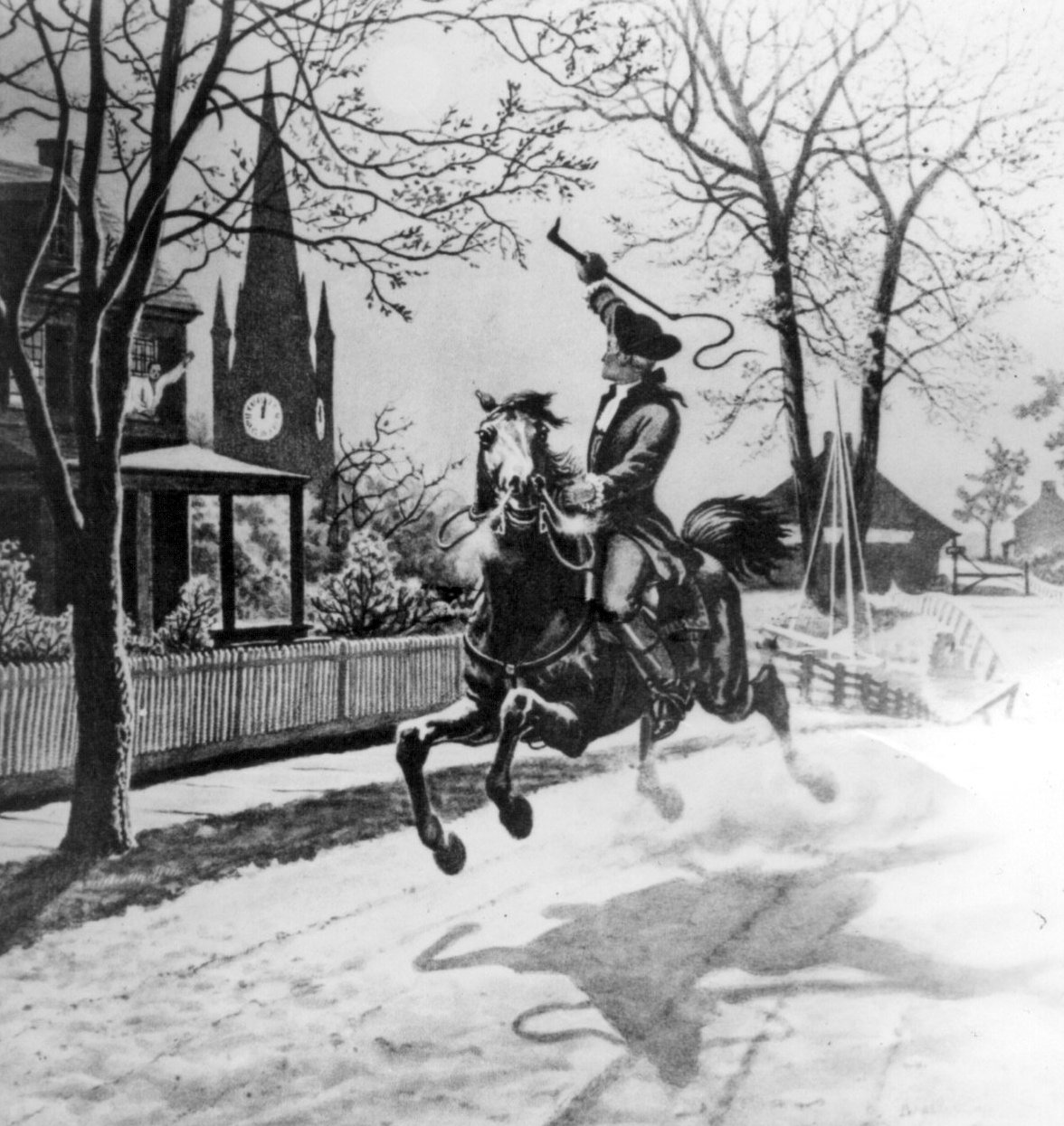
A 20th-century depiction of Revere's ride

Paul Revere's midnight ride was an alert given to minutemen in the Province of Massachusetts Bay by local Patriots on the night of April 18, 1775, warning them of the approach of British Army troops prior to the battles of Lexington and Concord. In the preceding weeks, Patriots in the region learned of a planned crackdown on the Massachusetts Provincial Congress, then based in Concord, by the British authorities in the colony.

Sons of Liberty members Paul Revere and William Dawes prepared the alert, which began when Robert Newman, the sexton of Boston's Old North Church, used a lantern signal to warn colonists in Charlestown of the British Army's advance by way of the Charles River. Revere and Dawes then rode to meet John Hancock and Samuel Adams in Lexington, ten miles (16 km) away, alerting up to 40 other Patriot riders along the way. Revere and Dawes then headed towards Concord with Samuel Prescott.

The trio were intercepted by a British Army patrol in Lincoln. Prescott and Dawes escaped but Revere was returned to Lexington by the patrol and freed after questioning. By giving the minutemen advance warning of the British Army's actions, the ride played a crucial role in the Patriot victory in the subsequent battles at Lexington and Concord. The ride has been commemorated in a range of cultural depictions, most notably Henry Wadsworth Longfellow's 1861 poem, "Paul Revere's Ride", which has shaped popular memory of the event, despite its factual inaccuracies.

== Background ==
When British Army activity on April 7, 1775 suggested the possibility of troop movements, Joseph Warren sent Paul Revere to warn the Massachusetts Provincial Congress, then sitting in Concord, the site of one of the larger caches of Patriot military supplies. After receiving the warning, Concord residents began moving the military supplies away from the town.

On April 14, General Thomas Gage, Commander-in-Chief, North America and colonial governor of Massachusetts, received instructions (dispatched on January 27) from the Earl of Dartmouth, Secretary of State for the Colonies, to disarm the rebels, who were known to have hidden weapons in Concord among other locations, and to imprison the rebellion's leaders, especially Samuel Adams and John Hancock. Dartmouth gave Gage considerable discretion in his commands. Gage issued orders to Lieutenant Colonel Francis Smith to proceed from Boston "with utmost expedition and secrecy to Concord, where you will seize and destroy... all Military stores.... But you will take care that the soldiers do not plunder the inhabitants or hurt private property." Gage did not issue written orders for the arrest of rebel leaders, as he feared doing so might spark an uprising.

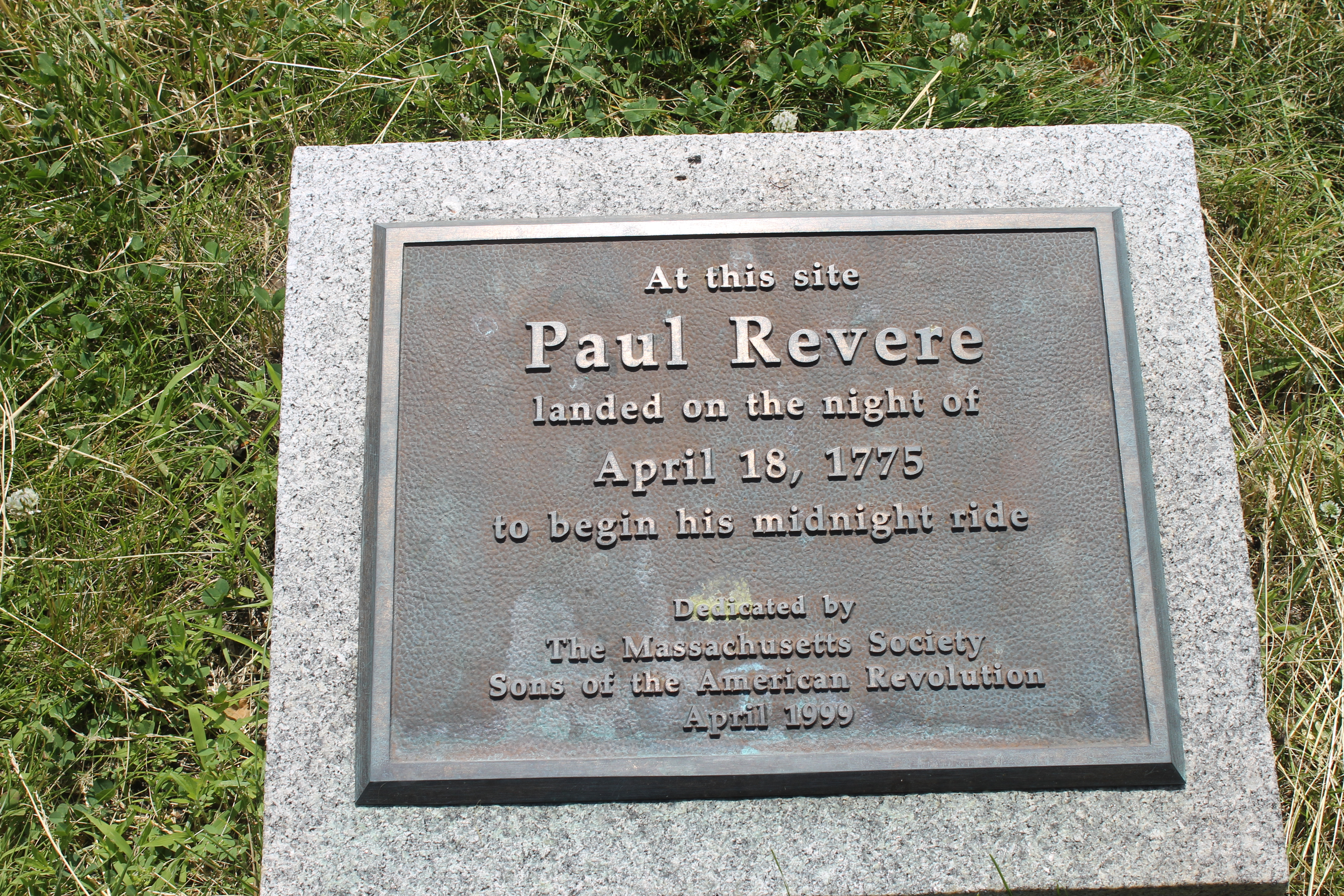
Paul Revere landing site marker, Charlestown waterfront

Between 9 and 10 p.m. on the night of April 18, 1775, Joseph Warren told Revere and William Dawes that the King's troops were about to embark in boats from Boston bound for Cambridge and the road to Lexington and Concord. Warren's intelligence suggested that the most likely objectives of the regulars' movements later that night would be the capture of Adams and Hancock. They did not worry about the possibility of regulars marching to Concord, since the supplies at Concord were safe, but they did think their leaders in Lexington were unaware of the potential danger that night. Paul Revere and William Dawes were sent out to warn them and to alert colonial militias in nearby towns.

== Events ==
=== Preparation ===
In the days before April 18, Revere had instructed Robert Newman, the sexton of the North Church, to send a signal by lantern to alert colonists in Charlestown as to the movements of British troops when the information became known. In what is well known today by the phrase "one if by land, two if by sea", one lantern in the steeple would signal the British army's choice of the land route, proceeding southwest from Boston by the peninsula of "Boston Neck", while two lanterns would signal the route "by water" across the Charles River. In the end, the British chose the water route, and therefore two lanterns were placed in the steeple.

Revere first gave instructions to send the signal to Charlestown. He then crossed the Charles River by rowboat, slipping past the Royal Navy warship HMS Somerset at anchor. Crossings were banned at that hour, but Revere safely landed in Charlestown and rode to Lexington, avoiding a British patrol and later warning almost every house along the route. The Charlestown colonists dispatched additional riders to the north.

=== Ride ===
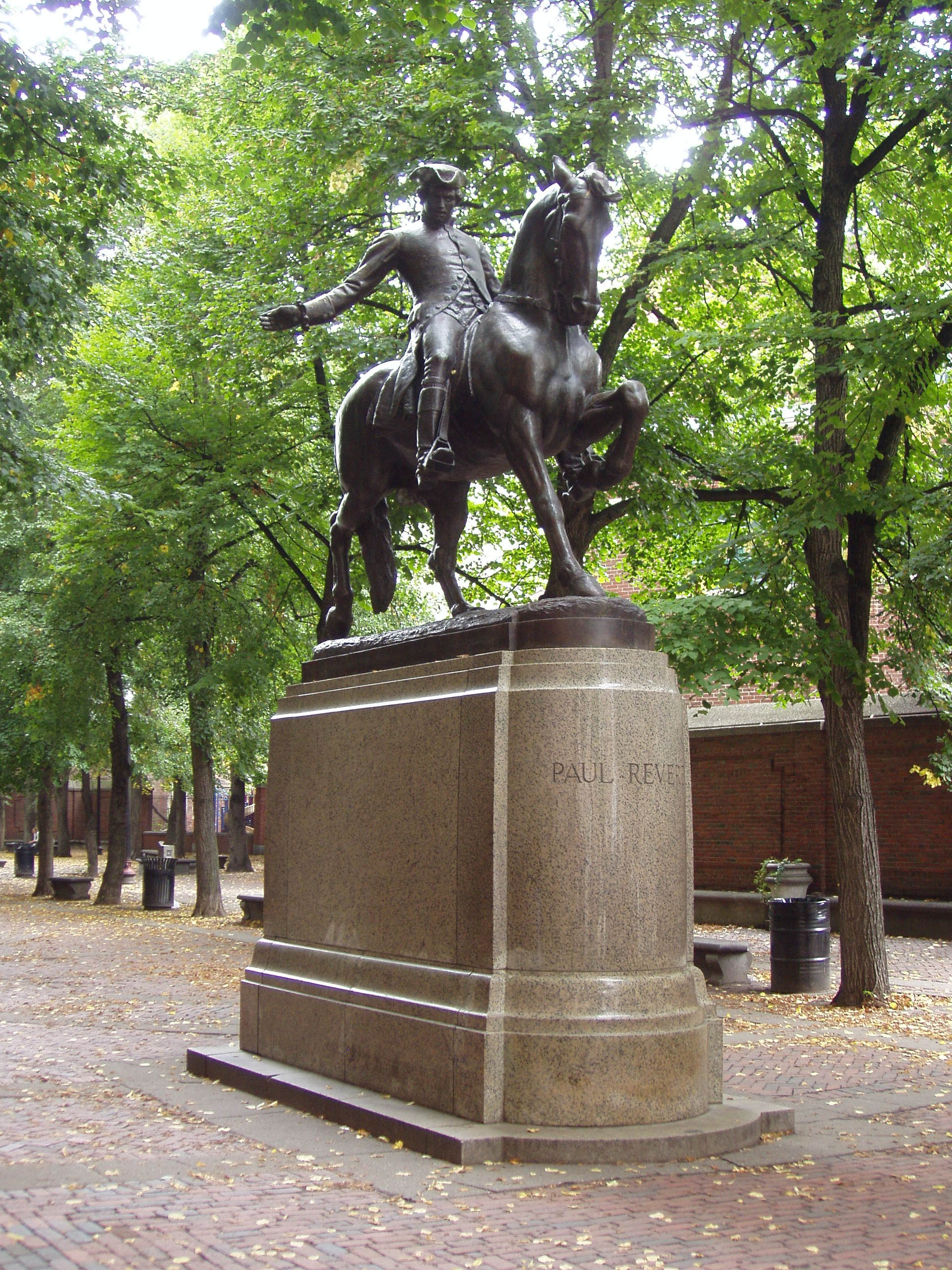
The equestrian statue of Paul Revere in Boston's North End by Cyrus Dallin was unveiled in 1940.

Riding through present-day Somerville, Medford, and Arlington, Revere warned patriots along his route, many of whom set out on horseback to deliver warnings of their own. By the end of the night there were probably as many as 40 riders throughout Middlesex County carrying the news of the army's advance. Revere did not shout the phrase later attributed to him, "The British are coming!": his mission depended on secrecy, the countryside was filled with British patrols, and most of the colonists in Massachusetts, who were predominantly of English descent, still considered themselves British.

Revere's warning, according to eyewitness accounts of the ride and Revere's own descriptions, was "The Regulars are coming out." According to his own account, Revere narrowly escaped capture in present-day Somerville near the displayed corpse of an enslaved man, which was a local landmark. Revere wrote, "After I had passed Charlestown Neck, & got nearly opposite where Mark was hung in chains." Mark was an enslaved Bostonian who was convicted of petit treason in 1755, the penalty for which was to be dragged and hanged, after which his body was gibbeted for decades, such that Revere still used the site of Mark's body as a reference point in 1798.

Revere continued on and arrived in Lexington around midnight, with Dawes, who had ridden from the south, near Boston Neck, arriving about a half-hour later. They met with Samuel Adams and John Hancock, who were spending the night with Hancock's relatives, in what is now called the Hancock–Clarke House, and they spent a great deal of time discussing plans of action upon receiving the news. They believed that the forces leaving the city were too large for the sole task of arresting two men and that Concord was the main target. The Lexington men dispatched riders to the surrounding towns, and Revere and Dawes continued along the road to Concord accompanied by Samuel Prescott, a doctor who happened to be in Lexington "returning from a lady friend's house at the awkward hour of 1 a.m."

The ride of the three men triggered a flexible system of "alarm and muster" that had been carefully developed months before, in reaction to the colonists' impotent response to the Powder Alarm of September 1774. This system was an improved version of an old network of widespread notification and fast deployment of local militia forces in times of emergency. The colonists had periodically used this system all the way back to the early years of Indian wars in the colony, before it fell into disuse in the French and Indian War.

For rapid communication from town to town—in addition to other express riders delivering messages—bells, drums, alarm guns, bonfires, and a trumpet were used, notifying the rebels in dozens of eastern Massachusetts villages that they should muster their militias because the regulars in numbers greater than 500 were leaving Boston with possible hostile intentions. This system was so effective that people in towns 25 miles (40 km) from Boston were aware of the army's movements while it was still unloading boats in Cambridge. Unlike in the Powder Alarm, the alarm raised by the three riders successfully allowed the militia to confront the British troops in Concord, and then harry them all the way back to Boston.

Revere, Dawes, and Prescott were detained by a British Army patrol in Lincoln at a roadblock on the way to Concord. Prescott jumped his horse over a wall and escaped into the woods. He eventually reached Concord. Dawes also escaped, though he fell off his horse not long after and did not complete the ride. Revere was captured and questioned by the patrol. He told them of the army's movement from Boston, and that British army troops would be in some danger if they approached Lexington, because of a large number of hostile militia gathered there.

He and other prisoners taken by the patrol were still escorted east toward Lexington, until about a half-mile from Lexington they heard a gunshot. A British major demanded Revere explain the gunfire, and Revere replied it was a signal to "alarm the country". As the group drew closer to Lexington, the town bell began to clang rapidly, upon which one of the prisoners proclaimed to the British: "The bell's ringing! The town's alarmed, and you're all dead men!"

The British soldiers gathered and decided not to press further towards Lexington but instead to free the prisoners and head back to warn their commanders. The British confiscated Revere's horse and rode off to warn the approaching army column. Revere walked to Rev. Jonas Clarke's house, where Hancock and Adams were staying. As the battle on Lexington Green unfolded, Revere assisted Hancock and his family in their escape from Lexington, helping to carry a trunk of Hancock's papers.

A National Park Service map showing the route of the initial Patriot messengers

== Legacy ==
=== Longfellow's poem ===
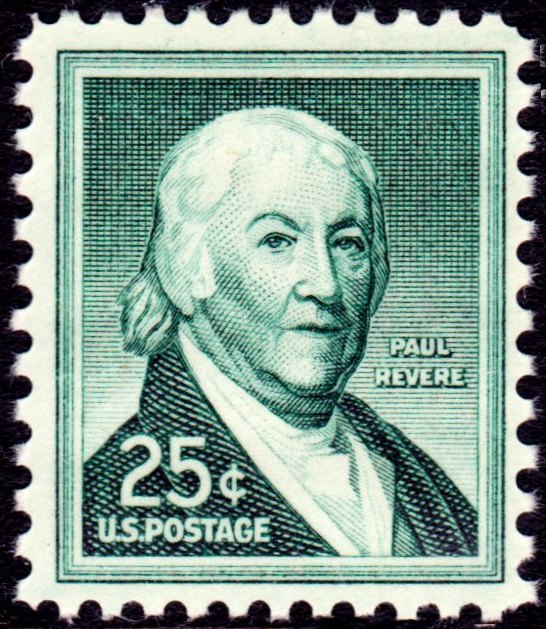
Revere on a 1958 U.S. stamp

Henry Wadsworth Longfellow popularized Paul Revere in "Paul Revere's Ride", a poem first published in 1861, over 40 years after Revere's death, and reprinted in 1863 as part of Tales of a Wayside Inn. The poem opens:

Listen, my children, and you shall hear
Of the midnight ride of Paul Revere,
On the eighteenth of April, in Seventy-Five;
Hardly a man is now alive
Who remembers that famous day and year

Longfellow's poem is not historically accurate, but the inaccuracies were deliberate. Longfellow had researched the historical event, using such works as George Bancroft's History of the United States, but he changed the facts for poetic effect. The poem was one of a series in which he sought to create American legends; earlier examples include The Song of Hiawatha (1855) and The Courtship of Miles Standish (1858). Longfellow was successful in creating a legend: Revere's stature rose significantly in the years following the poem's publication.

=== Commemoration ===
Parts of the ride route in Massachusetts are now posted with signs marked "Revere's Ride". The route follows Main Street in Charlestown, Broadway and Main Street in Somerville, Main Street and High Street in Medford, Medford Street to Arlington center, and Massachusetts Avenue the rest of the way through Lexington and into Lincoln. Revere's ride is reenacted annually.

Revere and Dawes were not the only riders. They were the only two to be noted in poetry. Samuel Prescott and Israel Bissell were also tasked to undertake the mission, Bissell being the person to ride the farthest distance of all.

=== Media ===
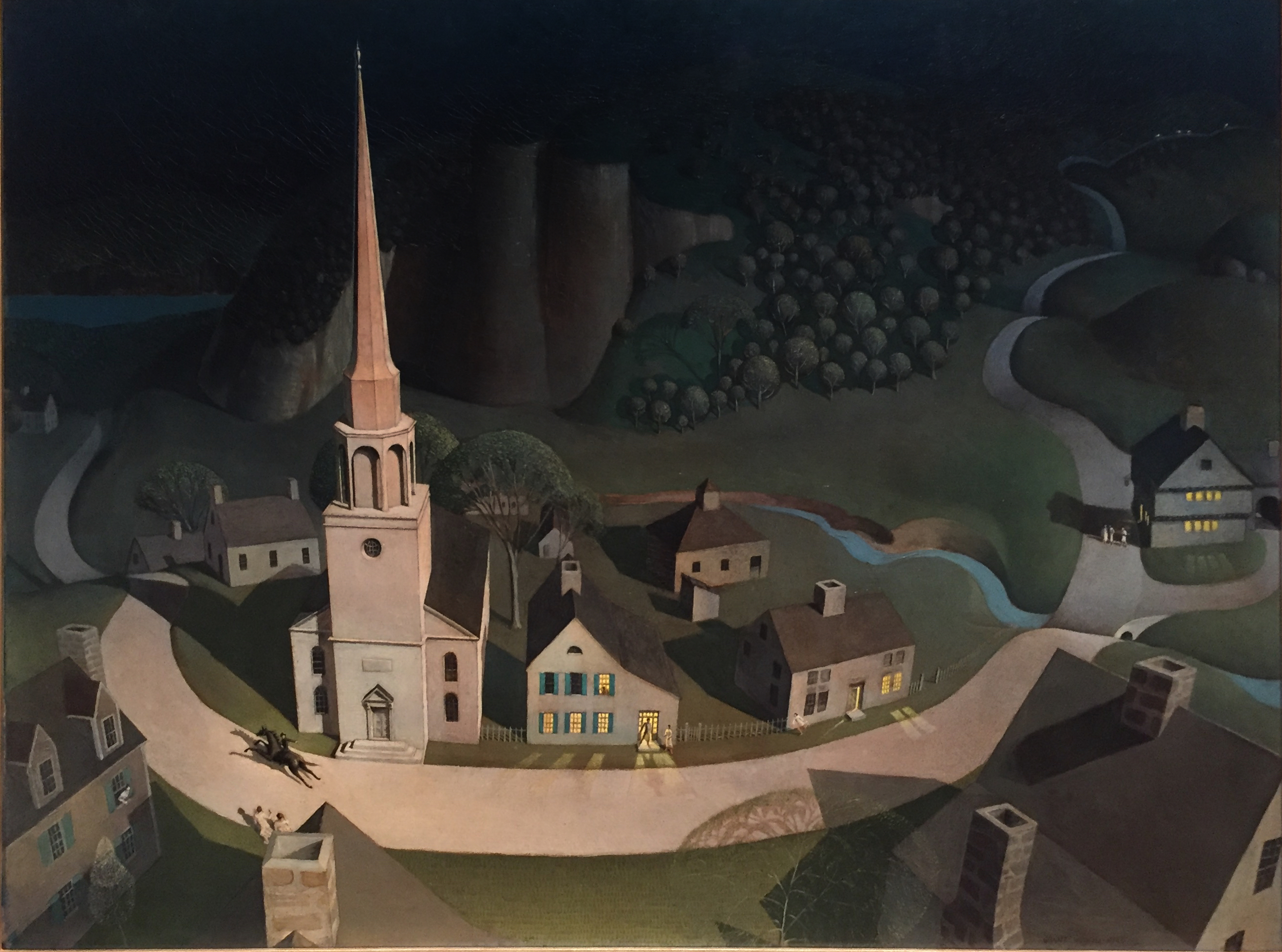
A 1931 painting of Revere's ride by Grant Wood

The Midnight Ride of Paul Revere, circa 1917. Oil painting by William Robinson Leigh

A short silent film, The Midnight Ride of Paul Revere (film), directed by Charles Brabin, was released in 1914 by Thomas A. Edison, Inc. Paul Revere was played by Augustus Phillips.

The poem in turn inspired the painting The Midnight Ride of Paul Revere, a 1931 painting by the American artist Grant Wood.

Revere’s ride is featured in the 1939 Merrie Melodies short Old Glory, directed by Chuck Jones.

=== Music ===
American singer-songwriter Bob Dylan references "Paul Revere's horse" in the lyrics of his 1965 song, "Tombstone Blues", the second track on the album Highway 61 Revisited.

The rock group Paul Revere and the Raiders had considerable popularity from the mid-1960s through the early-1970s. The band's namesake and the organist was born Paul Revere Dick, named after Revere. The song "Me and Paul Revere", written by musician Steve Martin and performed with his bluegrass group Steve Martin and the Steep Canyon Rangers, was inspired by the tale of Paul Revere's ride and told from the point of view of Revere's horse, Brown Beauty.

American rock band Four Year Strong included a track named "Paul Revere's Midnight Ride" on their 2011 album Enemy of the World.

American rock band Weezer also reference Paul Revere's ride in the song "The British Are Coming" from their 2014 album Everything Will Be Alright In The End.

American singer-songwriter Noah Kahan references Revere in his song "Paul Revere," released in 2023 on Stick Season (We'll All Be Here Forever). The chorus, "One day I'm gonna cut it clear / Ride like Paul Revere," uses Revere's midnight ride from Boston toward Lexington in April 1775 as a metaphor for fleeing one's hometown. It recasts the historic warning ride as an act of escape. In 2024, a duet version with Gregory Alan Isakov appeared on Stick Season (Forever).

=== People mistakenly or controversially associated with the ride ===
Both the midnight ride and Paul Revere have become part of national folklore, and like most folklore there are many different ways the stories have been told. In the accumulated myths, some real historical people have been incorrectly assumed to have been on the ride. Others may have been on the ride but the evidence is debated.

Wentworth Cheswill was a leader in local government in Newmarket, New Hampshire, and served as a messenger for the town's Committee of Safety, a role similar to Revere's messenger role. He is sometimes called "the black Paul Revere" and it is said, without evidence, that he was part of the midnight ride on April 18.

Sybil Ludington is sometimes called the "female Paul Revere." She is famous for another, less well-documented horseback messenger mission during the Revolutionary War, and this is sometimes described as part of the midnight ride or an extension of it.

Isaac Bissell and Israel Bissell are often confused with one another. Many historians credit one or both of them with participating in the Lexington Alarm, in which patriot messengers spread the news that the American Revolutionary War had begun (the morning after the Midnight Ride). However, some historians have argued that Israel's participation is a historical myth that arose because Isaac's name was miscopied.

== Bibliography ==
- Boatner, Mark Mayo III (1975) [1964]. Encyclopedia of the American Revolution. Library of Military History. New York: David McKay. ISBN 978-0-618-00194-1.
- Brooks, Victor (1999). The Boston Campaign: April 1775–March 1776. Conshohocken, Pennsylvania: Combined Publishing. ISBN 978-0-585-23453-3.
- Fischer, David Hackett (1994). Paul Revere's ride. New York: Oxford University Press. ISBN 0-19-508847-6. This work is extensively footnoted, and contains a voluminous list of primary resources concerning all aspects of the Revere's ride and the battles at Lexington and Concord.
- McDonald, Forrest; McDonald, Ellen (April 1980). "The Ethnic Origins of the American People, 1790". The William and Mary Quarterly. Third. 37 (2): 179–199. doi:10.2307/1919495. JSTOR 1919495.
- Miller, Joel J. (2010). The Revolutionary Paul Revere. Nashville, Tennessee: Thomas Nelson. ISBN 978-1-59555-074-3.
- Murrin, John M.; et al. (2002) [1996]. Liberty, Equality, Power: A History of the American People, Volume I: To 1877. Florence, Kentucky: Wadsworth–Thomson Learning.
- Revere, Paul (1961). Paul Revere's Three Accounts of His Famous Ride. Introduction by Edmund Morgan. Boston: Massachusetts Historical Society. ISBN 978-0-9619999-0-2.
- Ruland, Richard; Bradbury, Malcolm (1991). From Puritanism to Postmodernism: A History of American Literature. New York: Viking.
- Triber, Jayne (1998). A True Republican: The Life of Paul Revere. Amherst, Massachusetts: University of Massachusetts Press. ISBN 978-1-55849-139-7.
