= Sentimental Ballad (painting) =

1940 painting by Grant Wood

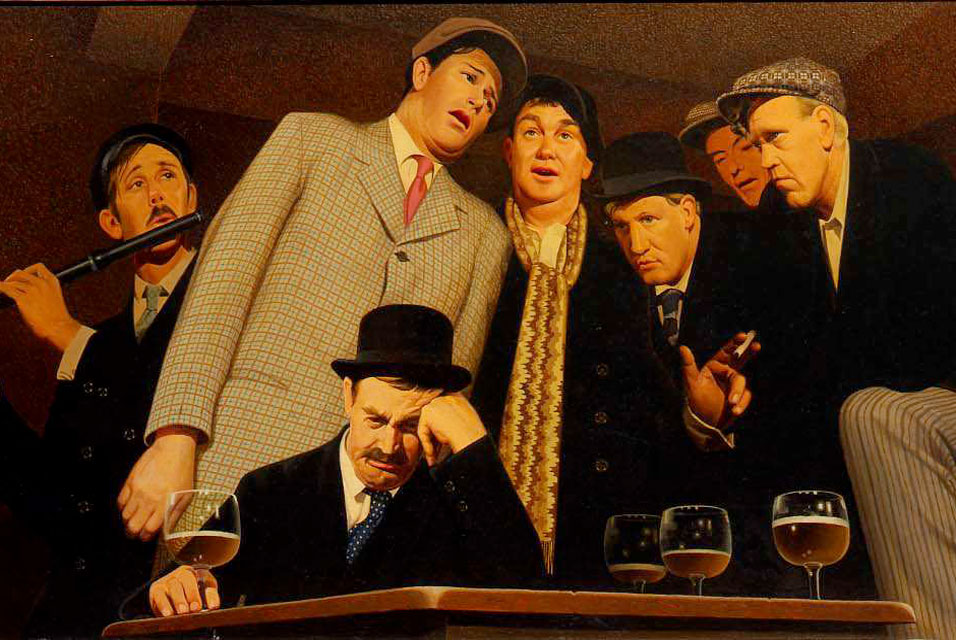
- Artist: Grant Wood
- Year: 1940
- Medium: Oil on masonite
- Dimensions: 61 cm × 127 cm (24 in × 50 in)
- Location: New Britain Museum of American Art; New Britain

Sentimental Ballad is an oil on masonite painting by the American artist Grant Wood, from 1940. It depicts a group of singing men in a bar. The painting is held at the New Britain Museum of American Art in New Britain, Connecticut.

== Creation ==
The painting came to be because of Wood's art dealer Associated American Artists and the film producer Walter Wanger, who commissioned nine popular artists to paint a motif from the upcoming film The Long Voyage Home, directed by John Ford. The other artists who participated were Thomas Benton, George Biddle, James Chapin, Ernest Fiene, Robert Philipp, Luis Quintanilla Isasi, Raphael Soyer and Georges Schreiber. The artists visited the set of the film for several weeks in May 1940. Wood's scene is toward the end of the film and features, from left to right, the actors John Qualen, John Wayne, Barry Fitzgerald, Thomas Mitchell, Joe Sawyer, David Hughes and Jack Pennick.

== Reception ==
Although originally commissioned for the marketing of a film, the painting was well received in the press and went on to tour American museums.
