= SS Grant Wood =

Liberty ship of WWII

History

United States
- Name: Grant Wood
- Namesake: Grant Wood
- Owner: War Shipping Administration (WSA)
- Operator: American Export Lines
- Ordered: as type (EC2-S-C1) hull, MC hull 1208
- Builder: St. Johns River Shipbuilding Company, Jacksonville, Florida
- Cost: $1,601,410
- Yard number: 16
- Way number: 4
- Laid down: 6 August 1943
- Launched: 14 October 1943
- Sponsored by: Mrs. Joseph W. Shands
- Completed: 26 October 1943
- Identification: Call sign: KTNY
- Fate: Laid up in the, James River Reserve Fleet, Lee Hall, Virginia, 15 June 1946; Sold for commercial use, 4 March 1947, removed from fleet, 12 March 1947

Italy
- Name: Prsolina
- Namesake: Prsolina
- Owner: Societa M. Bottiglieri (1947–1948); Vincenzo Bottiglieri (1948–1949); Michele Bottiglieri (1949–1951); Giovanni Bottiglieri (1951–1970)
- Fate: Sold for Scrapping, 1970

General characteristics
- Class & type: Liberty ship; type EC2-S-C1, standard
- Tonnage: 10,865 LT DWT; 7,176 GRT
- Displacement: 3,380 long tons (3,434 t) (light); 14,245 long tons (14,474 t) (max)
- Length: 441 feet 6 inches (135 m) oa; 416 feet (127 m) pp; 427 feet (130 m) lwl
- Beam: 57 feet (17 m)
- Draft: 27 ft 9.25 in (8.4646 m)
- Installed power: 2 × Oil fired 450 °F (232 °C) boilers, operating at 220 psi (1,500 kPa); 2,500 hp (1,900 kW)
- Propulsion: 1 × triple-expansion steam engine, (manufactured by General Machinery Corp., Hamilton, Ohio); 1 × screw propeller
- Speed: 11.5 knots (21.3 km/h; 13.2 mph)
- Capacity: 562,608 cubic feet (15,931 m^{3}) (grain); 499,573 cubic feet (14,146 m^{3}) (bale)
- Complement: 38–62 USMM; 21–40 USNAG
- Armament: Varied by ship; Bow-mounted 3-inch (76 mm)/50-caliber gun; Stern-mounted 4-inch (102 mm)/50-caliber gun; 2–8 × single 20-millimeter (0.79 in) Oerlikon anti-aircraft (AA) cannons and/or, 2–8 × 37-millimeter (1.46 in) M1 AA guns

SS Grant Wood was a Liberty ship built in the United States during World War II. She was named after Grant Wood, an American painter best known for his paintings depicting the rural American Midwest, particularly American Gothic.

== Construction ==
Grant Wood was laid down on 6 August 1943, under a Maritime Commission (MARCOM) contract, MC hull 1208, by the St. Johns River Shipbuilding Company, Jacksonville, Florida; she was sponsored by Mrs. Joseph W. Shands, of Jacksonville, and was launched on 14 October 1943.

== History ==
She was allocated to American Export Lines, on 26 October 1943. On 15 June 1946, she was laid up in the James River Reserve Fleet, Lee Hall, Virginia. She was sold for commercial use, 4 March 1947, to the government of Italy, for $544,506. She was removed from the fleet on 12 March 1947. Grant Wood was renamed Prsolina and reflagged in Italy.

== Bibliography ==
- "St. John's River Shipbuilding, Jacksonville FL". www.ShipbuildingHistory.com. 16 October 2010.
- Maritime Administration. "Grant Wood". Ship History Database Vessel Status Card. U.S. Department of Transportation, Maritime Administration.
- Davies, James (May 2004). "Specifications (As-Built)" (PDF). p. 23.
- "SS Grant Wood".
