= Edna Reindel =

American painter

- Born: February 19, 1894; Detroit, Michigan, U.S.
- Died: April 3, 1990 (aged 96); Bloomfield Hills, Michigan, U.S.
- Education: Pratt Institute
- Known for: Painting, sculpture, mural art
- Movement: American Regionalism; Surrealism

Edna Reindel (February 19, 1894 – April 3, 1990) was a subtle Surrealist and American Regionalist painter, printmaker, illustrator, sculptor, muralist, and teacher active from the 1920s to the 1960s. She is best known for her work in large-scale murals, New England landscapes, and later for her commissioned work of women workers in WWII shipyard and aircraft industries as published in Life magazine in 1944.

== Personal life and education ==
Born in Detroit, Michigan, Edna Reindel began her formal artistic studies in 1918 at the Detroit School of Design. The next year, she moved to New York where she attended Brooklyn's Pratt Institute until her graduation in 1923. In the following years, she worked as a freelance illustrator and painter. She won a Louis Comfort Tiffany Foundation Fellowship in 1926 and 1932, and continued to live and work in New York until she moved to California in the 1938. Edna Reindel died in Bloomfield Hills, Michigan in 1990 at age 96.

== Artistic career ==
After emerging from the Pratt Institute, Edna Reindel illustrated children's books and book jackets (1926). Between 1933 and 1937, she created at least five different still-life covers for Conde Nast's House and Garden magazine. Most of these were very sensual depictions of flowers (probably influenced by Georgia O'Keeffe) in a style somewhere between surrealistic and hyper-realistic.

During the Great Depression, the Treasury Section of Painting and Sculpture (later Section of Fine Arts) and the WPA commissioned Reindel to create paintings, murals and sculptures around the country. During 1933 and 1934 Reindel was commissioned by the WPA to execute "easel paintings" for federal buildings. At least two of these paintings are apparently still on display, one in the Pentagon, and another at the Department of Labor building in Washington, D.C. A mural commissioned by the Treasury in 1935 was in a Stamford, Connecticut public housing project called Fairfield Court, and took up four walls of a small reception room. Reindel's 1939 Treasury mural depicting Eli Whitney—Experimenting with the First Model of the Cotton Gin—can still be viewed at the Emmanuel County Courthouse in Swainsboro, Georgia. The mural depicts Whitney's 1791 experiments and demonstration of the cotton gin in Swainsboro, Georgia.

Reindel had work featured in exhibits in California between 1938 and 1953; during this time, she also painted portraits of stars of motion pictures. In 1939, her work Contemplation was purchased by the Metropolitan Museum of Art. Also during this stretch, her work was exhibited in galleries that included the Stendahl Galleries, the Los Angeles County Museum of Art, and the Vigeveno Galleries.

In 1944, Life magazine published pieces from a series they commissioned from Reindel in 1943, entitled Women at War. These images were meant to display the experiences of working women supporting the Allied war effort. Previously in 1937, Life magazine had included a featured piece on Reindel's Martha's Vineyard pieces including The Netmenders. In the 1943 series, with pieces like Calship Worker, Wilmington, California (1943), Reindel uniquely captured women workers in war time – from the lens of a working woman artist. LIFE published nine paintings developed from observations of women workers at and sketches of the Lockheed Air Craft Factory in Los Angeles. Reindel's work capturing Rosie the Riveter (1943) types helped to popularize the song "Rosie the Riveter." Four of these pieces are in the National Museum of Women in the Arts permanent collection.

In 1948 and 1949, Reindel achieved notoriety with works that focused on the fear and horror of the atom bomb. These works were part of a series known as "The Effects of War on People," and include Hiroshima (1949), The Praying Mothers (1949), Angels Wept at Los Alamos (1949), Beast on Bikini (1949), Radioactive Mother and Child (1949), and Brother and Sister (1949).

Throughout her career, Reindel also illustrated, sketched, created collages, and developed restoration skills. Indeed, she applied her restoration skills in work for the heiress, art collector and philanthropist Doris Duke during the 1950s and 1960s. In the 1950s and 1960s, she worked in metal sculpture. During this time she also created teaching materials and wrote books about painting. Furthermore, Reindel painted portraits of famous actors such as Spencer Tracy, Ronald Colman, Gregory Peck as well as some of their family members. Spencer Tracy, Greer Garson, Vincent Price, Ray Milland and Hedda Hopper were among the Hollywood personalities who collected her art.

== Reception and genre ==
Reindel's work was received in different ways across her career. With illustrations and landscape paintings, a portion of Reindel's work was identified with American Regionalism. Her early works of still life and landscape scenes were also noted for their surreal tendencies. Others described her work up until 1939 as Formalist Realism. Reindel described her work, in turns, as "psycho-realist" and noted in 1937 that her "landscapes and still lifes are straight realism with a modern trend."

== Works ==
- ca. 1931–1933 – Tulips (oil, painting)
- 1934 – Port of Edgartown
- 1935 – Rhododendron
- 1937 – Contemplation (oil on canvas, painting)
- 1939 – Experimenting with the First Model of the Cotton Gin (mural)
- 1943 – Calship Worker, Wilmington, California (painting)
- 1943 – Rosie the Riveter (painting)

== Awards ==
- 1926 – Louis Comfort Tiffany Foundation Fellowship Award
- 1932 – Louis Comfort Tiffany Foundation Fellowship Award
- 1935 – Art Director's Club, Fellowship Award (New York, NY, USA)
- 1939 – Medal, Beverly Hills Art Festival (City of Beverly Hills, Beverly Hills, CA, USA)

== Notable exhibitions ==
- 1931 – Weyhe Galleries (NY) (first exhibition)
- 1934 – Macbeth Gallery (first solo show)
- 1930, 1937 – Cororan Gallery biennials
- 1934–35, 1945, 1948 – Art Institute of Chicago
- 1935–38, 1941 Pennsylvania Academy of Fine Art Annual
- 1937, 1940, 1947 – Macbeth Gallery
- 1937–38, 1940, 1949 – WMAA
- 1937–38, 1944–46, 1947–49 – Carnegie Institute

== Notable collections and retrospectives ==
- Preserving the Past, Securing the Future: Donations of Art, 1987–1997
- 1991 – Edna Reindel American Magic Realist (1894–1990), Robert Henry Adams Fine Art, Chicago, IL, USA
