= Arnold Comes of Age =

1930 painting by Grant Wood

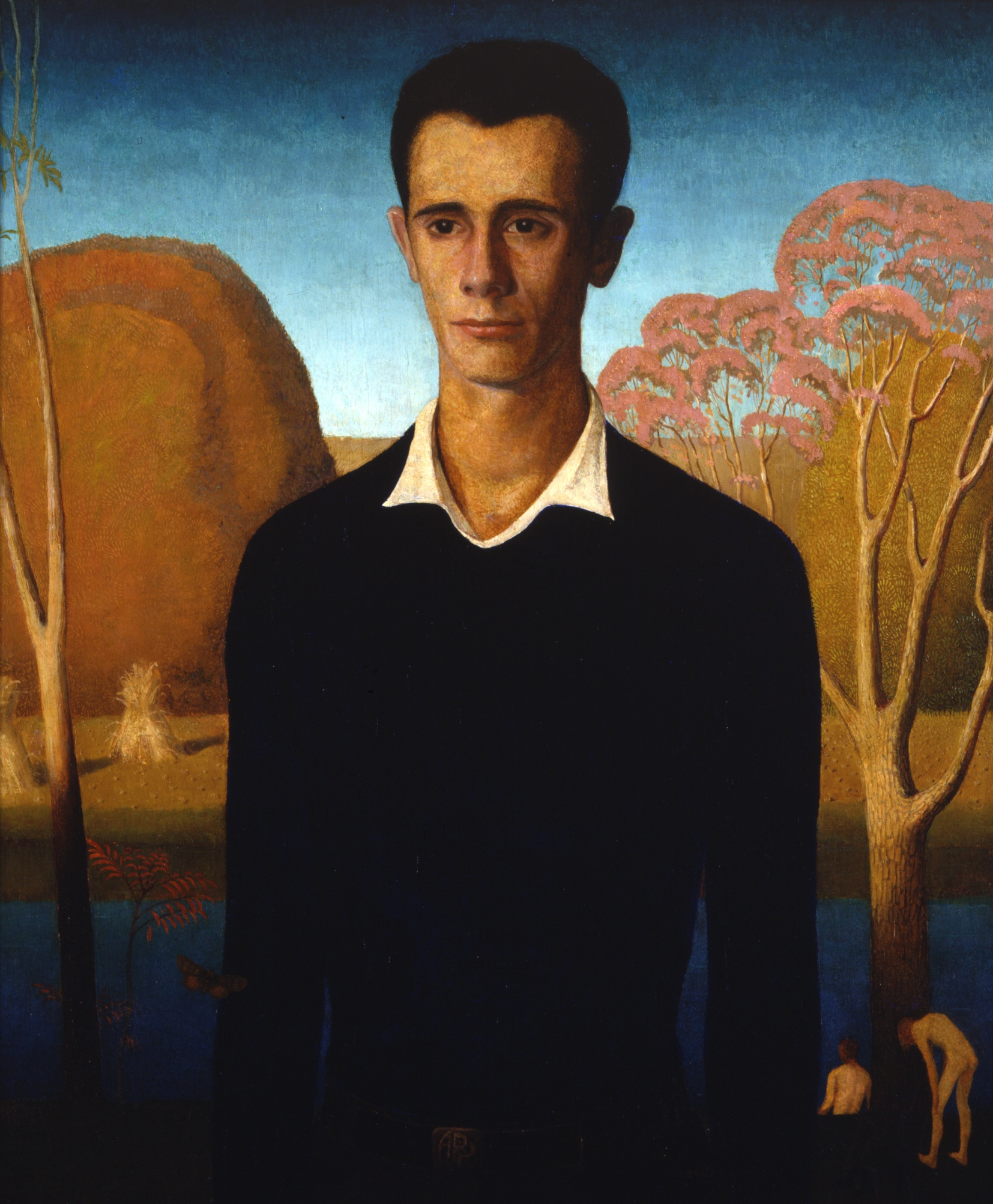
- Artist: Grant Wood
- Year: 1930
- Medium: Oil on pressed board
- Dimensions: 26.75 cm × 23 cm (10.53 in × 9.1 in)
- Location: Sheldon Museum of Art; Lincoln

Arnold Comes of Age (originally Portrait of Arnold Pyle) is a 1930 oil painting by the American regionalist painter Grant Wood, created as a birthday gift for his studio assistant, Arnold Pyle. Wood took Pyle on as his protégé and was deeply affectionate towards him. The painting depicts a figure looking ahead in a rural landscape, as two nude men bathe in a river. It is reminiscent of Italian Renaissance artist Piero della Francesca's work, in particular The Resurrection, and it is interpreted as homoerotic from its detailing.

== Background and painting ==
Grant Wood was a regionalist painter from Iowa. During the Great Depression, he became one of the more prominent regionalists of the country. Arnold Comes of Age was completed in 1930 in celebration of the twenty-first birthday of his studio assistant, Arnold Pyle. Pyle, a painter himself and protégé of Wood, won blue ribbons at the Iowa State Fair for his art depicting the Midwest in 1933, and the grand prize in 1936. He was heterosexual, and despite the affection that Wood showed him, did not romantically reciprocate—as Wood had done with many of his assistants, he disguised his outward affection as paternal love.

The painting was originally entitled Portrait of Arnold Pyle. It depicts an awkward young man looking at the viewer as a butterfly lands on his shirt, set in a countryside while two men bathe in a nearby river. It is made of oil and is displayed on pressed board. Its dimensions are 26.75 inches (67.9 cm) tall by 23 inches (58 cm) across.

== Interpretation ==
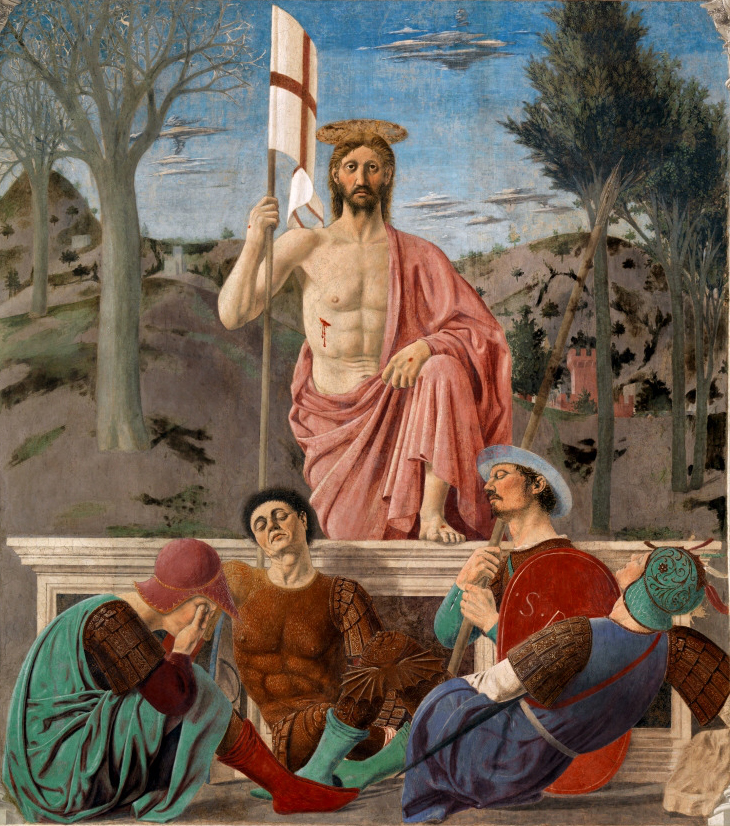
The Resurrection by Piero della Francesca

The art critic Luciano Cheles says that many of Wood's paintings—including his famous American Gothic—were inspired by works produced during the Italian Renaissance, especially those of the fifteenth-century artist Piero della Francesca. Arnold Comes of Age may have been inspired by his painting The Resurrection, as the paintings share several similarities. In both paintings, the central profile is "neatly" set apart from the background, looking at the viewer with a serious gaze; a figure with a distant look was a typical element of della Francesca's art. The paintings also have two trees framing them: in Wood, one young and one mature, and in della Francesca, one bare and one full of leaves. For Cheles, these contrasting trees represent life and death, as well as a general transition between two states. Della Francesca also painted The Baptism of Christ, and Cheles argues that the nude bathers in Wood's painting are similar to that work. These bathers may symbolize baptism, and consequently, one coming of age.

Ulysses Grant Dietz, a former curator of The Newark Museum of Art, said that the painting indicates an "obvious love" for Arnold. Details such as recurrent couplings (of trees, bushes, and stacks of hay) may demonstrate a love for Pyle, and the two nude swimmers in the back could represent the Christian figures Adam and Eve in the Garden of Eden. Wood chose to sign his name beside Pyle's beltbuckle—adorned with AP, for Arnold Pyle—perhaps so the two men could have their names forever linked. Arnold Comes of Age also depicts a butterfly—which was understood at the time as a gay symbol—landing on Arnold's shirt. The painting is thought to be homoerotic, although critic Faye Hirsch says this interpretation allows researchers to make claims about Wood's life with only minimal evidence.

== History ==
After Arnold Comes of Age was completed, Wood entered it into the 1930, Iowa State Fair Art Salon. Wood was well-established at the time and had earlier exhibited at galleries in Paris. However, as a regionalist committed to promoting the artistic movement, he decided to show Arnold Comes of Age and other paintings in Iowa instead. Arnold Comes of Age won the grand prize, and his painting Stone City, Iowa won the landscape category.

Arnold Comes of Age was displayed in a 1940 Nebraskan show alongside Stone City, Iowa and John B. Turner, Pioneer, a portrait of the father of his patron David Turner that Wood completed in 1929–30. These were all offered for sale, each at a price of between $300 and $400. The board of trustees for the Nebraska Art Association paid $300 for Arnold Comes of Age, while the Joslyn Art Museum of Omaha acquired Stone City, Iowa. It has since become one of the most valuable pieces within the Association's permanent collection, and resides at the Sheldon Museum of Art in Lincoln, Nebraska. The Sheldon Museum of Art holds the artwork of the association, the University of Nebraska–Lincoln, and other collections.

For years, it was not shown publicly due to its significant deterioration: discoloration, extensive craquelure, and varnish disappearance plagued the painting. The bathing figures were, according to Donald Bartlett Doe of the Sheldon, "nearly obliterated". These problems began some ten years after its completion, but by 1985, they were addressed through restoration.
