= Mark Codman =

Executed enslaved African-American

Mark (died September 18, 1755) (sometimes called Mark Codman) was a Black man enslaved by Captain John Codman (1696–1755) of Massachusetts in Charlestown, Boston 20 years before the American Revolutionary War. Though some texts refer to Mark as "Mark Codman", he was probably not referred to as such during his life, as giving an enslaved person the surname of his enslaver was not commonly done in New England. The contemporary documents from the investigation and trial only use Mark for his name.

Mark was enslaved by Codman a few years before his execution. He was accused of burning down a building to try to gain his freedom about six years before his death. Mark could read and said that he read the Bible to find a way to kill his enslaver without committing a sin. He struck upon poisoning because it did not involve the shedding of blood. According to historical documents from the investigation and judgment, Mark obtained arsenic from a doctor on the pretense it was to kill pigs but furnished it to his sister, who administered it to Codman. Several other enslaved people were also implicated in the plot.

In 1755, Mark was convicted of assisting in the successful poisoning of his enslaver, John Codman. As punishment, Mark was hanged and tarred. His body was displayed in an iron gibbet for several years after his death at a well-known spot (at the time) in present-day Somerville, Massachusetts. Mark's sister Phillis was tried for the actual act of poisoning; she was convicted and burned alive.

Mark's publicly displayed body was a local landmark. In 1775, twenty years after Mark's execution, Paul Revere came to the same spot in his ride to warn American colonial forces of the movements of the British Army. Revere's 1798 written account noted that "nearly opposite where Mark was hung in chains, I saw two men on Horse back, under a Tree. When I got near them, I discovered they were British officers", whom Revere successfully evaded.

== See also ==
- History of slavery in Massachusetts
