= Clyde Singer =

Clyde Singer (October 20, 1908 – January 5, 1999) was an American painter and museum curator known for landscape and genre paintings associated with the American Scene tradition. His work often depicted rural small-town life as well as urban scenes, particularly New York City subjects, in a realist style. Singer served for decades at the Butler Institute of American Art in Youngstown, Ohio, and remained active as an exhibiting artist throughout his life.

== Early life and education ==
Clyde J. Singer was born in Malvern, Ohio, on October 20, 1908. According to an institutional biography maintained by the Canton Museum of Art, he began drawing at an early age and, while still in high school, produced signs for local farmers and businesses. After graduating in 1928, Singer worked for a sign-painting company in Canton, Ohio.

Singer studied for two years at the school associated with the Columbus Gallery of Fine Arts (commonly referred to in sources as the Columbus Art School). In 1933 he received a scholarship to the Art Students League of New York, where he studied under and was influenced by American Scene painters John Steuart Curry and Thomas Hart Benton. Singer later returned to Ohio during the Great Depression.

== Career ==
During the mid-1930s Singer exhibited widely in juried exhibitions. A biographical profile on Painting the American Scene states that he participated in eighty-two exhibitions in fifty-six cities during an eighteen-month period in 1935–1936. The same source reports that in 1938 he won the First Julius Hallgarten Prize from the National Academy of Design for Barn Dance, awarded to the best painting in the Academy’s annual exhibition among artists under 35.

In 1940 Singer joined the Butler Institute of American Art in Youngstown, Ohio, beginning a long institutional career that continued until his death. He is frequently described in Butler-related materials as a longtime curator and institutional figure associated with the museum’s permanent collection. Singer’s career at the Butler also forms part of the narrative in the PBS Western Reserve documentary Clyde Singer: An American Artist, which notes his relocation to the Youngstown area in 1940 and identifies his style with American Scene painting.

== Style and themes ==
Singer is commonly associated with American Scene realism, depicting everyday life and recognizable social settings in both rural Ohio and urban environments. A major institutional exhibition at the Butler Institute of American Art emphasized the breadth of his subjects and the depth of the museum’s holdings, presenting Singer’s work from the Butler collection in Clyde Singer’s World (2020–2021).

== Exhibitions and collections ==
Singer’s work has been the subject of museum exhibitions and retrospective presentations, including Clyde Singer’s World at the Butler Institute of American Art (September 27, 2020 – January 3, 2021). The Vindicator described the show as drawing from the Butler’s Singer holdings and noted Singer’s long museum service in Youngstown.

Singer’s centennial year was also marked by documentary coverage. PBS Western Reserve produced Clyde Singer: An American Artist in 2008, describing it as a documentary celebrating his centennial birthday year and summarizing his training and career. A companion publication, Clyde Singer’s America, was issued by Kent State University Press and is presented as a richly illustrated study placing Singer’s work in context.

Institutional biographical materials hosted by the Canton Museum of Art Collection document his early life, early commercial work as a sign painter, and training background.

== Legacy ==
Singer has been remembered as a prominent figure in northeastern Ohio art circles due to his dual role as an exhibiting painter and longtime museum professional at the Butler Institute of American Art. His centennial was marked by documentary production and related programming that framed his work as part of the American Scene tradition.
