= Daughters of Revolution =

1932 painting by Grant Wood

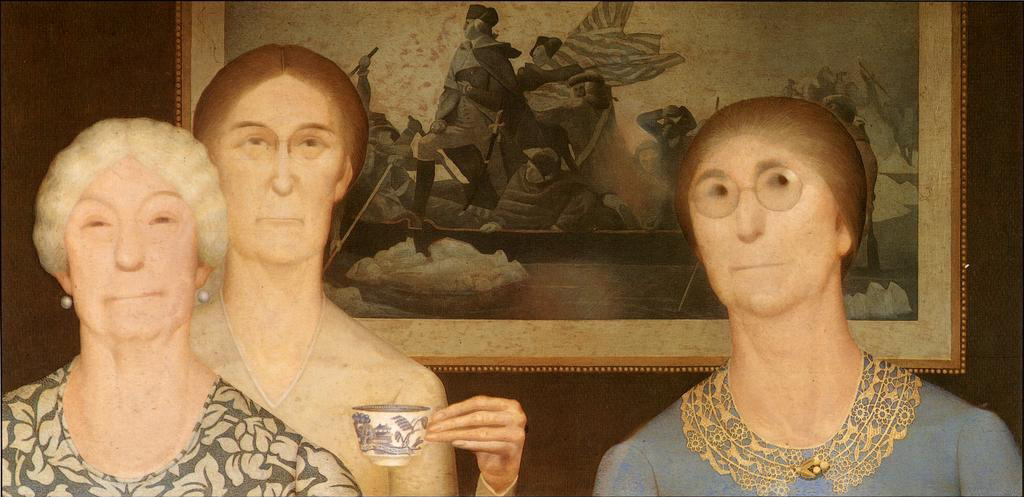
- Artist: Grant Wood
- Year: 1932
- Type: Oil on masonite
- Medium: Masonite
- Dimensions: 50.8 cm × 101.4 cm (20.0 in × 39.9 in)
- Location: Cincinnati Art Museum, Cincinnati

Daughters of Revolution (1932) is a painting by American artist Grant Wood, who said it was his only satire.

== Origin ==
In 1927, Wood was commissioned to create a stained glass window in the Veterans Memorial Coliseum in Cedar Rapids, Iowa. Unhappy with the quality of domestic glass sources, he used glass made in Germany. The local chapter of the Daughters of the American Revolution (DAR) complained about the use of a German source for a World War I memorial, as Germany had been an enemy of the US in that war. They expressed a lingering anti-German sentiment in society, and other people in Cedar Rapids also protested the German source. As a result, the window was not dedicated until 1955.

Wood was said to have described the DAR as "those Tory gals" and "people who are trying to set up an aristocracy of birth in a Republic." Five years later Wood painted Daughters of Revolution, which he described as his only satire. He emphasized the contrast of three aged women in faded dresses framed against the heroic 1851 painting of Washington Crossing the Delaware, which, ironically, was painted in Germany by the German-American artist Emanuel Leutze. Wood depicted his mother's clothing on the models, including a lace collar and amber pin he bought for her in Germany.

== Critique ==
Critics have commented on the juxtaposition of these women and the mythic painting of George Washington portrayed in one of his wartime feats. Based on Tripp Evans' biography Grant Wood, A Life (2010), Henry Adams in his review says that Wood's painting Daughters of Revolution depicts not women but men: the Founding Fathers as cross-dressing figures, who stand in front of a recreation of Washington Crossing the Delaware. Evans discusses Wood's alleged homosexuality in his book, as well as his fascination with what Adams describes as "changes of gender".

In her review of Evans' book, Deborah Solomon thinks that he overstates the case for Wood as a homosexual and pushes this view too much in interpreting his works. She argues that Wood might better be described as asexual. Solomon finds Wood haunted by the dead, saying, "He longed for the company of the dead and tunneled back through time in his enchanting and elegiac paintings. He deserves to be remembered as one of the essential eccentrics of American art." Wood himself called it "A pretty rotten painting. Carried by its subject matter."

== See also ==
- The Generals of the Daughters of the American Revolution
