= The Midnight Ride of Paul Revere (painting) =

1931 painting by Grant Wood

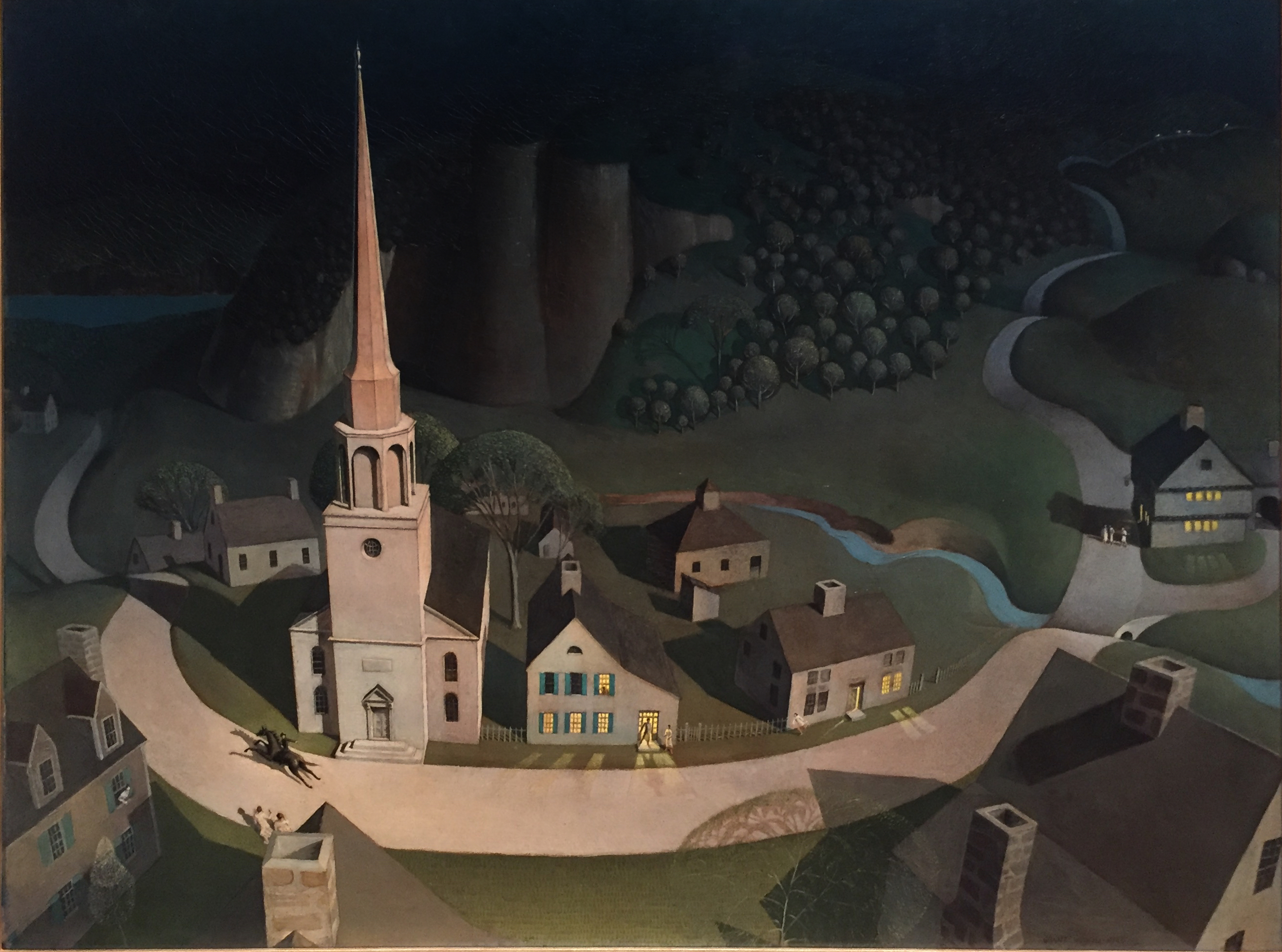
- Artist: Grant Wood
- Year: 1931
- Medium: Oil on masonite
- Dimensions: 76 cm × 100 cm (30 in × 40 in)
- Location: Metropolitan Museum of Art, New York

The Midnight Ride of Paul Revere is a 1931 painting by the American artist Grant Wood. It depicts the American patriot Paul Revere during his midnight ride on April 18, 1775. The perspective is from a high altitude as Revere rides through a brightly lit Lexington, Massachusetts. It was inspired by the 1860 poem "Paul Revere's Ride" by Henry Wadsworth Longfellow. Wood used a child's hobby horse as model for Revere's horse.

The painting is located at the Metropolitan Museum of Art in New York City.

== Provenance ==
The painting belonged to Mr. and Mrs. Cecil M. Gooch in Memphis, Tennessee from 1931 to 1950, after which it was given to YWCA Memphis as a gift. The same year it was sold for $15,000 to the Metropolitan Museum of Art.
