= Grant Wood =

American painter (1891–1942)

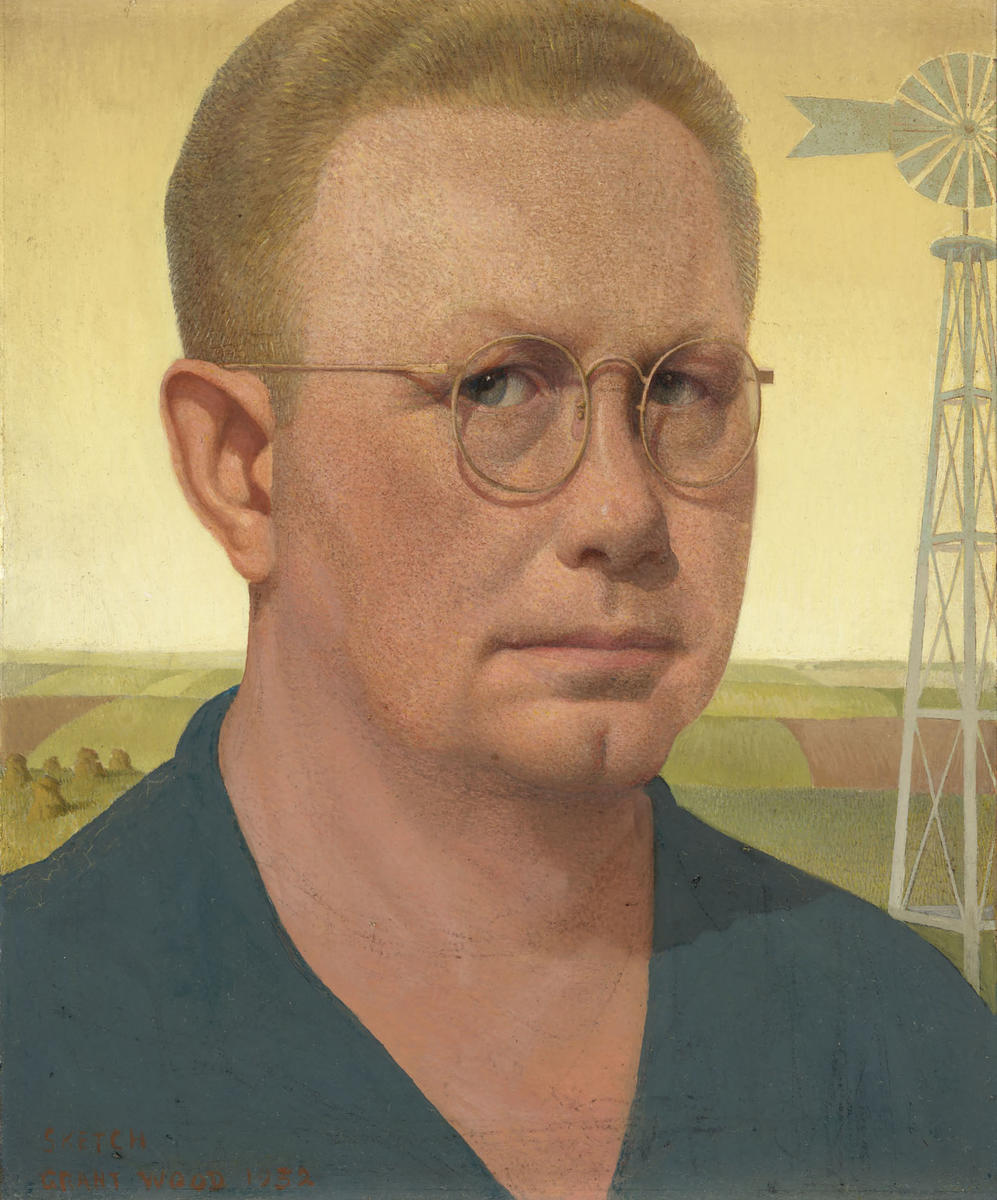
- Self-portrait, 1932
- Born: Grant DeVolson Wood; February 13, 1891; Anamosa, Iowa, U.S.
- Died: February 12, 1942 (aged 50); Iowa City, Iowa, U.S.
- Education: School of the Art Institute of Chicago
- Known for: Painting, architect
- Notable work: American Gothic
- Movement: Regionalism
- Relatives: Nan Wood Graham (sister)

Signature
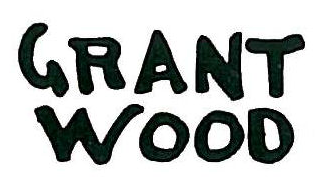

Grant DeVolson Wood (February 13, 1891 – February 12, 1942) was an American artist and representative of Regionalism, best known for his paintings depicting the rural American Midwest. He is particularly well known for American Gothic (1930), which has become an iconic example of early 20th-century American art.

== Early life ==
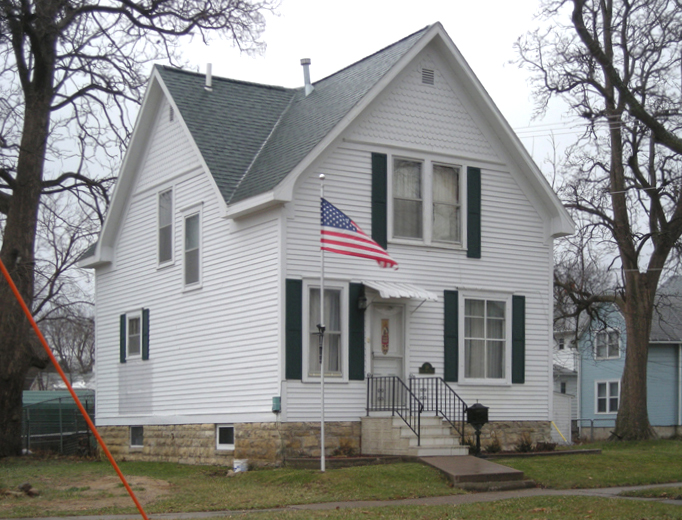
Grant Wood's boyhood home, in Cedar Rapids, Iowa, is listed as one of the most endangered historic sites in Iowa.

Wood was born in rural Iowa, 4 mi (6.43 km) east of Anamosa, on February 13, 1891, the son of Hattie DeEtte Wood (née Weaver) and Francis Maryville Wood. His maternal grandparents worked as innkeepers and his paternal grandparents were enslavers in Virginia. Hattie moved the family to Cedar Rapids after Francis died in 1901. Soon thereafter, Wood began as an apprentice in a local metal shop. After graduating from Washington High School, he enrolled in The Handicraft Guild, an art school run entirely by women in Minneapolis in 1910.

In 1913, Wood enrolled at the School of the Art Institute of Chicago, where he studied from 1913 to 1916. Wood also performed some work as a silversmith.

== Career ==
Near the end of World War I, Wood joined the army, working as an artist designing camouflage scenes as well as other art.

From 1919 to 1925, Wood taught art to junior high school students in the Cedar Rapids public school system. This employment provided financial stability, and its seasonal nature allowed him summer trips to Europe to study art. Wood also took a leave of absence for the 1923–1924 school year so he could spend an entire year studying in Europe. During his stint as a teacher, Wood experimented with woodworking and metalworking. For example, he built a bench for students who broke the rules to sit on while awaiting punishment from the school principal, which Wood titled Mourner's Bench, a humorous reference to the mourner's bench used in Methodist churches.

From 1924 to 1935, Wood lived with his mother in the hayloft of a carriage house in Cedar Rapids, which he had converted into his personal studio at "5 Turner Alley" (the studio had no address until Wood made one up).

Between 1922 and 1928, Wood made four trips to Europe, where he studied many styles of painting, especially Impressionism and post-Impressionism. However, it was the work of the 15th-century Flemish artist Jan van Eyck that influenced him to take on the clarity of this technique and incorporate it in his new works. Additionally, Wood's 1928 trip to Munich was to oversee the making of the stained glass windows he had designed for a Veterans Memorial Building in Cedar Rapids.

In 1932, Wood helped found the Stone City Art Colony near his hometown to help artists get through the Great Depression. He became a great proponent of regionalism in the arts, lecturing throughout the country on the topic. As Wood's classically American image was solidified, his bohemian days in Paris were expunged from his public persona.

In 1934, Wood was offered a position working and teaching in Iowa City as Director of a New Deal Public Works of Art Project (PWAP). While headquartered in Iowa City and associated with the University of Iowa, he assisted other artists and art students in producing a set of murals for Iowa State University in Ames, Iowa. Once his PWAP concluded in 1934, the University of Iowa offered Wood a three-year-term as an Associate Professor of Fine Art. He taught painting at the university's School of Art until 1941. During that time, Wood supervised mural painting projects, mentored students including Elizabeth Catlett, produced a variety of his own works, and became a key part of the university's cultural community.

== Work ==
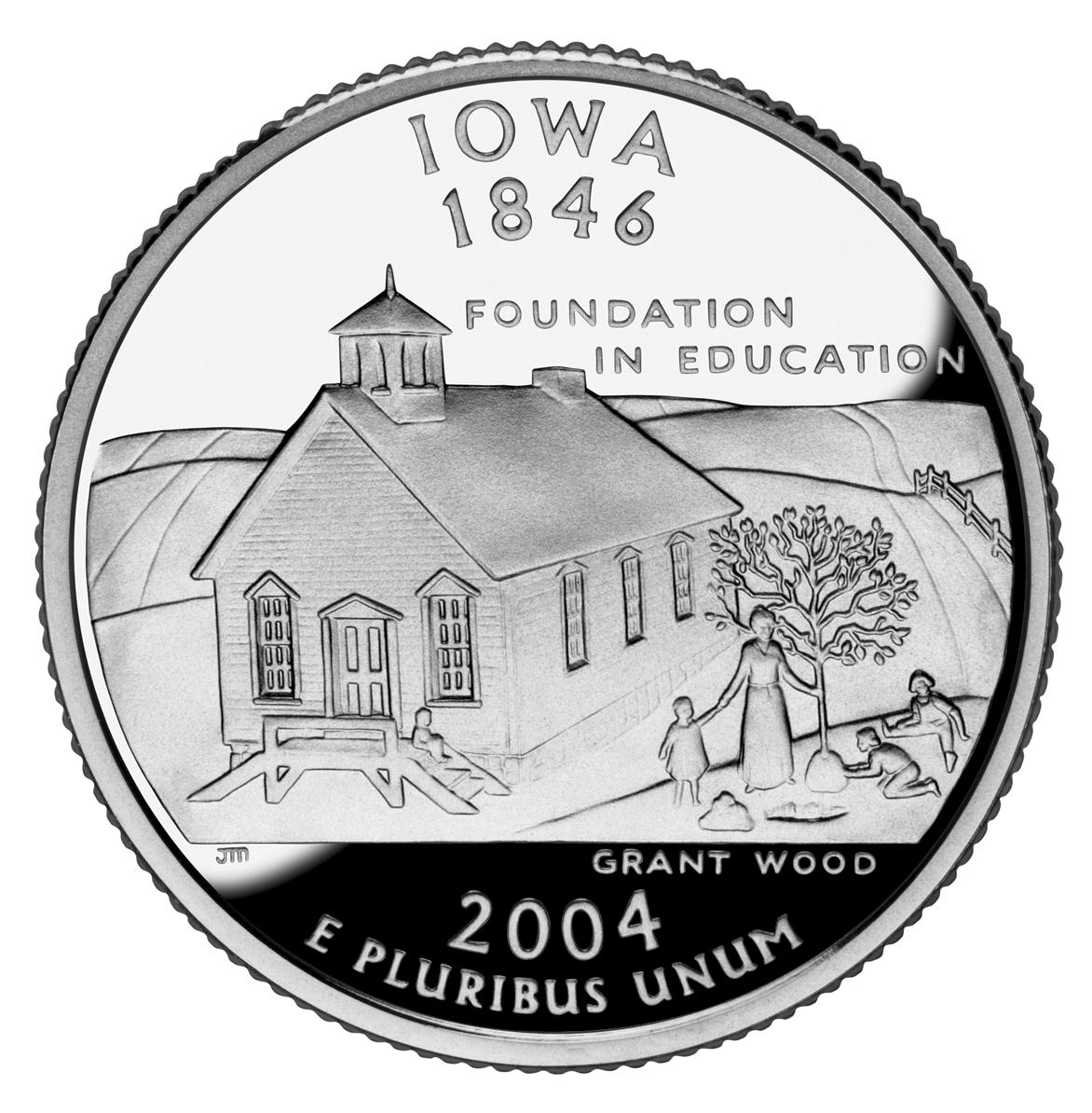
The 2004 Iowa state quarter honors Grant Wood with elements including the Schoolhouse, teacher and students planting a tree, and the caption "Foundation in Education".

Wood was an active painter from an extremely young age until his death. Although best known for his paintings, Wood also worked in a large number of media, including lithography, ink, charcoal, ceramics, metal, wood and found objects.

Throughout his life, Wood provided work for many Iowa-based businesses as a steady source of income. This included painting advertisements, sketching rooms of a mortuary house for promotional flyers and, in one case, designing the corn-themed décor (including chandelier) for the dining room of a hotel.

=== Regionalism ===
Wood is associated with the American movement of Regionalism, which was primarily situated in the Midwest, and advanced figurative painting of rural American themes in an aggressive rejection of European abstraction.

Wood was one of three artists most associated with the movement. The others, John Steuart Curry and Thomas Hart Benton, returned to the Midwest in the 1930s due to Wood's encouragement and assistance with locating teaching positions for them at colleges in Wisconsin and Missouri, respectively. Along with Benton, Curry, and other Regionalist artists, his work was marketed through Associated American Artists in New York for many years. Wood is considered the patron artist of Cedar Rapids, and his childhood country school is depicted on the 2004 Iowa State Quarter.

=== American Gothic ===
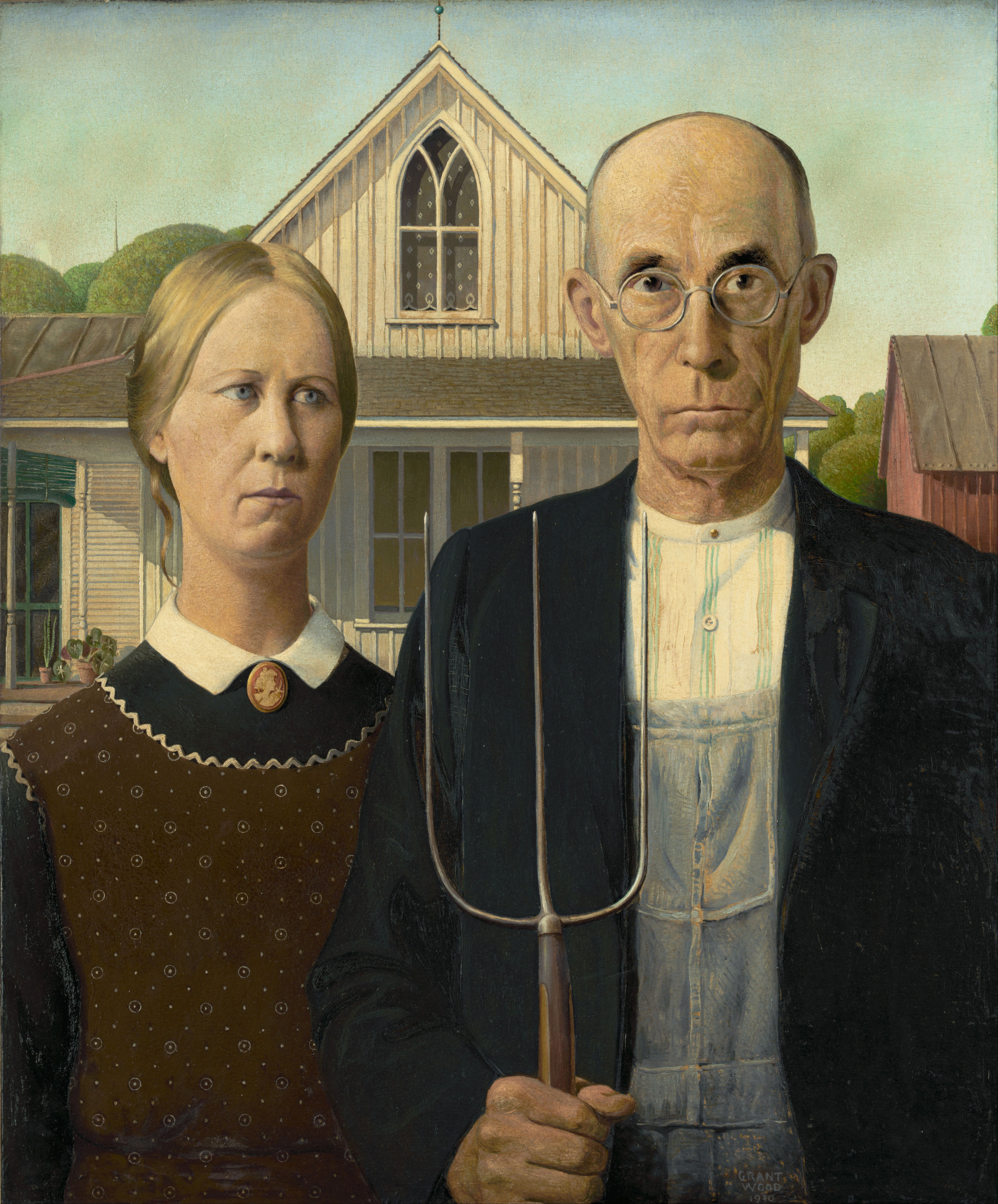
Grant Wood, American Gothic (1930), Art Institute of Chicago

Wood's best known work is his 1930 painting American Gothic, which is also one of the most famous paintings in American art, and one of the few images to reach the status of widely recognized cultural icon, comparable to Leonardo da Vinci's Mona Lisa and Edvard Munch's The Scream.

American Gothic was first exhibited in 1930 at the Art Institute of Chicago, where it is still located. It was awarded a $300 prize and made news stories nationwide, bringing Wood immediate recognition. Since then, it has been borrowed and satirized endlessly for advertisements and cartoons.

Art critics who had favorable opinions about the painting, such as Gertrude Stein and Christopher Morley, assumed the painting was meant to be a satire of repression and narrow-mindedness of rural small-town life. It was seen as part of the trend toward increasingly critical depictions of rural America, along the lines of such novels as Sherwood Anderson's 1919 Winesburg, Ohio, Sinclair Lewis's 1920 Main Street, and Carl Van Vechten's The Tattooed Countess. Wood rejected this reading of it. With the onset of the Great Depression, it came to be seen as a depiction of steadfast American pioneer spirit. Another reading is that it is an ambiguous fusion of reverence and parody.

Wood's inspiration came from Eldon, southern Iowa, where a cottage designed in the Gothic Revival style with an upper window in the shape of a medieval pointed arch provided the background and also the painting's title. Wood decided to paint the house along with "the kind of people I fancied should live in that house." The painting shows a farmer standing beside his spinster daughter, figures modeled by the artist's sister, Nan (1900–1990), and his dentist. Wood's sister insisted that the painting depicts the farmer's daughter, disliking suggestions it was the farmer's wife, since that would mean that she looked older than she preferred to think of herself. The dentist, Dr. Byron McKeeby (1867–1950), was from Cedar Rapids. The couple are in the traditional roles of men and women, the man's pitchfork symbolizing hard labor. The woman is dressed in a dark print apron mimicking 19th-century Americana with a cameo brooch.

The compositional severity and detailed technique derive from Northern Renaissance paintings, which Wood had seen during his visits to Europe; after this he became increasingly aware of the Midwest's own legacy, which also informed the work. It is a key image of Regionalism.

In 1940, Wood and eight other prominent American artists were hired to document and interpret dramatic scenes and characters during the production of the film The Long Voyage Home, a cinematic adaptation of Eugene O'Neill's plays.

== Personal life ==
Wood was married to Sara Sherman Maxon from 1935 to 1938. Friends considered the marriage a mistake for him.

Wood was a closeted homosexual. There was an unsuccessful attempt by a colleague, Lester Longman, to get him fired both on explicit moral grounds and for his advocacy of regionalism. Critic Janet Maslin states that his friends knew him to be "homosexual and a bit facetious in his masquerade as an overall-clad farm boy." University administration at Iowa dismissed the allegations, and Wood would have returned as a professor if not for his growing health problems.

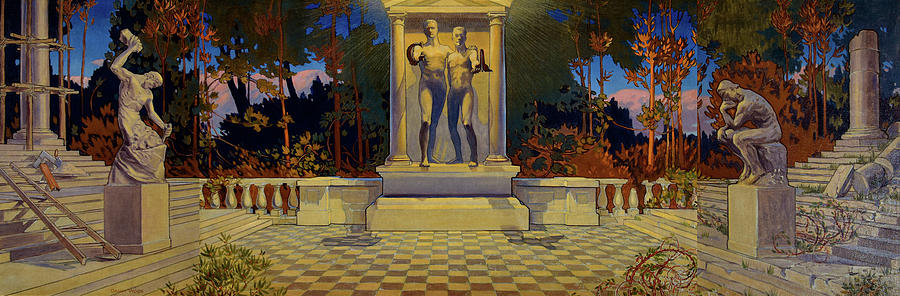
The First Three Degrees of Freemasonry – Grant Wood 1921

Wood was a Freemason and Member of Mount Hermon Lodge #263 in Cedar Rapids, Iowa, from 1921 to 1924. After receiving his third Degree of Master Mason he painted The First Three Degrees of Freemasonry in 1921. However, he was suspended for not paying dues in March 1924, and had no further association with the organization.

On February 12, 1942, Wood died at Iowa City University Hospital of pancreatic cancer, one day before his 51st birthday. Wood is buried at Riverside Cemetery in Anamosa, Iowa.

== Legacy ==
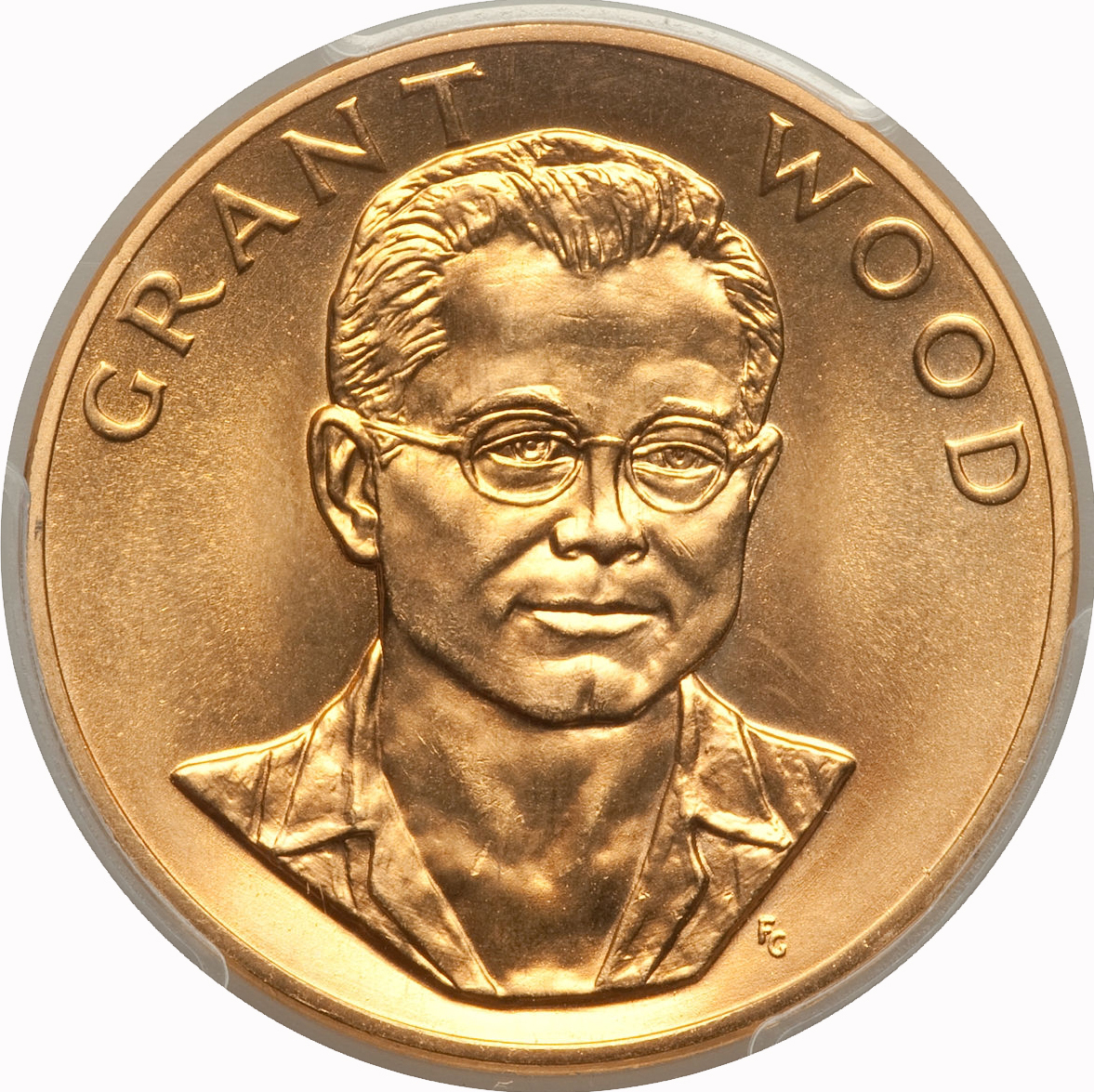
1980 Grant Wood one ounce American Arts Commemorative Series gold medallion

When Wood died, his estate went to his sister, Nan Wood Graham, the woman portrayed in American Gothic. When she died in 1990, her estate, along with Wood's personal effects and various works of art, became the property of the Figge Art Museum in Davenport, Iowa.

The World War II Liberty Ship SS Grant Wood was named in his honor.

One of Iowa's nine regional Area Education Agencies, Grant Wood Area Education Agency was established in 1974 and serves Eastern Iowa.

In 2009, Grant was awarded the Iowa Prize, the state's highest citizen honor.

The Grant Wood Art Colony grew out of Jim Hayes's 1975 purchase of Wood's historic Iowa City home at 1142 Court Street. The house was placed on the National Register of Historic Places in 1978 and was featured in the 2016 documentary, 1142: Beyond the Bricks. Over the years, Hayes purchased four land parcels behind the home. This addition led to the expansion of his vision for 1142 to include a rotating community of artists modeled after the colonies that Wood tried to establish in his lifetime such as the one at Stone City. Hayes partnered with the University of Iowa on his vision, and since 2011, the Grant Wood Art Colony holds a recurring symposium and hosts artist fellows in painting & drawing, printmaking, and interdisciplinary performance. The fellows are provided with furnished living quarters in the houses behind 1142.

== Gallery ==
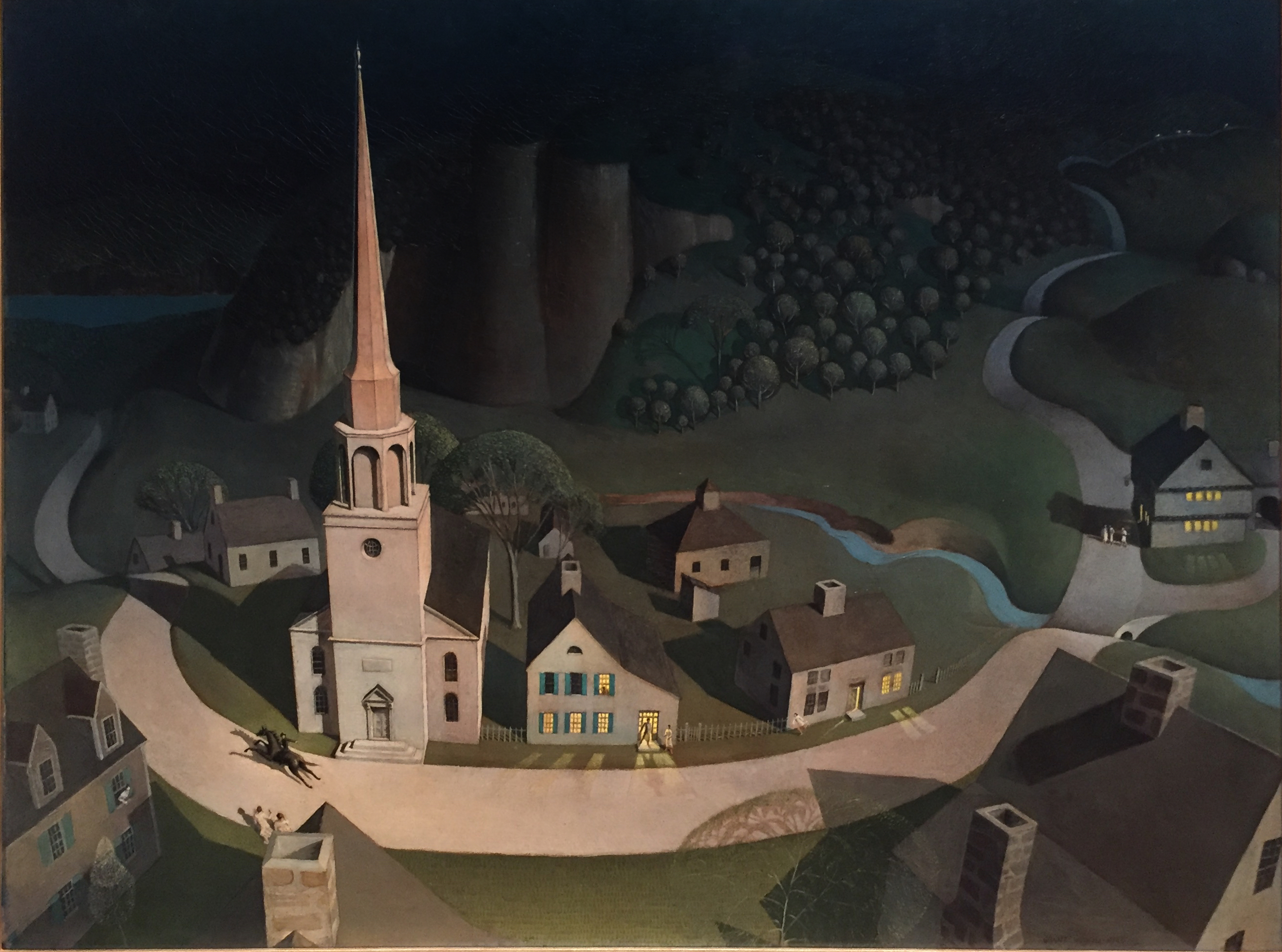
The Midnight Ride of Paul Revere, 1931, Metropolitan Museum of Art

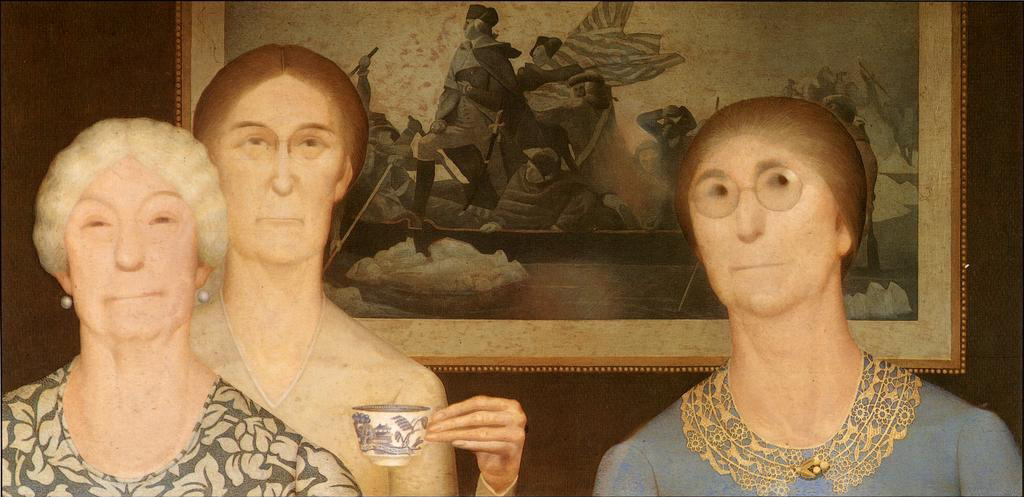
Daughters of Revolution, 1932, Cincinnati Art Museum

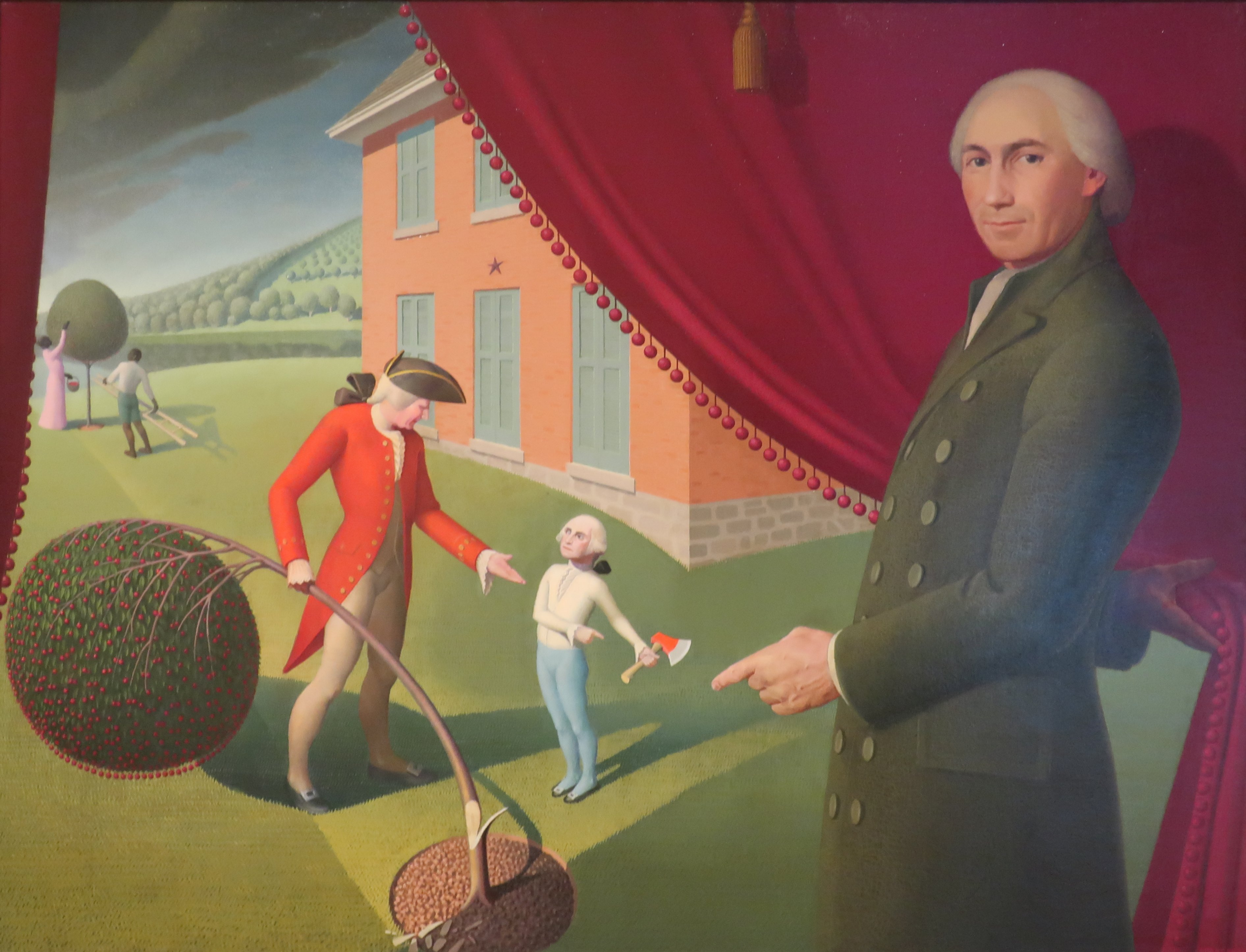
Parson Weems' Fable, 1939, Amon Carter Museum

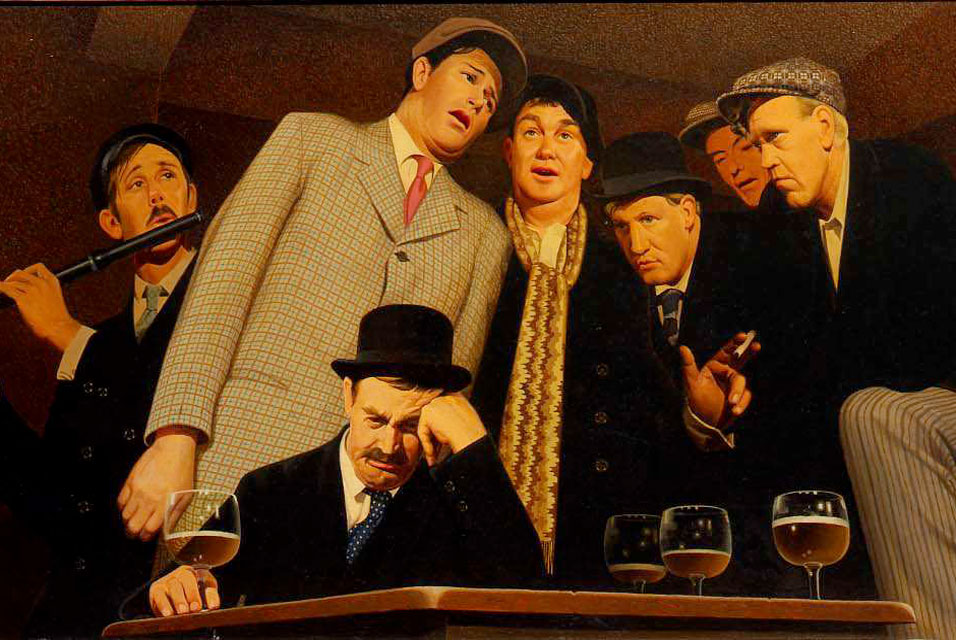
Sentimental Ballad, 1940, New Britain Museum

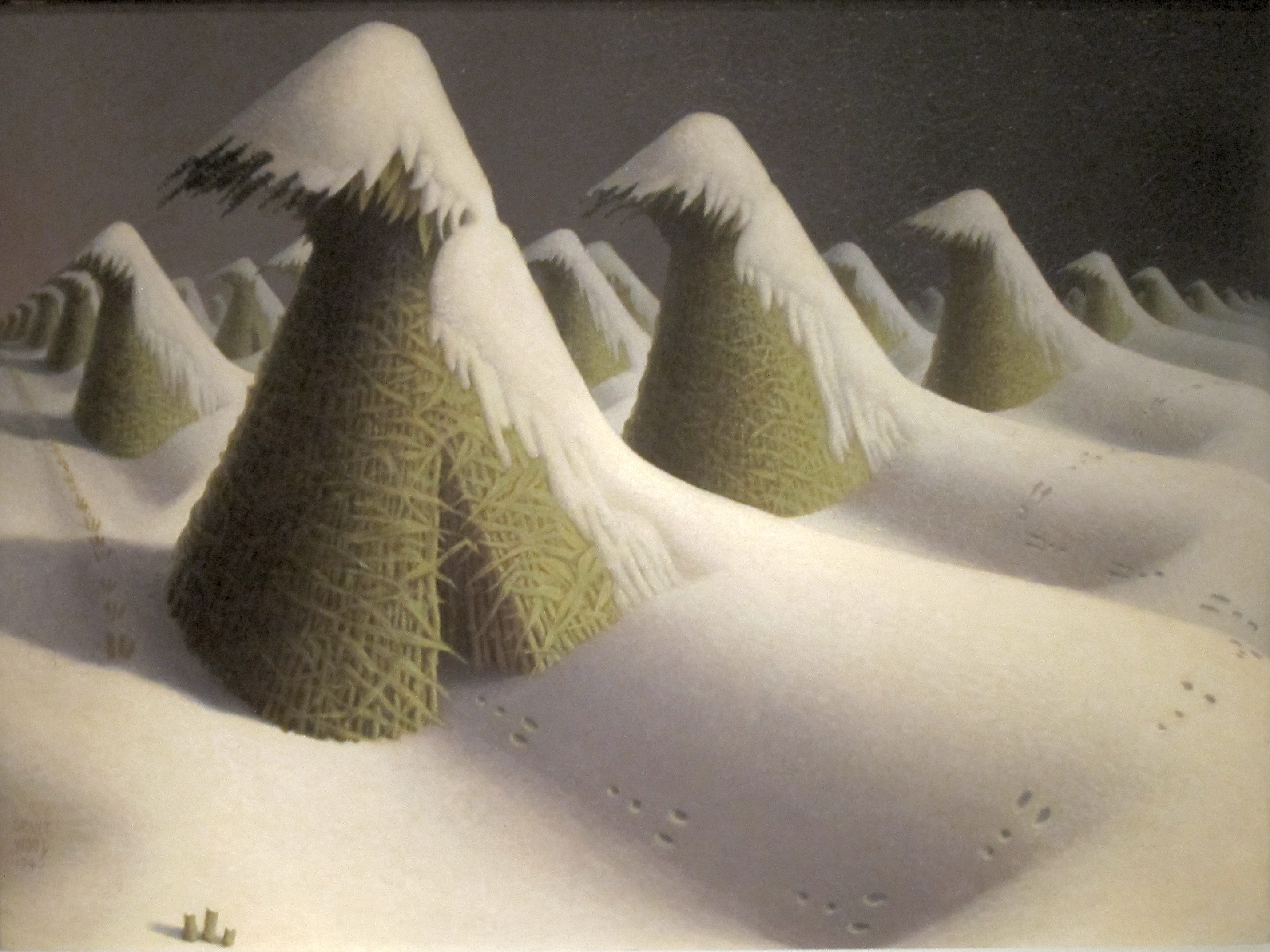
January, 1940–41, Cleveland Museum of Art

== Works ==
=== Paintings ===
- Spotted Man (1924)
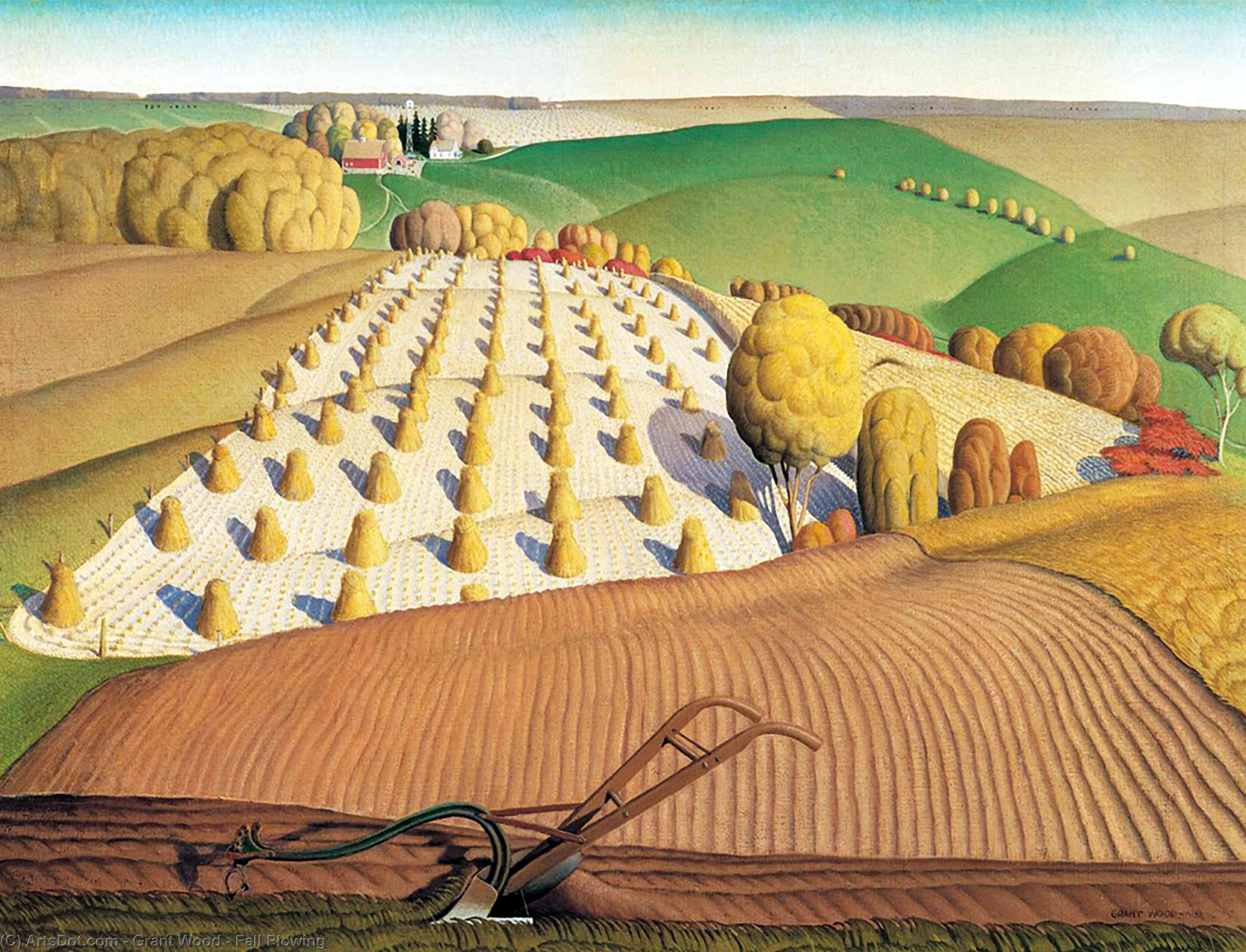
- Fall Plowing, Grant Wood
  The Little Chapel Chancelade (1926)
- Woman with Plants (1929)
- American Gothic (1930)
- Arnold Comes of Age (1930)
- Stone City, Iowa (1930)
- Appraisal (1931)
- Young Corn (1931)
- Fall Plowing (1931)
- The Birthplace of Herbert Hoover, West Branch, Iowa (1931)
- The Midnight Ride of Paul Revere (1931)
- Plaid Sweater (1931)
- Self-Portrait (1932)
- Arbor Day (1932)
- Boy Milking Cow (1932)
- Daughters of Revolution (1932)
- Portrait of Nan (1933)
- Near Sundown (1933)
- Dinner for Threshers (1934)
- Return from Bohemia (1935)
- Death on Ridge Road (1935)
- Spring Turning (1936)
- The Good Influence (1936)
- Seedtime and Harvest (1937)
- Sultry Night (1937)
- Haying (1939)
- New Road (1939)
- Parson Weems' Fable (1939)
- January (1940)
- Iowa Cornfield (1941)
- Spring in the Country (1941)

=== Writing ===
- Wood, Grant. "Art in the Daily Life of the Child." Rural America, March 1940, 7–9.
- Revolt against the City. Iowa City: Clio Press, 1935.
