= List of songs recorded by Newsboys =

This is a list of Newsboys songs. Note all personnel listed simply as Taylor refer to Steve Taylor. Contributions from Sean Taylor are listed with his given name.

Title	Year	Album	Other release(s)	Songwriter(s)	Lead vocal(s)	Christian peak	AC peak	CHR peak	Rock peak
"He's Coming Back"	1987	Read All About It	He's Coming Back (demo)	Perdikis (music), Sean Taylor (music), James (lyrics), Furler (lyrics)	James	—	—	—	—
"Listen for the Shout"	1987	Read All About It	He's Coming Back (demo)	Perdikis (music), Sean Taylor (music), James (lyrics), Furler (lyrics)	James	—	—	—	—
"Stand Up for Jesus"	1987	Hell Is for Wimps	He's Coming Back (demo)	Perdikis (music), Sean Taylor (music), James (lyrics), Furler (lyrics)	James	—	—	—	—
"You're Still There"	1987	Read All About It	He's Coming Back (demo)	James	James	—	—	—	—
"Victory"	1987	Hell Is for Wimps	He's Coming Back (demo)	Perdikis (music), Sean Taylor (music), James (lyrics), Furler (lyrics)	James	—	—	—	—
"It's Joy"	1987	Read All About It	He's Coming Back (demo)	Sean Taylor, Furler, James	James	—	—	—	—
"Read All About It"	1987	Read All About It	He's Coming Back (demo)	Furler, Perdikis, James	James	—	—	—	—
"He Died for You"	1987	—	He's Coming Back (demo)	Perdikis (music), Sean Taylor (music), James (lyrics), Furler (lyrics)	James	—	—	—	—
"I Got Your Number"	1988	Read All About It	Shine: The Hits	Furler, James, Sean Taylor, Perdikis	James	—	—	—	16
"Lighthouse"	1988	Read All About It	—	Sean Taylor, Perdikis, Furler	James	—	—	—	—
"Hold on Tight"	1988	Read All About It	—	Perdikis, Sean Taylor, Furler	James	—	—	—	—
"Never Surrender"	1988	Read All About It	—	Perdikis, James, Furler	James	—	—	—	—
"The Big Time"	1988	Read All About It	—	Tommy Simms, Perdikis, Sean Taylor, Furler, James	James	—	—	—	—
"In the End"	1990	Hell Is for Wimps	Ultimate Rock	Newsboys	James	—	—	—	5
"Simple Man"	1990	Hell Is for Wimps	—	Newsboys	James	—	—	13	—
"All I Can See"	1990	Hell Is for Wimps	—	Newsboys	James	—	—	22	—
"Ten Thousand Miles"	1990	Hell Is for Wimps	—	Newsboys	James	—	—	—	16
"Somethin's Missing"	1990	Hell Is for Wimps	—	Newsboys	James	—	—	—	—
"Get Up for Love"	1990	Hell Is for Wimps	—	Newsboys	James	—	—	—	—
"Sea of Love"	1990	Hell Is for Wimps	—	Newsboys	James	—	—	—	—
"Love You Tomorrow"	1990	Hell Is for Wimps	—	Newsboys	James	—	—	—	—
"Kingdom Man"	1991	Boys Will Be Boyz	—	Furler	James	—	—	—	11
"You and Me"	1991	Boys Will Be Boyz	—	Furler	James	—	—	—	—
"One Heart"	1991	Boys Will Be Boyz	—	Furler	James (vocals), Furler (rap)	—	—	2	—
"Turn"	1991	Boys Will Be Boyz	—	Furler	James	—	—	—	—
"Precious Love"	1991	Boys Will Be Boyz	—	Furler	James	—	—	—	—
"Taste and See"	1991	Boys Will Be Boyz	—	Furler	James (vocals), Furler (rap)	—	—	—	—
"Not Stand Silent"	1991	Boys Will Be Boyz	—	Furler	James	—	—	—	—
"Sing Aloud"	1991	Boys Will Be Boyz	—	Furler	James	—	—	—	—
"Stay with Me"	1991	Boys Will Be Boyz	—	Furler	James	—	—	6	—
"Israel"	1991	Boys Will Be Boyz	—	Furler	James	—	—	—	11
"Taste and See (Remix)"	1991	Boys Will Be Boyz	—	Furler	James (vocals), Furler (rap)	—	—	—	—
"I Cannot Get You Out of My System"	1992	Not Ashamed	The Best of Newsboys: 10 Best Series	Bishop, Furler, Taylor	Furler	—	—	—	16
"I'm Not Ashamed"	1992	Not Ashamed	Songs 4 Life: Lift Your Spirit; Entertaining Angels (remix); Live: One Night in Pennsylvania (live video); Pass It On: Leaving a Legacy for a Lifetime; WOW Gold; Shine: The Hits (Extended House Mix); 8 Great Hits; The Greatest Hits; Live: Houston We Are Go (live, as part of "B Stage Medley"); The Ultimate Collection; My Newsboys Playlist; 10 Great Songs; Icon	Furler, Taylor	James, Furler	—	36	1	—
"Where You Belong/Turn Your Eyes Upon Jesus"	1992	Not Ashamed	Romantic Rock Vol. 4; Shine: The Hits; Hallelujah for the Cross (vocals: Tait)	Furler, Helen H. Hemmel, Taylor	James, Furler	—	10	9	—
"Upon This Rock"	1992	Not Ashamed	—	Furler, Dwight Liles, Pryor, P. Taylor, Taylor	James	—	—	4	—
"Strong Love"	1992	Not Ashamed	The Best of Newsboys: 10 Best Series	Furler, McKeehan, Taylor	Furler	—	10	—	—
"Dear Shame"	1992	Not Ashamed	"Take Me to Your Leader" [Single]	Furler, Taylor	James, Furler	—	—	11	—
"Boycott Hell"	1992	Not Ashamed	—	DeGarmo, Key, Furler, Taylor	James, Furler	—	—	—	—
"We Come Together"	1992	Not Ashamed	—	Furler, Taylor	Furler	—	—	—	—
"Love Comes True"	1992	Not Ashamed	—	Furler, Taylor	James	—	—	—	—
"Lost the Sky Again"	1992	Not Ashamed	—	Furler, Taylor	Taylor, Furler	—	—	—	—
"Real Good Thing"	1994	Going Public	Newsboys: The Going Public Tour; The Best of Newsboys: 10 Best Series; The Greatest Hits	Taylor (lyrics), Furler (lyrics, music), Davis (music)	Furler	—	—	1	—
"Shine"	1994	Going Public	Newsboys: The Going Public Tour; WOW 1996; "Take Me to Your Leader" (Single) (Tom Lord-Alge Remix); Dove Awards Collection: 27th Dove Awards, 1996; More Than Gold: A Christian Music Tribute; Entertaining Angels ("Shine 2000" Remix); The Simply Xcellent New Music Sampler ("Shine 2000" Remix); WOW The 90s; Power Jams (Sequential Mix); Live: One Night in Pennsylvania (live video); Stadium Jam' (live); Shine: The Hits (Tom Lord-Alge Remix); Thrive: From the Rock and Roll Hall of Fame and Museum (live); Newsboys Remixed (YZ250F Mix); 8 Great Hits; The Best of Newsboys: 10 Best Series; Top Five; The Greatest Hits; Live: Houston We Are Go (live); The Ultimate Collection; Boomin' (remix); Discover: 6 Essential Songs; My Newsboys Playlist; Back 2 Back Hits: Adoration/The Greatest Hits; 10 Great Songs; Icon	Taylor (lyrics), Furler (music)	Furler	—	—	1	—
"Spirit Thing"	1994	Going Public	Live: One Night in Pennsylvania (live video); Shine: The Hits; The Greatest Hits; The Ultimate Collection	Taylor (lyrics), Furler (lyrics, music)	Furler	—	—	1	—
"Let It Rain"	1994	Going Public	Romantic Rock Vol. 6	Taylor (lyrics), Furler (lyrics, music)	Furler	—	21	7	—
"Going Public"	1994	Going Public	—	Taylor (lyrics), Furler (music)	James	—	—	—	—
"Truth and Consequences"	1994	Going Public	Newsboys: The Going Public Tour; Thru the Roof; Right from Wrong	Taylor (lyrics), Furler (music)	Furler	—	—	1	—
"Lights Out"	1994	Going Public	—	Taylor (lyrics), Furler (music)	James	—	—	—	3
"Be Still"	1994	Going Public	—	Taylor (lyrics), Furler (lyrics, music)	James	—	14	2	—
"When You Called My Name"	1994	Going Public	—	Taylor (lyrics), Furler (lyrics, music)	James	—	—	—	—
"Elle G."	1994	Going Public	Newsboys: The Going Public Tour; A Little on the CD Side: Volume 15	Taylor (lyrics), Furler (music), Wade Jaynes (music)	Furler	—	—	—	—
"God Is Not a Secret"	1996	Take Me to Your Leader	Pulz: 15 Rock Alternatives	Taylor (lyrics), Furler (lyrics, music)	Furler	—	—	—	2
"God Is Not a Secret"	2000	re-recording featuring TobyMac: Shine: The Hits	Festival Con Dios	Taylor (lyrics), Furler (lyrics, music), McKeehan (lyrics)	Furler (vocals), TobyMac (rap)	—	—	—	12
"Take Me to Your Leader"	1996	Take Me to Your Leader	"Take Me to Your Leader" (Single) (album version + Vocal Space Mix); CD Aircheck Vol. 21: Reinvention; WOW 1997; Live: One Night in Pennsylvania (live video); Shine: The Hits; Thrive: From the Rock and Roll Hall of Fame and Museum (live); 8 Great Hits; The Greatest Hits; The Ultimate Collection; 10 Great Songs; Icon	Taylor (lyrics), Furler (music)	James (verses), Joel (chorus)	—	37	1	—
"Breathe"	1996	Take Me to Your Leader	WWJD	Joel (lyrics), Furler (lyrics, music)	Furler	—	—	—	1
"Reality"	1996	Take Me to Your Leader	Hear & Beyond; WOW 1998; Live: One Night in Pennsylvania (live video); Shine: The Hits; 8 Great Hits; The Greatest Hits; Live: Houston We Are Go (live, as part of "B Stage Medley")	Taylor (lyrics), Furler (lyrics, music)	James (verses), Furler (chorus)	—	9	1	—
"Breakfast"	1996	Take Me to Your Leader	Live: One Night in Pennsylvania (live video); Shine: The Hits; Thrive: From the Rock and Roll Hall of Fame and Museum (live); 8 Great Hits; The Best of Newsboys: 10 Best Series; The Greatest Hits; Live: Houston We Are Go (live); The Ultimate Collection; Discover: 6 Essential Songs; My Newsboys Playlist; Back 2 Back Hits: Adoration/The Greatest Hits; 10 Great Songs; Icon	Taylor (lyrics), Furler (music)	Furler	—	—	4	—
"Let It Go"	1996	Take Me to Your Leader	High Fidelity Reference-CD No. 25; The Best of Newsboys: 10 Best Series	Taylor (lyrics), Furler (lyrics, music), Frankenstein (music)	Furler (verses), Joel (chorus)	—	4	1	—
"Cup O' Tea"	1996	Take Me to Your Leader	Live: One Night in Pennsylvania (live video)	Furler (lyrics, music), Joel (lyrics)	Furler	—	—	—	1
"It's All Who You Know"	1996	Take Me to Your Leader	—	Taylor (lyrics), Furler (music)	Furler, James	—	—	6	—
"Miracle Child"	1996	Take Me to Your Leader	—	Taylor (lyrics), Furler (lyrics, music), Davis (music)	James	—	—	—	—
"Lost the Plot"	1996	Take Me to Your Leader	Seltzer 2	Taylor (lyrics), Furler (lyrics, music)	Furler	—	—	—	2
"Breathe (Benediction)"	1996	Take Me to Your Leader	—	Joel (lyrics), Furler (lyrics, music)	Joel	—	—	2	—
"Entertaining Angels"	1998	Step Up to the Microphone	Entertaining Angels (album version + Light Mix + Alternate Mix); The Simply Xcellent New Music Sampler; Life on the Edge; WOW 1999; Live: One Night in Pennsylvania (live video); The Joyriders (Soundtrack); Stadium Jam (live); Shine: The Hits; Extreme Days (Soundtrack); Thrive: From the Rock and Roll Hall of Fame and Museum (live); Newsboys Remixed (O2R Mix); 8 Great Hits; The Greatest Hits; Live: Houston We Are Go (live); The Ultimate Collection; Discover: 6 Essential Songs; My Newsboys Playlist; Back 2 Back Hits: Adoration/The Greatest Hits; Icon	Davis, Furler, Joel	Joel (verses, chorus), Furler (chorus)	—	32	1	—
"Truth Be Known – Everybody Gets a Shot"	1998	Step Up to the Microphone	Entertaining Angels ("Untitled Studio Rough"); Live: One Night in Pennsylvania (live video)	Furler, Joel, Taylor	Furler, Joel, Davis	—	—	—	—
"WooHoo"	1998	Step Up to the Microphone	Live: One Night in Pennsylvania (live video); Shine: The Hits; The Ultimate Collection	Furler, Joel	Joel	—	—	1	20
"Step Up to the Microphone"	1998	Step Up to the Microphone	Live: One Night in Pennsylvania (live video); Shine: The Hits; 8 Great Hits; The Ultimate Collection; 10 Great Songs	Frankenstein, Furler, Joel	Furler	—	—	1	—
"Believe"	1998	Step Up to the Microphone	Live: One Night in Pennsylvania (live video); Shine: The Hits	Furler, Joel	Furler	—	6	1	—
"Tuning In"	1998	Step Up to the Microphone	See You at the Pole: We Bow Down	Furler, Joel, Taylor	Furler	—	—	—	—
"Deep End"	1998	Step Up to the Microphone	—	Davis, Frankenstein, Furler, Joel	Furler	—	—	—	—
"Hallelujah"	1998	Step Up to the Microphone	Listen Louder (Illumination Remix); Live: One Night in Pennsylvania (live video)	Frankenstein, Furler, Joel	Furler	—	—	—	4
"The Tide"	1998	Step Up to the Microphone	—	Furler, Joel	Furler	—	—	—	—
"Always"	1998	Step Up to the Microphone	Live: One Night in Pennsylvania (live video); The Best of Newsboys: 10 Best Series	Furler, Joel	Furler	—	—	—	—
"Great Is Thy Faithfulness" (with Vestal Goodman)	1999	Vestal & Friends	—	William Runyan, traditional	Joel, Vestal Goodman	—	—	—	—
"Beautiful Sound"	1999	Love Liberty Disco	WOW Hits 2001; Newsboys Remixed (Below the Radar Mix); The Best of Newsboys: 10 Best Series; He Reigns: The Worship Collection; The Ultimate Collection; 10 Great Songs; Icon	Furler, Joel	Furler (lead), Joel (harmony)	—	6	1	—
"Love Liberty Disco"	1999	Love Liberty Disco	WOW 2000; Newsboys Remixed (All Mixed Up Mix); Live: Houston We Are Go (live, as part of "B Stage Medley"); The Ultimate Collection	Furler, Frankenstein, Davis, Joel, Phillips	Furler	—	—	5	—
"Forever Man"	1999	Love Liberty Disco	—	Furler, Joel	Furler	—	—	—	—
"Good Stuff"	1999	Love Liberty Disco	Newsboys Remixed (NYC Mix); The Best of Newsboys: 10 Best Series	Furler, Joel	Joel	—	—	1	14
"Everyone's Someone"	1999	Love Liberty Disco	Metamorphosis: Mission Adventures – Youth with a Mission	Furler, Joel	Furler	—	—	—	—
"Say You Need Love"	1999	Love Liberty Disco	—	Furler, Joel	Furler	—	—	—	—
"I Would Give Everything"	1999	Love Liberty Disco	—	Furler, Joel	Furler	—	—	—	—
"Break"	1999	Love Liberty Disco	—	Furler, Joel	Furler	—	—	—	—
"I Surrender All"	1999	Love Liberty Disco	50 Years of the Happy Goodmans (live, with the Happy Goodmans)	Furler, John P. Kee	Furler	—	—	—	—
"Fall on You"	1999	Love Liberty Disco	The Best of Newsboys: 10 Best Series	Furler, Joel	Furler	—	—	—	—
"Joy"	2000	Shine: The Hits	WOW Hits 2002; Thrive: From the Rock and Roll Hall of Fame and Museum (live); Newsboys Remixed (Let's Be Frank Mix); 8 Great Hits; The Greatest Hits; The Ultimate Collection; My Newsboys Playlist; Back 2 Back Hits: Adoration/The Greatest Hits; Seasons of Joy; Icon	Taylor (lyrics), Furler (lyrics, music)	Furler	—	1	1	—
"Praises"	2000	Shine: The Hits	Adoration: The Worship Album ("Take My Hands (Praises)")	Taylor (lyrics), Furler (lyrics, music), McKeehan (lyrics)	Furler	—	—	—	—
"Who?"	2000	Shine: The Hits	Thrive: From the Rock and Roll Hall of Fame and Museum (live); The Ultimate Collection	Taylor (lyrics), Furler (lyrics, music)	Furler	—	—	1	—
"Mega-Mix" ("Shine"/"WooHoo"/"Take Me to Your Leader"/"Breakfast"/"Reality"/"Entertaining Angels"/"Step Up to the Microphone"/"I'm Not Ashamed")	2000	Shine: The Hits	Newsboys Remixed	Taylor (lyrics), Furler (lyrics, music), Joel (lyrics, music), Davis (lyrics, music), Frankenstein (lyrics, music)	Furler, Joel, James	—	—	17	—
"Giving It Over"	2002	Thrive	Thrive: From the Rock and Roll Hall of Fame and Museum (live); Cross Rhythms Experience 20; Sonic Fuel: New Music Sampler	Taylor (lyrics), Furler (lyrics, music)	Furler	—	—	—	—
"Live in Stereo"	2002	Thrive	Thrive: From the Rock and Roll Hall of Fame and Museum (live)	Taylor (lyrics), Furler (music)	Furler	—	—	—	—
"Million Pieces (Kissin' Your Cares Goodbye)"	2002	Thrive	Thrive: From the Rock and Roll Hall of Fame and Museum (live); Newsboys Remixed (A Million and One Mix); Top Five; The Greatest Hits; The Ultimate Collection; My Newsboys Playlist; Back 2 Back Hits: Adoration/The Greatest Hits; Icon	Taylor (lyrics), Furler (music)	Furler	—	1	1	—
"Thrive"	2002	Thrive	Thrive: From the Rock and Roll Hall of Fame and Museum (live); Gesucht & gefunden; Newsboys Remixed (Is That James Dancing? Mix)	Taylor (lyrics), Furler (lyrics, music)	Furler	—	—	—	—
"Rescue"	2002	Thrive	Thrive: From the Rock and Roll Hall of Fame and Museum (live); Turn It Up: Sample the Best in Christian Pop; Newsboys Remixed (Helmet Mix)	Furler (lyrics, music), Taylor (lyrics), Joel (lyrics)	Furler	—	—	—	—
"It Is You"	2002	Thrive	Thrive: From the Rock and Roll Hall of Fame and Museum (live); Cross Rhythms Experience 19; Newsboys Remixed (UK Mix); WOW Hits 2003; Adoration: The Worship Album (live); Worship Together: Here I Am to Worship – 25 Worship Favorites; Worship Together Platinum; He Reigns: The Worship Collection; The Greatest Hits; The Ultimate Collection; Discover: 6 Essential Songs; My Newsboys Playlist; Back 2 Back Hits: Adoration/The Greatest Hits (live Adoration version); Icon	Furler	Furler	—	—	1	—
"Cornelius"	2002	Thrive	Gesucht & gefunden; Festival Con Dios Volume III	Taylor (lyrics), Furler (music)	Furler	—	—	—	—
"The Fad of the Land"	2002	Thrive	Thrive: From the Rock and Roll Hall of Fame and Museum (live); Newsboys Remixed (Lounge Mix)	Taylor (lyrics), Furler (music)	Furler	—	—	—	6
"John Woo"	2002	Thrive	X 2003	Taylor (lyrics, music), Furler (music)	Furler	—	—	—	—
"Lord (I Don't Know)"	2002	Thrive	Thrive: From the Rock and Roll Hall of Fame and Museum (live); Newsboys Remixed (Father B. Mix); Adoration: The Worship Album (live); He Reigns: The Worship Collection; Icon	Taylor (lyrics), Furler (lyrics, music)	Furler	—	—	—	—
"In the Belly of the Whale"	2002	Jonah: A VeggieTales Movie (Soundtrack)	Veggie Rocks!; The Greatest Hits; The Ultimate Collection; 10 Great Songs	Furler, Taylor	Furler	—	—	—	—
"He Reigns"	2003	Adoration: The Worship Album	WOW Hits 2003; Dove Hits 2004; More...Best Worship Songs Ever!; Worship Together: Here I Am to Worship 2 – 25 Worship Favorites; America's Choice 30: The Worship Songs Everyone Is Singing; Worship Together Platinum (video only); WOW #1s; He Reigns: The Worship Collection; WOW Worship: Aqua; The Ultimate Collection: Worship; Top Five; The Greatest Hits; Everlasting God: 25 Modern Worship Favorites; Live: Houston We Are Go (live); WOW Essentials; Walk & Worship; The Ultimate Collection; Discover: 6 Essential Songs; My Newsboys Playlist; Back 2 Back Hits: Adoration/The Greatest Hits; Live in Concert: God's Not Dead (live, vocals: Tait); Icon	Taylor (lyrics), Furler (lyrics, music)	Furler	4	1	1	—
"You Are My King (Amazing Love)"	2003	Adoration: The Worship Album	Worship Together: Here I Am to Worship – 25 Worship Favorites; WOW Hits 2005; He Reigns: The Worship Collection; The Ultimate Collection: Worship; Top Five; The Wonderful Cross; The Greatest Hits; Everlasting God: 25 Modern Worship Favorites; Live: Houston We Are Go (live, as part of "B Stage Medley"); The Ultimate Collection; Discover: 6 Essential Songs; My Newsboys Playlist; Back 2 Back Hits: Adoration/The Greatest Hits; 10 Great Songs	Billy James Foote	Furler	1	1	—	—
"Great Is Your Faithfulness"	2003	Adoration: The Worship Album	Back 2 Back Hits: Adoration/The Greatest Hits	Taylor (lyrics), Furler (lyrics, music)	Furler	—	—	—	—
"Take My Hands (Praises)"	2003	Adoration: The Worship Album	—	Furler (lyrics, music), Martin Smith (lyrics), Taylor (lyrics), McKeehan (lyrics),	Furler	—	—	—	—
"Adoration"	2003	Adoration: The Worship Album	Hear It First: New Music Sampler 2003; Back 2 Back Hits: Adoration/The Greatest Hits	Taylor (lyrics), Furler (music)	Furler	34	31	—	—
"In Christ Alone"	2003	Adoration: The Worship Album	He Reigns: The Worship Collection; Top Five; WOW Hymns; The Ultimate Collection; From the Inside Out; My Newsboys Playlist; Back 2 Back Hits: Adoration/The Greatest Hits; Mighty to Save; 10 Great Songs	Keith Getty, Stuart Townend	Furler	—	—	—	—
"Father, Blessed Father" (includes reprise from "Breathe")	2003	Adoration: The Worship Album	—	Furler (lyrics, music), Joel (lyrics)	Furler	—	—	—	—
"Hallelujah"	2003	Adoration: The Worship Album	—	Furler	Furler	—	—	—	—
"Devotion"	2004	Devotion	He Reigns: The Worship Collection; The Ultimate Collection; My Newsboys Playlist	Taylor (lyrics), Furler (lyrics, music)	Furler	16	16	—	—
"I Love Your Ways"	2004	Devotion	—	Taylor (lyrics), Furler (music), Frankenstein (music), Joel (music)	Furler	—	—	—	—
"Presence (My Heart's Desire)"	2004	Devotion	He Reigns: The Worship Collection; WOW Hits 2006	Furler (lyrics, music), Taylor (lyrics), Tim Hughes (lyrics)	Furler	4	4	10	—
"Strong Tower"	2004	Devotion	He Reigns: The Worship Collection	Taylor (lyrics), Furler (lyrics, music)	Furler	—	—	—	—
"God of Nations"	2004	Devotion	He Reigns: The Worship Collection; Building One World: The XX. World Youth Day Compilation	Taylor (lyrics), Furler (lyrics, music)	Furler	—	—	—	—
"Blessed Be Your Name" (featuring Rebecca St. James)	2004	Devotion	He Reigns: The Worship Collection; Live: Houston We Are Go (live); The Ultimate Collection; Christian Music's Best Worship; From the Inside Out; My Newsboys Playlist; 10 Great Songs	Matt Redman, Beth Redman, arr. Furler	Furler, Rebecca St. James	—	—	—	—
"The Orphan"	2004	Devotion	—	Taylor (lyrics), Furler (music), Frankenstein (music)	Furler	—	—	—	—
"Landslide of Love"	2004	Devotion	—	Taylor (lyrics), Furler (lyrics, music), Frankenstein (music)	Furler	—	—	—	—
"Name Above All Names"	2004	Devotion	—	Tim Hughes, arr. Furler	Furler	—	—	—	—
"When the Tears Fall"	2004	Devotion	—	Tim Hughes, arr. Furler	Furler	—	—	—	—
"Isaiah"	2005	Devotion (iTunes exclusive)	—	—	Furler	—	—	—	—
"I Am Free"	2006	Go	I Am Free: Worship Collection (live version); Go: Limited Edition (studio version + live version); WOW Hits 2007; iWorship Platinum; Go: Remixed (remix); Live: Houston We Are Go (live version 2); WOW Worship: Purple; Christian Workout Playlist; God's Not Dead: The Greatest Hits of the Newsboys	Jon Egan, Furler (2nd verse, bridge on studio version)	Furler	11	11	16	—
"Wherever We Go"	2006	Go	Go: Remixed (remix); The Greatest Hits; Live: Houston We Are Go (live); The Ultimate Collection; God's Not Dead: The Greatest Hits of the Newsboys	Furler, Joel, Taylor, Lynn Nichols, Tedd T.	Furler	3	15	—	—
"Go"	2006	Go	X 2007; Go: Remixed (remix)	Furler, Taylor, Tedd T.	Furler	—	—	—	—
"Something Beautiful"	2006	Go	Go: Remixed (remix); WOW Hits 2008; The Greatest Hits; Live: Houston We Are Go (live); The Ultimate Collection; Christian Music's Best Pop; Back 2 Back Hits: Adoration/The Greatest Hits; Live in Concert: God's Not Dead (live, vocals: Tait); God's Not Dead: The Greatest Hits of the Newsboys	Furler, Colman	Furler	4	6	1	—
"The Mission"	2006	Go	Go: Remixed (remix); Live: Houston We Are Go (live)	Furler, Taylor	Furler	—	—	—	—
"Let It All Come Out"	2006	Go	Go: Remixed (remix)	Furler	Furler	—	—	—	—
"In Wonder"	2006	Go	Go: Remixed (remix); WOW Hits 1; God's Not Dead: The Greatest Hits of the Newsboys	Ric Knott, Furler, Taylor	Furler	4	5	13	—
"Your Love Is Better Than Life"	2006	Go	Go: Remixed (remix); Live: Houston We Are Go (live)	Joel, Colman, Taylor, Furler, Summer Furler	Furler, Joel, Colman	—	—	—	—
"Secret Kingdom"	2006	Go	Go: Remixed (remix)	Furler, Taylor	Furler	—	—	—	—
"The Letter (One of a Kind)"	2006	Go	—	Furler	Furler	—	—	—	—
"Gonna Be Alright"	2006	Go	Go: Remixed (remix)	Furler, Colman, Tedd T.	Furler	—	—	—	—
"Something to Believe In"	2006	Go: Limited Edition	—	Furler, Joel, Tedd T.	Furler	—	—	—	—
"City to City"	2006	Go: Limited Edition	Go: Remixed (remix)	Furler, Joel, Colman, Tedd T.	Furler	—	—	—	—
"I Fought the La..."	2007	The Greatest Hits	The Ultimate Collection	Furler, Taylor, Tedd T.	Furler	—	—	—	—
"Stay Strong"	2007	The Greatest Hits	Live: Houston We Are Go (live); The Ultimate Collection	Furler, Taylor, Frankenstein	Furler	19	20	21	—
"Yo Ho Hero" (featuring Taylor)	2007	The Pirates Who Don't Do Anything: A VeggieTales Movie (Soundtrack)	—	Taylor	Furler, Taylor	—	—	—	—
"B Stage Medley" ("I'm Not Ashamed"/"Reality"/"Love Liberty Disco"/"You Are My King (Amazing Love)")	2008	Live: Houston We Are Go (live)	—	Furler, Taylor, Davis, Frankenstein, Joel, Phillips, Billy James Foote	Furler, Frankenstein, Colman	—	—	—	—
"Drum Solo"	2008	Live: Houston We Are Go (live)	—	Phillips	—	—	—	—	—
"Peter's Testimony" (spoken)	2008	Live: Houston We Are Go (live)	—	Furler	Furler	—	—	—	—
"The Way We Roll"	2009	In the Hands of God	—	Furler, Frankenstein, Taylor, Stuart Garrard	Furler	—	—	22	—
"No Grave"	2009	In the Hands of God	—	Furler, Frankenstein, Taylor	Furler	—	—	—	—
"This Is Your Life"	2009	In the Hands of God	—	Furler, Frankenstein, Taylor	Furler	—	—	—	—
"Glorious"	2009	In the Hands of God	Born Again: Miracles Edition (Michael Tait version)	Furler, Frankenstein, Taylor	Furler (album), Tait (single)	15	9	—	—
"In the Hands of God"	2009	In the Hands of God	WOW Hits 2010; God's Not Dead: The Greatest Hits of the Newsboys	Furler, Frankenstein, Taylor	Furler	3	1	12	—
"The Upside"	2009	In the Hands of God	—	Furler, Frankenstein, Taylor	Furler	—	—	—	—
"My Friend Jesus"	2009	In the Hands of God	—	Furler, Frankenstein, Taylor	Furler	—	—	—	—
"Lead Me to the Cross"	2009	In the Hands of God	—	Brooke Fraser	Furler	—	—	—	—
"Dance"	2009	In the Hands of God	—	Furler, Frankenstein, Taylor	Furler	—	—	—	—
"RSL 1984"	2009	In the Hands of God	—	Furler, Taylor	Furler	—	—	—	—
"Born Again"	2010	Born Again	Born Again EP; WOW Hits 2011; Born Again: Miracles Edition (original version + French Horn Rebellion Remix); Live in Concert: God's Not Dead (live); God's Not Dead: The Greatest Hits of the Newsboys	Tait, Wes Campbell, Seth Mosley, Juan Otero	Tait	2	2	1	—
"On Your Knees"	2010	Born Again	Born Again EP; Born Again: Miracles Edition	Tait, Dale Bray, Wes Campbell, Seth Mosley, Juan Otero, Jacob Rye	Tait	—	—	—	—
"When the Boys Light Up"	2010	Born Again	Born Again EP; Born Again: Miracles Edition	James Reyne, Taylor, Tait, Wes Campbell, Seth Mosley, Juan Otero	Tait	—	—	—	—
"I'll Be"	2010	Born Again: Miracles Edition	Born Again EP; Born Again: Miracles Edition	Seth Mosley, Juan Otero	Tait	32	—	—	—
"One Shot"	2010	Born Again	Born Again EP; Born Again: Miracles Edition	Tait, Wes Campbell, Seth Mosley, Juan Otero	Tait	—	—	—	—
"Way Beyond Myself"	2010	Born Again	Born Again: Miracles Edition (original version + Flatline Remix)	Tait, Wes Campbell, Seth Mosley, Juan Otero	Tait	25	—	1	—
"Impossible"	2010	Born Again	—	Theron Thomas, Timothy Thomas, Seth Mosley, Juan Otero	Tait	—	—	—	—
"Build Us Back"	2010	Born Again	Born Again: Miracles Edition	Mark Stuart, Jason Walker	Tait	—	—	—	—
"Escape"	2010	Born Again	Born Again: Miracles Edition; Live in Concert: God's Not Dead (live)	Taylor, Tait, Wes Campbell, Seth Mosley, Juan Otero	Tait	—	—	—	—
"Miracles"	2010	Born Again	Born Again: Miracles Edition (original version + Mega Is a Gang Remix); Live in Concert: God's Not Dead (live)	Tait, Wes Campbell, Seth Mosley, Juan Otero	Tait	—	—	—	—
"Running to You"	2010	Born Again	Born Again: Miracles Edition	Tait, Wes Campbell, Seth Mosley, Juan Otero	Tait	—	—	—	—
"Mighty to Save"	2010	Born Again	Born Again: Miracles Edition (original version + Family Force 5 Remix); God's Not Dead; Live in Concert: God's Not Dead (live); God's Not Dead: The Greatest Hits of the Newsboys	Reuben Morgan, Ben Fielding	Tait	—	—	—	—
"Jesus Freak" (feat. KJ-52)	2010	Born Again	Born Again: Miracles Edition; Live in Concert: God's Not Dead (live, without KJ-52)	McKeehan, Mark Heimermann	Tait, KJ-52 (rap on studio version)	—	—	—	—
"We Remember" (featuring Israel Houghton)	2010	Born Again: Miracles Edition	—	Mark Stuart, Jason Walker	Tait, Israel Houghton	19	22	—	—
"Give Me to You"	2010	Born Again: Miracles Edition	—	Tait, Wes Campbell, Seth Mosley, Juan Otero	Tait	—	—	—	—
"All I Want for Christmas Is You"	2010	Christmas! A Newsboys Holiday	WOW Christmas (2013)	Mariah Carey, Walter Afanasieff	Tait	24	—	—	—
"Jingle Bell Rock"	2010	Christmas! A Newsboys Holiday	WOW Christmas (2011)	Joe Beal, Jim Boothe	Tait	15	9	—	—
"O Holy Night"	2010	Christmas! A Newsboys Holiday	—	Adolphe Adam, Placide Cappeau, traditional	Tait	47	—	—	—
"Winter Wonderland"	2010	Christmas! A Newsboys Holiday	—	Felix Bernard, Richard B. Smith	Tait	32	25	—	—
"Save Your Life"	2011	Born Again: Miracles Edition	Live in Concert: God's Not Dead (live); God's Not Dead: The Greatest Hits of the Newsboys	Seth Mosley, Juan Otero, Ben Clark, Bori Afolabi	Tait	18	20	1	—
"The King Is Coming"	2011	God's Not Dead	Live in Concert: God's Not Dead (live); God's Not Dead: The Motion Picture Soundtrack; God's Not Dead: The Greatest Hits of the Newsboys	Jared Anderson, Seth Mosley	Tait	—	—	—	—
"God's Not Dead (Like a Lion)" (featuring Kevin Max)	2011	God's Not Dead	WOW Hits 2013; Live in Concert: God's Not Dead (live); God's Not Dead: The Motion Picture Soundtrack (movie version); God's Not Dead: The Greatest Hits of the Newsboys	Daniel Bashta	Tait, Kevin Max	2	1	1	—
"Your Love Never Fails"	2011	God's Not Dead	Live in Concert: God's Not Dead (live); God's Not Dead: The Greatest Hits of the Newsboys	Anthony Skinner, Chris McClarney	Tait	6	7	1	—
"Here We Stand"	2011	God's Not Dead	Live in Concert: God's Not Dead (live)	Seth Mosley, Jason Ingram	Tait	—	—	—	—
"Savior of the World"	2011	God's Not Dead	—	Ben Cantelon	Tait	—	—	—	—
"Forever Reign"	2011	God's Not Dead	—	Jason Ingram, Reuben Morgan	Tait	—	—	—	—
"More Than Enough"	2011	God's Not Dead	—	Sarah Hart, Jonathan Lee	Tait	—	—	—	—
"Revelation Song"	2011	God's Not Dead	Live in Concert: God's Not Dead (live); God's Not Dead: The Greatest Hits of the Newsboys	Jennie Lee Riddle	Tait	—	—	—	—
"Pouring It Out for You"	2011	God's Not Dead	—	Jared Anderson, Jonathan Lee	Tait	—	—	—	—
"All the Way"	2011	God's Not Dead	—	Seth Mosley, Jason Ingram	Tait	—	—	—	—
"I Am Second" (featuring Kevin Max)	2011	God's Not Dead	—	Seth Mosley, Ben Glover, Norm Miller	Tait, Kevin Max	—	—	—	—
"The League of Incredible Vegetables (Theme)"	2012	The League of Incredible Vegetables (DVD)	—	Seth Mosley, Mike Nawrocki	Tait	—	—	—	—
"Nothing But the Blood of Jesus"	2012	Live in Concert: God's Not Dead (live)	—	traditional	Tait	—	—	—	—
"God's Not Dead Message" (spoken)	2012	Live in Concert: God's Not Dead (live)	—	Rice Broocks	Tait	—	—	—	—
"Jesus Paid It All"	2013	Hallelujah for the Cross	Jesus, Firm Foundation: Hymns of Worship	Elvina M. Hall (words), John T. Grape (music)	Tait	—	—	—	—
"That's How You Change the World"	2013	Restart	—	Justin Ebach, Nate Sallie, Sam Tinnesz	Tait	—	—	—	—
"Restart"	2013	Restart	—	Joshua Silverberg, Tait, Jonathan White, Kipp Williams	Tait	—	—	—	—
"Love Like I Mean It"	2013	Restart	—	Ben Glover, Christopher Stevens, Tait	Tait	—	—	—	—
"Live with Abandon"	2013	Restart	WOW Hits 2014	Joshua Silverberg, Jonathan White, Kipp Williams	Tait	9	11	5	—
"Go Glow"	2013	Restart	—	Deshon Bullock, Joshua Silverberg, Kipp Williams	Tait	—	—	—	—
"That Home"	2013	Restart	—	Eric Arjes, Juan Otero	Tait	43	—	—	—
"Disaster"	2013	Restart	—	Ian Eskelin, David Garcia, Ben Glover, Tait	Tait	—	—	—	—
"Fishers of Men"	2013	Restart	—	Wes Campbell, Ian Eskelin, David Garcia, Christopher Stevens, Tait	Tait	—	—	—	—
"One Word"	2013	Restart	—	Phillip LaRue, Seth Mosley, Nick De Partee	Tait	—	—	—	—
"Enemy"	2013	Restart	—	Jeremy McCoy, Juan Otero, Tait, Fred Williams	Tait	—	—	—	—
"We Believe"	2013	Restart	My Hope: Songs Inspired by the Message and Mission of Billy Graham; WOW Hits 2015	Richie Fike, Matt Hooper, Travis Ryan	Tait	2	1	2	—
"Overflow"	2013	Restart: Deluxe Edition	—	Joshua Silverberg, Kipp Williams, Jonathan White	Tait	—	—	—	—
"Man on Fire" (featuring Kevin Max)	2013	Restart: Deluxe Edition	—	Christopher McLeod, Joshua Silverberg, Tait, Kipp Williams	Tait, Kevin Max	—	—	—	—
"God Is Movin'"	2013	Restart: Deluxe Edition	—	Christopher Stevens, Tait, Jason Walker	Tait	—	—	—	—
"The Living Years" (featuring Kevin Max)	2013	Restart: Deluxe Edition	—	Brian Robertson, Michael Rutherford	Tait, Kevin Max	—	—	—	—
"Stronger"	2013	Restart: Deluxe Edition	—	Ben Fielding, Reuben Morgan	Tait	—	—	—	—
"All Creatures of Our God and King"	2014	Hallelujah for the Cross	—	Francis of Assisi (words), William H. Draper (English translation), Ralph V. Williams (melody)	Tait	—	—	—	—
"His Eye Is on the Sparrow"	2014	Hallelujah for the Cross	—	Civilla D. Martin (words), Charles H. Gabriel (music)	Tait	—	—	—	—
"Hallelujah for the Cross"	2014	Hallelujah for the Cross	—	Ross King, Todd Wright	Tait	—	—	—	—
"It Is Well"	2014	Hallelujah for the Cross	—	Horatio G. Spafford (words), Philip P. Bliss (music)	Tait	—	—	—	—
"I Surrender All"	2014	Hallelujah for the Cross	—	Judson W. Van DeVenter (words), Winfield S. Weeden (music)	Tait	—	—	—	—
"What a Friend We Have in Jesus"	2014	Hallelujah for the Cross	—	Joseph M. Scriven (words), Charles C. Converse (words),	Tait	—	—	—	—
"Holy, Holy, Holy"	2014	Hallelujah for the Cross	—	Reginald Heber (words), John B. Dykes (words)	Tait	—	—	—	—
"All Hail the Power of Jesus' Name"	2014	Hallelujah for the Cross	—	Edward Perronet (words), John Rippon (alt. words), Oliver Holden (music)	Tait	—	—	—	—
"Guilty"	2015	Love Riot	God's Not Dead 2; WOW Hits 2017; Love Riot	TBA	Tait	—	—	—	—
"Hero"	2016	Love Riot	—	TBA	Tait	—	—	—	—
"Crazy"	2016	Love Riot	—	TBA	Tait	—	—	—	—
"Committed"	2016	Love Riot	—	TBA	Tait	—	—	—	—
"You Hold It All"	2016	Love Riot	—	TBA	Tait	—	—	—	—
"What I Want Them to Say"	2016	Love Riot	—	TBA	Tait	—	—	—	—
"Earthquake"	2016	Love Riot	—	TBA	Tait	—	—	—	—
"Love Riot"	2016	Love Riot	—	TBA	Tait	—	—	—	—
"Family of God"	2016	Love Riot	—	TBA	Tait	—	—	—	—
"No Longer Slaves"	2016	Love Riot	—	TBA	Tait	—	—	—	—

== See also ==
- Newsboys discography
