= The Ultimate Collection (Newsboys album) =

Compilation album by Newsboys
- Released: 7 April 2009
- Recorded: 1992–2008
- Genre: Christian rock, pop rock
- Label: Sparrow

Newsboys chronology
| Newsboys Live: Houston We Are GO (2008) | The Ultimate Collection (2009) | In the Hands of God (2009) |

Professional ratings
Review scores
| Source | Rating |
|---|---|
| Cross Rhythms | 4/10 stars |

The Ultimate Collection is the fourth, major compilation album by Christian pop rock band Newsboys, released on 7 April 2009, and is the first double-disc format greatest hits album for the group.

The album is a part of The Ultimate Collection series, each of which spotlights 24 songs from various Christian recording artists.

The Newsboys' installment of The Ultimate Collection contains most of the songs that appeared on their 2007 compilation album, The Greatest Hits (minus "Real Good Thing" and "Reality," which are both absent on the double-disc set). In addition to the 16 songs that appeared on The Greatest Hits are "Woohoo," "Step Up to the Microphone," "Love Liberty Disco," "Beautiful Sound," "Who?," "In Christ Alone," "Devotion," and "Blessed Be Your Name." The Ultimate Collection is the only Newsboys compilation to date to include their hit song "Love Liberty Disco."

== Track listing ==
Disc 1

| No. | Title | Writer(s) | Album | Length |
|---|---|---|---|---|
| 1. | "Shine" (Tom Lord-Alge remix) | Peter Furler, Steve Taylor | Going Public (1994) | 3:41 |
| 2. | "Breakfast" | Peter Furler, Steve Taylor | Take Me to Your Leader (1996) | 3:36 |
| 3. | "Take Me to Your Leader" | Peter Furler, Steve Taylor | Take Me to Your Leader (1996) | 2:58 |
| 4. | "It Is You" | Peter Furler | Thrive (2002) | 4:21 |
| 5. | "You Are My King (Amazing Love)" | Billy James Foote, arr. Peter Furler, Steve Taylor | Adoration: The Worship Album (2003) | 4:29 |
| 6. | "Entertaining Angels" | Jody Davis, Peter Furler, Phil Joel | Step Up to the Microphone (1998) | 4:18 |
| 7. | "Million Pieces" | Peter Furler, Steve Taylor | Thrive (2002) | 4:13 |
| 8. | "Joy" | Peter Furler, Steve Taylor | Shine: The Hits (2000) | 3:44 |
| 9. | "Who?" | Peter Furler, Steve Taylor | Shine: The Hits (2000) | 3:32 |
| 10. | "In Christ Alone" | Keith Getty, Stuart Townend, arr. Peter Furler, Steve Taylor | Adoration: The Worship Album (2003) | 4:17 |
| 11. | "Spirit Thing" | Peter Furler, Steve Taylor | Going Public (1994) | 3:25 |
| 12. | "Woohoo" | Peter Furler, Phil Joel | Step Up to the Microphone (1998) | 3:23 |

Disc 2

| No. | Title | Writer(s) | Album | Length |
|---|---|---|---|---|
| 1. | "Step Up to the Microphone" | Peter Furler, Phil Joel, Jeff Frankenstein | Step Up to the Microphone (1998) | 3:57 |
| 2. | "In The Belly of the Whale" | Peter Furler, Steve Taylor | Jonah: A VeggieTales Movie (2002) | 2:57 |
| 3. | "Wherever We Go" | Peter Furler, Phil Joel, Steve Taylor, Lynn Nichols, Tedd T. | GO (2006) | 3:27 |
| 4. | "Something Beautiful" | Peter Furler, Paul Colman | GO (2006) | 3:52 |
| 5. | "He Reigns" | Peter Furler, Steve Taylor | Adoration: The Worship Album (2003) | 4:55 |
| 6. | "Beautiful Sound" | Peter Furler, Phil Joel | Love Liberty Disco (1999) | 3:47 |
| 7. | "Love Liberty Disco" | Jody Davis, Jeff Frankenstein, Peter Furler, Duncan Phillips | Love Liberty Disco (1999) | 3:43 |
| 8. | "I Fought The La ..." | Peter Furler, Steve Taylor, Tedd Tjornhom | The Greatest Hits (2007) | 3:06 |
| 9. | "Stay Strong" | Jeff Frankenstein, Peter Furler, Steve Taylor | The Greatest Hits (2007) | 4:07 |
| 10. | "Blessed Be Your Name" (featuring Rebecca St. James) | Matt Redman, Beth Redman, arr. Peter Furler | Devotion (2004) | 4:34 |
| 11. | "Devotion" | Peter Furler, Steve Taylor | Devotion (2004) | 3:58 |
| 12. | "I'm Not Ashamed" | Peter Furler, Steve Taylor | Not Ashamed (1992) | 4:25 |
