= Houston We Are GO =

Live album by Newsboys
- Released: 30 September 2008
- Recorded: 8 March 2008
- Genre: Christian rock, pop rock
- Length: 76:46
- Label: Inpop
- Producer: Tedd T., Peter Furler, John L. Meek

Newsboys chronology
The Greatest Hits (2007)	Houston We Are GO (2008)	The Ultimate Collection (2009)

Professional ratings
Review scores
Source	Rating
Jesus Freak Hideout	3.5/5 stars
Allmusic	4/5 stars
Cross Rhythms	8/10 stars

Houston We Are GO is the third live album by Christian pop rock band Newsboys, released on 30 September 2008. It includes a CD and DVD. It was filmed at the Berry Center in Houston, Texas.

== Track listing ==
No.	Title	Writer(s)	Original studio recording on	Length
1.	"Shine"	Peter Furler	Going Public	7:00
2.	"Wherever We Go"	Furler, Phil Joel, Lynn Nichols, Tedd Tjornhom	Go	3:23
3.	"The Mission"	Furler	Go	3:25
4.	"Something Beautiful"	Paul Colman, Furler	Go	3:53
5.	"Blessed Be Your Name"	Matt Redman	Devotion	7:25
6.	"Stay Strong"	Jeff Frankenstein, Furler	The Greatest Hits	4:11
7.	"B Stage Medley: I'm Not Ashamed \ Reality \ Love Liberty Disco \ You Are My King (Amazing Love)"	Jody Davis, Frankenstein, Furler, Joel, Duncan Phillips	-	9:10
8.	"Entertaining Angels"	Davis, Furler, Joel	Step Up to the Microphone	4:10
9.	"He Reigns"	Furler	Adoration: The Worship Album	4:52
10.	"Breakfast"	Furler	Take Me to Your Leader	7:48
11.	"Your Love Is Better Than Life"	Colman, Furler, Joel	Go	3:32
12.	"Drum Solo"	Phillips	-	0:46
13.	"I Am Free"	Jonathan Egan, Furler	Go	6:05
14.	"Peter's Testimony"	Furler	-	11:06
Total length:				76:46

== Personnel ==
- Peter Furler – lead vocals, guitars, drums
- Paul Colman – lead guitar, vocals
- Jeff Frankenstein – keyboards, key bass, vocals
- Duncan Phillips – drums, percussion
