= The Greatest Hits (Newsboys album) =

Greatest hits album by Newsboys
- Released: 20 November 2007
- Recorded: 1992–2007
- Genre: Pop rock, Christian rock
- Length: 67:54
- Label: Sparrow

Newsboys chronology
GO Remixed (2007)	The Greatest Hits (2007)	Newsboys Live: Houston We Are GO (2008)

Professional ratings
Review scores
Source	Rating
Jesus Freak Hideout	4/5 stars
Cross Rhythms	7/10 stars

The Greatest Hits is a greatest hits album by Christian pop rock band Newsboys. The album features their biggest hit radio singles and two new songs entitled "I Fought the La..." and "Stay Strong". It also includes for the first time on a Newsboys album the song "In the Belly of the Whale", which was recorded for the Jonah: A VeggieTales Movie soundtrack.

== Track listing ==
No.	Title	Writer(s)	Original recording on	Length
1.	"I Fought the La..."	Peter Furler, Steve Taylor, Tedd Tjornhom	New song	3:06
2.	"Breakfast"	Furler, Taylor	Take Me to Your Leader	3:37
3.	"Million Pieces"	Furler, Taylor	Thrive	4:14
4.	"Shine" (Tom Lord-Alge remix)	Furler, Taylor	Going Public	3:41
5.	"Something Beautiful"	Paul Colman, Furler	Go	3:51
6.	"In the Belly of the Whale"	Furler, Taylor	Veggie Rocks!	3:05
7.	"He Reigns"	Furler, Taylor	Adoration: The Worship Album	4:55
8.	"Wherever We Go"	Furler, Tjornhom, Lynn Nichols, Phil Joel, Taylor	Go	3:27
9.	"Take Me to Your Leader"	Furler, Taylor	Take Me to Your Leader	2:51
10.	"Stay Strong"	Furler, Taylor, Jeff Frankenstein	New song	4:09
11.	"Entertaining Angels"	Jody Davis, Furler, Joel	Step Up to the Microphone	4:18
12.	"Reality"	Furler, Taylor	Take Me to Your Leader	3:28
13.	"You Are My King (Amazing Love)"	Billy James Foote	Adoration: The Worship Album	4:29
14.	"Real Good Thing"	Davis, Furler, Taylor	Going Public	2:44
15.	"Joy"	Furler, Taylor	Shine: The Hits	3:43
16.	"Spirit Thing"	Furler, Taylor	Going Public	3:26
17.	"It Is You"	Furler, Taylor	Thrive	4:21
18.	"I'm Not Ashamed"	Furler, Taylor	Not Ashamed	4:25
Total length:				67:54

== Singles ==
Due to the Newsboys' previous studio album Go still being promoted by its own radio singles–"In Wonder" was still climbing the Christian charts at the time of the release of The Greatest Hits–the first single from the new compilation album, "Stay Strong" wasn't released as a radio single until early in 2008, nearly five months after the album's release. The single peaked at No. 19 on Billboard's Hot Christian Songs and No. 20 on the Hot Christian AC chart. "I Fought the La...", the other new recording from The Greatest Hits, was not released as a radio single.
