= He Reigns: The Worship Collection =

Compilation album by Newsboys
- Released: 4 October 2005
- Genre: Worship
- Label: Sparrow/EMI CMG

Newsboys chronology
Devotion (2004)	He Reigns: The Worship Collection (2005)	GO (2006)

Professional ratings
Review scores
Source	Rating
Cross Rhythms	7/10 stars

He Reigns: The Worship Collection is the second major compilation album for the Christian rock group Newsboys. After the group left Sparrow Records, the label decided to release a new compilation album. While their first compilation Shine: The Hits covered their best-known songs, He Reigns: The Worship Collection covered the softer, more "inspirational" songs in the latter part of the group's career (from 1999's Love Liberty Disco album to their most recent set, Devotion) leaving off some of their most well-known "pop" songs (most notably "Love Liberty Disco", "Good Stuff," "Joy", "Who?" and "Million Pieces (Kissin' Your Cares Goodbye)") released during this time period.

== Track listing ==
No.	Title	Writer(s)	Originally recorded on	Length
1.	"It Is You"	Peter Furler	Thrive	4:22
2.	"He Reigns"	Furler, Steve Taylor	Adoration: The Worship Album	4:54
3.	"You Are My King (Amazing Love)"	Billy James Foote	Adoration: The Worship Album	4:34
4.	"Presence (My Heart's Desire)"	Furler, Tim Hughes, Taylor	Devotion	3:57
5.	"Devotion"	Furler, Taylor	Devotion	3:58
6.	"Blessed Be Your Name" (featuring Rebecca St. James)	Beth Redman, Matt Redman	Devotion	4:34
7.	"Beautiful Sound"	Furler, Phil Joel	Love Liberty Disco	3:46
8.	"In Christ Alone"	Keith Getty, Stuart Townend	Adoration: The Worship Album	3:58
9.	"Strong Tower"	Furler, Taylor	Devotion	4:03
10.	"Lord (I Don't Know)"	Furler, Taylor	Thrive	3:47
11.	"God of Nations"	Furler, Taylor	Devotion	3:47
Total length:				45:59

== Personnel ==
- Peter Furler – lead vocals, drums, guitar on all tracks
- Phil Joel – vocals, bass guitar, guitars on all tracks
- Jody Davis – vocals, lead/rhythm guitars, bass on tracks 1–3, 7–8, and 10
- Jeff Frankenstein – keys, vocals on all tracks
- Duncan Phillips – drums, percussion, vocals
- Bryan Olesen – guitars, vocals on tracks 4–6, 9, and 11
- Rebecca St. James – vocals on Blessed Be Your Name
