= Newsboys Live in Concert: God's Not Dead =

Live album by Newsboys
- Released: 23 October 2012
- Recorded: 2012 at Sonshine Festival and Lifest
- Genre: Christian rock, worship, pop rock
- Label: Sparrow
- Producer: Seth Mosley

Newsboys chronology
God's Not Dead (2011)	Newsboys Live in Concert: God's Not Dead (2012)	Restart (2013)

Newsboys Live In Concert: God's Not Dead is the second live album from Australian Christian rock band Newsboys. It was recorded in July 2012 at Sonshine Festival and Lifest and released through Sparrow Records on 22 October 2012 and features songs from their albums Born Again (2010), God's Not Dead (2011), and live recordings of Michael Tait singing "He Reigns" and "Something Beautiful".

== Track listing ==
No.	Title	Writer(s)	Originally recorded on	Length
1.	"Escape"	Steve Taylor, Michael Tait, Wes Campbell, Seth Mosley, Juan Otero	Born Again	2:35
2.	"Born Again"	Tait, Campbell, Mosley, Otero	Born Again	2:51
3.	"Something Beautiful"	Paul Colman, Peter Furler	Go	5:01
4.	"The King is Coming"	Mosley, Jared Anderson	God's Not Dead	4:44
5.	"Your Love Never Fails" (Jesus Culture cover)	Anthony Skinner, Chris McClarney	God's Not Dead	3:38
6.	"Here We Stand"	Mosley, Jason Ingram	God's Not Dead	4:20
7.	"He Reigns"	Taylor, Furler	Adoration: The Worship Album	4:43
8.	"Nothing But the Blood of Jesus"	Robert Lowry	—	3:26
9.	"Mighty to Save"	Reuben Morgan, Ben Fielding	Born Again	3:16
10.	"Save Your Life"	Mosley, Otero, Ben Clark, Bori Afolabi	Born Again: Miracles Edition	3:02
11.	"Miracles"	Tait, Campbell, Mosley, Otero	Born Again	3:08
12.	"Jesus Freak" (featuring George Moss) (DC Talk cover)	Toby McKeehan, Mark Heimermann	Born Again	3:57
13.	"God's Not Dead Message" (spoken by Jeff Frankenstein)	Rice Broocks	—	4:35
14.	"God's Not Dead (Like a Lion)"	Daniel Bashta	God's Not Dead	4:25
15.	"Revelation Song"	Jennie Lee Riddle	God's Not Dead	4:29
Total length:				58:12

== Personnel ==
- Michael Tait – lead vocals
- Jody Davis – lead guitar, background vocals
- Jeff Frankenstein – keyboards, key vocals
- Duncan Phillips – drums, percussion
- George Moss – rap on "Jesus Freak"
