= Shine: The Hits =

Greatest hits album by Newsboys
- Released: 24 October 2000
- Recorded: 1988–2000
- Genres: Christian rock, Christian pop
- Length: 71:21
- Label: Sparrow

Newsboys chronology
Love Liberty Disco (1999)	Shine: The Hits (2000)	Thrive (2002)

Professional ratings
Review scores
Source	Rating
AllMusic	4/5 stars
Cross Rhythms	9/10 stars
Jesus Freak Hideout	4/5 stars

Shine: The Hits is the first compilation album by Christian pop rock group Newsboys. It was released in 2000, featuring recordings from every album up to that point except for Hell Is for Wimps (1990) and Love Liberty Disco (1999). Exclusive to the set were three new songs ("Joy", "Who?", and "Praises"), an update of their 1996 hit "God Is Not a Secret", featuring TobyMac, a remix of their hit "Shine", and an eight-minute "Mega-Mix" of several of their biggest hits. Also included is an extended version of "I'm Not Ashamed", which differs from the original album version.

== Track listing ==
No.	Title	Lyrics	Music	Original studio recording on	Length
1.	"Shine" (Tom Lord-Alge remix)	Steve Taylor	Peter Furler	Going Public (1994)	3:45
2.	"I'm Not Ashamed" (extended house mix)	Steve Taylor, Peter Furler	Peter Furler	Not Ashamed (1992)	4:40
3.	"Breakfast"	Steve Taylor	Peter Furler	Take Me to Your Leader (1996)	3:39
4.	"Reality"	Steve Taylor, Peter Furler	Peter Furler	Take Me to Your Leader (1996)	3:29
5.	"Take Me to Your Leader"	Steve Taylor	Peter Furler	Take Me to Your Leader (1996)	2:59
6.	"Joy"	Steve Taylor, Peter Furler	Peter Furler	new track	4:11
7.	"Entertaining Angels"	Jody Davis, Peter Furler, Phil Joel	Jody Davis, Peter Furler, Phil Joel	Step Up to the Microphone (1998)	4:20
8.	"Praises"	Steve Taylor, Peter Furler, Toby McKeehan	Peter Furler	new track	4:00
9.	"Spirit Thing"	Steve Taylor, Peter Furler	Peter Furler	Going Public (1994)	3:27
10.	"WooHoo"	Peter Furler, Phil Joel	Peter Furler, Phil Joel	Step Up to the Microphone (1998)	3:24
11.	"Step Up to the Microphone"	Peter Furler, Phil Joel, Jeff Frankenstein	Peter Furler, Phil Joel, Jeff Frankenstein	Step Up to the Microphone (1998)	3:57
12.	"God Is Not a Secret" (featuring tobyMac)	Steve Taylor, Peter Furler, Toby McKeehan	Peter Furler	re-recording of track from Take Me to Your Leader (1996)	3:03
13.	"Where You Belong/Turn Your Eyes Upon Jesus"	Steve Taylor, Helen H. Lemmel	Peter Furler, Helen H. Lemmel	Not Ashamed (1992)	5:33
14.	"Who?"	Steve Taylor, Peter Furler	Peter Furler	new track	3:33
15.	"Believe"	Peter Furler, Phil Joel	Peter Furler, Phil Joel	Step Up to the Microphone (1998)	4:35
16.	"I Got Your Number"	Peter Furler, Sean Taylor, John James, George Perdikis	Peter Furler, Sean Taylor, John James, George Perdikis	Read All About It (1988)	4:44
17.	"Mega-Mix" (Includes segments of "Shine", "WooHoo", "Take Me to Your Leader", "Breakfast", "Reality", "Entertaining Angels", "Step Up to the Microphone", and "I'm Not Ashamed")			new track	8:01

== Personnel ==
Newsboys

- Peter Furler – lead vocals, guitars, drums
- Jody Davis – guitars, vocals
- Jeff Frankenstein – keyboards, programming, electric vocals
- Phil Joel – bass, vocals
- Duncan Phillips – drums, percussion

Additional musicians

- Pop Steam Choir – backing vocals on "Joy"
- TobyMac – rap and rap spice on "God Is Not a Secret"
- Robert "Void" Caprio – additional loops and noises on "God Is Not a Secret"
- DJ Maj – DJ Cuts
- Dan Muckala – additional keyboards on "Who?"

Production

- Peter Furler – producer (1–5, 7, 9, 11, 12, 13, 15)
- Steve Taylor – producer (1–5, 9, 12, 13)
- Joe Baldridge – producer (6, 8, 12, 14), mixing (6, 8, 12, 14)
- Jeff Frankenstein – additional producer (6), producer (8)
- Tommy Sims – producer (16)
- Kip Kubin – producer (17)
- Tony Miracle – producer (17)
- Wes Campbell – executive producer
- Lynn Nichols – executive producer
- Tom Lord-Alge – remixing (1)
- Joe Costa – recording (6, 8, 12, 14)
- Shawn McLean – recording (6, 8, 12, 14)
- Dan Rudin – recording (6, 8, 12, 14), engineer (16)
- Richie Biggs – additional engineer (6, 8, 12, 14)
- Jacquire King – additional engineer (6, 8, 12, 14)
- James Bauer – mix assistant (6, 8, 12, 14)
- Joey Turner – mix assistant (6, 8, 12, 14)
- Stephen Marcussen – mastering at Marcussen Mastering, Hollywood, California
- Christiév Carothers – creative director
- Jan Cook – cover art
- Hunz (Twist) – inside package
- Jimmy Abegg – cover photography, inside photography, tray photography
- Matthew Barnes – inside photography
- Allen Clark – inside photography
- Andrew Lichtenstein – inside photography

Studios

- The Bennett House, Franklin, Tennessee – recording location (6, 8, 12, 14)
- OmniSound Studios, Nashville, Tennessee – mixing location
- The Sound Kitchen, Franklin, Tennessee – mixing location
- Chessington Synthlabs – recording location, mixing location (17)

== Shine: The Hits Live One Night in Pennsylvania ==
Shine: The Hits Live One Night in Pennsylvania was released to DVD in 2000. While the title of the DVD is the same as the compilation album of the same name, it is essentially a re-release of the Newsboys' Live: One Night in Pennsylvania concert DVD, which was recorded during their Step Up to the Microphone tour in 1998. Because of this, not all of the songs are included on both the CD and DVD. Songs exclusive to the live DVD are "Cup O' Tea" (from their 1996 Take Me to Your Leader album), "Always," "Truth Be Known - Everybody Gets a Shot," and "Hallelujah" (the latter three taken from their Step Up to the Microphone album, which they were promoting at the time). Songs not included on the DVD include all of the 2000 recordings and re-recordings ("Joy," "Who?," "Praises," "Mega-Mix," "God Is Not a Secret"), as well as "I Got Your Number" and "Where You Belong"/"Turn Your Eyes Upon Jesus." In addition the song “Reality” features a brief cover of Funkytown by Lipps inc. covered by Jeff Frankenstein.

1. "I'm Not Ashamed"
2. "Spirit Thing"
3. "Take Me to Your Leader"
4. "WooHoo"
5. "Cup O' Tea"
6. "Entertaining Angels"
7. "Always"
8. "Believe"
9. "Reality"
10. "Truth Be Known - Everybody Gets a Shot"
11. "Drum Solo"
12. "Breakfast"
13. "Step Up to the Microphone"
14. "Hallelujah"
15. "Shine"

== Radio singles ==
All of the previously released songs had already been issued as singles to radio, and all five of the new tracks were eventually released as singles (this does not include the slightly different mix of "Shine" included in this set):

- "Joy"
- "Mega-Mix"
- "Who?"
- "God Is Not a Secret" (featuring TobyMac)
- "Praises"
