= Paul Colman =

British-Australian musician (born 1967)

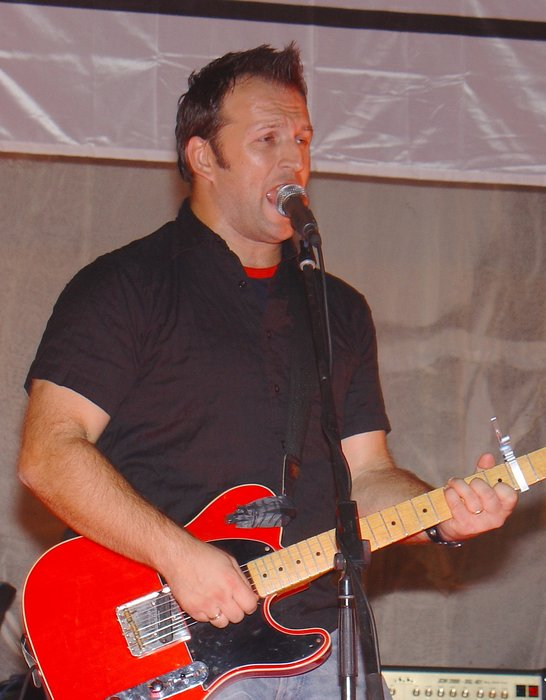
- Colman in 2005

Background information
- Born: Paul Colman; 22 August 1967 (age 58); London, England
- Genres: Christian pop; pop rock; CCM; Christian rock
- Occupations: Singer-songwriter, musician, composer
- Instruments: Guitar, piano, vocals
- Years active: 1994–present
- Label: Independent
- Website: www.paulcolman.com

Paul Colman (born 1967) is a British-Australian pop-rock guitarist, vocalist, pianist, and composer. He has earned recognition as a Christian musician both independently and as part of his band, the Paul Colman Trio, as a solo artist, and with the band Newsboys. His songwriting talents have been recognized with a Grammy nomination and several Dove Awards.

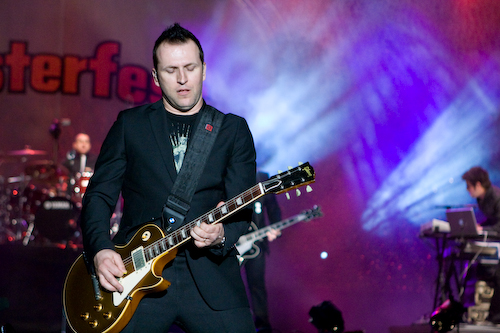
Colman in 2008

Colman was born and raised in London to an Australian father and a British mother. At the age of seven, his father transitioned from a successful career in theatre and music to a life of ministry in Australia. His father became a long-standing Associate Pastor at Melbourne's Crossway Baptist Church and was a well known gospel singer. It was in Melbourne that Colman began his musical journey, forming his first band at the age of eleven. Early on, however, he did not take music seriously and focused on career as a high-school teacher of history, English, and religion.

== Career ==
In 1998, Colman formed the Paul Colman Trio (PC3) in Melbourne, a band credited with being at the forefront of the Contemporary Christian music scene in Australia. Their debut single, "Fill My Cup", ranked number three on TRAA and drew more than 1,000 people to CD launch events in Sydney, Melbourne, and Brisbane. Due to Colman's willingness to travel, his fanbase extends globally, with listeners in places as far-reaching as Uganda, Holland, Perth, and beyond.

In early 2004, Colman announced his decision to return to his solo career. His debut solo album, Let It Go, gained popularity in both America and Australia. A couple of years later, he joined the Newsboys in 2005, replacing the main guitarist Bryan Olesen, who went on to focus on his own band, Casting Pearls. The first Newsboys album featuring Colman, GO, was released 31 October 2006.

On 5 January 2009, Colman announced he was leaving the Newsboys to focus on his solo career. His album 'History', a collection of cover tunes and previous songs, was released on 27 January 2009, alongside two digital EPs featuring new material and cover songs by other Christian artists.

In January 2011, Colman returned to the studio with Grant Norsworthy and Phil Gaudion of PC3 to work on a new album. Return was released in April 2011, coinciding with a reunion tour of Australia.

By Summer 2011, Colman continues working on his solo album while also producing for new artists, including Lainey Wright, Glenridge, and Epic Season.

As of late 2017, Colman has been collaborating with German singer/guitarist Claas P. Jambor in a duo called The Mighty Misfits.

== Discography ==
=== Solo ===
- Life Is Where You Are EP (1997)
- The Band Thing (1997)
- One Voice, One Guitar (1998)
- Official Bootleg (2000)
- One Voice One Guitar Vol 2 (2005)
- Let It Go (2005)
- History (2009)
- If I Was Jesus EP (2009)
- From the Saltland to the River (2012)
- Recalculating EP #1 (2015)
- Recalculating EP #2 (2016)
- Recalculating EP #3 (2016)
- Recalculating (2016)
- Most Requested (2016)

=== With Paul Colman Trio ===
- Live in America (Official Bootleg), 1999
- Serious Fun, 1999
- Turn, 2000
- pc3 – Live Acoustic, 2001
- pc3 – Live Electric, 2001
- pc3 – Live (USA version), 2001
- New Map of the World, 2002
- One, 2003
- Return, 2011

=== With Newsboys ===
- GO, 2006
- GO Remixed, 2007
- The Greatest Hits, 2007
- Houston We Are GO, 2008
