= God's Not Dead (Like a Lion) =

2011 song performed by Newsboys

"Like a Lion"

Song by Passion

from the album Passion: Awakening
- Released: March 11, 2010
- Recorded: January 2010
- Genre: Worship, CCM
- Label: sixsteps
- Songwriter: Daniel Bashta
- Producer: Nathan Nockels

"Like a Lion" is song written by Daniel Bashta and originally performed by Passion (with David Crowder) on the 2010 album Passion: Awakening. In 2011, it was covered by Newsboys as "God's Not Dead (Like a Lion)" and released as a single from the album God's Not Dead. The song appeared on charts during its release in 2012. The song charted in 2014, after the release of the film, God's Not Dead. The band performs the song, in a concert sequence, dedicating the song to the film's protagonist Josh Wheaton, at the end of the film. The song was released through Inpop Records. It is also heard in the credits of God's Not Dead 2 and God's Not Dead: A Light in Darkness.

== Background ==
The song was written by Daniel Bashta. The lead vocals are performed by David Crowder.

"God's Not Dead (Like a Lion)"

Single by Newsboys and Kevin Max

from the album God's Not Dead
- Released: 12 October 2011
- Recorded: 2011
- Genre: Contemporary Christian music, contemporary worship music, pop rock
- Length: 4:18
- Label: Inpop
- Songwriter: Daniel Bashta
- Producer: Seth Mosley

Newsboys and Kevin Max singles chronology
"You Are My King (Amazing Love)" (2003)	"God's Not Dead (Like a Lion)" (2011)

=== Newsboys version ===
In the Newsboys version, the lead vocals are performed by Michael Tait and features fellow DC Talk member Kevin Max.

It was first released as a single on 12 October 2011, peaking at No. 2 on 9 June 2012 after spending 22 weeks on the Billboard Hot Christian Songs. and then again when the film of the same name was released in 2014. It helped to propel "We Believe", from Restart, to the No. 2 position on the chart as well.

In the United States, the single reached gold sales in June 2014, and by May 2015 it became the band's first platinum single, selling more than 1 million.

== Music video ==
The music video for the song was published on 6 January 2012. The video is set in New York City, and also shows many views of the Hudson River. During the video, the Newsboys themselves, along with others, read a headline stating: "God Is a Myth". In the video, the Newsboys are seen performing in both a concert, and a smaller studio setting.

== Charts ==
Chart (2012)	Peak position
Billboard Hot Christian Songs	2
Billboard Christian Digital Songs	1
Billboard Heatseekers Songs	23
Billboard Christian Streaming Songs	4

=== Decade-end charts ===
Chart (2010s)	Position
US Christian Songs (Billboard)	26

== Certifications ==
Region	Certification	Certified units/sales
United States (RIAA)	2× Platinum	2,000,000^{‡}
^{‡} Sales+streaming figures based on certification alone.
