= You Are My King (Amazing Love) =

Single by Newsboys

from the album Adoration: The Worship Album
- Released: 2003
- Genre: Worship
- Length: 4:31
- Label: Sparrow
- Songwriter: Billy James Foote
- Producers: Steve Taylor, Peter Furler

"You Are My King (Amazing Love)" is a worship song written by Billy James Foote. It was originally released by contemporary Christian band Phillips, Craig & Dean on their 2001 album Let My Words Be Few, and then by contemporary Christian group Newsboys from their 2003 album Adoration: The Worship Album, also appearing in later compilations He Reigns: The Worship Collection, The Greatest Hits, and The Ultimate Collection and on the various hits compilation WOW Hits 2005. The chorus uses lyrics and melody from Charles Wesley's hymn, "And Can It Be".

On April 16, 2025, Chris Tomlin released a cover of the song as a part of Spotify's first Easter Singles Campaign. The song later appeared on his album The King Is Still the King.

== Charts ==
=== Weekly ===
Weekly chart performance for "You Are My King (Amazing Love)"
Chart (2003)	Peak position
US Christian AC Airplay (Billboard)	1
US Christian Airplay (Billboard)	1
US Christian CHR (R&R)	2
US Hot Christian Songs (Billboard)	1

=== Decade-end ===
Decade-end chart performance for "You Are My King (Amazing Love)"
Chart (2000s)	Peak position
US Christian AC Airplay (Billboard)	4
US Hot Christian Songs (Billboard)	9
