= Thrive (Newsboys album) =

Studio album by Newsboys
- Released: 26 March 2002
- Recorded: 2001
- Genre: Christian rock; Christian pop; praise and worship; power pop
- Length: 37:38
- Label: Sparrow
- Producer: Steve Taylor, Peter Furler, Joe Baldridge

Newsboys chronology
Shine: The Hits (2000)	Thrive (2002)	Newsboys Remixed (2002)

Professional ratings
Review scores
Source	Rating
AllMusic	3/5 stars
Cross Rhythms	10/10 stars
Jesus Freak Hideout	4/5 stars

Thrive is the ninth studio album by Christian pop rock band Newsboys, released in 2002. It features the singles "It Is You", "Million Pieces (Kissin' Your Cares Goodbye)", and "Lord (I Don't Know)". Thrive debuted at No. 38 on the Billboard 200 chart, selling 37,000 units. In 2005, Thrive – Special Edition was bundled with the previously released From the Rock and Roll Hall of Fame and Museum concert DVD. When it was pre-ordered it came with the exclusive It Is You EP.

== Track listing ==
Album release
No.	Title	Writer(s)	Length
1.	"Giving It Over"	Peter Furler, Steve Taylor	3:47
2.	"Live in Stereo"	Furler, Taylor	3:06
3.	"Million Pieces (Kissin' Your Cares Goodbye)"	Furler, Taylor	4:14
4.	"Thrive"	Furler, Taylor	3:53
5.	"Rescue"	Furler, Phil Joel, Taylor	4:22
6.	"It Is You"	Furler	4:22
7.	"Cornelius"	Furler, Taylor	3:31
8.	"The Fad of the Land"	Furler, Taylor	3:18
9.	"John Woo"	Furler, Taylor	3:09
10.	"Lord (I Don't Know)"	Furler, Taylor	3:46
Total length:			37:28

=== Music Videos ===
- "Million Pieces (Kissin' Your Care Goodbye)"

== Radio singles ==
- "It Is You"
- "Million Pieces (Kissin' Your Cares Goodbye)"
- "The Fad of the Land"
- "John Woo"

== Thrive: From The Rock 'N' Roll Hall of Fame ==
Thrive: From The Rock 'N' Roll Hall of Fame was released to DVD 18 June 2002. It was available in Thrive Limited Edition in 2005.

- "Giving it Over"
- "Live in Stereo"
- "Who" – from Shine: The Hits
- "Rescue"
- "Million Pieces (Kissin' Your Cares Goodbye)"
- "It is You"
- "Entertaining Angels" – from Step Up to the Microphone
- "Joy" – from Shine: The Hits
- "The Fad of the Land"
- "Take Me to Your Leader" – from Take Me to Your Leader
- "Thrive"
- "Shine" – from Going Public
- "Breakfast" – from Take Me to Your Leader
- "Lord (I Don't Know)"

== Airplay ==
According to Mediabase, the songs that have received the most spins on airplay (as of August 2007) are as follows, from greatest to least: "It Is You" (38,963 spins), "Million Pieces (Kissin' Your Cares Goodbye)" (28,815 spins), "Lord (I Don't Know)" (141 spins), "John Woo" (78 spins), "Cornelius" (43 spins), "Live in Stereo" (7 spins), "Rescue" (6 spins), "The Fad of the Land" (5 spins), "Giving It Over" (5 spins), and "Thrive" (2 spins).

The "Million Pieces" music video was featured as an Easter egg that followed the "Belly of the Whale" video on disc 2 of Jonah: A VeggieTales Movie on DVD, and "Live in Stereo" was featured in the console version of Disney's Extreme Skate Adventure.

== Personnel ==
Newsboys

- Peter Furler – lead vocals, guitars, drums
- Phil Joel – bass guitar, guitars, backing vocals
- Jody Davis – guitars, backing vocals
- Jeff Frankenstein – keyboards, programming
- Duncan Phillips – drums, percussion

Additional musicians

- Jeff Coffin – baritone saxophone (1)
- Eric Darken – drum corps (2, 7), percussion (2, 7)
- Dan Rudin – vocoder (5), congas (5), additional percussion (7)
- Robert Marvin – additional programming (9)
- Chanel Campbell – chanting on "Cornelius"
- Gabrielle Campbell – bridge chorus on "Live in Stereo"
- Simone Campbell – chanting on "Cornelius"
- Bethany Davis – chanting on "Cornelius"
- Amy Frankenstein – chanting on "Cornelius"
- Debbie Furler – chanting on "Cornelius"
- Summer Furler – chanting on "Cornelius"
- Michelle Keil – bridge chorus on "Live in Stereo"
- Alice Nolte – bridge chorus on "Live in Stereo"
- Breeon Phillips – chanting on "Cornelius"
- Heather Urry – chanting on "Cornelius"
- Tina – chanting on "Cornelius"
- The Campbell Clan – chanting on "Cornelius"
- The Keil Camp – chanting on "Cornelius"
- The Nolte Nippers – chanting on "Cornelius"

Production

- Peter Furler – producer
- Steve Taylor – producer (1–5, 7–10)
- Joe Baldridge – additional production, engineer, mixing (2, 6, 9, 10), producer (6)
- Wes Campbell – executive producer
- Lynn Nichols – executive producer
- Russ Long – engineer
- Dan Rudin – engineer
- Richie Biggs – additional engineer
- Joe Costa – additional engineer, assistant engineer, mix assistant (2, 6, 9, 10)
- Dan Leffler – additional engineer, assistant engineer, mix assistant (2, 6, 9, 10)
- Terence Dover – assistant engineer
- Leslie Richter – assistant engineer
- Todd Wells – assistant engineer
- Tom Lord-Alge – mixing (1, 3, 4, 5, 7, 8)
- Femio Hernandez – mix assistant (1, 3, 4, 5, 7, 8)
- Kevin Pickle – mix assistant (2, 6, 9, 10)
- Bob Ludwig – mastering at Gateway Mastering, Portland, Maine
- Christiév Carothers – creative director
- Jan Cook – art direction
- Buddy Jackson – art direction
- Linda Bourdeaux – design
- Jennifer Kemp – stylist, wardrobe
- David Dobson – photography

Studios

- Bridge Street Studios, Franklin, Tennessee – recording studio
- Dark Horse Recording Studio, Franklin, Tennessee – recording studio
- The Sound Kitchen, Franklin, Tennessee – recording studio, mixing location
- Ocean Way Recording, Hollywood, California – recording studio
- South Beach Studios, Miami Beach, Florida – mixing location
- Recording Arts, Nashville, Tennessee – mixing location
