= Step Up to the Microphone =

Studio album by Newsboys
- Released: 30 June 1998
- Recorded: 1997
- Studios: The Board Room, Franklin, Tennessee
- Genres: CCM, pop rock, bubblegum pop
- Length: 42:06
- Label: Star Song
- Producer: Peter Furler

Newsboys chronology
Take Me to Your Leader (1996)	Step Up to the Microphone (1998)	Love Liberty Disco (1999)

Professional ratings
Review scores
Source	Rating
AllMusic	2.5/5 stars
Cross Rhythms	8/10 stars
HM Magazine	No rating
Jesus Freak Hideout	3.5/5 stars
Kerrang!	4/5 stars
The Phantom Tollbooth	No rating

Step Up to the Microphone is the seventh studio album by Christian pop rock band Newsboys, released in 1998 through Star Song Communications. It was the Newsboys' first album following the departure of lead singer John James in 1997, with Peter Furler and Phil Joel subsequently sharing lead vocal duties.

== Track listing ==
Album release
No.	Title	Writer(s)	Lead vocals	Length
1.	"WooHoo"	Peter Furler, Phil Joel	Phil Joel	3:15
2.	"Step Up to the Microphone"	Jeff Frankenstein, Furler, Joel	Peter Furler	3:43
3.	"Entertaining Angels"	Jody Davis, Furler, Joel	Phil Joel & Peter Furler	4:18
4.	"Believe"	Furler, Joel	Peter Furler	4:33
5.	"Tuning In"	Furler, Joel, Steve Taylor	Peter Furler	4:17
6.	"Truth Be Known - Everybody Gets a Shot"	Furler, Joel, Taylor	Peter Furler & Phil Joel	4:00
7.	"Deep End"	Davis, Frankenstein, Furler, Joel	Peter Furler	4:06
8.	"Hallelujah"	Frankenstein, Furler, Joel	Peter Furler	3:56
9.	"The Tide"	Furler, Joel	Peter Furler, Phil Joel	5:01
10.	"Always"	Furler, Joel	Peter Furler	5:01
Total length:				42:08

=== Music videos ===
- "Entertaining Angels"

== Radio singles ==
Note: all CCM Magazine' chart information is available in the book Hot Hits CHR 1978-1997 (1997) by Jeffrey Lee Brothers

Single	CCM Chart	Debut	Peak Date	Peak Pos	Total Wks	Mediabase Spins (since 1998)	Other Newsboys album appearances	Various artists album appearances
"Entertaining Angels"	CHR	4/20/98	6/8/98	1	14	9,887	Entertaining Angels (1998); Live: One Night in Pennsylvania (1999) (concert video); Shine: The Hits (2000); Thrive: From the Rock and Roll Hall of Fame and Museum (2002) (concert video); Newsboys Remixed (2002) (O2R Mix); 8 Great Hits (2003); The Greatest Hits (2007); Houston We Are GO (2008) (Live); The Ultimate Collection (2009); Discover: 6 Essential Songs (2010); My Newsboys Playlist (2011); Back 2 Back Hits: Adoration/The Greatest Hits (2011); Icon (2013)	The Simply Xcellent New Music Sampler; Life on the Edge; WOW 1999 (1998); The Joyriders (Soundtrack) (2000); Stadium Jam (live); Extreme Days (Soundtrack) (2001)
"Entertaining Angels"	AC	5/25/98	6/29/98	32	8	9,887	Entertaining Angels (1998); Live: One Night in Pennsylvania (1999) (concert video); Shine: The Hits (2000); Thrive: From the Rock and Roll Hall of Fame and Museum (2002) (concert video); Newsboys Remixed (2002) (O2R Mix); 8 Great Hits (2003); The Greatest Hits (2007); Houston We Are GO (2008) (Live); The Ultimate Collection (2009); Discover: 6 Essential Songs (2010); My Newsboys Playlist (2011); Back 2 Back Hits: Adoration/The Greatest Hits (2011); Icon (2013)	The Simply Xcellent New Music Sampler; Life on the Edge; WOW 1999 (1998); The Joyriders (Soundtrack) (2000); Stadium Jam (live); Extreme Days (Soundtrack) (2001)
"Believe"	AC	7/6/98	9/21/98	4	17	3,114	Live: One Night in Pennsylvania (1999) (concert video); Shine: The Hits (2000)	—
"Believe"	CHR	12/14/98	3/1/99	1	13	3,114	Live: One Night in Pennsylvania (1999) (concert video); Shine: The Hits (2000)	—
"Hallelujah"	Rock	7/13/98	9/28/98	4	18	144	Live: One Night in Pennsylvania (1999) (concert video)	Listen Louder (1999) (Illumination Remix)
"WooHoo"	CHR	7/27/98	9/21/98	1	16	615	Live: One Night in Pennsylvania (1999) (concert video); Shine: The Hits (2000); The Ultimate Collection (2009)	—
"WooHoo"	Rock	1/11/99	3/15/99	20	8	615	Live: One Night in Pennsylvania (1999) (concert video); Shine: The Hits (2000); The Ultimate Collection (2009)	—
"Step Up to the Microphone"	CHR	5/3/99	6/14/99	1	16	503	Live: One Night in Pennsylvania (1999) (concert video); Shine: The Hits (2000); 8 Great Hits (2003); The Ultimate Collection (2009); 10 Great Songs (2012)	—

== Personnel ==
Newsboys

- Peter Furler – lead vocals, drums, guitars, programming
- Phil Joel – vocals, bass guitar, guitars
- Jody Davis – lead and rhythm guitars, bass, vocals
- Jeff Frankenstein – keys, vocals, programming
- Duncan Phillips – percussion, drums, vocals

Additional musicians

- Mylon LeFevre – additional vocals "Na-Nas" on "WooHoo"
- "Bull" – additional vocals "Na-Nas" on "WooHoo"
- Summer Furler – additional vocals "Na-Nas" on "WooHoo"
- The Love Sponge Strings – strings on "Entertaining Angels"
- Blair Masters – strings on "Believe"
- Jonathan Roberts – trumpet on "Tuning In"

Production

- Peter Furler – producer, mixing
- Wes Campbell – executive producer, mixing
- Danny Goodwin – executive producer
- John Mays – executive producer
- Richie Biggs – recording, mixing
- Jeff Frankenstein – additional mixing
- Glenn Meadows – mastering at Georgetown Masters, Nashville, Tennessee
- Christiév Carothers – creative direction
- Len Peltier – art direction
- Thom Bissett – graphic design for a3dtb/D
- John Dunne – photography
