= The Heavenly Vision =

1922 hymn written by Helen Howarth Lemmel

The Heavenly Vision (Turn Your Eyes upon Jesus)
- Genre: Hymn
- Written: 1922
- Text: Helen Howarth Lemmel
- Based on: Isaiah 45:22
- Meter: 9.8.9.8.7.8.10.9
- Melody: "Lemmel"

Turn your eyes upon Jesus,
Look full in His wonderful face;
And the things of earth will grow strangely dim
In the light of His glory and grace.

— Helen Howarth Lemmel

"The Heavenly Vision", also known as "Turn Your Eyes upon Jesus" (the first line of its chorus), is a hymn written by Helen Howarth Lemmel. Lemmel was physically blind when she wrote this hymn. It was inspired by a tract entitled Focused, written by the missionary Isabella Lilias Trotter. The chorus is widely known, and has become a standard reprinted in many hymnals.

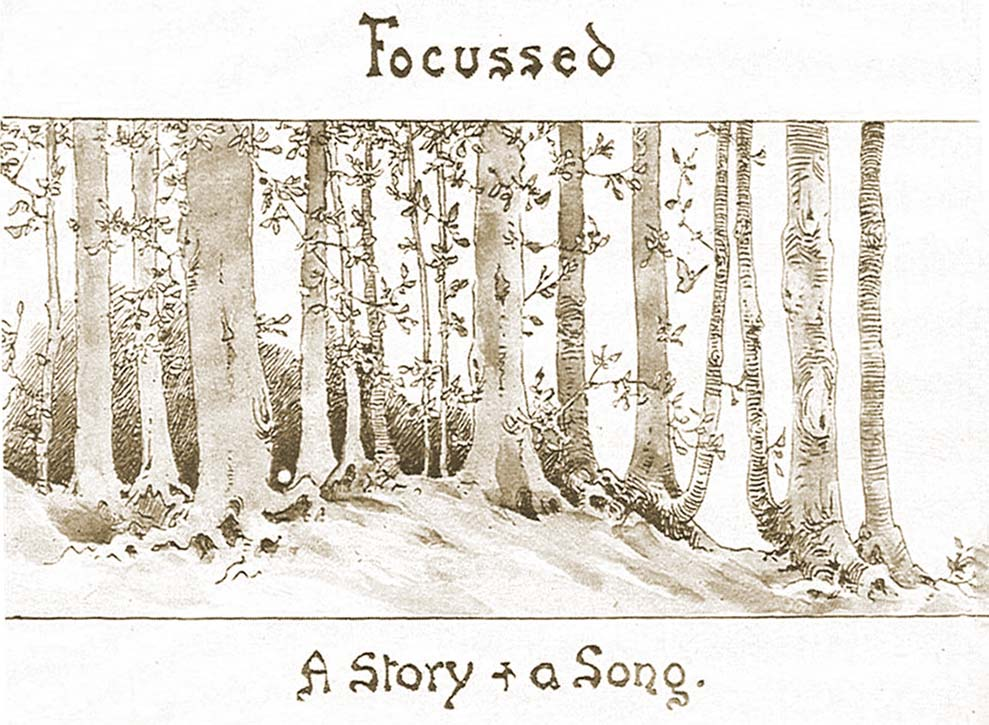
Cover of the tract that inspired the song

Lemmel first published the hymn in England as a pamphlet in 1918, and then included it in a 1922 collection called Glad Songs. It was included in a 1924 American collection entitled Gospel Truth in Song and was widely reprinted in other collections.

== Versions ==
In 1989, Christian singer-songwriter Russ Taff sang it as part of a medley with "Near the Cross" and "My Jesus I Love Thee" on the various artists album Our Hymns.

In 1992 the Christian band Newsboys included the song (combined with "Where You Belong") on their album Not Ashamed and released a video of the song.

In 1999, Hillsong recorded the song and a video live in their album The Secret Place.

Michael W. Smith features the song on his 2001 live worship album Worship.

Country artist Alan Jackson's recording of this song for his father-in-law's funeral in 2005 became the inspiration for his 2006 gospel album Precious Memories.

In 2018, the Christian singer Lauren Daigle recorded "Turn Your Eyes upon Jesus", on her Look Up Child album.

In 2019, the Christian group Passion released "Fade Away" on their album "Follow You Anywhere (Live)", which uses the chorus from this song as an outro.

Also in 2019, Sovereign Grace Music released the modern hymn "Turn Your Eyes" based on Helen Lemmel's chorus on their album The Glorious Christ (Live).

== External link ==
Score of the hymn in Gospel Truth in Song No. 3
