= God's Not Dead (album) =

Studio album by Newsboys
- Released: 15 November 2011
- Recorded: 2011
- Genre: Christian rock, pop rock, contemporary worship music
- Length: 49:25
- Label: Inpop
- Producer: Seth Mosley

Newsboys chronology
Born Again (2010)	God's Not Dead (2011)	Newsboys Live in Concert: God's Not Dead (2012)

Singles from God's Not Dead
- 1. "God's Not Dead (Like a Lion)" Released: 12 October 2011; 2. "Your Love Never Fails" Released: 1 November 2012

Professional ratings
Review scores
Source	Rating
AllMusic	2/5 stars
Jesus Freak Hideout	3.5/5 stars

God's Not Dead is the fifteenth studio album by the Christian rock band Newsboys. It was released on 15 November 2011 and is the second full-length album with lead singer Michael Tait. The album featured songs by Jared Anderson, Daniel Bashta, Jason Ingram, Reuben Morgan, Jennie Lee Riddle, Jonathan Lee, Sarah Hart, Ben Cantelon, Ben Glover, Norm Miller, as well as multiple compositions and arrangements by Seth Mosley of Me in Motion. The album produced one music video for the title track. Kevin Max of dc Talk does background vocals on "God's Not Dead".

The album hit No. 1 on the Billboard Christian Albums chart, and its lead single, "God's Not Dead (Like a Lion)", originally written by Daniel Bashta, was certified Gold by the RIAA. As of 10 July 2014, the album has sold 428,000 copies.

== Track listing ==
No.	Title	Writer(s)	Length
1.	"The King Is Coming"	Jared Anderson, Seth Mosley	4:46
2.	"God's Not Dead (Like a Lion)" (featuring Kevin Max)	Daniel Bashta	4:18
3.	"Your Love Never Fails"	Anthony Skinner, Chris McClarney	3:38
4.	"Here We Stand"	Mosley, Jason Ingram	4:16
5.	"Savior of the World"	Ben Cantelon	3:38
6.	"Forever Reign"	Ingram, Reuben Morgan	3:52
7.	"More Than Enough"	Sarah Hart, Jonathan Lee	3:43
8.	"Revelation Song"	Jennie Lee Riddle	4:49
9.	"Pouring It Out for You"	Anderson, Lee	4:32
10.	"Mighty to Save"	Benjamin Fielding, Morgan	4:27
11.	"All the Way"	Mosley, Ingram	4:07
12.	"I Am Second" (featuring Kevin Max)	Mosley, Ben Glover, Norm Miller	3:19
Total length:			49:25

== Personnel ==
Newsboys

- Michael Tait – lead and backing vocals
- Jody Davis – guitars, backing vocals
- Jeff Frankenstein – keyboards, keyboard bass, programming
- Duncan Phillips – drums, percussion

Additional musicians

- Seth Mosley – keyboards, programming, strings, guitars, bass guitar, percussion, backing vocals
- Todd Caldwell – keyboards, organ
- Brian Dexter – drums
- Steven Kadar – drums
- Jay Dawson – bagpipes
- David Henry – additional strings (12)
- Kevin Max – guest vocals (2, 12)

Production

- Seth Mosley – producer, engineer, editing
- Wes Campbell – executive producer, art direction
- Dave Wagner – executive producer
- Andrew Patton – A&R
- Buckley Miller – engineer, editing, drum recording
- Michael "X" O'Connor – drum recording
- F. Reid Shippen – mixing
- Erik "Keller" Jahner – mix assistant
- Dave McNair – mastering
- Kevin Miller – package design, layout
- David Bean – photography
- Lisa Wong-Ken – hair stylist, wardrobe, make-up

== Charts ==
=== Weekly charts ===
Chart (2011–14)	Peak position
New Zealand Albums (RMNZ)	22
US Billboard 200	45
US Top Catalog Albums (Billboard)	1
US Top Christian Albums (Billboard)	1

=== Year-end charts ===
Chart (2012)	Position
US Billboard 200	172
US Christian Albums (Billboard)	4
Chart (2013)	Position
US Christian Albums (Billboard)	29
Chart (2014)	Position
US Billboard 200	198
US Top Catalog Albums (Billboard)	19
