= In the Hands of God =

Studio album by Newsboys
- Released: 5 May 2009
- Recorded: 2009
- Genres: Christian rock, pop rock
- Length: 37:50
- Label: Inpop
- Producers: Peter Furler, Max Hsu, Jeff Frankenstein

Newsboys chronology
The Ultimate Collection (2009)	In the Hands of God (2009)	Born Again (2010)

Professional ratings
Review scores
Source	Rating
AllMusic	4/5 stars
Jesus Freak Hideout	3.5/5 stars
Cross Rhythms	10/10 stars

In the Hands of God is the thirteenth studio album by Christian band Newsboys. Released on 5 May 2009, it was the last album to feature singer and founding member Peter Furler until 2019's United. It is also the first album since 2003's Adoration: The Worship Album to feature guitarist Jody Davis, the first album on which keyboard player Jeff Frankenstein took on some production duties, and the first album with future lead singer Michael Tait, who guest appears on the album's titular song.

== Release ==
- In the Hands of God debuted at No. 1 on the CCM charts, and No. 28 on the Billboard 200 chart, peaking higher on the pop charts than any of their previous albums.

== Track listing ==
All tracks are written by Steve Taylor, Jeff Frankenstein and Peter Furler except where noted.

No.	Title	Writer(s)	Length
1.	"The Way We Roll"	Taylor, Frankenstein, Furler, Stuart Garrard	3:27
2.	"No Grave"		3:44
3.	"This Is Your Life"		3:25
4.	"Glorious"		4:11
5.	"In the Hands of God" (featuring Michael Tait, Christian Rowe, Phil Joel)		4:18
6.	"The Upside"		3:18
7.	"My Friend Jesus"		2:50
8.	"Lead Me to the Cross"	Brooke Fraser	4:08
9.	"Dance"		3:35
10.	"RSL 1984"	Furler, Taylor	4:34
Total length:			37:32

== Personnel ==
Newsboys

- Peter Furler – lead and backing vocals
- Jody Davis – guitars, backing vocals
- Jeff Frankenstein – keyboards, keyboard bass, backing vocals
- Duncan Phillips – drums, percussion

Additional musicians

- Max Hsu – keyboards
- Dave Perkins – guitar riffs (1)
- Stu G – guitar riffs (3, 4)
- Dave Ghazarian – guitar riffs (3, 4)
- Brian Gocher – guitar riffs (3, 4), string arrangements
- Phil Joel – backing vocals (5)
- Michael Tait – backing vocals (5)
- Christian Rowe – backing vocals (5)

Production

- Peter Furler – producer
- Jeff Frankenstein – producer, engineer
- Max Hsu – producer, engineer, cover photography
- Dale Bray – executive producer
- Wes Campbell – executive producer
- Brian Gocher – engineer
- Joe Baldridge – additional engineer
- F. Reid Shippen – mixing at Robot Lemon, Nashville, Tennessee
- Lee Bridges – editing
- Ainslie Grosser – editing
- Buckley Miller – mix assistant, editing assistant
- Dan Shike – mastering at Tone and Volume Mastering, Nashville, Tennessee
- Breezy Baldwin – design, packaging
- David Dobson – additional photography
