= Boys Will Be Boyz =

Studio album by Newsboys
- Released: 1991
- Recorded: 1991
- Studio: Springbrook Recording Studios (Australia); Starke Lake Studios (Ocoee, Florida, USA); Trax East (South River, New Jersey, USA).
- Genre: Christian rock, Christian pop
- Length: 40:33
- Label: Star Song
- Producer: Peter Furler Tony Miceli

Newsboys chronology
Hell Is for Wimps (1990)	Boys Will Be Boyz (1991)	Not Ashamed (1992)

Professional ratings
Review scores
Source	Rating
Jesus Freak Hideout	3.5/5 stars

Boys Will Be Boyz is the third studio album by Christian pop rock band Newsboys, released in 1991.

== Track listing ==
All tracks are written by Newsboys, except music on "Stay With Me" by Newsboys and Billy Smiley.

Album release
No.	Title	Length
1.	"Kingdom Man"	3:06
2.	"You and Me"	3:15
3.	"One Heart"	4:41
4.	"Turn"	3:28
5.	"Precious Love"	5:45
6.	"Taste and See"	3:02
7.	"Not Stand Silent"	2:30
8.	"Sing Aloud"	3:07
9.	"Stay With Me"	5:19
10.	"Israel"	2:52
11.	"Taste and See" (Remix)	3:28
Total length:		40:33

=== Music Videos ===
- "Kingdom Man"
- "One Heart"
- "Taste and See" (Remix)

== Radio singles ==
- "One Heart"
- "Kingdom Man"
- "Stay With Me"
- "Israel"
- "You and Me"

== Boys Will Be Boyz (video) ==
Boys Will Be Boyz is a live video by Newsboys, released in 1991. It is Newsboys' first live video, and features songs from their then-new third album Boys Will Be Boyz. It also included a bonus video of Simple Man from Hell Is for Wimps. It was available in NTSC, HiFi Sound, and VHS. It is now out of print. Besides the concert video, there is also a behind-the-scenes part.

=== Music videos ===
1. "Taste and See (Remix)"
2. "One Heart"
3. "Kingdom Man"
4. "Simple Man"

== Personnel ==
Newsboys

- John James – lead vocals
- Peter Furler – drums, vocals, arrangements (1–4, 7, 8, 10)
- Corey Pryor – keyboards
- Sean Taylor – bass guitar, vocals
- Vernon Bishop – guitars, vocals

Additional Musicians

- Tony Miceli – Synclavier programming (5, 6, 9, 11), arrangements (5, 6, 9, 11), backing vocals
- Kaz – backing vocals

Heirborn Choir (Track 5)

- Carol Becker
- Terry L. Clark
- Preston Greene
- Ladye Love Smith
- Rod Lyon
- Sarah Moore
- Kathy Smith
- Danny Whipple
- Nancy Whipple

Production

- Peter Furler – producer
- Tony Miceli – producer (5, 6, 9, 11), engineer (5, 6, 9, 11)
- Dez Dickerson – executive producer, mixing (1, 2, 4, 7, 10)
- Rob Merlini – engineer (1–4, 7, 8, 10), mixing (3, 8)
- Salvatore "Plinky" Giglio – mixing (1, 2, 4, 7, 10)
- Anthony DeRosa – assistant engineer
- Wes Campbell – production engineer
- Denny Purcell – mastering
- Georgetown Masters (Nashville, Tennessee, USA) – mastering location
- Toni Thigpen – creative director
- Thanh Tam Nguyen – design
- Steve Lyons – photography
