= Newsboys Remixed =

Remix album by Newsboys
- Released: 24 September 2002
- Genre: Pop rock, Christian pop
- Label: Sparrow

Newsboys chronology
Thrive (2002)	Newsboys Remixed (2002)	Adoration: The Worship Album (2003)

Professional ratings
Review scores
Source	Rating
Jesus Freak Hideout	3.5/5 stars
Cross Rhythms	7/10 stars

Newsboys Remixed is the first full remix album by Christian pop/rock group Newsboys, which includes remixes of some of their most popular songs, as well as some reworked versions of songs from their most recent studio album, Thrive.

== Track listing ==
Album release
No.	Title	Writer(s)	Length
1.	"It Is You" (UK Mix)	Peter Furler	6:58
2.	"Joy" (Let's Be Frank Mix)	Furler, Steve Taylor	6:36
3.	"Lord" (Father B. Mix)	Furler, Taylor	4:12
4.	"Million Pieces" (A Million and One Mix)	Furler, Taylor	3:52
5.	"Beautiful Sound" (Below the Radar Mix)	Furler, Phil Joel	4:57
6.	"Thrive" (Is That James Dancing? Mix)	Furler, Taylor	4:33
7.	"Good Stuff" (NYC Mix)	Furler, Joel	4:57
8.	"Fad of the Land" (Lounge Mix)	Furler, Taylor	4:25
9.	"Entertaining Angels" (O2R Mix)	Jody Davis, Furler, Joel	3:56
10.	"Shine" (YZ250F Mix)	Furler, Taylor	3:41
11.	"Love Liberty Disco" (All Mixed Up Mix)	Davis, Jeff Frankenstein, Furler, Joel, Duncan Phillips	5:37
12.	"Rescue" (Helmet Mix)	Furler, Joel, Taylor	6:07
13.	"Mega Mix"	Davis, Frankenstein, Furler, Joel, Taylor	8:02
Total length:			67:56

=== Note ===
"Thrive" (Is That James Dancing? Mix)

  - Billboard Hot Dance Singles Sales Peak: No. 18 (12 weeks on chart)
