= GO Remixed =

Remix album by Newsboys
- Released: 8 May 2007
- Recorded: 2007
- Genre: Christian rock, pop rock
- Length: 40:20
- Label: Inpop

Newsboys chronology
GO (2006)	GO Remixed (2007)	The Greatest Hits (2007)

Professional ratings
Review scores
Source	Rating
Jesus Freak Hideout	3.5/5 stars
AllMusic	4/5 stars
Cross Rhythms	10/10 stars

GO Remixed is an album by Christian pop and rock band Newsboys. It was released on 8 May 2007. The song "City to City" is featured in the 2011 film Cars 2.

== Track listing ==
No.	Title	Length
1.	"Wherever We Go"	3:27
2.	"Go"	2:42
3.	"Something Beautiful"	3:35
4.	"Your Love Is Better Than Life (St. Petersburg Mix)"	3:21
5.	"City to City"	4:12
6.	"The Mission"	3:11
7.	"Secret Kingdom"	3:10
8.	"I Am Free"	5:41
9.	"In Wonder"	5:14
10.	"Let It All Come Out"	3:16
11.	"Gonna Be Alright"	2:11

== Accolades ==
In 2008, the album was nominated for a Dove Award for Pop/Contemporary Album of the Year at the 39th GMA Dove Awards.
