= Born Again (Newsboys album) =

Studio album by Newsboys
- Released: 13 July 2010
- Recorded: 2010
- Genres: Christian rock, pop rock, worship
- Length: 41:58
- Label: Inpop
- Producers: Juan Otero, Seth Mosley, Jason Halbert, Mark Heimmerman

Newsboys chronology
In the Hands of God (2009)	Born Again (2010)	God's Not Dead (2010)

Singles from Born Again
- 1. "I'll Be" Released: 6 April 2010; 2. "Born Again" Released: 18 May 2010; 3. "Way Beyond Myself" Released: 14 September 2010; 4. "We Remember" Released: 19 February 2011; 5. "Save Your Life" Released: 24 March 2011

Professional ratings
Review scores
Source	Rating
AllMusic	3.5/5 stars
Jesus Freak Hideout	3.5/5 stars

Born Again is the fourteenth studio album by the Christian rock band Newsboys. It was released on 13 July 2010 and is the first full-length album with lead singer Michael Tait, as well as the first album to feature no original members in the lineup. The group released a special five-track preview EP, also titled Born Again, on 5 January 2010. Four tracks from the EP appeared on the album. The exception, and first single released, was "I'll Be", which was made available on deluxe versions of the album. The album was later reissued as Born Again: Miracles Edition in April 2011, that included five new songs, four remixes and replaced "Impossible" with the new song, "Save Your Life". The album produced two music videos for the title track and "Miracles".

== Commercial performance ==
The album debuted at No. 4 on the Billboard 200 charts with 45,000 copies, shattering their previous peak position of No. 28 with 2009's In the Hands of God. The album also became the group's fourth No. 1 album on the Christian charts. As of 20 October 2010, the album has sold 114,863 copies.

== Track listing ==
Born Again EP
No.	Title	Writer(s)	Length
1.	"Born Again"	Michael Tait, Wes Campbell, Seth Mosley, Juan Otero	3:11
2.	"On Your Knees"	Tait, Dale Bray, Campbell, Mosley, Otero, Jacob Rye	3:28
3.	"When the Boys Light Up"	James Reyne, Steve Taylor, Tait, Campbell, Mosley, Otero	3:06
4.	"I'll Be"	Mosley, Otero	3:31
5.	"One Shot"	Tait, Campbell, Mosley, Otero	3:34

Born Again album
No.	Title	Writer(s)	Length
1.	"Born Again"	Michael Tait, Wes Campbell, Mosley, Juan Otero	3:11
2.	"One Shot"	Tait, Campbell, Mosley, Otero	3:28
3.	"Way Beyond Myself"	Tait, Campbell, Mosley, Otero	3:34
4.	"Impossible"	Theron Thomas, Timothy Thomas, Seth Mosley, Juan Otero	3:40
5.	"When the Boys Light Up"	James Reyne, Steve Taylor, Tait, Campbell, Mosley, Otero	3:07
6.	"Build Us Back"	Mark Stuart, Jason Walker	4:21
7.	"Escape"	Taylor, Tait, Campbell, Mosley, Otero	2:47
8.	"Miracles"	Tait, Campbell, Mosley, Otero	3:00
9.	"Running to You"	Tait, Campbell, Mosley, Otero	3:25
10.	"On Your Knees"	Tait, Dale Bray, Campbell, Mosley, Otero, Jake Rye	3:13
11.	"Mighty to Save"	Reuben Morgan, Ben Fielding	4:13
12.	"Jesus Freak" (featuring KJ-52) (dc Talk cover)	Toby McKeehan, Mark Heimermann	4:06
Total length:			41:59

Napster Deluxe Edition (additional tracks)
No.	Title	Writer(s)	Length
13.	"We Remember" (featuring Israel Houghton)	Mark Stuart, Jason Walker	3:43
14.	"Give Me to You"	Michael Tait, Wes Campbell, Seth Mosley, Juan Otero	4:04
15.	"I'll Be"	Mosley, Otero	3:23
16.	"Glorious" (Tait Version)	Steve Taylor, Jeff Frankenstein, Peter Furler	4:19

iTunes exclusive Deluxe Edition (additional tracks)
No.	Title	Writer(s)	Length
13.	"We Remember" (featuring Israel Houghton)	Mark Stuart, Jason Walker	3:43
14.	"Give Me to You"	Michael Tait, Wes Campbell, Seth Mosley, Juan Otero	4:04
15.	"I'll Be"	Mosley, Otero	3:23
16.	"Glorious" (Tait Version)	Steve Taylor, Jeff Frankenstein, Peter Furler	4:19
17.	"Born Again (Summertime Symphony Mix)" (Pre-Order only)	Tait, Campbell, Mosley, Otero	3:11
18.	"Born Again (Official Music Video)"		3:38
19.	"Digital Booklet"

Born Again: Miracles Edition (additional tracks)
No.	Title	Writer(s)	Length
4.	"Save Your Life"	Seth Mosley, Juan Otero, Ben Clark, Bori Afolabi	2:56
13.	"We Remember" (featuring Israel Houghton)	Mark Stuart, Jason Walker	3:43
14.	"I'll Be"	Mosley, Otero	3:23
15.	"Give Me to You"	Michael Tait, Wes Campbell, Mosley, Otero	4:04
16.	"Glorious" (Tait Version)	Steve Taylor, Jeff Frankenstein, Peter Furler	4:19
17.	"Born Again (French Horn Rebellion Remix)"	Tait, Campbell, Mosley, Otero	4:31
18.	"Miracles (Mega is a Gang Remix)"	Tait, Campbell, Mosley, Otero	3:29
19.	"Way Beyond Myself (Flatline Remix)"	Tait, Campbell, Mosley, Otero	3:56
20.	"Mighty to Save (Family Force 5 Remix)"	Reuben Morgan, Ben Fielding	3:56
21.	"Digital Booklet"
Total length:			72:31

== Personnel ==
Adapted from the album booklet.

Newsboys

- Michael Tait – lead vocals
- Jody Davis – guitars, vocals
- Jeff Frankenstein – keyboards, programming, key bass, vocals
- Duncan Phillips – drums, percussion

Additional musicians

- Leslie Jordan – additional vocals on "Give Me to You"
- Chanel Campbell – background vocals
- KJ-52 – rap on "Jesus Freak"
- Duncan Phillips – drums
- Brian Dexter – additional drums
- Brandon Romine – additional drums
- Derek Wyatt – additional drums
- Jake Harsh – additional drums, additional guitar, additional bass on "Way Beyond Myself", additional programming
- Seth Mosley – additional guitar, additional programming
- Jake Rye – additional guitar, additional programming
- Tim Pierce – additional guitar
- Jerry McPherson – additional guitar
- Jeremy McCoy – bass on "Save Your Life"
- Jonathan Surratt – strings
- Israel Houghton – background vocals on "We Remember"
- Peter Furler – backing vocals on "Glorious"

Production and design

- Seth Mosley – mixing, engineering
- Dale Bray – A&R
- Wes Campbell – manager
- David Molnar – cover photo
- Jake Rye – audio engineering, bass guitar, production
- Breezy Baldwin – additional photography, packaging design and layout
- F. Reid Shippen – mixing
- Robot Lemon Studios, Nashville, Tennessee – mixing location
- Dan Shike – mastering
- Tone & Volume, Nashville, Tennessee – mastering location
