= Devotion (Newsboys album) =

Studio album by Newsboys
- Released: 2 November 2004
- Recorded: 2003
- Genres: Christian pop, Christian rock, alternative rock
- Length: 42:09
- Label: Sparrow
- Producer: Peter Furler

Newsboys chronology
Adoration: The Worship Album (2003)	Devotion (2004)	He Reigns: The Worship Collection (2005)

Professional ratings
Review scores
Source	Rating
Cross Rhythms	10/10 stars
Jesus Freak Hideout	3/5 stars

Devotion is the eleventh studio album by Christian pop rock band Newsboys, released in November 2004. It is a follow-up album to the band's first worship-oriented project, Adoration. It was also the first and only album to feature replacement guitarist Bryan Olesen. The album debuted at No. 5 on the Top Christian Albums chart, and at No. 56 on the Billboard 200 charts. Several Christian artists made guest appearances on the album, including Rebecca St. James, Bethel World Outreach Choir, Stuart Garrard, and Jon Ellis of Tree63.

The album's artwork includes photography of the band by Jimmy Abegg on a valley floor next to the Natchez Trace Parkway Bridge in Williamson County, Tennessee. Because of the bridge's unique design which eliminates any spandrel columns, the perspective on many of the photographs leverages the non-blocked views of the scenery and sky on the far side of the bridge behind the band.

== Track listing ==
Album release
No.	Title	Writer(s)	Length
1.	"Devotion"	Peter Furler, Steve Taylor	3:58
2.	"I Love Your Ways"	Jeff Frankenstein, Furler, Phil Joel, Taylor	3:41
3.	"Presence (My Heart's Desire)"	Furler, Tim Hughes, Taylor	3:57
4.	"Strong Tower"	Furler, Taylor	4:03
5.	"God of Nations"	Furler, Taylor	3:47
6.	"Blessed Be Your Name" (featuring Rebecca St. James)	Beth Redman, Matt Redman	4:34
7.	"The Orphan"	Frankenstein, Furler, Taylor	4:05
8.	"Landslide of Love"	Frankenstein, Furler, Taylor	4:23
9.	"Name Above All Names"	Hughes	3:27
10.	"When the Tears Fall" (featuring Bethel World Outreach Choir)	Hughes	6:14
11.	"Isaiah" (iTunes exclusive)	Frankenstein, Furler, Joel, Taylor	4:24
Total length:			42:07

Note "Isaiah" was originally included as an "album only" track when Devotion was purchased from the iTunes Store. The track has since been deleted from the album and is now available only as a separate single.

== Singles ==
- "Presence (My Heart's Desire)"
- "Devotion"
- "Blessed Be Your Name"
- "Strong Tower"

== Personnel ==
Newsboys

- Peter Furler – lead vocals, guitars
- Bryan Olesen – lead guitars, vocals
- Jeff Frankenstein – keyboards
- Phil Joel – bass, vocals
- Duncan Phillips – drums, percussion

Additional musicians

- John Ellis – guitars, vocals
- Stuart Garrard – guitars
- Rebecca St. James – guest vocals on "Blessed Be Your Name"
- Bethel World Outreach Choir – choir (10)

Production

- Peter Furler – producer
- Wes Campbell – executive producer
- Steve Taylor – executive producer
- Joe Baldridge – recording at Bridge Sound Studios, Nashville, Tennessee
- Dan Rudin – recording, mixing at Bridge Sound Studios, Nashville, Tennessee (7)
- Sam Gibson – mixing at Chapel Lane Studios, Hereford, UK (1–6, 8–10)
- Bob Ludwig – mastering at Gateway Mastering, Portland, Maine
- Jan Cook – creative director
- Benji Peck – art direction, design
- Jimmy Abegg – photography
