= Hell Is for Wimps =

Studio album by Newsboys
- Released: 1990
- Recorded: 1990
- Genre: Christian pop
- Label: Star Song
- Producer: Michael Gleason

Newsboys chronology
Read All About It (1988)	Hell Is for Wimps (1990)	Boys Will Be Boyz (1991)

Professional ratings
Review scores
Source	Rating
AllMusic	2/5 stars
Cross Rhythms	4/10 stars

Hell Is for Wimps is the second studio album by Christian pop rock band Newsboys. It was released in 1990 by Star Song Records.

== Track listing ==
All tracks are written by Peter Furler, John James, Sean Taylor and Wes Campbell except where noted.

No.	Title	Writer(s)	Length
1.	"Stand Up for Jesus"		3:48
2.	"In the End"		3:14
3.	"Simple Man"		3:42
4.	"All I Can See"	Furler; James; Taylor; Campbell; Billy Smiley	4:51
5.	"Ten Thousand Miles"		3:54
6.	"Something's Missing"		2:45
7.	"Get Up for Love"	Furler; James; Taylor; Campbell; Smiley	3:15
8.	"Sea of Love"	Furler; James; Taylor; Campbell; Smiley	3:13
9.	"Love You Tomorrow"	Furler; James; Taylor; Campbell; Smiley	3:34
10.	"Victory"		4:16
Total length:			36:33

== Personnel ==
=== Newsboys ===
- Sean Taylor – bass
- John James – lead vocals
- Peter Furler – drums, backing vocals
- Jonathan Geange – guitars

=== Additional musicians ===
- Michael Gleason – keyboards, backing vocals
- Sonny Lallerstedt – acoustic guitar, electric guitar
- George Perdikis – guitars (10)

=== Production ===
- Michael Gleason – producer
- Dez Dickerson – executive producer
- Jeff Moseley – executive producer
- Sonny Lallerstedt – recording, mixing
- Denny Purcell – mastering
- David Perdkis – drum technician
- Toni Thigpen – art direction, design
- Todd Tufts – illustration
