= Love Liberty Disco =

Studio album by Newsboys
- Released: 16 November 1999
- Recorded: 1998–1999
- Studios: Earfull Studios, Franklin, Tennessee; White House Recording Studio, Nashville, Tennessee
- Genres: Contemporary Christian music, Christian pop, Britpop
- Length: 35:37
- Label: Sparrow
- Producer: Peter Furler

Newsboys chronology
Step Up to the Microphone (1998)	Love Liberty Disco (1999)	Shine: The Hits (2000)

Professional ratings
Review scores
Source	Rating
AllMusic	3/5 stars
Cross Rhythms	9/10 stars
Jesus Freak Hideout	3.5/5 stars

Love Liberty Disco is the eighth studio album by Christian pop rock band Newsboys, released in 1999. In stark contrast to the band's usual pop rock sound, Love Liberty Disco focuses on 1970s era-inspired sounds and disco.

== Track listing ==
Album release
No.	Title	Writer(s)	Length
1.	"Beautiful Sound"	Peter Furler, Philip Urry	3:46
2.	"Love Liberty Disco"	Furler, Jeff Frankenstein, Jody Davis, Duncan Phillips, Urry	3:43
3.	"Forever Man"	Furler, Urry	3:13
4.	"Good Stuff"	Furler, Urry	2:59
5.	"Everyone's Someone"	Furler, Urry	5:14
6.	"Say You Need Love"	Furler, Urry	3:18
7.	"I Would Give Everything"	Furler, Urry	3:22
8.	"Break"	Furler, Urry	3:20
9.	"I Surrender All"	Furler, John P. Kee	4:12
10.	"Fall on You"	Furler, Urry	2:30
Total length:			35:39

== Music videos ==
- "Love Liberty Disco"

== Radio singles ==
- "Love Liberty Disco" (1999)
  - peaked at No. 5 on CCM's Christian CHR chart, and later appeared on the WOW 2000 compilation album
- "Beautiful Sound" (2000)
  - Peaked at No. 6 on CCM's Christian AC chart, and No. 1 for 2 weeks on the Christian CHR chart. The song also appeared on the WOW Hits 2001 compilation album.
- "I Surrender All" / "Good Stuff" (2000)
  - Released as a double A-side single, with the former geared towards AC radio, and the latter towards the CHR and rock formats. While "I Surrender All" did not chart on any of CCM's Christian charts, "Good Stuff" peaked at No. 14 on the Christian Rock chart and No. 1 on the Christian CHR chart.

== Personnel ==
Newsboys

- Peter Furler – lead vocals, guitars, drums
- Phil Joel – bass, vocals
- Jody Davis – guitars, vocals
- Jeff Frankenstein – keyboards, programming
- Duncan Phillips – drums, percussion, electronic percussion

Additional musicians

- Tedd Tjornhom – programming
- Tim Ruther – decks on "Good Stuff"
- Steve Hindalong – guest percussion on "Break"
- Blair Masters – string arrangements
- Nashville String Machine – strings

Production

- Peter Furler – producer
- Wes Campbell – executive producer
- Lynn Nichols – executive producer
- Shane D. Wilson – recording, mixing
- White House Recording Studio, Nashville, Tennessee – recording location
- Earfull Studios, Franklin, Tennessee – recording location
- Russ Long – additional recording
- Tara Wilson – assistant engineer
- Stephen Marcussen – mastering
- A&M Mastering Studio, Hollywood, California – mastering location
- Christiév Carothers – creative direction
- Jan Cook – art direction
- Dan Harding – album design
- Michael Riuz – photography
