= Go (Newsboys album) =

GO

Studio album by Newsboys
- Released: 31 October 2006
- Recorded: 2005
- Genres: Christian rock, pop rock
- Length: 39:53
- Label: Inpop
- Producers: Tedd T., Peter Furler

Newsboys chronology
He Reigns: The Worship Collection (2005)	GO (2006)	GO Remixed (2007)

Go is the twelfth studio album by Christian pop rock band Newsboys, released on 31 October 2006. It is the band's last album with Phil Joel as a member until 2019's United (though he would make a guest appearance on the band's following album, In the Hands of God), and their only album with Paul Colman.

An EP, entitled Go EP, was released on the iTunes Store as a preview of the album. It featured the songs "Wherever We Go", "Go (I Wanna Send You)", and "I Am Free" from the album. On 30 September 2008, nearly a year after its release, it spawned its own live CD/DVD, Houston We Are GO.

The album produced one music video for the single, "Something Beautiful".

== Album cover ==
The album cover features the band on their corresponding color motif. Frankenstein in red, Furler in green, Joel in blue, Colman in gray, and Phillips in yellow. The photo was then reused and rereleased for the 2008 live album Houston We Are GO albeit without Joel.

== Singles ==
A live version of "I Am Free" (cover of Desperation Band song) was released as a single to radio stations long before the release of the album (early 2006), and peaked at No. 11 on Billboard's Hot Christian Songs chart, as well as No. 11 on the Hot Christian Adult Contemporary charts.

The second single, "Wherever We Go", was released to radio stations on 18 August 2006, and has peaked at No. 3 on the Hot Christian Songs chart and No. 15 on the Hot Christian Adult Contemporary charts.

"Something Beautiful" was released as the third promotional single for GO in early 2007, and peaked at No. 4 on Billboard's Hot Christian Songs chart, and at No. 6 on the Hot Christian Adult Contemporary charts. The song also finished at No. 5 on the 2007 year-end chart for Hot Christian Songs.

"In Wonder" was released between late summer and early fall of 2007 as the fourth single to radio to promote the album. It peaked at No. 6 on Billboard's Hot Christian Songs chart, and No. 5 on the Hot Christian Adult Contemporary charts. It is a new version of a song written in 2004 by New Zealand band Magnify. Rick Knott, lead singer of Magnify, is noted as one of the authors of the track on the Newsboys album. The lyrics on the new song are different from the original song, however, the backing track is nearly identical.

== Critical reception ==
Professional ratings
Review scores
Source	Rating
Allmusic	4/5 stars
Cross Rhythms	8/10 stars
Jesus Freak Hideout	4.5/5 stars

Reviews were generally positive, especially in the Christian market, where the band was praised for getting back to its original rock roots. Jesus Freak Hideout gave the album 4.5 out of 5 stars and raved “Catchy, fun, worshipful, encouraging, and memorable, GO is liable to cause longtime fans to join me in saying, ‘Hallelujah, the Newsboys are back!’” CCM Magazine had similar praise to offer, remarking in their review that the band has "returned in what’s arguably its best creative offering since 1998’s Step Up to the Microphone. The group achieves the rare distinction of having a cross generational impact, maintaining its old school die-hards, while giving the younger crew something substantial to sink their teeth into."

"Go" was New Release Tuesday's "Album of the Year" in 2006.

== Commercial performance ==
Selling 23,246 units in its first week (their best sales week since Adoration's release in 2003), Go debuted at No. 51 on the Billboard 200 charts, and at No. 4 on the Top Christian Albums chart. Go fell to No. 6 in its second week on the Christian chart and No. 9 in its third, but rose to No. 8 in its fourth week.

After two months of release, "Go" had sold over 100,000 copies at an average of 15,000 per week.

== Track listing ==
No.	Title	Writer(s)	Length
1.	"Wherever We Go"	Peter Furler, Tedd Tjornhom, Lynn Nichols, Philip Urry, Steve Taylor	3:27
2.	"Go"	Furler, Tjornhom, Taylor	2:52
3.	"Something Beautiful"	Paul Colman, Furler	3:51
4.	"The Mission"	Taylor, Furler	3:40
5.	"Let It All Come Out"	Furler	4:20
6.	"In Wonder"	Taylor, Furler, Richard Knott	4:12
7.	"Your Love Is Better Than Life"	Taylor, Colman, Urry, Peter Furler, Summer Furler	3:39
8.	"I Am Free" (Desperation Band cover)	Jonathan Egan	3:36
9.	"Secret Kingdom"	Taylor, Furler	3:21
10.	"The Letter (One of a Kind)"	Furler	3:22
11.	"Gonna Be Alright"	Furler, Tjornhom, Colman	3:33
Total length:			39:53

Limited edition bonus tracks
No.	Title	Length
12.	"I Am Free" (Live) (Desperation Band cover)	7:05
13.	"Something to Believe In"	3:22
14.	"City to City"	3:54
Total length:		54:18

== Personnel ==
Newsboys

- Peter Furler – lead vocals, guitars, drums
- Paul Colman – vocals, lead guitars
- Jeff Frankenstein – keyboards, programming
- Phil Joel – vocals, bass guitar
- Duncan Phillips – drums, percussion

Guest performers

- Lynn Nichols – guitar (1)
- Evie Tornquist – vocals (11)

Production

- Peter Furler – producer, additional recording
- Tedd T. – producer, recording at Antenna Studios, Nashville, Tennessee
- Dale Bray – executive producer
- Wes Campbell – executive producer
- Dave Wagner – executive producer
- F. Reid Shippen – mixing at Sound Stage Studios, Nashville, Tennessee (1, 2, 3, 5–11)
- Stephen Lotz – mix assistant (1, 2, 3, 5–11)
- Tom Lord-Alge – mixing at South Beach Studios, Miami Beach, Florida (4)
- Femio Hernandez – mix assistant (4)
- Bob Ludwig – mastering at Gateway Mastering, Portland, Maine
- Stephen Dix – art direction, design
- Craig A. Mason – additional design
- David Dobson – photography
- Rebecca Colman – additional photography
