= Not Ashamed =

Studio album by Newsboys
- Released: 29 September 1992
- Recorded: 1991–1992
- Genre: Christian rock, Christian pop
- Length: 42:07
- Label: Star Song
- Producer: Steve Taylor, Peter Furler

Newsboys chronology
Boys Will Be Boyz (1991)	Not Ashamed (1992)	Going Public (1994)

Professional ratings
Review scores
Source	Rating
AllMusic	2.5/5 stars
Cross Rhythms	8/10 stars
Jesus Freak Hideout	3/5 stars

Not Ashamed is the fourth studio album by Australian CCM band Newsboys, released in 1992. The album was the Newsboys' first commercially successful album, with "I'm Not Ashamed" becoming a hit on Christian radio. With this album, producer Steve Taylor started co-writing many of the band's songs with Peter Furler, who also began sharing lead vocals duties with then-primary vocalist John James.

== Track listing ==
Album release
No.	Title	Writer(s)	Lead vocals	Length
1.	"I Cannot Get You Out of My System"	Vernon Bishop, Peter Furler, Steve Taylor	Peter Furler	3:18
2.	"I'm Not Ashamed"	Furler, Taylor	Peter Furler	3:52
3.	"Where You Belong" / "Turn Your Eyes Upon Jesus"	Furler, Helen H. Lemmel, Taylor	John James & Peter Furler	5:32
4.	"Upon This Rock"	Furler, Dwight Liles, Corey Pryor, Taylor	John James	4:39
5.	"Strong Love"	Furler, Toby McKeehan, Taylor	Peter Furler	4:02
6.	"Dear Shame"	Furler, Taylor	John James & Peter Furler	3:50
7.	"Boycott Hell"	DeGarmo, Key, Furler, Taylor	John James & Steve Taylor	3:41
8.	"We Come Together"	Furler, Taylor	Peter Furler	4:36
9.	"Love Comes True"	Furler, Taylor	John James & Peter Furler	3:32
10.	"Lost the Sky Again"	Furler, Taylor	Steve Taylor & Peter Furler	5:05
Total length:				42:07

=== Note ===
On "Where You Belong" / "Turn Your Eyes Upon Jesus" John James has the lead vocals on "Where You Belong" and Peter Furler on "Turn Your Eyes Upon Jesus". On "Boycott Hell" Steve Taylor's part is a rap.

=== Music videos ===
- "I Cannot Get You Out of My System"
- "I'm Not Ashamed"
- "Where You Belong"/"Turn Your Eyes Upon Jesus"
- "Dear Shame"

== Radio singles ==
Note: all CCM Magazine chart information is available in the book Hot Hits CHR 1978–1997 (1997) by Jeffrey Lee Brothers

Single	CCM Chart	Debut	Peak date	Peak position
"I'm Not Ashamed"	CHR	19 October 1992	30 November 1992	1
"I'm Not Ashamed"	AC	9 November 1992	16 November 1992	36
"Where You Belong/Turn Your Eyes Upon Jesus"	AC	25 January 1993	22 March 1993	10
"Where You Belong/Turn Your Eyes Upon Jesus"	CHR	8 February 1993	1 March 1993	9
"Upon This Rock"	CHR	31 May 1993	12 July 1993	4
"Strong Love"	AC	5 July 1993	9 August 1993	10
"I Cannot Get You Out of My System"	Rock	2 August 1993	9 August 1993	16
"Dear Shame"	CHR	18 October 1993	8 November 1993	11

== Personnel ==
Newsboys

- John James – lead vocals
- Peter Furler – drums, vocals, programming
- Corey Pryor – keyboards, samples, programming
- Sean Taylor – bass, backing vocals

Additional musicians

- Dave Perkins – guitars
- Phil Madeira – Hammond organ, acoustic piano, slide guitar
- Eric Darken – percussion
- Russ Long – tambourine (7)
- John Mark Painter – Mellotron, clavinet, trumpet, bass (1, 5, 7, 8)
- Blair Masters – E-mu Emulator
- Tony Miracle – E-mu Emulator
- Danny Duncan – additional programming (2, 4, 6)
- Steve Lennox – additional programming (2, 4, 6)
- Vicki Hampton – backing vocals
- Fleming McWilliams – backing vocals on "Upon This Rock", soprano vocals on "I'm Not Ashamed"
- Steve Taylor – backing vocals, rap on "Boycott Hell," verses on "Lost the Sky Again"

Production

- Peter Furler – producer
- Steve Taylor – producer
- Wes Campbell – executive producer
- Darrell A. Harris – executive producer
- Russ Long – engineer
- Mike Alvord – assistant engineer
- Rick Cobble – assistant engineer
- John Rogers – assistant engineer
- Shane Wilson – assistant engineer
- Quad Studios, Nashville, Tennessee – recording location
- The Bute, Nashville, Tennessee – recording location
- 16th Avenue Sound, Nashville, Tennessee – recording location
- Ron Christopher – mixing
- Alan Shacklock – mixing
- Bosstown Studios, Atlanta, Georgia – mixing location
- Bob Ludwig – mastering at Masterdisk, New York City
- Toni Thigpen – creative director
- Jeff Fraizer – photography
- Griffin Norman – art direction and design for IKON

== Not Ashamed: The Video ==
Not Ashamed: The Video is Newsboys' second video, released in late 1993. Like Boys Will Be Boyz, it also includes a bonus video of "Simple Man" from Hell Is for Wimps. The cover art was designed by Brian Dominey and photographed by Jeff Frazier. It was distributed as a NTSC VHS tape in stereo.

=== Track listing ===
- "I'm Not Ashamed"
- "I Cannot Get You Out of My System"
- "Dear Shame"
- "Where You Belong/Turn Your Eyes Upon Jesus"
- "Simple Man"
- "Other Fun Stuff"
