= Dan Rudin =

American record producer and audio and mix engineer

Dan Rudin is an American record producer, audio and mix engineer.

== Life ==
Rudin began his recording career working as a studio runner and general assistant at AAA Recording Studio, in Dorchester, Massachusetts, while still in high school. After studying music and electrical engineering at the University of Miami in Miami, Florida, he moved to New York, New York in 1986, where he took an entry-level position at the Hit Factory studios on 54th St. He went on to work at New York's Record Plant Studios and eventually became chief staff engineer at Grandslam Recording in West Orange, New Jersey.

Since 1989, Rudin has resided in Nashville, Tennessee. Working as a freelance engineer and producer in studios around the city and around the country, he worked on many projects in rock, pop, gospel and jazz recording. He became a contributor to projects by producers Richard Dodd, Peter Furler, Tommy Simms, Chris McDonald and Joe Baldridge. In 2006, he opened his own recording facility, My Space Recording, at the former site of Nashville's Money Pit studio.

Rudin's record and film client list includes The Loudhorns, Tempest, Riders In The Sky, Pixar, High School Musical 2, Chayenne, Matt Belsante, Tommy Torres, Billy Dean, Wynonna, Flick, The Newsboys, Puffy AmiYumi, Alberto Plaza and Disney, original scores for films Boundin', Sioux City and The Pirates Who Don’t Do Anything.
