= Adoration: The Worship Album =

Studio album by Newsboys
- Released: 8 April 2003
- Recorded: 2002
- Genres: Christian rock, Christian pop, contemporary worship music
- Length: 43:41
- Label: Sparrow
- Producers: Steve Taylor, Peter Furler

Newsboys chronology
Newsboys Remixed (2002)	Adoration: The Worship Album (2003)	Devotion (2004)

Professional ratings
Review scores
Source	Rating
AllMusic	4/5 stars
Cross Rhythms'	9/10 stars
Jesus Freak Hideout	4.5/5 stars

Adoration: The Worship Album is the tenth studio album by the Christian pop rock band Newsboys, released in 2003. Unlike the band's previous albums, Adoration is a solely worship-oriented album (as the subtitle implies), deviating from the Newsboys' standard pop rock sound. This was the last Newsboys' album with the long-time guitarist Jody Davis due to his daughter’s sickness, until his reunion with the group in 2009 for In the Hands of God.

== Track listing ==
Album release
No.	Title	Writer(s)	Length
1.	"He Reigns"	Peter Furler, Steve Taylor	4:55
2.	"You Are My King (Amazing Love)"	Billy James Foote	4:31
3.	"Great Is Your Faithfulness"	Furler, Taylor	3:17
4.	"Take My Hands (Praises)"	Furler, Toby McKeehan, Martin Smith, Taylor	4:22
5.	"Adoration"	Furler, Taylor	4:22
6.	"In Christ Alone"	Keith Getty, Stuart Townend	4:17
7.	"Lord (I Don't Know)" (Live)	Furler, Taylor	4:24
8.	"It Is You" (Live)	Furler, Taylor	6:18
9.	"Father, Blessed Father"	Furler	3:59
10.	"Hallelujah"	Furler	3:16
Total length:			43:41

=== Music videos ===
- "He Reigns"

== Radio singles ==
- "He Reigns"
- "You Are My King (Amazing Love)"
- "In Christ Alone"
- "Adoration"

== Personnel ==
Newsboys

- Peter Furler – lead vocals, guitars, drums
- Phil Joel – bass guitar, guitars, vocals
- Duncan Phillips – drums, percussion
- Jody Davis – guitars, vocals
- Jeff Frankenstein – keyboards, programming

Additional vocals

- The Nathan Young Gospel Choir – choir (1, 7–10)
  - Brandon Alexander
  - Anthony Davis
  - San Franklin-Stancil
  - Yvonne Hodges
  - Gale Mayes West
  - Ann McCrary
  - Wess Morgan
  - Angela Primm
  - Duawne Starling
  - Chris Willis
  - Nathan Young
  - Suzanne Young
- Blair Children's Chorus – choir (5)
- Pam Schneller – choir director (5)

Production

- Peter Furler – producer
- Steve Taylor – producer
- Wes Campbell – executive producer
- Lynn Nichols – executive producer
- Dan Rudin – recording (1–6, 9, 10)
- Scott Kidd – recording assistant (1–6, 9, 10)
- Joe Baldridge – live recording (7, 8)
- Chuck Dennie – live recording assistant (7, 8)
- David Thoener – mixing at Sound Stage Studios, Nashville, Tennessee
- Jim Cooley – mix assistant
- Bob Ludwig – mastering at Gateway Mastering, Portland, Maine
- Jan Cook – creative director
- Benji Peck – art direction, design
- Matthew Barnes – photography
- First Company Management – management

Studios

- Bridge Sound Studios, Nashville, Tennessee – recording studio
- Emerald Sound Studios, Nashville, Tennessee – recording studio
- Sound Emporium, Nashville, Tennessee – recording studio
