= Phil Joel =

New Zealand musician (born 1973)

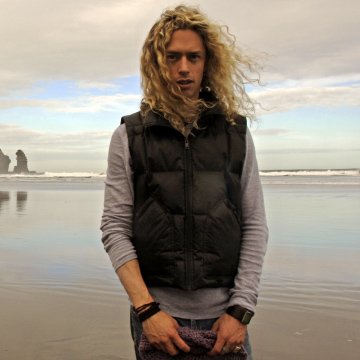
- Joel at Piha beach in New Zealand, 2007

Background information
- Born: Philip Joel Urry; January 5, 1973 (age 53)
- Origin: Auckland, New Zealand
- Genres: Christian pop
- Occupations: Singer-songwriter, musician
- Instruments: Vocals; bass guitar; guitar
- Years active: 1990s–present
- Labels: Inpop, Curb
- Member of: Peter Furler Band, Zealand Worship
- Formerly of: Newsboys, Drinkwater
- Website: www.philjoel.com www.zealand.band

Philip Joel Urry (born 5 January 1973) is a New Zealand musician known as the former bassist and vocalist for the Christian rock group Newsboys.

== Background ==
Philip Joel Urry was born in Auckland, New Zealand. He was lead singer and guitarist for the band Drinkwater, of which released their eponymous six-track EP in 1991 and a full length CD, Three Murky Vibes, in 1993.

Urry was recruited as bass player for Newsboys after the band noticed him during Drinkwater's 1994 opening slot for Newsboys in Auckland. Urry moved to the United States to join the Newsboys on August 13, 1994 and soon after starting going by his middle name Joel to avoid potential pronunciation issues.

In June 2000, Joel released his first solo album, Watching Over You, on Inpop Records. He supported this album with the Strangely Normal Tour accompanied by LaRue, Luna Halo, Earthsuit, V*Enna, and Katy Hudson (later known as Katy Perry).

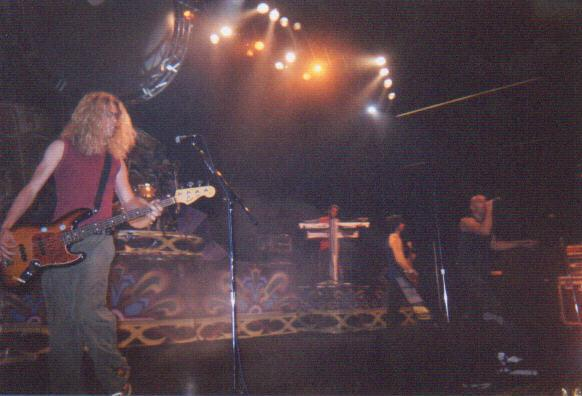
Newsboys at the 2001 National Lutheran Youth Gathering, with Phil Joel in the foreground

Joel's second solo album, Bring It On, was released in November 2002 also on Inpop. His third album, The deliberatePeople. Album was released on 18 November 2005 in conjunction with Phil and Heather Joel's newly founded Christian ministry, deliberatePeople. The album was praised for its stripped down rock, reminiscent of the Jesus Music era of Christian Music.

Joel's wife, Heather, is a former host of All Access and Hit Trip on CMT. He met Heather at a radio station in her native Kansas. They were married in 1996 and have two children.

In December 2006, Joel announced that he would be leaving the Newsboys in order to devote more time to his family. In September 2008, Joel released his fifth solo CD titled The New Normal, which was his third self-produced album.

Joel began the project Zealand Worship in 2015.

In December 2017 it was announced that Joel would be joining his former Newsboys band mates on the year-long Newsboys United tour.

Joel's debut book, Redwoods & Whales, was released by Thomas Nelson on 16 April 2019.

In 2020, while much of the world was experiencing lockdowns due to the COVID-19 pandemic, Joel took part in "The Blessing - Aotearoa/New Zealand", a virtual choir featuring over 200 New Zealanders performing "The Blessing". Performers from various churches and denominations across New Zealand submitted a video of themselves performing the song, which was then edited into a cohesive video. This was inspired by the many countries who had done the same.

In January 2021 Joel returned to his solo career, releasing the EP Better Than I Found It, which he recorded in his home studio during lockdown in Franklin, Tennessee.

== Discography ==
=== Drinkwater ===
- Drinkwater (independent cassette EP, 1991)
- Three Murky Vibes (independent CD album, 1993)

=== Zealand Worship ===
- Zealand Worship - The EP (Word Records/Warner Bros. Records, 2015)
- Liberated (Word Records/Warner Bros. Records, 2018)

=== Newsboys ===
- Take Me To Your Leader (Star Song Communications, 1996)
- Step Up to the Microphone (Sparrow Records, 1998)
- Love Liberty Disco (Sparrow Records, 1999)
- Thrive (Sparrow Records, 2002)
- Adoration: The Worship Album (Sparrow Records, 2003)
- Devotion (Sparrow Records, 2004)
- Go (Inpop Records, 2006)
- United (Fair Trade Services, 2019)

=== Solo Albums ===
- Watching Over You (Inpop Records, 2000)
- Bring it On (Inpop Records, 2002)
- The deliberatePeople. Album (2005)
- deliberateKids (2007)
- The New Normal (2008)
- deliberateKids 2 (2010)
- Playlist (2012)
- Better Than I Found It EP (2021)

=== Singles ===
- "Don't Look Now" (Drinkwater, 1993, Three Murky Vibes) – New Zealand Rock Radio airplay
- "God Is Watching Over You" (2000, Watching Over You) – Christian CHR No. 2, Christian AC No. 9
- "Strangely Normal" (2000, Watching Over You) – Christian CHR No. 5
- "Author of Life" (2000, Watching Over You)
- "Be Number One" (2000, Watching Over You)
- "I Adore You" (2002, Bring It On) – Christian AC No. 21
- "Resolution" (2002, Bring It On)
- "No Longer" (2002, Bring It On)
- "The Man You Want Me to Be" (2002, Bring It On) – Billboard Christian Songs No. 22, Christian AC No. 15
- "Changed" (2006, The deliberatePeople. Album)
- "Good Good Father" (2015, Zealand Worship - The EP)
- "Your Love is Wild" (2016, Your Love is Wild - Single)
- "Spirit Sing" (2018, Liberated)
