= Going Public (Newsboys album) =

Studio album by Newsboys
- Released: 26 July 1994
- Recorded: 1993
- Genre: Christian pop, Christian rock
- Length: 36:34
- Label: Star Song
- Producer: Steve Taylor, Peter Furler

Newsboys chronology
Not Ashamed (1992)	Going Public (1994)	Take Me to Your Leader (1996)

Professional ratings
Review scores
Source	Rating
AllMusic	4/5 stars
Blaze Magazine	No Rating
Cross Rhythms	10/10 stars
Jesus Freak Hideout	4/5 stars

Going Public is the fifth studio album by Christian pop rock band Newsboys, released in 1994. The album was the band's second commercial success (following Not Ashamed), and it featured "Shine," one of their most popular songs.

The album was recognized with two Dove Awards at the 25th GMA Dove Awards, one for "Rock Album of the Year", and the other "Rock Recorded Song of the Year" for "Shine", as well as nominations for Short Form Music Video of the Year ("Shine") and Song of the Year ("Shine"). Going Public was also nominated for a Grammy, for Best Rock Gospel Album.

In 2001, Going Public was recognized by CCM Magazine as one of the 100 Greatest Albums in Christian Music (appearing at No. 70 on the list), and in 2006, "Shine" was included at No. 9 on CCM Magazine's 100 Greatest Songs of Christian Music.

The CD was recently included as the first in a series of influential Christian albums in Blaze magazine's Blast from the past section, saying that modern Christian artists owe a lot to the path this album created, because it "...showed music from a Godly perspective could sound extremely catchy, have lyrics that were honest and still glorify God".

According to the liner notes the cover photo was taken at a 1948 Post-World War II meeting in Germany which was conducted by the Rev. George A Palmer for the European Evangelical Crusade.

== Track listing ==
No.	Title	Writer(s)	Lead vocals	Length
1.	"Real Good Thing"	Steve Taylor, Peter Furler, Jody Davis	Peter Furler	2:53
2.	"Shine"	Steve Taylor, Peter Furler	Peter Furler	3:42
3.	"Spirit Thing"	Steve Taylor, Peter Furler	Peter Furler	3:27
4.	"Let It Rain"	Steve Taylor, Peter Furler	Peter Furler	4:17
5.	"Going Public"	Steve Taylor, Peter Furler	John James	3:30
6.	"Truth and Consequences"	Steve Taylor, Peter Furler	Peter Furler	2:58
7.	"Lights Out"	Peter Furler, Steve Taylor	John James	3:09
8.	"Be Still"	Steve Taylor, Peter Furler	Peter Furler, John James	3:19
9.	"When You Called My Name"	Steve Taylor, Peter Furler	John James	4:02
10.	"Elle G."	Steve Taylor, Peter Furler, Wade Jaynes	Peter Furler	5:12
Total length:				36:34

== Personnel ==
Newsboys

- John James – lead vocals, backing vocals
- Peter Furler – lead vocals, backing vocals, drums, programming
- Kevin Mills – bass, backing vocals
- Duncan Phillips – keyboards, backing vocals
- Jody Davis – guitar, backing vocals
- Jeff Frankenstein – touring, keyboards, additional programming (Note: Frankenstein joined the band during the final recording stages of the album, and didn't play on the tracks, but is still mentioned in the liner notes.)

Additional musicians

- Blair Masters
- Danny Duncan
- Darrell A. Harris
- Phil Madeira
- John Mark Painter
- Kenny Greenberg
- Dave Perkins
- Wade Jaynes
- Eric Darken
- Russ Long
- Vicki Hampton
- Kim Keyes

Production

- Peter Furler – producer, cover concept
- Steve Taylor – producer, cover concept
- Wes Campbell – executive producer, management
- Darrell A. Harris – executive producer
- Russ Long – engineer, mixing
- Wayne Mehl – additional engineer
- Lisa Miller – additional engineer
- Martin Woodlee – additional engineer
- Bob Ludwig – mastering
- Laura E. Cobble – project coordinator
- Toni Fitzpenn – creative director
- Franke Design, Co. – design
- Dave Perkins – cover photography
- Norman Jean Roy – band photography

Studios

- Recorded at The Dugout, The Saltmine, The Tube, The Carport and Quad Studios, all in Nashville, Tennessee
- Mixed at The Carport
- Mastered at Gateway Mastering, Portland, Maine

== Charts ==
=== Singles ===
Note: all CCM Magazine chart information is available in the book Hot Hits CHR 1978–1997 (1997) by Jeffrey Lee Brothers

Single	CCM Chart	Debut	Peak date	Peak position
"Be Still"	AC	8/15/94	9/26/94	14
"Be Still"	CHR	8/22/94	10/10/94	2
"Be Still"	Inspirational	9/5/94	10/10/94	7
"Shine"	CHR	11/7/94	1/2/95	1
"Let It Rain"	CHR	1/23/95	3/6/95	7
"Let It Rain"	AC	1/23/95	2/13/95	21
"Spirit Thing"	CHR	4/17/95	5/29/95	1
"Lights Out"	Rock	7/3/95	8/21/95	3
"Real Good Thing"	CHR	8/7/95	9/11/95	1
"Truth and Consequences"	CHR	10/9/95	11/13/95	1
"Going Public"	—	—	—	—

== Music videos ==
- "Shine"
