= Take Me to Your Leader (Newsboys album) =

Studio album by Newsboys
- Released: 20 February 1996
- Recorded: 1995–1996
- Studios: The Sanctuary Studios, Nashville, Tennessee
- Genres: Christian rock, Christian pop
- Length: 37:00
- Label: Star Song
- Producers: Steve Taylor, Peter Furler

Newsboys chronology
Going Public (1994)	Take Me to Your Leader (1996)	Step Up to the Microphone (1998)

Take Me to Your Leader is the sixth studio album by Christian pop rock band Newsboys, released in 1996. It was both the last Newsboys album to feature lead vocalist John James and the first to feature bassist/vocalist Phil Joel. The album won a Dove Award in 1997 for its packaging, and was also nominated for "Rock Album of the Year", "Rock Recorded Song of the Year" ("God Is Not a Secret") and "Short Form Music Video of the Year" (for "Take Me to Your Leader"). The album was also recognized with a Grammy nomination for "Best Rock Gospel Album". Before the release of United in 2019, it was the band's only album as a sextet.

The vehicle pictured is an X-PAK 400, created by George Barris in the early 1960s during the Battle of Air Cars. This car appears on a stage in "Hangover" (season 1, episode 12 of the Alfred Hitchcock Hour). Also in this episode, actor Tony Randall, as Hadley Purvis, says the phrase "Take me to your leader."

== Reception ==
Professional ratings
Review scores
Source	Rating
AllMusic	2/5 stars
Cross Rhythms	10/10 stars
Jesus Freak Hideout	4.5/5 stars

== Track listing ==
No.	Title	Lyrics	Music	Lead vocals	Length
1.	"God Is Not a Secret"	Taylor and Furler	Furler	Furler	3:09
2.	"Take Me to Your Leader"	Taylor and Furler	Furler	James and Joel	2:58
3.	"Breathe"	Joel and Furler	Furler	Furler	3:15
4.	"Reality"	Taylor and Furler	Furler	James and Furler	3:08
5.	"Breakfast"	Taylor and Furler	Furler	Furler	3:40
6.	"Let It Go"	Taylor and Furler	Furler and Frankenstein	Furler and Joel	3:38
7.	"Cup O' Tea"	Furler and Joel	Furler	Furler	2:40
8.	"It's All Who You Know"	Taylor	Furler	Furler	3:11
9.	"Miracle Child"	Taylor and Furler	Davis and Furler	James	3:10
10.	"Lost the Plot"	Taylor and Furler	Furler	Furler	4:56
11.	"Breathe (Benediction)"	Joel and Furler	Furler	Joel	3:15
Total length:					37:00

=== Music videos ===
- "Take Me to Your Leader"

== Radio singles ==
Aside from "Miracle Child," which was not released as a radio single, every track from Take Me to Your Leader became a top ten hit on at least one of CCM Magazine's Christian charts (either the CHR, adult contemporary, or rock format).

Note: all CCM Magazine' chart information is available in the book Hot Hits CHR 1978-1997 (1997) by Jeffrey Lee Brothers

Single	CCM chart	Debut	Peak date	Peak position
"Reality"	CHR	12 February 1996	1 April 1996	1
"Reality"	AC	19 February 1996	1 April 1996	9
"God Is Not a Secret"	Rock	26 February 1996	29 April 1996	2
"Take Me to Your Leader"	CHR	29 April 1996	24 June 1996	1
"Take Me to Your Leader"	AC	20 May 1996	6 June 1996	37
"Cup O' Tea"	Rock	29 July 1996	16 September 1996	1
"Let It Go"	CHR	5 August 1996	23 September 1996	1
"Let It Go"	AC	5 August 1996	23 September 1996	4
"Let It Go"	Inspirational	16 September 1996	23 September 1996	21
"Lost the Plot"	Rock	21 October 1996	6 January 1997	2
"Breakfast"	CHR	4 November 1996	6 January 1997	4
"Breathe"	Rock	27 January 1997	17 March 1997	1
"Breathe (Benediction)"	CHR	10 February 1997	24 March 1997	2
"It's All Who You Know"	CHR	16 June 1997	14 June 1997	6

== Personnel ==
Newsboys

- John James – lead vocals, backing vocals
- Peter Furler – drums, lead vocals, backing vocals, guitar, keyboards, harmonica, kazoo, whistling
- Jody Davis – guitar, backing vocals
- Duncan Phillips – percussion
- Jeff Frankenstein – keyboards
- Phil Joel – bass, lead vocals, backing vocals, whistling

Production

- Peter Furler – producer
- Steve Taylor – producer, engineer
- Wes Campbell – executive producer, management, vocal recording (5)
- Darrell Harris – executive producer
- Russ Long – vocal recording (5)
- Jeff Nolte – vocal recording (5), production manager
- Steve Broadway – recording assistant
- John Caudill – recording assistant
- Annette Cisneros – recording assistant
- Dennis Desmet – recording assistant
- Mitch Eaton – recording assistant
- Scott Feltheim – recording assistant
- Brian Jerden – recording assistant
- Shane Johnson – recording assistant
- Tim Jordan – recording assistant
- William Stace – recording assistant
- Cindy Sutton – recording assistant
- Jamie Tate – recording assistant
- Tom Lord-Alge – mixing
- Mauricio Iragorri – mix assistant
- Pete Martinez – mix assistant
- Juan Rosario – mix assistant
- Cesar Sogbe – mix assistant
- Bob Ludwig – mastering at Gateway Mastering, Portland, Maine
- Debby Austin – project coordinator
- Toni Fitzpenn – art direction
- Joel Anderson – design
- George Barris – cover photography
- Michael Wilson – band photography
- Norman Jean Roy – additional photography

Studios

- The Sanctuary, Nashville, Tennessee – recording location
- The Carport, Nashville, Tennessee – recording location
- El Dorado Recording Studios, Hollywood, California – recording location
- Steve's Studio, Stillwater, Oklahoma – recording location
- Walls Have Ears Studio, Milwaukee, Wisconsin – recording location
- Sixteenth Ave. Sound, Nashville, Tennessee – mixing location
- South Beach Studios, Miami Beach, Florida – mixing location
- Encore Studios, Burbank, California – mixing location
