= Newsboys discography =

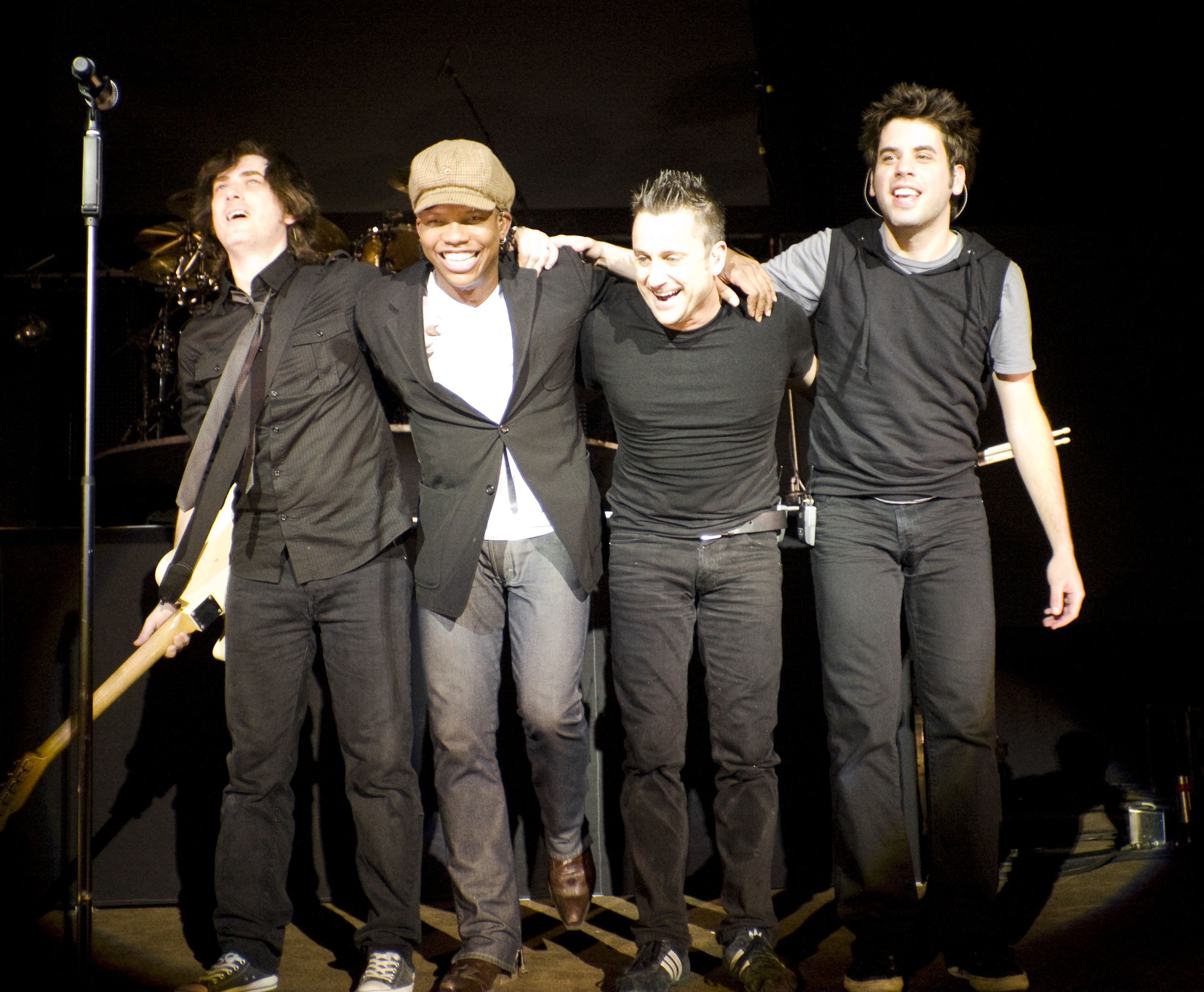
- Newsboys in March 2009; from L. to R. Jody Davis, Michael Tait, Duncan Phillips, and Jeff Frankenstein
- Studio albums: 21
- Extended plays: 10
- Live albums: 2
- Compilation albums: 17
- Singles: 102
- Music videos: 22

The discography of Australian Christian rock band Newsboys consists of 21 studio albums, two remix albums, 17 compilations, two live albums, a demo, 102 singles, 10 extended plays, 22 music videos, and some official live recordings.

== Albums ==
=== Studio albums ===
| Title | Album details | Peak chart positions | | | | | | Certifications |
| Title | Album details | US | US Christ. | US Rock | US Alt. | NZ | UK C&G | Certifications |
|---|---|---|---|---|---|---|---|---|
| Read All About It | Released: 1 December 1988; Label: Refuge Records; Format: CD, cassette | — | — | — | — | — | — | |
| Hell Is for Wimps | Released: 31 July 1990; Label: Star Song Communications; Format: CD, cassette | — | — | — | — | — | — | |
| Boys Will Be Boyz | Released: 9 August 1991; Label: Star Song Communications; Format: CD, cassette | — | — | — | — | — | — | |
| Not Ashamed | Released: 29 September 1992; Label: Star Song Communications; Format: CD, cassette, LP | — | 11 | — | — | — | — | |
| Going Public | Released: 26 July 1994; Label: Star Song Communications; Format: CD, cassette | — (Note: Going Public did not enter the Billboard 200, but peaked at No. 21 on the Billboard Heatseekers Albums) | 2 | — | — | — | — | RIAA: Gold |
| Take Me to Your Leader | Released: 20 February 1996; Label: Star Song Communications; Format: CD, cassette, LP | 35 | 1 | — | — | — | — | RIAA: Gold |
| Step Up to the Microphone | Released: 30 June 1998; Label: Star Song Communications; Format: CD, cassette, LP | 61 | 1 | — | — | — | — | RIAA: Gold |
| Love Liberty Disco | Released: 16 November 1999; Label: Sparrow Records; Format: CD | 80 | 5 | — | — | — | — | |
| Thrive | Released: 26 March 2002; Label: Sparrow Records; Format: CD | 38 | 3 | — | — | — | — | |
| Adoration: The Worship Album | Released: 8 April 2003; Label: Sparrow Records; Format: CD | 33 | 1 | — | — | — | — | RIAA: Gold |
| Devotion | Released: 2 November 2004; Label: Sparrow Records; Format: CD | 61 | 5 | — | — | — | — | |
| Go | Released: 31 October 2006; Label: Inpop Records; Format: CD | 51 | 4 | — | — | — | — | |
| In the Hands of God | Released: 5 May 2009; Label: Inpop Records; Format: CD | 28 | 2 | — | — | — | — | |
| Born Again | Released: 13 July 2010; Label: Inpop Records; Format: CD | 4 | 1 | — | — | — | — | |
| God's Not Dead | Released: 15 November 2011; Label: Inpop Records; Format: CD | 45 | 1 | — | — | 22 | — | RIAA: Gold |
| Restart | Released: 10 September 2013; Label: Sparrow Records; Format: CD, digital download | 38 | 1 | — | — | — | 12 | |
| Hallelujah for the Cross | Released: 4 November 2014; Label: Sparrow Records; Format: CD, digital download | 79 | 4 | — | — | — | 15 | |
| Love Riot | Released: 4 March 2016; Label: Fair Trade Services; Format: CD, digital download | 14 | 2 | 1 | 1 | — | — | |
| United (as Newsboys United) | Released: 10 May 2019; Label: Fair Trade Services; Formats: CD, digital download, vinyl | 20 | 1 | — | — | — | — | |
| Stand | Released: 1 October 2021; Label: Capitol CMG; Formats: CD, digital download | — | 6 | — | — | — | — | |
| World Wide Revival (Part 1) | Released: 19 July 2024; Label: Capitol CMG; Formats: CD, digital download | — | 41 | — | — | — | — | |
"—" denotes a recording that did not chart or was not released in that territory.

=== Remix albums ===
| Title | Album details | Peak chart positions | |
| Title | Album details | US Christian | US Dance |
|---|---|---|---|
| Newsboys Remixed | Released: 24 September 2002; Label: Sparrow Records | 21 | — |
| GO Remixed | Released: 8 May 2007; Label: Inpop | 49 | 10 |

=== Compilation albums ===
| Title | Album details | Peak chart positions | | Certifications |
| Title | Album details | US | US Christian | Certifications |
|---|---|---|---|---|
| Shine: The Hits | Released: 24 October 2000; Label: Sparrow Records; Format: CD | 122 | 5 | RIAA: Gold |
| 8 Great Hits | Released: 27 July 2004; Label: Sparrow Records; Format: CD | — | — | |
| The Best of Newsboys: 10 Best Series | Released: 10 August 2004; Label: EMI Music Distribution; Format: CD | — | — | |
| He Reigns: The Worship Collection | Released: 4 October 2005; Label: Sparrow/EMI; Format: CD | — | 35 | |
| The Greatest Hits | Released: 20 November 2007; Label: Sparrow Records; Format: CD | — | 27 | |
| A Collection: 1992–2002 | Released: 20 November 2007; Label: EMI Music Distribution; Format: CD box set | — | — | |
| 2 for 1: Adoration: The Worship Album / Devotion | Released: 29 April 2008; Label: ForeFront Records; Format: CD | — | — | |
| 2 for 1: Thrive / Newsboys Remixed | Released: 2008; Label: Sparrow Records; Format: CD | — | — | |
| The Ultimate Collection | Released: 7 April 2009; Label: Sparrow Records; Format: CD | — | — | |
| 2 for 1: Step Up to the Microphone / Love Liberty Disco | Released: 30 June 2009; Label: Sony CMG/Sparrow Records; Format: CD | — | — | |
| 2 for 1: Go / GO Remixed | Released: 22 June 2010; Label: EMI/Inpop Records; Format: CD | — | — | |
| Discover: 6 Essential Songs | Released: 25 October 2010; Label: Sony CMG/Sparrow Records; Format: CD | — | — | |
| My Newsboys Playlist | Released: 22 March 2011; Label: EMI/Sparrow Records; Format: CD | — | — | |
| Back 2 Back Hits: Adoration / The Greatest Hits | Released: 7 June 2011; Label: EMI/Sony CMG/Sparrow Records; Format: CD | — | — | |
| Icon | Released: 12 March 2013; Label: Capitol Records/Capitol CMG; Format: CD | — | — | |
| 3 Album Collection | Released: 19 August 2014; Label: Sparrow Records; Format: CD | — | — | |
| God's Not Dead: The Greatest Hits of the Newsboys | Released: 12 February 2016; Label: Inpop Records; Format: CD | — | 29 | |
"—" denotes a recording that did not chart or was not released in that territory.

=== Live albums ===
| Title | Album details | Lead vocals | Peak chart positions | |
| Title | Album details | Lead vocals | US | US Christian |
|---|---|---|---|---|
| Houston We Are GO | Released: 30 September 2008; Label: Inpop Records; Format: CD | Peter Furler | — | 14 |
| Live in Concert: God's Not Dead | Released: 23 October 2012; Label: Sparrow Records; Format: CD | Michael Tait | 124 | 25 |
"—" denotes a recording that did not chart or was not released in that territory.

=== Demo albums ===
List of demo albums, with selected information
| Title | Details |
|---|---|
| He's Coming Back | Released: 1987; Label: Independent; Format: Cassette |

== Extended plays ==
- Entertaining Angels (1998)
- It Is You EP (2002)
- 8 Great Hits (2003)
- Go EP (2006)
- Top Five (2006)
- Something Beautiful (2009)
- Born Again Preview EP (2010)
- Discover: 6 Essential Songs (2010)
- Christmas! A Newsboys Holiday (2010) – US Christian peak: No. 11
- Love Riot Preview EP (2016)
- United:Live (EP) (2020)

== Live bootlegs ==
Newsboys hired "Disc Live" to record four shows on their Adoration tour. 2000 copies of each were produced as two disc sets. They were sold after the shows, and on the Disc Live website. The shows were:

- 3.28 Minot, 2004 [Disc Live]
- 3.27 Minneapolis, 2004 [Disc Live]
- 3.26 Chicago, 2004 [Disc Live]
- 3.25 Milwaukee, 2004 [Disc Live]

Newsboys recorded multiple dates on the "Join the Tribe" Tour, which were available for download on the Newsboys website.

== Singles ==
=== 1980s ===
Note: all CCM Magazine' chart information is available in the book Hot Hits CHR 1978-1997 (1997) by Jeffrey Lee Brothers

| Title | Year | Peak chart positions | Album |
| Title | Year | US Christ Rock | Album |
|---|---|---|---|
| "I Got Your Number" | 1988 | 16 | Read All About It |

=== 1990s ===
| Title | Year | Peak Christian chart positions | | | | Album |
| Title | Year | US Christ AC | US Christ Inspo | US Christ CHR | US Christ Rock | Album |
|---|---|---|---|---|---|---|
| "In the End" | 1990 | — | — | — | 5 | Hell Is for Wimps |
| "All I Can See" | 1990 | — | — | 22 | — | Hell Is for Wimps |
| "Ten Thousand Miles" | 1990 | — | — | — | 16 | Hell Is for Wimps |
| "Simple Man" | 1991 | — | — | 13 | — | Hell Is for Wimps |
| "One Heart" | 1991 | — | — | 2 | — | Boys Will Be Boyz |
| "Kingdom Man" | 1991 | — | — | — | 11 | Boys Will Be Boyz |
| "Stay With Me" | 1991 | — | — | 6 | — | Boys Will Be Boyz |
| "Israel" | 1991 | — | — | — | 11 | Boys Will Be Boyz |
| "You and Me" | 1991 | — | — | — | — | Boys Will Be Boyz |
| "Taste and See" (Remix) (Note: Released as a promotional music video only.) | 1991 | — | — | — | — | Boys Will Be Boyz |
| "I'm Not Ashamed" | 1992 | 36 | — | 1 | — | Not Ashamed |
| "Where You Belong"/"Turn Your Eyes Upon Jesus" | 1993 | 10 | — | 9 | — | Not Ashamed |
| "Upon This Rock" | 1993 | — | — | 4 | — | Not Ashamed |
| "Strong Love" | 1993 | 10 | — | — | — | Not Ashamed |
| "I Cannot Get You Out of My System" | 1993 | — | — | — | 16 | Not Ashamed |
| "Dear Shame" | 1993 | — | — | 11 | — | Not Ashamed |
| "Boycott Hell" | 1993 | — | — | — | — | Not Ashamed |
| "Be Still" | 1994 | 14 | 7 | 2 | — | Going Public |
| "Shine" | 1994 | — | — | 1 | — | Going Public |
| "Let It Rain" | 1995 | 21 | — | 7 | — | Going Public |
| "Spirit Thing" | 1995 | — | — | 1 | — | Going Public |
| "Lights Out" | 1995 | — | — | — | 3 | Going Public |
| "Real Good Thing" | 1995 | — | — | 1 | — | Going Public |
| "Truth and Consequences" | 1995 | — | — | 1 | — | Going Public |
| "Going Public" | 1995 | — | — | — | — | Going Public |
| "Reality" | 1995 | 9 | — | 1 | — | Take Me to Your Leader |
| "God Is Not a Secret" | 1996 | — | — | — | 2 | Take Me to Your Leader |
| "Take Me to Your Leader" | 1996 | 37 | — | 1 | — | Take Me to Your Leader |
| "Cup O' Tea" | 1996 | — | — | — | 1 | Take Me to Your Leader |
| "Let It Go" | 1996 | 4 | 21 | 1 | — | Take Me to Your Leader |
| "Lost the Plot" | 1996 | — | — | — | 2 | Take Me to Your Leader |
| "Breakfast" | 1996 | — | — | 4 | — | Take Me to Your Leader |
| "Breathe" | 1997 | — | — | — | 1 | Take Me to Your Leader |
| "Breathe (Benediction)" | 1997 | — | — | 2 | — | Take Me to Your Leader |
| "It's All Who You Know" | 1997 | — | — | 6 | — | Take Me to Your Leader |
| "Shine 2000" (Remix) | 1998 | — | — | 4 | — | Entertaining Angels EP |
| "Not Ashamed" (Remix) | 1998 | — | — | — | — | Entertaining Angels EP |
| "Entertaining Angels" | 1998 | 32 | — | 1 | — | Step Up to the Microphone |
| "Believe" | 1998 | 4 | — | 1 | — | Step Up to the Microphone |
| "Hallelujah" | 1998 | — | — | — | 4 | Step Up to the Microphone |
| "Woo Hoo" | 1998 | — | — | 1 | 20 | Step Up to the Microphone |
| "Step Up to the Microphone" | 1998 | — | — | 1 | — | Step Up to the Microphone |
| "Truth Be Known - Everybody Gets a Shot" (Live) | 1999 | — | — | — | — | Live: One Night in Pennsylvania (video) |
| "Love Liberty Disco" | 1999 | — | — | 5 | — | Love Liberty Disco |

=== 2000s ===
| Title | Year | Peak chart positions | | | Certifications | Album |
| Title | Year | US Christ | US Christ Airplay | US Christ AC | Certifications | Album |
|---|---|---|---|---|---|---|
| "Beautiful Sound" | 2000 | — | — | - | | Love Liberty Disco |
| "I Surrender All" (Note: "Good Stuff"/"I Surrender All" released as a double A-side single with "Good Stuff" geared towards CHR/Rock formats, and "I Surrender All" for AC format.) | 2000 | — | — | — | | Love Liberty Disco |
| "Good Stuff" | 2000 | — | — | — | | Love Liberty Disco |
| "Mega-Mix" | 2000 | — | — | — | | Shine: The Hits |
| "God Is Not a Secret" (featuring TobyMac) | 2000 | — | — | — | | Shine: The Hits |
| "Joy" | 2000 | — | — | — | | Shine: The Hits |
| "Who?" | 2001 | — | — | — | | Shine: The Hits |
| "Praises" | 2001 | — | — | — | | Shine: The Hits |
| "It Is You" | 2002 | — | — | — | | Thrive |
| "Million Pieces (Kissin' Your Cares Goodbye)" | 2002 | — | — | — | | Thrive |
| "John Woo" | 2002 | — | — | — | | Thrive |
| "Live in Stereo" | 2002 | — | — | — | | Thrive |
| "The Fad of the Land" | 2002 | — | — | — | | Thrive |
| "Giving It Over" | 2002 | — | — | — | | Thrive |
| "In the Belly of the Whale" (featuring Steve Taylor) | 2002 | — | — | — | | Jonah: A VeggieTales Movie |
| "He Reigns" | 2003 | 4 | | 6 | RIAA: Gold | Adoration: The Worship Album |
| "You Are My King (Amazing Love)" | 2003 | 1 | | 1 | | Adoration: The Worship Album |
| "In Christ Alone" | 2003 | — | | — | | Adoration: The Worship Album |
| "Adoration" (Note: "Adoration" was possibly not released a radio single, but received enough airplay to chart during the Christmas season.) | 2003 | 34 | | 31 | | Adoration: The Worship Album |
| "Presence (My Heart's Desire)" | 2004 | 4 | | 4 | | Devotion |
| "Devotion" | 2004 | 16 | | 16 | | Devotion |
| "Blessed Be Your Name" (featuring Rebecca St. James) | 2004 | — | | — | | Devotion |
| "Strong Tower" | 2004 | — | | — | | Devotion |
| "Isaiah" (Note: "Isaiah" was originally released as an iTunes Exclusive bonus track for Devotion. The song has since been removed as a bonus track from the album on iTunes and is now available as a single-only release.) | 2005 | — | | — | | non-album single |
| "I Am Free" (Live) | 2006 | 11 | | 11 | | Houston We Are GO (Live) |
| "Wherever We Go" | 2006 | 3 | | 15 | | GO |
| "Something Beautiful" | 2007 | 4 | | 6 | | GO |
| "In Wonder" | 2007 | 4 | | 5 | | GO |
| "Yo Ho Hero" (featuring Steve Taylor) | 2008 | — | | — | | The Pirates Who Don't Do Anything: A VeggieTales Movie |
| "Stay Strong" | 2008 | 19 | | 20 | | The Greatest Hits |
| "In the Hands of God" | 2009 | 3 | | 2 | | In the Hands of God |
| "The Way We Roll" | 2009 | — | | — | | In the Hands of God |
| "Glorious" (Michael Tait version) | 2009 | 15 | | 9 | | In the Hands of God |

=== 2010s ===
| Title | Year | Peak chart positions | | | | | Certifications | Album |
| Title | Year | US Bub. | US Christ. | US Christ. Airplay | US Christ. AC | US Christ. Digital | Certifications | Album |
|---|---|---|---|---|---|---|---|---|
| "I'll Be" | 2010 | — | 32 | | — | 33 | | Born Again EP |
| "Born Again" | 2010 | — | 2 | | 2 | 2 | | Born Again |
| "Way Beyond Myself" | 2010 | — | 25 | | — | — | | Born Again |
| "Miracles"^{[A]} | 2011 | — | — | — | — | — | | Born Again |
| "We Remember" (featuring Israel Houghton) | 2011 | — | 19 | | 22 | — | | Born Again: Miracles Edition |
| "Save Your Life" | 2011 | — | 18 | | 20 | — | | Born Again: Miracles Edition |
| "God's Not Dead (Like a Lion)" (featuring Kevin Max) | 2011 | 15 | 2 | | 1 | 1 | RIAA: 2× Platinum | God's Not Dead |
| "The League of Incredible Vegetables (Theme)" | 2012 | — | — | | — | — | | non-album single |
| "Your Love Never Fails" | 2012 | — | 6 | | 7 | 25 | | God's Not Dead |
| "Jesus Paid It All" | 2013 | — | — | | — | — | | Hallelujah for the Cross |
| "Live With Abandon" | 2013 | — | 9 | | 11 | 8 | | Restart |
| "We Believe" | 2014 | 24 | 2 | 1 | 1 | 2 | RIAA: Gold | Restart |
| "That Home (A Tribute to Moms)" | 2014 | — | 43 | 50 | — | — | | Restart |
| "That's How You Change the World"^{[A]} | 2014 | — | — | — | — | — | | Restart |
| "Hallelujah for the Cross" | 2014 | — | — | — | — | 48 | | Hallelujah for the Cross |
| "His Eye Is on the Sparrow" | 2015 | — | — | — | — | — | | Hallelujah for the Cross |
| "Guilty" | 2015 | — | 12 | 13 | 15 | 6 | | Love Riot |
| "Crazy" | 2016 | — | — (Note: "Crazy" did not enter the Hot Christian Songs chart, but peaked at number 27 on the Christian Hot AC/CHR chart.) | — | — | — | | Love Riot |
| "You Hold It All (Every Mountain)" | 2016 | — | 42 | 31 | 25 | — | | Love Riot |
| "The Cross Has the Final Word" (with Peter Furler) | 2017 | — | 22 | 18 | 17 | — | | United (Deluxe Edition) |
| "Greatness of Our God" (as Newsboys United) | 2019 | — | 10 | 7 | 7 | 20 | | United |
| "Symphony" (as Newsboys United) | 2019 | — | 48 | — | — | — | | United |
| "This I Know" (as Newsboys United) | 2019 | — | — | — | — | — | | United |
| "Only the Son (Yeshua)" (as Newsboys United) | 2019 | — | — | — | — | — | | United |

=== 2020s ===
| Title | Year | Peak chart positions | | | | Album |
| Title | Year | US Christ. | US Christ. Airplay | US Christ. AC | US Christ. Digital | Album |
|---|---|---|---|---|---|---|
| "Love One Another" (as Newsboys United, featuring Kevin Max) | 2020 | — | 46 | — | — | United |
| "Magnetic" | 2021 | 27 | 19 | 27 | — | Stand |
| "The Christmas Song" | 2021 | — | — | — | — | non-album single |
| "Stand" | 2022 | 38 | 26 | 29 | 18 | Stand |
| "Jesus Did" | 2022 | — | — | — | — | Stand (Deluxe) |
| "King of Kings" (featuring Bart Millard) | 2022 | — | — | — | 21 | Stand (Deluxe) |
| "I Speak Jesus." | 2022 | 47 | 26 | — | — | non-album single |
| "He Lives" | 2023 | — | — | — | — | World Wide Revival (Part 1); Original version since withdrawn by UMG |
| "Heaven On Earth" | 2024 | — | 34 | — | — | World Wide Revival (Part 1); Original version since withdrawn by UMG |
| "How Many Times" | 2024 | — | 17 | 28 | — | World Wide Revival (Part 1); Original version since withdrawn by UMG |
| "Worldwide Revival" | 2024 | — | — | — | — | World Wide Revival (Part 1); Original version since withdrawn by UMG |
| "How Many Times (Oh How You Love You)" | 2025 | 37 | — | — | — | World Wide Revival (Deluxe) |
| "Christ and Christ Crucified" (with Lindy Confer) (Note: A blanket ban on Newsboys' music was imposed after the Michael Tait grooming scandal by some radio stations; others allowed the new Agee version to be played, as Universal Music Group only released the Agee version from the edited album.) | 2025 | — | — | — | — | World Wide Revival (Deluxe) |
"—" denotes a recording that did not chart or was not released in that territory.

=== Other charted songs ===
| Year | Single | Album | Christian | Christian Digital | Christian AC | Dance Sales |
|---|---|---|---|---|---|---|
| 2003 | "Thrive" (Is That James Dancing? Mix) (Note: "Thrive" (Is That James Dancing? Mix) charted on the Billboard Dance Singles Sales chart due to its inclusion as the B-side on the Newsboys' "He Reigns" single.) | Newsboys Remixed | — | — | — | 18 |
| 2010 | "Mighty to Save" | Born Again | — | 37 | — | — |
| 2010 | "Mighty to Save" | God's Not Dead | — | 37 | — | — |
| 2010 | "Jingle Bell Rock" | Christmas! A Newsboys Holiday | 15 | — | 9 | — |
| 2010 | "All I Want for Christmas Is You" | Christmas! A Newsboys Holiday | 24 | — | — | — |
| 2010 | "Winter Wonderland" | Christmas! A Newsboys Holiday | 32 | — | 25 | — |
| 2010 | "O Holy Night" | Christmas! A Newsboys Holiday | 47 | — | — | — |
| 2014 | "The King Is Coming" | God's Not Dead | 41 | 26 | — | — |

=== No. 1 singles ===
A listing of the Newsboys' radio No. 1 singles, according to their fact sheet posted on their label's website, Inpop Records as well as CCM Magazine, Radio & Records, and Billboard magazine. While most of the hit singles are always counted towards their overall No. 1 hits tally, the inclusion of "One Heart" is in dispute as being an actual No. 1 (Inpop Records lists it as their first No. 1 single, while CCM lists it as having only peaked at No. 2, making "I'm Not Ashamed" arguably their first No. 1). Also, some tallies of their No. 1 hits only include the more popular current CHR and AC formats, leaving out "Cup O' Tea" and "Breathe", which were No. 1 hits on the Christian Rock chart only, and "Presence (My Heart's Desire)" and "Wherever We Go", which both topped the Christian CHR Recurrent chart after falling below No. 20 after 20 weeks on the Christian CHR chart.

| | Single | Album | Christian | Airplay | Digital | Inspo | AC | AC Ind. | AC Rec. | CHR | CHR Rec. | Rock | Notes |
|---|---|---|---|---|---|---|---|---|---|---|---|---|---|
| 1 | "One Heart" | Boys Will Be Boyz | | | | | | | | ✔ | | | No. 1 on Christian CHR chart |
| 2 | "I'm Not Ashamed" | Not Ashamed | | | | | | | | ✔ | | | No. 1 on Christian CHR chart for 3 weeks |
| 3 | "Shine" | Going Public | | | | | | | | ✔ | | | No. 1 on Christian CHR chart for 6 weeks |
| 4 | "Spirit Thing" | Going Public | | | | | | | | ✔ | | | No. 1 on Christian CHR chart for 2 weeks |
| 5 | "Real Good Thing" | Going Public | | | | | | | | ✔ | | | No. 1 on Christian CHR chart for 1 week |
| 6 | "Truth and Consequences" | Going Public | | | | | | | | ✔ | | | No. 1 on Christian CHR chart for 2 weeks |
| 7 | "Reality" | Take Me to Your Leader | | | | | | | | ✔ | | | No. 1 on Christian CHR chart for 5 weeks |
| 8 | "Take Me to Your Leader" | Take Me to Your Leader | | | | | | | | ✔ | | | No. 1 on Christian CHR chart for 4 weeks |
| 9 | "Cup O' Tea" | Take Me to Your Leader | | | | | | | | | | ✔ | No. 1 on Christian Rock chart for 2 weeks |
| 10 | "Let It Go" | Take Me to Your Leader | | | | | | | | ✔ | | | No. 1 on Christian CHR chart for 2 weeks |
| 11 | "Breathe" | Take Me to Your Leader | | | | | | | | | | ✔ | No. 1 on Christian Rock chart for 2 weeks |
| 12 | "Entertaining Angels" | Step Up to the Microphone | | | | | | | | ✔ | | | No. 1 on Christian CHR chart for 3 weeks |
| 13 | "WooHoo" | Step Up to the Microphone | | | | | | | | ✔ | | | No. 1 on Christian CHR chart for 4 weeks |
| 14 | "Believe" | Step Up to the Microphone | | | | | | | | ✔ | | | No. 1 on Christian CHR chart for 4 weeks |
| 15 | "Step Up to the Microphone" | Step Up to the Microphone | | | | | | | | ✔ | | | No. 1 on Christian CHR chart for 1 week |
| 16 | "Beautiful Sound" | Love Liberty Disco | | | | | | | | ✔ | | | No. 1 on Christian CHR chart for 2 weeks |
| 17 | "Good Stuff" | Love Liberty Disco | | | | | | | | ✔ | | | No. 1 on Christian CHR chart for 1 week |
| 18 | "Joy" | Shine: The Hits | | | | | ✔ | | | ✔ | | | No. 1 on both Christian AC and CHR charts the same week |
| 19 | "Who?" | Shine: The Hits | | | | | | | | ✔ | | | No. 1 on Christian CHR chart for 6 weeks |
| 20 | "It Is You" | Thrive | | | | | ✔ | | | ✔ | | | No. 1 on Christian CHR chart for 9 weeks; No. 1 on Christian POP charts for 6 weeks; No. 1 on Christian AC charts for 4 weeks |
| 21 | "Million Pieces (Kissin' Your Cares Goodbye)" | Thrive | | | | | ✔ | | | ✔ | | | No. 1 on Christian CHR chart for 6 weeks; No. 1 on Christian AC chart for 3 weeks |
| 22 | "He Reigns" | Adoration: The Worship Album | | | | | ✔ | | | ✔ | | | No. 1 CHR "Song of the Year" for both CRW and R&R publications; No. 1 on CHR charts for 10 weeks; No. 1 on AC charts for 8 weeks; No. 1 on every AC & CHR chart in Christian music industry for 2 consecutive weeks; Stayed in the top 20 on Christian AC radio for more than 6 months |
| 23 | "You Are My King (Amazing Love)" | Adoration: The Worship Album | ✔ | | | | ✔ | | ✔ | | | | No. 1 on Billboard Hot Christian Songs chart for 7 weeks; No. 1 on Christian AC chart; No. 1 on Christian AC Recurrent chart |
| 24 | "Presence (My Heart's Desire)" | Devotion | | | | | | | | | ✔ | | No. 1 on Christian CHR Recurrent chart |
| 25 | "Wherever We Go" | GO | | | | | | | | | ✔ | | No. 1 on Christian CHR Recurrent chart |
| 26 | "Something Beautiful" | GO | | | | | | | | ✔ | | | No. 1 on Christian CHR chart; reported as 23rd No. 1 hit |
| 27 | "In the Hands of God" | In the Hands of God | | | | | | ✔ | | | | | No. 1 on Christian AC Indicator chart; reported as 25th No. 1 hit |
| 28 | "Born Again" | Born Again | | | | | ✔ | | | ✔ | | | No. 1 on Christian AC chart; No. 1 on Christian CHR chart for 8 weeks |
| 29 | "Way Beyond Myself" | Born Again | | | | | | | | ✔ | | | No. 1 on Christian CHR chart for 2 weeks |
| 30 | "Save Your Life" | Born Again: Miracles Edition | | | | | | | | ✔ | | | No. 1 on Christian CHR chart for 1 week |
| 31 | "God's Not Dead (Like a Lion)" | God's Not Dead | | | ✔ | | ✔ | | | ✔ | | | No. 1 on Christian AC chart for 1 week; No. 1 on Christian CHR chart for 7 weeks; No. 1 on Christian Digital Songs chart for 3 weeks; reported as 28th No. 1 hit |
| 32 | "Your Love Never Fails" | God's Not Dead | | | | | | | | ✔ | | | No. 1 on Christian CHR chart for 7 weeks |
| 33 | "We Believe" | Restart | | ✔ | | ✔ | ✔ | ✔ | | | ✔ | | No.1 on Christian Airplay chart for 13 weeks; No.1 on Christian AC Indicator chart for 12 weeks; No. 1 on Christian AC chart for 11 weeks; No. 1 on Christian Soft AC chart for 1 week; No. 1 on Christian Hot AC/CHR Recurrent Chart; No. 1 on Christian Soft AC Recurrent Chart; No.1 on Christian AC Indicator Recurrent Chart |
| 34 | "Guilty" | Love Riot | | | | ✔ | | | | | | | No. 1 on Christian Soft AC chart for 1 week; No. 1 on Christian Soft AC Recurrent chart |

== Videography ==
=== Feature-length films ===
| Year | Title | Label/Production Company | Lead Vocals |
|---|---|---|---|
| 1991 | Boys Will Be Boyz (NTSC/VHS) | Star Song Communications | John James |
| 1993 | Not Ashamed: The Video (NTSC/VHS) | Star Song Communications | John James |
| 1996 | Down Under the Big Top (NTSC/VHS) | Star Song Communications | John James |
| 1999 | Live One Night in Pennsylvania (NTSC/VHS) | Sparrow Records | Peter Furler |
| 2000 | Shine: The Hits Live One Night in Pennsylvania (DVD) re-issue of Live One Night in Pennsylvania (1999) | Sparrow Records | Peter Furler |
| 2002 | Thrive: From The Rock 'N' Roll Hall of Fame (DVD) | Sparrow Records | Peter Furler |
| 2008 | Newsboys Live: Houston We Are GO (CD/DVD) (DVD) | inpop Records | Peter Furler |

=== Music videos ===
| Year | Title | View At | Original Album/Movie | Lead Vocals |
|---|---|---|---|---|
| 1990 | "Simple Man" (featuring Howard Finster) | YouTube | Hell Is for Wimps | John James |
| 1991 | "One Heart" (shot at Cain's Ballroom in Tulsa, Oklahoma) | YouTube | Boys Will Be Boyz | John James |
| 1991 | "Kingdom Man" | YouTube | Boys Will Be Boyz | John James |
| 1991 | "Taste and See" (Remix) | YouTube | Boys Will Be Boyz | John James |
| 1992 | "I Cannot Get You Out of My System" | YouTube | Not Ashamed | Peter Furler |
| 1993 | "Turn Your Eyes Upon Jesus (Where You Belong)" | YouTube | Not Ashamed | John James & Peter Furler |
| 1993 | "Dear Shame" | YouTube | Not Ashamed | John James & Peter Furler |
| 1993 | "I'm Not Ashamed" | YouTube | Not Ashamed | Peter Furler |
| 1994 | "Shine" | YouTube | Going Public | Peter Furler |
| 1996 | "Take Me to Your Leader" | YouTube | Take Me to Your Leader | John James, Phil Joel |
| 1998 | "Entertaining Angels" | YouTube | Step Up to the Microphone | Phil Joel, Peter Furler |
| 1999 | "Love Liberty Disco" | YouTube | Love Liberty Disco | Peter Furler |
| 1999 | "Truth Be Known - Everybody Gets a Shot (Live)" | YouTube | Step Up to the Microphone | Peter Furler, Phil Joel, Jody Davis |
| 2002 | "Million Pieces (Kissin' Your Cares Goodbye)" | YouTube | Thrive | Peter Furler |
| 2002 | "In the Belly of the Whale" | YouTube | Jonah: A VeggieTales Movie (Soundtrack) | Peter Furler |
| 2003 | "He Reigns" | YouTube | Adoration: The Worship Album | Peter Furler |
| 2008 | "Something Beautiful" | YouTube | GO | Peter Furler |
| 2010 | "Born Again" | YouTube | Born Again | Michael Tait |
| 2011 | "Miracles" | YouTube | Born Again | Michael Tait |
| 2012 | "God's Not Dead (Like a Lion)" | YouTube | God's Not Dead | Michael Tait |
| 2012 | "The League of Incredible Vegetables" | YouTube | The League of Incredible Vegetables (VeggieTales DVD) | Michael Tait |
| 2013 | "Live with Abandon" | YouTube | Restart | Michael Tait |
| 2014 | "That's How You Change the World" | YouTube | Restart | Michael Tait |
| 2014 | "We Believe" | YouTube | Restart | Michael Tait |
| 2015 | "Guilty" | YouTube | God's Not Dead 2 / Love Riot | Michael Tait |
| 2020 | "Love One Another" | YouTube | United | Michael Tait, Peter Furler and Kevin Max |
| 2021 | "Magnetic" | YouTube | Stand | Michael Tait |
| 2022 | "I Still Believe You're Good" | YouTube | Stand | Michael Tait |
| 2024 | "Heaven on Earth" | YouTube | World Wide Revival (Part 1) | Michael Tait |
| 2024 | "How Many Times" | YouTube | World Wide Revival (Part 1) | Michael Tait |

=== Lyric videos ===
| Year | Title | View At | Original Album |
|---|---|---|---|
| 2011 | "God's Not Dead (Like a Lion)" | YouTube | God's Not Dead |
| 2012 | "The League of Incredible Vegetables (Theme)" | YouTube | The League of Incredible Vegetables (VeggieTales DVD) |
| 2013 | "Your Love Never Fails" | YouTube | God's Not Dead |
| 2013 | "Jesus Paid It All" | YouTube | Hallelujah for the Cross |
| 2013 | "Live with Abandon" | YouTube | Restart |
| 2013 | "Disaster" | YouTube | Restart |
| 2013 | "Fishers of Men" | YouTube | Restart |
| 2013 | "Go Glow" | YouTube | Restart |
| 2013 | "Love Like I Mean It" | YouTube | Restart |
| 2013 | "Restart" | YouTube | Restart |
| 2013 | "That Home" (version 1) | YouTube | Restart |
| 2013 | "We Believe" (version 1) | YouTube | Restart |
| 2014 | "We Believe" (version 2) | YouTube | Restart |
| 2014 | "That Home (A Tribute to Moms)" (version 2) | YouTube | Restart |
| 2014 | "One Word" | YouTube | Restart |
| 2014 | "Hallelujah for the Cross" | YouTube | Hallelujah for the Cross |
| 2017 | "The Cross Has the Final Word" | YouTube | United (Deluxe Edition) |
| 2019 | "Greatness of Our God" | YouTube | United |
| 2019 | "Symphony" | YouTube | United |
| 2019 | "Love One Another" | YouTube | United |
| 2019 | "Beautiful Story" | YouTube | United |
| 2019 | "Only the Son (Yeshua)" | YouTube | United |
| 2021 | "Stand" (version 1) | YouTube | Stand |
| 2021 | "The Christmas Song" | YouTube | non-album single |
| 2022 | "Stand" (version 2) | YouTube | Stand (Deluxe) |
| 2022 | "Mighty to Save" | YouTube | Born Again/God's Not Dead |
| 2022 | "You Are My King (Amazing Love)" | YouTube | Adoration: The Worship Album |
| 2022 | "He Reigns" | YouTube | Adoration: The Worship Album |
| 2022 | "Born Again" | YouTube | Born Again |
| 2022 | "Jesus Did" | YouTube | Stand (Deluxe) |
| 2022 | "King of Kings" | YouTube | Stand (Deluxe) |
| 2022 | "I Speak Jesus" | YouTube | non-album single |
| 2023 | "He Lives" | YouTube | World Wide Revival (Part 1) |
| 2023 | "That's How You Change the World" | YouTube | Restart |
| 2024 | "Heaven on Earth" | YouTube | World Wide Revival (Part 1) |
| 2024 | "Worldwide Revival" | YouTube | World Wide Revival (Part 1) |
| 2024 | "In God We Trust" | YouTube | World Wide Revival (Part 1) |

== Appearances on compilation albums ==
=== Various artists albums ===
| Year | Compilation | Label | Song(s) Included | Original Album Appearance |
|---|---|---|---|---|
| 1991 | Ultimate Rock | 214Records | "In the End" | Hell Is for Wimps |
| 1993 | Romantic Rock Vol. 4 (Germany only) | Pila Music | "Where You Belong/Turn Your Eyes Upon Jesus" | Not Ashamed |
| 1995 | Newsboys: The Going Public Tour (Newsboys, Audio Adrenaline, Tony Vincent) | Star Song Records | "Real Good Thing" | Going Public |
| 1995 | Newsboys: The Going Public Tour (Newsboys, Audio Adrenaline, Tony Vincent) | Star Song Records | "Shine" | Going Public |
| 1995 | Newsboys: The Going Public Tour (Newsboys, Audio Adrenaline, Tony Vincent) | Star Song Records | "Truth and Consequences" | Going Public |
| 1995 | Newsboys: The Going Public Tour (Newsboys, Audio Adrenaline, Tony Vincent) | Star Song Records | "Elle G." | Going Public |
| 1995 | Romantic Rock Vol. 6 (Germany only) | Pila Music | "Let It Rain" | Going Public |
| 1995 | Thru the Roof | Interlinc. | "Truth and Consequences" | Going Public |
| 1995 | Right from Wrong | Interlinc. | "Truth and Consequences" | Going Public |
| 1995 | WOW 1996 | Sparrow Records / EMI | "Shine" | Going Public |
| 1995 | A Little on the CD Side: Volume 15 | Musician Magazine | "Elle G." | Going Public |
| 1996 | Hear & Beyond | Star Song Records | "Reality" | Take Me to Your Leader |
| 1996 | CD Aircheck Vol. 21: Reinvention | FMQB | "Take Me to Your Leader" | Take Me to Your Leader |
| 1996 | Dove Awards Collection: 27th Dove Awards, 1996 | Brentwood Music | "Shine" | Going Public |
| 1996 | More Than Gold: A Christian Music Tribute | Interlinc. | "Shine" | Going Public |
| 1996 | Seltzer | Forefront Records | "God Is Not a Secret" | Take Me to Your Leader |
| 1996 | WOW 1997 | Sparrow Records / EMI | "Take Me to Your Leader" | Take Me to Your Leader |
| 1997 | Pulz: 15 Rock Alternatives (Europe only) | Forefront Records / Alliance Music | "God Is Not a Secret" | Take Me to Your Leader |
| 1997 | WWJD | Forefront Records | "Breathe" | Take Me to Your Leader |
| 1997 | WOW 1998 | Sparrow Records / EMI | "Reality" | Take Me to Your Leader |
| 1997 | High Fidelity Reference-CD No. 25 | High Fidelity Magazine | "Let It Go" | Take Me to Your Leader |
| 1998 | The Simply Xcellent New Music Sampler | EMI / Chordant, Alliance Music | sneak peek: | Entertaining Angels EP |
| 1998 | The Simply Xcellent New Music Sampler | EMI / Chordant, Alliance Music | "Entertaining Angels" | Entertaining Angels EP |
| 1998 | The Simply Xcellent New Music Sampler | EMI / Chordant, Alliance Music | "Shine 2000" | Entertaining Angels EP |
| 1998 | The Simply Xcellent New Music Sampler | EMI / Chordant, Alliance Music | plus a personal message | Entertaining Angels EP |
| 1998 | Seltzer 2 | Forefront Records | "Lost the Plot" | Take Me to Your Leader |
| 1998 | Life on the Edge | Forefront Records | "Entertaining Angels" | Step Up to the Microphone |
| 1998 | Songs 4 Life: Lift Your Spirit | WEA, Time Life | "I'm Not Ashamed" | Not Ashamed |
| 1998 | WOW 1999 | Sparrow Records / EMI | "Entertaining Angels" | Step Up to the Microphone |
| 1999 | See You at the Pole: We Bow Down | unknown | "Tuning In" | Step Up to the Microphone |
| 1999 | See You at the Pole: We Bow Down | unknown | Newsboys spot | (exclusive) |
| 1999 | WOW The 90s | Provident Label Group | "Shine" | Going Public |
| 1999 | Vestal & Friends (Vestal Goodman and Various Artists) | Pamplin Records | "Great Is Thy Faithfulness" (with Vestal Goodman) | (exclusive) |
| 1999 | Power Jams | Forefront Records | "Shine" (Sequential Mix) | remixed version of song from Going Public |
| 1999 | Listen Louder | Sparrow Records | "Hallelujah" (Illumination Remix) | remixed version of song from Step Up to the Microphone |
| 1999 | WOW 2000 | Sparrow Records / EMI | "Love Liberty Disco" | Love Liberty Disco |
| 1999 | SuperSaturday | Unknown | Love Liberty Disco album sneak peek | Love Liberty Disco |
| 2000 | Metamorphosis: Mission Adventures - Youth with a Mission | Unknown | "Everyone's Someone" | Love Liberty Disco |
| 2000 | The Joyriders (Soundtrack) | Gotee Records | "Entertaining Angels" | Step Up to the Microphone |
| 2000 | Pass It On: Leaving a Legacy for a Lifetime | Focus on the Family / Chordant | "I'm Not Ashamed" | Not Ashamed |
| 2000 | 50 Years of the Happy Goodmans (The Happy Goodmans) | Spring House / Spring Hill / Chordant | "I Surrender All" (Live) | live version of song from Love Liberty Disco |
| 2000 | WOW Gold | Brentwood | "I'm Not Ashamed" | Not Ashamed |
| 2000 | Stadium Jam | Pamplin | "Shine" (Live) | live version of song from Going Public |
| 2000 | Stadium Jam | Pamplin | "Entertaining Angels" (Live) | live version of song from Step Up to the Microphone |
| 2000 | WOW Hits 2001 | Sparrow / EMI | "Beautiful Sound" | Love Liberty Disco |
| 2001 | Extreme Days (Soundtrack) | Forefront Records | "Entertaining Angels" | Step Up to the Microphone |
| 2001 | Festival Con Dios | Inpop Records | "God Is Not a Secret" (feat. TobyMac) | Shine: The Hits |
| 2001 | WOW Hits 2002 | Sparrow | "Joy" | Shine: The Hits |
| 2001 | Hear It First: New Music Sampler 2002 | Sparrow | sneak peek at the yet-to-be-released new album from Newsboys | Thrive |
| 2002 | Cross Rhythms Experience 19 (Europe only) | Cross Rhythms | "It Is You" | Thrive |
| 2002 | Gesucht & gefunden (Germany only promo) | Gerth Music | "Cornelius" (sample) | Thrive |
| 2002 | Gesucht & gefunden (Germany only promo) | Gerth Music | "Thrive" (sample) | Thrive |
| 2002 | Cross Rhythms Experience 20 (Europe only) | Cross Rhythms | "Giving It Over" | Thrive |
| 2002 | Sonic Fuel: New Music Sampler | Chordant / Walmart | "Giving It Over" | Thrive |
| 2002 | Turn It Up: Sample the Best in Christian Pop | Chordant / LifeWay | "Rescue" | Thrive |
| 2002 | Jonah: A VeggieTales Movie (Soundtrack) | Big Idea Records / Chordant | "In the Belly of the Whale" | (exclusive) |
| 2002 | WOW Hits 2003 | Chordant | "It Is You" | Thrive |
| 2002 | Hear It First: New Music Sampler 2003 | Sparrow | "Adoration" (Newsboys album sneak peek) | Adoration: The Worship Album |
| 2003 | X 2003 | Chordant | "John Woo" | Thrive |
| 2003 | Festival Con Dios Volume III | Inpop | "Cornelius" | Thrive |
| 2003 | WOW Hits 2004 | EMI | "He Reigns" | Adoration: The Worship Album |
| 2004 | Worship Together: Here I Am to Worship - 25 Worship Favorites | EMI | "You Are My King (Amazing Love)" | Adoration: The Worship Album |
| 2004 | Worship Together: Here I Am to Worship - 25 Worship Favorites | EMI | "It Is You" | Thrive |
| 2004 | Veggie Rocks! | Forefront / EMI | "In the Belly of the Whale" | Jonah: A VeggieTales Movie (Soundtrack) |
| 2004 | Dove Hits 2004 | Word / WBR | "He Reigns" | Adoration: The Worship Album |
| 2004 | WOW Hits 2005 | Sparrow / Chordant | "You Are My King (Amazing Love)" | Adoration: The Worship Album |
| 2005 | Worship Together: Here I Am to Worship 2 - 25 Worship Favorites | EMI | "He Reigns" | Adoration: The Worship Album |
| 2005 | America's Choice 30: The Worship Songs Everyone Is Singing | Cool Springs | "He Reigns" | Adoration: The Worship Album |
| 2005 | Worship Together Platinum (CD/DVD) | EMI / Time Life | "It Is You" | Thrive |
| 2005 | Worship Together Platinum (CD/DVD) | EMI / Time Life | "He Reigns" (video) | Adoration: The Worship Album |
| 2005 | WOW#1s | Provident / EMI | "He Reigns" | Adoration: The Worship Album |
| 2005 | Building One World: The XX. World Youth Day Compilation (Germany only) | J-Star | "God of Nations" | Devotion |
| 2005 | WOW Hits 2006 | Sparrow / Chordant | "Presence (My Heart's Desire)" | Devotion |
| 2006 | Smash-Ups | Sparrow | "Colored People/Entertaining Angels" mash-up of "Entertaining Angels" with dc Talk's "Colored People" | (exclusive) |
| 2006 | Smash-Ups | Sparrow | "Shine/Tonight" mash-up | (exclusive) |
| 2006 | WOW Worship Aqua | Provident | "He Reigns" | Adoration: The Worship Album |
| 2006 | The Ultimate Collection: Worship | Sparrow | "He Reigns" | Adoration: The Worship Album |
| 2006 | The Ultimate Collection: Worship | Sparrow | "You Are My King (Amazing Love)" | Adoration: The Worship Album |
| 2006 | I Am Free: Worship Collection | Inpop | "I Am Free" (Studio Version) | GO |
| 2006 | WOW Hits 2007 | Sparrow / Chordant | "I Am Free" (Studio Version) | GO |
| 2006 | X 2007 | BEC / EMI | "Go" | GO |
| 2006 | iWorship Platinum | Integrity / Sony / Columbia | "I Am Free" (Studio Version) | GO |
| 2007 | WOW Hymns | Word / EMI / Provident | "In Christ Alone" | Adoration: The Worship Album |
| 2007 | The Wonderful Cross | Sparrow | "You Are My King (Amazing Love)" | Adoration: The Worship Album |
| 2007 | WOW Hits 2008 | EMI | "Something Beautiful" | GO |
| 2008 | Everlasting God: 25 Modern Worship Favorites | Sparrow | "You Are My King (Amazing Love)" | Adoration: The Worship Album |
| 2008 | Everlasting God: 25 Modern Worship Favorites | Sparrow | "He Reigns" | Adoration: The Worship Album |
| 2008 | WOW Hits 1 | EMI | "In Wonder" | GO |
| 2008 | WOW Essentials | EMI | "He Reigns" | Adoration: The Worship Album |
| 2009 | Walk & Worship | Star Song | "He Reigns" | Adoration: The Worship Album |
| 2009 | WOW Hits 2010 | Word Entertainment | "In the Hands of God" | In the Hands of God |
| 2010 | WOW Worship: Purple | Word Entertainment | "I Am Free" | GO |
| 2010 | Boomin' | Star Song | "Shine" (Remix) | Shine: The Hits |
| 2010 | Christian Music's Best Pop | Star Song | "Something Beautiful" | GO |
| 2010 | Christian Music's Best Worship | Star Song | "Blessed Be Your Name" | Devotion |
| 2010 | WOW Hits 2011 | Word Entertainment | "Born Again" | Born Again |
| 2011 | From the Inside Out | Sparrow | "In Christ Alone" | Adoration: The Worship Album |
| 2011 | From the Inside Out | Sparrow | "Blessed Be Your Name" | Devotion |
| 2011 | WOW Christmas | Word Entertainment | "Jingle Bell Rock" | Christmas! A Newsboys Holiday |
| 2011 | Christian Workout Playlist | Star Song | "I Am Free" | GO |
| 2012 | Seasons of Joy | Star Song | "Joy" | Shine: The Hits |
| 2012 | Mighty to Save | Star Song | "In Christ Alone" | Adoration: The Worship Album |
| 2012 | WOW Hits 2013 | EMI | "God's Not Dead (Like a Lion)" | God's Not Dead |
| 2013 | Jesus, Firm Foundation: Hymns of Worship | Provident Label Group | "Jesus Paid It All" | Hallelujah for the Cross |
| 2013 | WOW Hits 2014 | EMI | "Live with Abandon" | Restart |
| 2013 | My Hope: Songs Inspired by the Message and Mission of Billy Graham | Capitol | "We Believe" | Restart |
| 2013 | WOW Christmas (2013) | EMI | "All I Want for Christmas Is You" | Christmas! A Newsboys Holiday |
| 2014 | God's Not Dead: The Motion Picture Soundtrack | Inpop | "God's Not Dead (Like a Lion)" (Movie Version) | God's Not Dead |
| 2014 | God's Not Dead: The Motion Picture Soundtrack | Inpop | "The King Is Coming" | God's Not Dead |
| 2014 | WOW Hits 2015 | EMI | "We Believe" | Restart |
| 2016 | God's Not Dead 2: Motion Picture Soundtrack | Fair Trade Services | "God's Not Dead (Like A Lion)" | God's Not Dead |
| 2016 | God's Not Dead 2: Motion Picture Soundtrack | Fair Trade Services | "Guilty" | Love Riot |
| 2016 | WOW Hits 2017 | Capitol CMG | "Guilty" | Love Riot |

=== Newsboys compilation albums ===
| Song | Original album | Year | Shine: The Hits | 8 Great Hits | The Best of Newsboys: 10 Best Series | He Reigns: The Worship Collection | Top Five | The Greatest Hits | The Ultimate Collection | Discover: 6 Essential Songs | My Newsboys Playlist | Back 2 Back Hits | 10 Great Songs | Icon | God's Not Dead | Total |
|---|---|---|---|---|---|---|---|---|---|---|---|---|---|---|---|---|
| "I Got Your Number" | Read All About It | 1988 | ✔ | | | | | | | | | | | | | 1 |
| "I'm Not Ashamed" | Not Ashamed | 1992 | ✔ | ✔ | | | | ✔ | ✔ | | ✔ | | ✔ | ✔ | | 7 |
| "Where You Belong/Turn Your Eyes Upon Jesus" | Not Ashamed | 1992 | ✔ | | | | | | | | | | | | | 1 |
| "I Cannot Get You Out of My System" | Not Ashamed | 1992 | | | ✔ | | | | | | | | | | | 1 |
| "Strong Love" | Not Ashamed | 1992 | | | ✔ | | | | | | | | | | | 1 |
| "Shine" | Going Public | 1994 | ✔ | ✔ | ✔ | | ✔ | ✔ | ✔ | ✔ | ✔ | ✔ | ✔ | ✔ | | 11 |
| "Spirit Thing" | Going Public | 1994 | ✔ | | | | | ✔ | ✔ | | | | | | | 3 |
| "Real Good Thing" | Going Public | 1994 | | | ✔ | | | ✔ | | | | | | | | 2 |
| "Take Me to Your Leader" | Take Me to Your Leader | 1996 | ✔ | ✔ | | | | ✔ | ✔ | | | | ✔ | ✔ | | 6 |
| "Reality" | Take Me to Your Leader | 1996 | ✔ | ✔ | | | | ✔ | | | | | | | | 3 |
| "Breakfast" | Take Me to Your Leader | 1996 | ✔ | ✔ | ✔ | | | ✔ | ✔ | ✔ | ✔ | ✔ | ✔ | ✔ | | 10 |
| "God Is Not a Secret" | Take Me to Your Leader | 1996 | ✔ | | | | | | | | | | | | | 1 |
| "Let It Go" | Take Me to Your Leader | 1996 | | | ✔ | | | | | | | | | | | 1 |
| "Entertaining Angels" | Step Up to the Microphone | 1998 | ✔ | ✔ | | | | ✔ | ✔ | ✔ | ✔ | ✔ | | ✔ | | 8 |
| "WooHoo" | Step Up to the Microphone | 1998 | ✔ | | | | | | ✔ | | | | | | | 2 |
| "Step Up to the Microphone" | Step Up to the Microphone | 1998 | ✔ | ✔ | | | | | ✔ | | | | ✔ | | | 4 |
| "Believe" | Step Up to the Microphone | 1998 | ✔ | | | | | | | | | | | | | 1 |
| "Always" | Step Up to the Microphone | 1998 | | | ✔ | | | | | | | | | | | 1 |
| "Beautiful Sound" | Love Liberty Disco | 1999 | | | ✔ | ✔ | | | ✔ | | | | ✔ | ✔ | | 5 |
| "Good Stuff" | Love Liberty Disco | 1999 | | | ✔ | | | | | | | | | | | 1 |
| "Fall on You" | Love Liberty Disco | 1999 | | | ✔ | | | | | | | | | | | 1 |
| "Love Liberty Disco" | Love Liberty Disco | 1999 | | | | | | | ✔ | | | | | | | 1 |
| "Joy" | Shine: The Hits | 2000 | ✔ | ✔ | | | | ✔ | ✔ | | ✔ | ✔ | | ✔ | | 7 |
| "Praises" | Shine: The Hits | 2000 | ✔ | | | | | | | | | | | | | 1 |
| "Who?" | Shine: The Hits | 2000 | ✔ | | | | | | ✔ | | | | | | | 2 |
| "Mega-Mix" | Shine: The Hits | 2000 | ✔ | | | | | | | | | | | | | 1 |
| "It Is You" | Thrive | 2002 | | | | ✔ | | ✔ | ✔ | ✔ | ✔ | ✔ | | ✔ | | 7 |
| "Lord (I Don't Know)" | Thrive | 2002 | | | | ✔ | | | | | | | | ✔ | | 2 |
| "Million Pieces (Kissin' Your Cares Goodbye)" | Thrive | 2002 | | | | | ✔ | ✔ | ✔ | | ✔ | ✔ | | ✔ | | 6 |
| "In the Belly of the Whale" | Jonah: A VeggieTales Movie | 2002 | | | | | | ✔ | ✔ | | | | ✔ | | | 3 |
| "He Reigns" | Adoration: The Worship Album | 2003 | | | | ✔ | ✔ | ✔ | ✔ | ✔ | ✔ | ✔ | | ✔ | | 8 |
| "You Are My King (Amazing Love)" | Adoration: The Worship Album | 2003 | | | | ✔ | ✔ | ✔ | ✔ | ✔ | ✔ | ✔ | ✔ | | | 8 |
| "In Christ Alone" | Adoration: The Worship Album | 2003 | | | | ✔ | ✔ | | ✔ | | ✔ | ✔ | ✔ | | | 6 |
| "Adoration" | Adoration: The Worship Album | 2003 | | | | | | | | | | ✔ | | | | 1 |
| "Great Is Your Faithfulness" | Adoration: The Worship Album | 2003 | | | | | | | | | | ✔ | | | | 1 |
| "Presence (My Heart's Desire)" | Devotion | 2004 | | | | ✔ | | | | | | | | | | 1 |
| "Devotion" | Devotion | 2004 | | | | ✔ | | | ✔ | | ✔ | | | | | 3 |
| "Blessed Be Your Name" | Devotion | 2004 | | | | ✔ | | | ✔ | | ✔ | | ✔ | | | 4 |
| "Strong Tower" | Devotion | 2004 | | | | ✔ | | | | | | | | | | 1 |
| "God of Nations" | Devotion | 2004 | | | | ✔ | | | | | | | | | | 1 |
| "I Am Free" | Go | 2006 | | | | | | | | | | | | | ✔ | 1 |
| "Wherever We Go" | Go | 2006 | | | | | | ✔ | ✔ | | | | | | ✔ | 3 |
| "Something Beautiful" | Go | 2006 | | | | | | ✔ | ✔ | | | ✔ | | | ✔ | 4 |
| "In Wonder" | Go | 2006 | | | | | | | | | | | | | ✔ | 1 |
| "I Fought the La..." | The Greatest Hits | 2007 | | | | | | ✔ | ✔ | | | | | | | 2 |
| "Stay Strong" | The Greatest Hits | 2007 | | | | | | ✔ | ✔ | | | | | | | 2 |
| "In the Hands of God" | In the Hands of God | 2009 | | | | | | | | | | | | | ✔ | 1 |
| "Born Again" | Born Again | 2010 | | | | | | | | | | | | | ✔ | 1 |
| "Mighty to Save" | Born Again | 2010 | | | | | | | | | | | | | ✔ | 1 |
| "Save Your Life" | Born Again: Miracles Edition | 2011 | | | | | | | | | | | | | ✔ | 1 |
| "God's Not Dead (Like a Lion)" | God's Not Dead | 2011 | | | | | | | | | | | | | ✔ | 1 |
| "Your Love Never Fails" | God's Not Dead | 2011 | | | | | | | | | | | | | ✔ | 1 |
| "Revelation Song" | God's Not Dead | 2011 | | | | | | | | | | | | | ✔ | 1 |
| "The King Is Coming" | God's Not Dead | 2011 | | | | | | | | | | | | | ✔ | 1 |

== In popular media ==
=== Video games ===
Newsboys has a total of nine songs featured in the Dance Praise series:

| Song | Album | Game/Expansion Pack |
|---|---|---|
| "Woo Hoo" | Step Up to the Microphone | Dance Praise |
| "It Is You" | Thrive | Modern Worship |
| "You Are My King (Amazing Love)" | Adoration: The Worship Album | Modern Worship |
| "He Reigns" | Adoration: The Worship Album | Contemporary Hits |
| "Something Beautiful" | Go | Contemporary Hits |
| "Wherever We Go" | Go | Top Hits |
| "Your Love Is Better Than Life" | Go | Top Hits |
| "I Am Free" | Go | Dance Praise 2: The ReMix |
| "Devotion" | Devotion | Pop & Rock Hits |
