= Newsboys =

Christian pop rock band

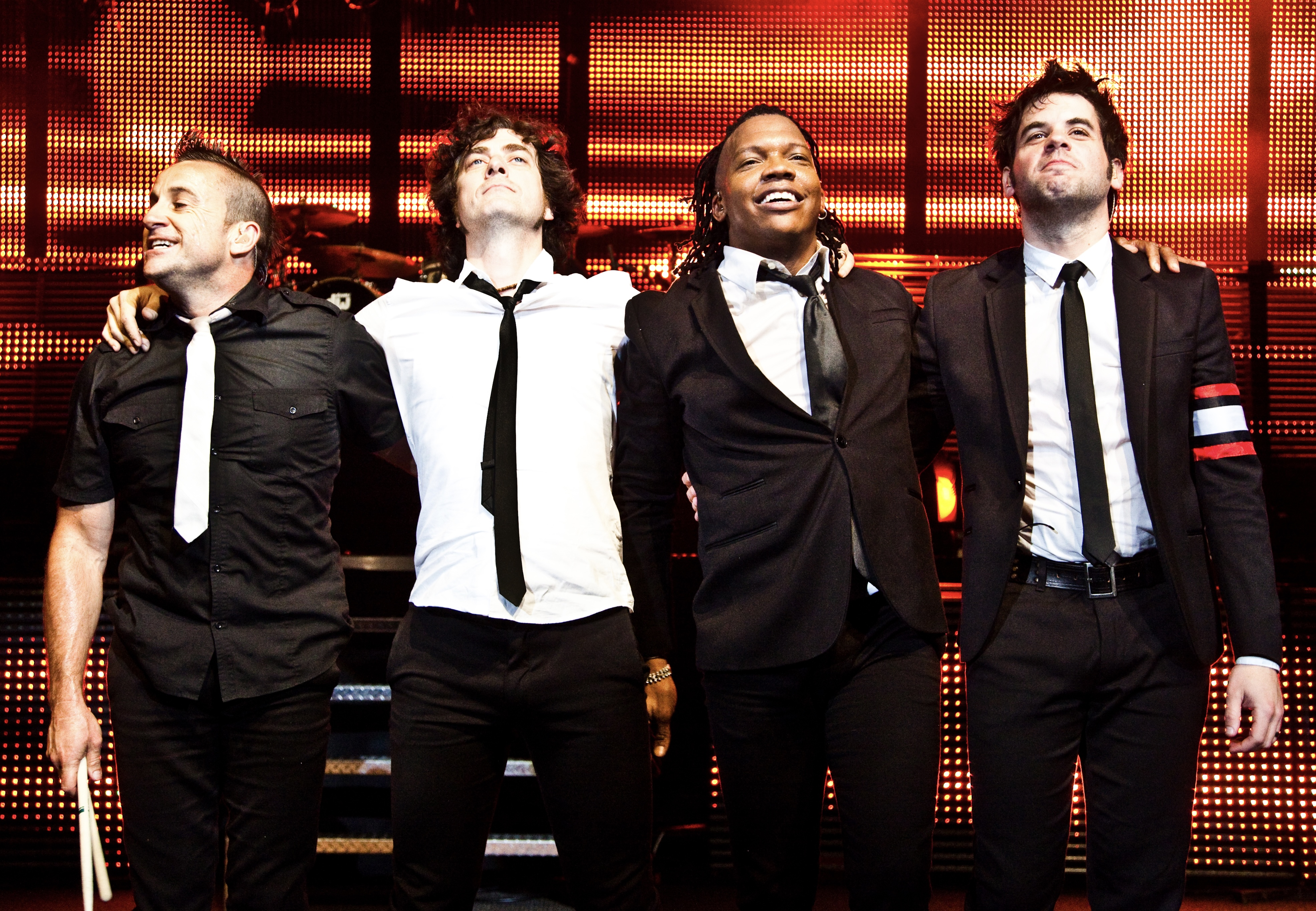
- Newsboys in 2011 (Left to right) Phillips, Davis, Tait, Frankenstein

Background information
- Also known as: Newsboys United (2018–2021)
- Origin: Mooloolaba, Queensland, Australia
- Genres: Christian pop; pop rock; CCM; Christian rock
- Years active: 1985–present
- Labels: Refuge; Star Song; Virgin; Sparrow; Inpop; Fair Trade
- Members: Jody Davis; Duncan Phillips; Jeff Frankenstein; Adam Agee
- Past members: Peter Furler; George Perdikis; Sean Taylor; Phil Yates; John James; Corey Pryor; Jonathan Geange; Vernon Bishop; Kevin Mills; Phil Joel; Bryan Olesen; Paul Colman; Michael Tait
- Website: newsboys.com

Newsboys (sometimes stylised as newsboys) is a Christian rock band originally from Mooloolaba, Queensland, Australia, later based in Nashville, Tennessee. Since its founding in 1985, the band released seventeen albums, six of which have been certified Gold. The band is entirely owned by early manager Wes Campbell and consists of lead vocalist Adam Agee, guitarist Jody Davis, keyboardist Jeff Frankenstein, and drummer Duncan Phillips. Newsboys was cited by CCM Magazine as one of the most influential Christian bands.

In addition to performing music, the band has appeared in the films God's Not Dead, God's Not Dead 2, and God's Not Dead: A Light in Darkness.

In June 2025, reports began to be published of sexual assault allegations made against Michael Tait, followed by a public statement by Tait confirming some of the allegations. As a result, Newsboys were dropped from their record label, removed from many Christian radio stations, and had the majority of their remaining 2025 shows canceled. They have not been active as a band since then, though they have not formally disbanded.

== History ==
=== 1980s ===
The band was formed in Mooloolaba, Queensland, Australia in 1985 by Peter Furler and his school mate George Perdikis. Furler and Perdikis practiced in a garage on the Sunshine Coast. Two additional members were added soon after: Furler's best friend, vocalist, John James, and bassist Sean Taylor. Newsboys came to the United States in late 1987 after getting signed with Refuge Communications and released the album Read All About It in 1988 in the United States.

=== 1990s ===
After signing with Star Song Communications, they released two more albums in 1990 and 1991: Hell Is for Wimps and Boys Will Be Boyz, with its first self-titled video. None of the band's first three albums achieved major commercial success and the band's line-up changed frequently with this period.

It wasn't until their 1992 album, Not Ashamed (containing a cover of the DeGarmo & Key song "Boycott Hell"), that the band gained notice in the Christian music scene with its second self-titled video that followed a year later. Steve Taylor, a singer-songwriter and producer, began a partnership with the band, producing the band's record and writing most of the lyrics for their songs. Furler remained the band's primary songwriter and beginning with this album began sharing lead vocal duties with James and continued to do so until James' departure.

In 1994 amidst continued lineup changes (which included the addition of mainstays Jody Davis and Duncan Phillips), the band released Going Public, their fifth album and first real success. The record proved to be a watershed for the group, winning a 1995 Dove Award for "Rock Album of the Year". It also produced four number 1 hits: "Spirit Thing", "Real Good Thing", "Truth and Consequences", and, most notably, "Shine". "Shine" won the 1995 Dove for "Rock Recorded Song of the Year", and in 2006, CCM Magazine listed "Shine" in the Top 10 in its ranking of the 100 Greatest Songs in Christian music.

The 1996 follow-up album Take Me to Your Leader was recorded with an expanded line up with new additions bassist Phil Joel and keyboardist Jeff Frankenstein. The album produced three more pop number 1 hits: "Reality", "Let It Go", and the title track, two rock number 1 hits: "Cup O' Tea" and "Breathe", as well as fan favourite and concert staple "Breakfast". This album also won the group's third Dove, this time for "Recorded Music Packaging of the Year". This album spawned the Newsboys' first movie, Down Under the Big Top (1996), which was based on the song "Reality".

In late 1997 just after completing the Take Me To Your Leader Tour, lead singer John James announced he would be leaving the band to start a preaching ministry. In 2007 he told UK Christian magazine Cross Rhythms that he had actually been pushed out due to a drug and alcohol addiction. James recalled that at one point, he was drinking at least one carton of alcohol per day, and sometimes took the stage while under the influence. James said that other members likely saw he was spiraling long before he confided in Furler while recording the vocals for Step Up to the Microphone.

With his departure, Furler moved from drums to vocals and auditions were held for the now-vacant drum position. Eventually, Duncan Phillips, who had previously played keyboards and percussion for the band moved over to the drum kit. From 1998 to 2003, the band's line-up of Furler, bassist Phil Joel, guitarist Jody Davis, keyboardist Jeff Frankenstein and Phillips stayed constant and in 1997 Newsboys hit the studio to record their next album.

The first post-James record, Step Up to the Microphone, sold well and produced four number 1 hits: "Entertaining Angels", "WooHoo", "Believe", and the title track. It also spawned the Newsboys' live video, "Live One Night In Pennsylvania" and a year later. "Entertaining Angels" won the 1999 Dove for "Short Form Music Video of the Year". and

The band returned in 1999 with Love Liberty Disco, the band's only album to significantly deviate from their pop rock sound. Instead, this particular album featured more of a disco sound. Still, it produced several hits, including the number 1 hits "Beautiful Sound" and "Good Stuff" as well as the title track. The LLD tour was significantly more popular than the album. This tour featured an inflatable arena, called the Air Dome.

In 1999, Furler co-founded Inpop Records with Wes Campbell as an independent contemporary Christian music record label.

=== 2000s ===
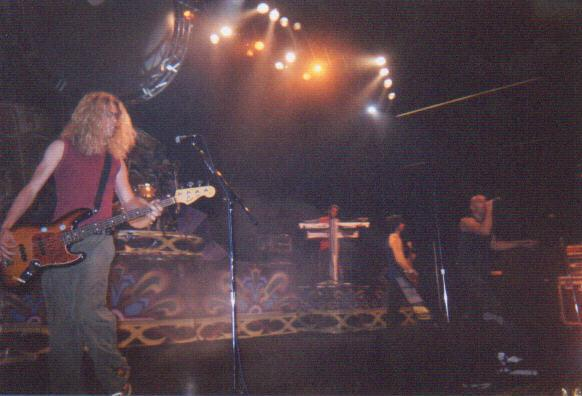
Newsboys at the 2001 National Lutheran Youth Gathering, with Phil Joel in the foreground

In 2000, Newsboys headlined the annual, travelling CCM concert, Festival Con Dios, with Audio Adrenaline and The O.C. Supertones. That same year, Newsboys released a greatest hits compilation, Shine: The Hits, which did not include any songs from the Love Liberty Disco album, but included four new songs, two of which ("Joy" and "Who?") went to number 1. After this album the band did not release any new material until the 2002 release of Thrive, a record that produced two number 1 singles: "Million Pieces (Kissin' Your Cares Goodbye)" and the praise and worship-driven "It Is You", which proved to be the biggest hit of their career up to that point also with its video, Thrive: From The Rock And Roll Hall Of Fame. Also in 2002, The Newsboys recorded the track "In the Belly of the Whale" for the end credits of the 2002 movie Jonah: A VeggieTales Movie.

After the success of "It Is You", the Newsboys then followed with two praise and worship albums: Adoration: The Worship Album in 2003 and Devotion in 2004. Late in 2003, Davis departed and was replaced by Bryan Olesen on guitar. In 2005, The Newsboys co-authored a book of devotions with Jim Laffoon entitled Our Daily Blog which was published by Inspiro and released on 1 November. In 2006, Olesen left the band to focus on his own band Casting Pearls and was replaced by Paul Colman, formerly of Paul Colman Trio.

More radio hits came in 2006 with a live version of "I Am Free" (originally written by Jon Egan of the Desperation Band), and "Wherever We Go". On 31 October 2006, The Newsboys released a pop/rock record entitled GO. GO featured David Eri as a co-writer and the songs "Something Beautiful" and "In Wonder" were big hits on Christian Radio. That December, Joel announced that he would leave the band to pursue his own projects and albums. On 8 May 2007, the band released GO Remixed which was made up of new versions of the songs from GO and featured remixes by Tedd T., Jeff Frankenstein, Max Hsu of Superchick and Lee Bridges.

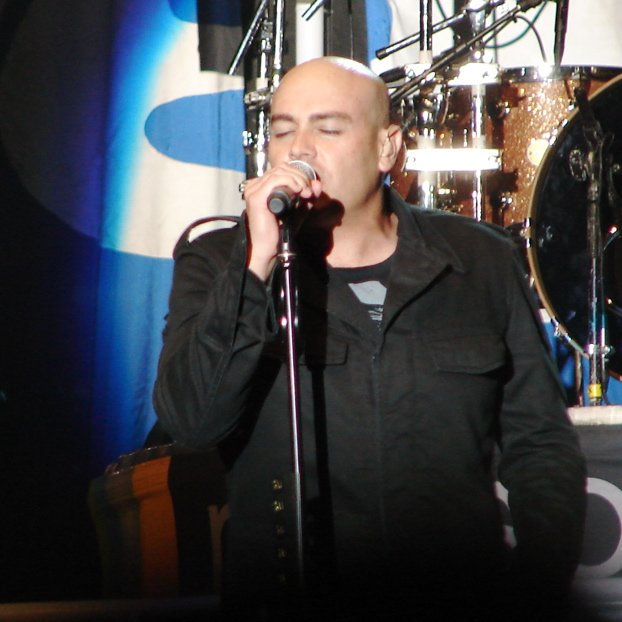
Peter Furler spent 12 years as lead singer of the band

On 20 November 2007 the Newsboys released their second greatest hits compilation, The Greatest Hits. The eighteen-song CD also features two new songs "I Fought the La..." and "Stay Strong". This album was followed by Newsboys Live: Houston We Are GO, a CD/DVD combo recording package of a show from the GO Tour, which was released on 30 September 2008. Also in 2008, the band, with Steve Taylor providing vocals, recorded the song "Yo Ho Hero" for The Pirates Who Don't Do Anything: A VeggieTales Movie. In 2007, the band's co-founder George Perdikis renounced Christianity and declared himself an atheist. He had not been involved with the band for seventeen years, nor was he in any way involved with their commercially and critically successful singles or albums.

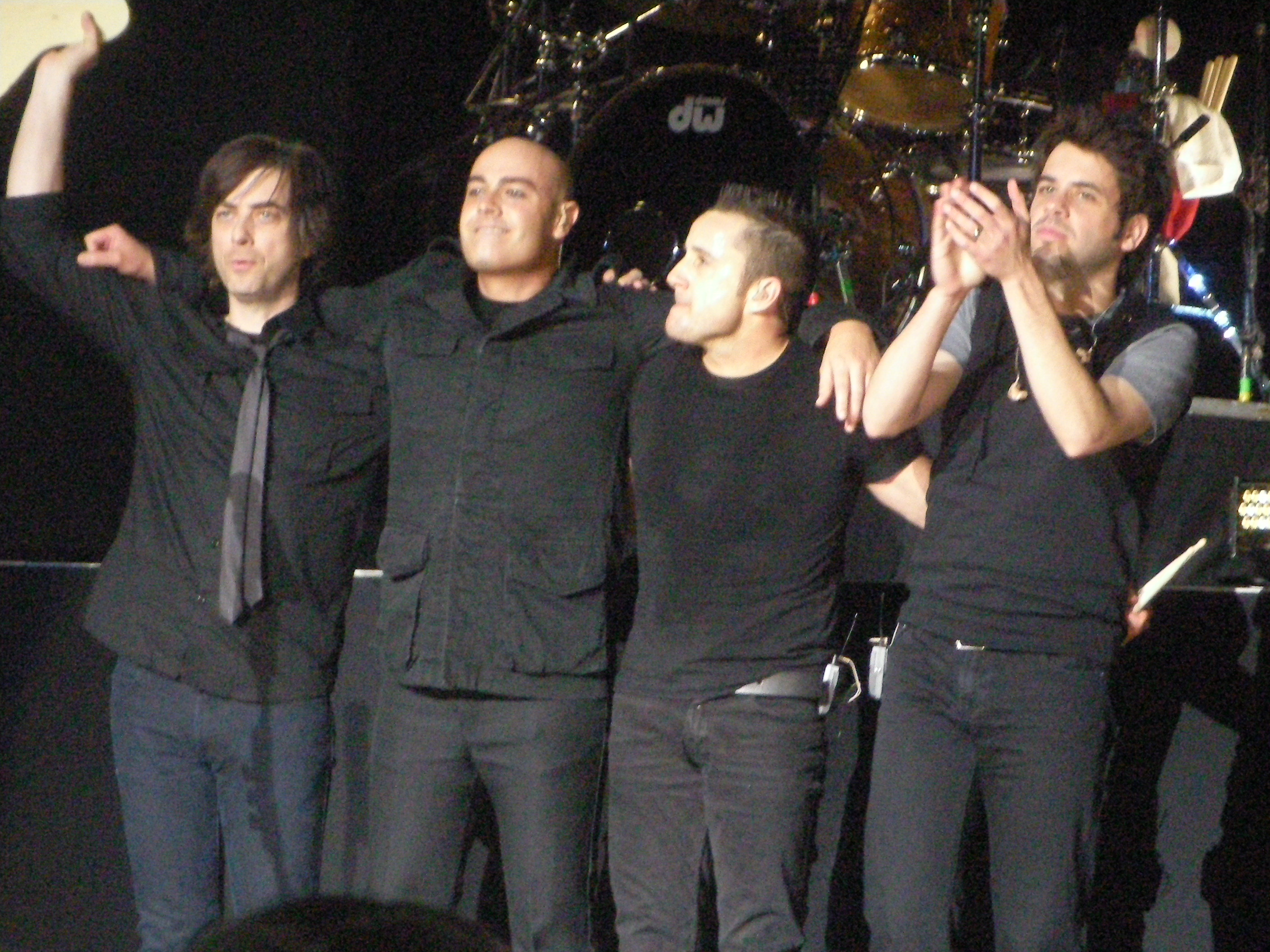
Newsboys in concert, 13 March 2009, with Jody Davis and Peter Furler

On 5 January 2009, Colman announced he would be leaving The Newsboys to return to his solo projects. At the same time, it was announced that Davis would return to the band, after a five-year hiatus. "I am thrilled to be returning to the band and back with my bandmates, who are some of my best friends," says Davis, "this is a big change in my life, and I'm looking forward to the tour and new record with excitement."

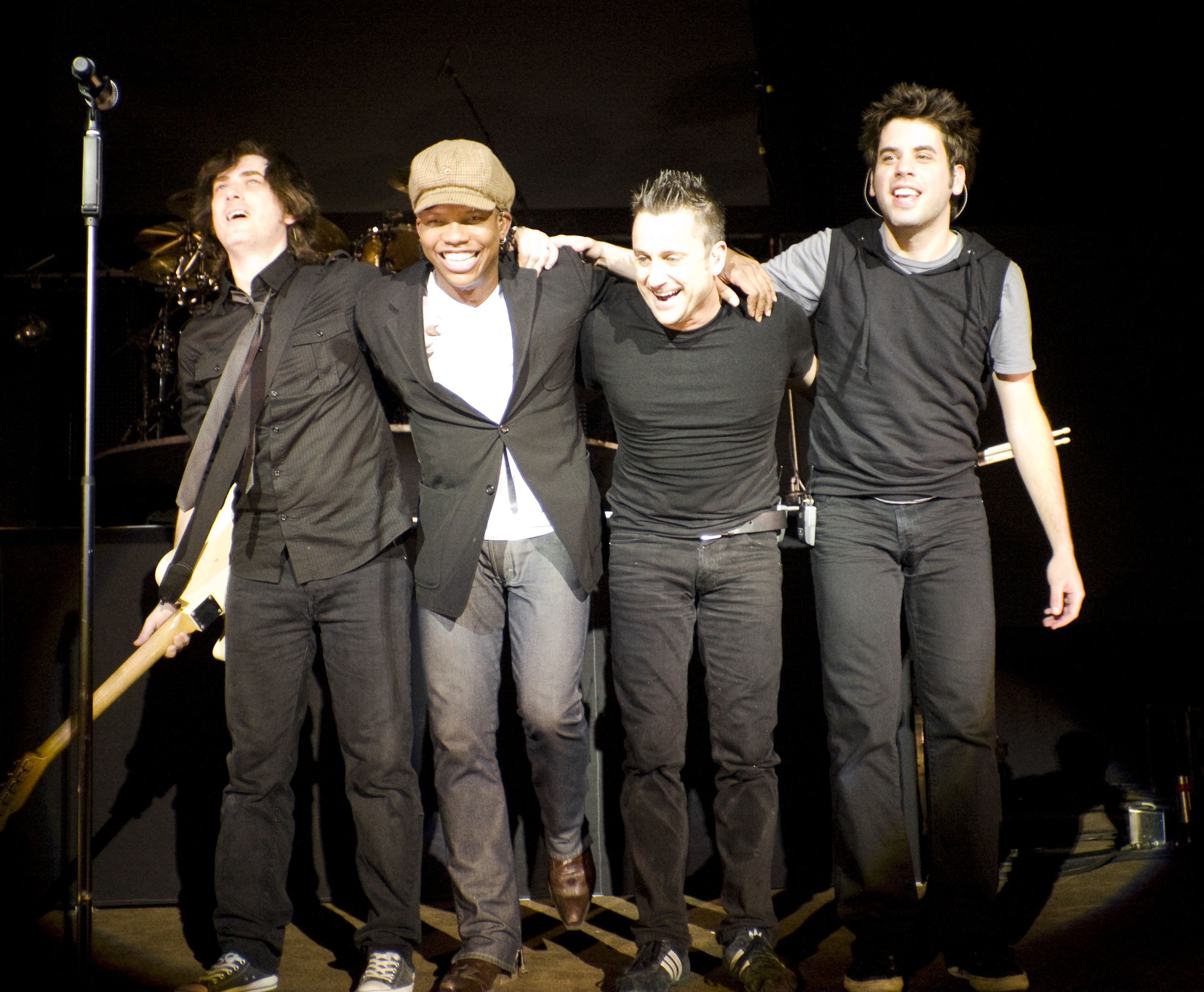
Newsboys with Michael Tait in 2009

In 2009, it was announced that Furler, having toured with The Newsboys since the band's inception, had decided to step back into a support role and would continue as the band's primary songwriter and producer. Because of this, a replacement lead vocalist was required so the band could continue touring. On 9 March 2009, it was announced that Michael Tait, formerly of dc Talk, would be the new lead singer. "Michael Tait will be touring with the band as lead singer with Furler making special appearances throughout the year. Furler will continue with the band and his trademark songwriting and production will remain as he focuses his professional career toward future Newsboys recordings." On 17 March, Tait performed his first full concert as lead singer in Highlands Ranch, Colorado.

The Newsboys released the studio album In the Hands of God on 5 May on Inpop Records with Max Hsu producing the album. Long-time collaborator Steve Taylor co-wrote all the songs and sang on one song. During their concert of 11 September in Orlando, Furler announced that this would be his final guest appearance with the band. His full departure left no original members remaining in the band.

=== 2010s ===
The Newsboys' first studio album featuring lead singer Michael Tait, Born Again, was released on 13 July 2010 and debuted at number 4 on the Billboard 200, their highest debut position, and sold over 45,000 copies in its first week. On 12 October 2010 they released the Christmas album, Christmas! A Newsboys Holiday featuring "The Christmas Song" by Tait. In 2011, the song "City to City" from GO Remixed was featured in the trailer for the Disney Pixar movie, Cars 2.

God's Not Dead was released 15 November 2011. Their newest live album, title Live in Concert: God's Not Dead, came out on 22 October 2012. In the same year they released their single "The League of Incredible Vegetables" for the VeggieTales video of the same name. The band released their 16th studio album Restart on 10 September 2013. The "Restart Tour" ran from 20 September to 27 October 2013. The band is also a part of the Winter Jam Tour 2013 from November 2013 through March 2014.

The band appeared in a sequence for the film God's Not Dead, released in 2014. Michael Tait expressed excitement about the film to The Global Dispatch during an interview, saying that "The movie is powerful because of the whole stance of it…just trying to prove God's existence…sharing the gospel, living the lifestyle, changing the mindset of people around them in this college, in this university." Duncan Phillips added in a similar interview that "Disney's Shane Harper plays a college student whose faith is challenged by his professor, played by Kevin Sorbo from Hercules. Dean Cain from Superman is in it, too. So we got to hang out with a bunch of superheroes. The movie raises a lot of questions and a lot of eyebrows from a culture that questions if there is a God."

The band then embarked on the "We Believe Tour". They performed at the BigChurchDayOut 2014 and again in 2017. In 2015, the Newsboys started the "We Believe God's Not Dead Tour". Love Riot was released in 2016 and a tour followed. The band also appeared in the 2016 film God's Not Dead 2.

It was announced in late 2017 that Peter Furler and Phil Joel would participate with Newsboys on the Newsboys United Tour in 2018. Along with the tour, it was announced that the band is doing an album, United, with Furler and Joel, which was released 10 May 2019. The last tour date with Furler and Joel was in August 2021.

=== 2020s ===
The band subsequently released Stand, their seventh studio album with Tait, on 1 October 2021.

In March 2023, Adam Agee, formerly of Stellar Kart and Audio Adrenaline would be joining the band as the fifth member. "He Lives" as a digital single marking the first single with Agee was released on 31 March 2023.

Newsboys released World Wide Revival Part 1 on July 19, 2024. Its first single, "How Many Times" and its music video were released the same day as well.

On January 16, 2025, Tait released a statement on social media saying he was stepping down as lead singer of Newsboys. Adam Agee, who had joined as guitarist and background vocalist, stepped up to the lead vocalist spot. On March 14, 2025, the band released their first single with Agee as the vocalist, "How Many Times (Oh How You Love Me)".

Worldwide Revival (Deluxe) was released on May 30, 2025. The project had been planned as a two-part release; the deluxe edition closed it out instead, adding four new songs ("Fortress", "New Name" and covers of "Death Was Arrested" and "God of Promises") and new versions of "How Many Times (Oh How You Love Me)" and "Christ and Christ Crucified" with vocals by Agee.

In June 2025, it was reported that Tait was alleged to have engaged in non-consensual sexual activity with three different young men in 2004, 2010, and 2014. The remaining members of the band issued a statement saying that while Tait had confessed to "living a double life" as a reason for leaving the band, they were unaware of the allegations made against him prior to the reports. Furthermore, they expressed support to the victims involved and encouraged others to come forth.

Two days later, the band confessed that they heard rumors of Tait's behavior, which he denied when initially confronted about it. Following this development, several Christian radio stations removed the band's music from rotation, with certain levels of rotation bans. Some allowed material recorded before 2009 (when Tait joined the group), and in other cases, new music recorded in 2025 after Agee rerecorded songs to replace Tait, to continue being on rotation. Others (such as K-Love) banned their music outright. Most stations with outright or post-2009 era bans held them responsible for perceived complicity in Tait's actions.

On June 10, Tait released a public statement admitting to the allegations, apologizing to the victims, the band, and everyone else affected by his actions. He stated furthermore that one reason for his abrupt departure was to seek treatment and counseling and vowed to continue pursuing repentance and spiritual healing away from the stage.

On June 22, the Newsboys announced that they had been dropped by their record label, Capitol Christian Music Group, due to the allegations surrounding Tait. A majority of their 2025 tour dates were cancelled, with their last performance being on July 19, 2025 at the Praise in the Pines festival.

On April 28, 2026, Newsboys owner Wes Campbell filed a lawsuit against MercyMe, The Roys Report, its founder Julie Roys, investigative journalist Jessica Morris, and dozens of other defendants. The suit alleges defamation and a coordinated scheme to eliminate another Campbell-owned business called Thriving Children Advocates as a competitor in the Christian music touring industry.

In June 2026, original lead singer John James released new music for the first time since leaving the band. On the revelations around Michael Tait, James said, "I think just as shocked as everyone else. Just as hurt and bewildered. But then the unique perspective for me was like déjà vu because 30 years earlier the bombshell broke and dropped with me," referring to his 1997 exit due to drug and substance abuse and sexual impropriety.

== Band members ==
Current

- Jody Davis – guitars, backing vocals (1992–2003, 2009–present), occasional lead vocals (2025–present)
- Duncan Phillips – drums (1997–present), percussion (1993–present), keyboards (1993–1997)
- Jeff Frankenstein – keyboards, backing vocals (1994–present), synth bass (2007–present)
- Adam Agee – lead vocals (2025–present), bass, guitars (2023–present), backing vocals (2023–2025)

Former

- Peter Furler – lead vocals (1997–2009, 2018–2021 (Note: Credited as a member of Newsboys United)), guitar (1996–2009, 2018–2021), co-lead and backing vocals (1985–1997), drums (1985–2006)
- George Perdikis – guitar (1985–1987)
- Sean Taylor – bass guitar (1986–1992)
- John James – lead vocals (1986–1997)
- Phil Yates – guitar (1987–1990)
- Corey Pryor – keyboards (1989–1990, 1991–1993)
- Jonathan Geange – guitar (1990–1991, 1992)
- Vernon Bishop – guitar (1991–1992)
- Kevin Mills – bass guitar (1992–1994, died 2000)
- Phil Joel – bass guitar, vocals (1994–2006, 2018–2021)
- Bryan Olesen – guitar, backing vocals (2004–2006)
- Paul Colman – guitar, backing vocals (2006–2009)
- Michael Tait – lead vocals (2009–2025)

== Major tours ==
- Boyz Will Be Boyz Tour (1991)
- Nu Skool Jam Tour (1991)
- Going Public Tour (1994-1995) with Steve Taylor and Ian Eskelin
- Take Me To Your Leader Tour (1997)
- Step Up to the Microphone Tour (1999)
- Love Liberty Disco Tour (1999-2000) with Sonicflood and Beanbag
- Festival Con Dios (2001)
- Winter Jam (2002) with Michelle Tumes, Paige, Brother's Keeper, Phat Chance, Freddie Colloca, NewSong
- Thrive It's All In World Tour (2002)
- The Adoration Tour (2002-2005)
- Winter Jam (2006) with ZOEgirl, TobyMac, Hawk Nelson, Krystal Meyers, NewSong
- The GO Tour (2007-2008) with Kutless and Stellar Kart
- The Way We Roll Tour (2009)
- Join the Tribe Tour (2009)
- Winter Jam (2010) with Third Day, Tenth Avenue North, Fireflight, NewSong
- A Very Merry Christmas Tour (2010)
- Winter Jam (2011) with David Crowder Band, Kutless, Red, Francesca Battistelli, KJ-52, NewSong
- Born Again VIP Experience Tour (2011)
- The Story Music Tour (2011) with Francesca Battistelli, Steven Curtis Chapman, Natalie Grant, Anthem Lights and Selah
- God's Not Dead Tour (2012-2013) with Building 429 (first leg), Britt Nicole (second leg), All Things New and CAMPBELL
- Restart Tour (2013) with For King & Country, Rapture Ruckus, Moriah Peters and CAMPBELL
- Winter Jam (2014) with Lecrae, Tenth Avenue North, Thousand Foot Krutch, Plumb, Colton Dixon, NewSong
- “The Reason” Christmas Tour (2014) with Nick Hall (speaker) and Moriah Peters
- We Believe God's Not Dead Tour (2015) with Audio Adrenaline, Ryan Stevenson, OBB
- The Rock & Worship Roadshow (2016) with Jeremy Camp, Mandisa, Phil Wickham, Family Force 5, Audio Adrenaline, Danny Gokey, Citizen Way
- Love Riot Tour (2016-2017)
- Jesus Freak Cruise (2017) with TobyMac, DC talk, Kevin Max, Finding Favour, Capital King, Ryan Stevenson, Hollyn
- Big Church Night Out (2017) with Sidewalk Prophets, 7eventh Time Down, Blanca, Derek Minor, Adam Agee
- Newsboys United (2018)
- Winter Jam (2019) with Danny Gokey, Mandisa, NewSong, Rend Collective, Ledger, Hollyn
- United and Surrounded Tour (2019) with Michael W. Smith
- Jesus Freak Cruise (2019) with DC talk, TobyMac, Kevin Max, John Crist, Mandisa, Aaron Cole and Ryan Stevenson
- Greatness of Our God Tour (2019) with Ryan Stevenson, Adam Agee and Kevin Max
- Greatness of Our God Tour (2020) with Mandisa and Adam Agee
- Step Into the Light Tour (2021) with Mandisa, Cade Thompson, We Are Messengers, and Adam Agee
- Stand Together Tour (2022) with Danny Gokey, Mac Powell and Adam Agee
- Stand Together Tour (2022) with Jeremy Rosado, Cochren & Co, and Adam Agee
- Let the Music Speak Tour (2023) with Adam Agee
- Always Only Jesus Tour (2024) with MercyMe and David Leonard
- Worldwide Revival Nights (2024)

== Discography ==
- Read All About It (1988)
- Hell Is for Wimps (1990)
- Boys Will Be Boyz (1991)
- Not Ashamed (1992)
- Going Public (1994)
- Take Me to Your Leader (1996)
- Step Up to the Microphone (1998)
- Love Liberty Disco (1999)
- Thrive (2002)
- Adoration: The Worship Album (2003)
- Devotion (2004)
- Go (2006)
- In the Hands of God (2009)
- Born Again (2010)
- God's Not Dead (2011)
- Restart (2013)
- Hallelujah for the Cross (2014)
- Love Riot (2016)
- United (2019)
- Stand (2021)
- Worldwide Revival Pt.1 (2024)
- Worldwide Revival (Deluxe) (2025)

== Awards and nominations ==
=== Grammy Awards ===
| Year | Award | Category | Result | Ref. |
|---|---|---|---|---|
| 1993 | Not Ashamed | Best Rock or Rap Gospel Album | Nominated | |
| 1995 | Going Public | Best Rock Gospel Album | Nominated | |
| 1997 | Take Me To Your Leader | Best Rock Gospel Album | Nominated | |
| 2004 | Adoration: The Worship Album | Best Pop/Contemporary Gospel Album | Nominated | |

=== Dove Awards ===
| Year | Nominee / work | Award | Result |
|---|---|---|---|
| 1993 | "I Cannot Get You Out of My System" | Short Form Music Video of the Year | Nominated |
1994
| 1994 | Going Public | Rock Album of the Year | Won |
| 1994 | n/a | Group of the Year | Nominated |
| 1994 | "Shine" | Rock Recorded Song of the Year | Won |
| 1994 | "Shine" | Short Form Music Video of the Year | Nominated |
| 1996 | "Shine" | Song of the Year | Nominated |
1997
| 1997 | Take Me To Your Leader | Rock Album of the Year | Nominated |
| 1997 | Take Me To Your Leader | Recorded Music Packaging of the Year | Won |
| 1997 | "Take Me to Your Leader" | Short Form Music Video of the Year | Nominated |
| 1997 | "God Is Not a Secret" | Rock Recorded Song of the Year | Nominated |
1999
| 1999 | "Entertaining Angels" | Song of the Year | Nominated |
| 1999 | "Entertaining Angels" | Group of the Year | Nominated |
| 1999 | "Entertaining Angels" | Short Form Music Video of the Year | Won |
| 2000 | One Night in Pennsylvania | Long Form Music Video of the Year | Nominated |
| 2001 | "Love Liberty Disco" | Short Form Music Video of the Year | Nominated |
| 2001 | City on a Hill: Songs of Worship and Praise | Special Event Album of the Year | Nominated |
| 2003 | Thrive: Live from the Rock and Roll Hall of Fame | Long Form Music Video of the Year | Nominated |
2004
| 2004 | "He Reigns" | Worship Song of the Year | Nominated |
| 2004 | "He Reigns" | Song of the Year | Nominated |
| 2004 | Adoration: The Worship Album | Praise & Worship Album of the Year | Nominated |
| 2004 | n/a | Group of the Year | Nominated |
| 2005 | Devotion | Praise & Worship Album of the Year | Nominated |
| 2008 | Go: Remixed | Pop/Contemporary Album of the Year | Nominated |
2012
| 2012 | "Born Again" | Rock Song of the Year | Nominated |
| 2012 | "Miracles" | Short Form Music Video of the Year | Nominated |
| 2013 | Jesus, Firm Foundation: Hymns of Worship | Special Event Album of the Year | Nominated |
2015
| 2015 | "We Believe" | Pop/Contemporary Song of the Year | Nominated |
| 2015 | "We Believe" | Song of the Year | Nominated |
| 2016 | Love Riot | Pop/Contemporary Album of the Year | Nominated |
| 2016 | "We Believe" | Worship Song of the Year | Nominated |

=== Billboard Music Video Awards ===
- 1999 Award for Best CCM Video
  - "Entertaining Angels"

=== Intl. Angel Awards ===
- 1995 Award for Video
  - "Shine"
- 1999 Award for Video
  - "Entertaining Angels"

=== Nashville Music Awards ===
- 1999 Award for Favorite CCM Album
  - Step Up to the Microphone
- 2000 Nomination for Contemporary Christian Album of the Year
  - Love Liberty Disco

=== SESAC Awards ===
- 2000 Award for Christian Songwriter of the Year
  - Peter Furler
