= Michael Tait =

American contemporary Christian music artist (born 1966)

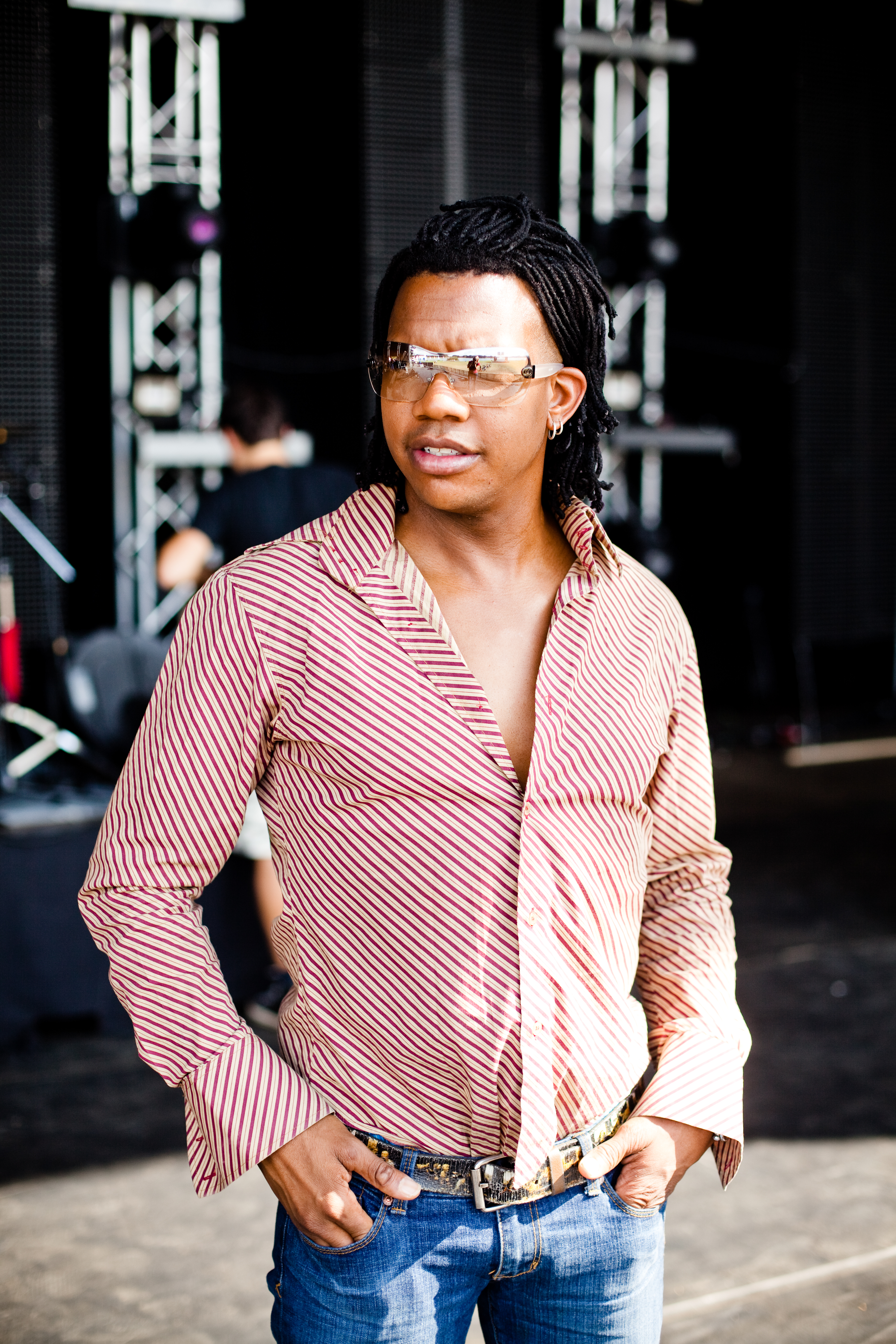
- Tait in 2009

Background information
- Born: Michael DeWayne Tait; May 18, 1966 (age 60); Washington, D.C., U.S.
- Genres: CCM, Christian rock
- Occupations: Singer, songwriter, producer
- Instrument: Vocals
- Years active: 1987–2025
- Formerly of: DC Talk, Tait, Newsboys

Michael DeWayne Tait (born May 18, 1966) is an American singer. He was active in contemporary Christian music from 1987 to early 2025 as a vocalist for DC Talk, Tait, and Newsboys.

Tait, Toby McKeehan, and Kevin Max formed the four-time Grammy-winning music trio DC Talk in 1987. The band released five acclaimed studio albums together before going on hiatus in 2000. Tait also founded a band called Tait. He was the lead singer of Newsboys from 2009 to 2025.

Beginning in June 2025, allegations emerged that Tait had groomed and sexually assaulted a number of men. He subsequently admitted the allegations were "largely true", apologized, and said he was seeking "spiritual healing" away from the public.

== Early life ==
Michael Tait was born in Washington, D.C., on May 18, 1966 to Nathel and Maxine Tait. Tait's father was a pastor. He has three older brothers and five older sisters, and he grew up in Washington, D.C. One of his sisters, Lynda Randle, became a Southern gospel singer.

== Music career ==
=== DC Talk (1987–2000) ===
Tait met Toby McKeehan in 1984 while he was in high school in the Washington, D.C., area, and together they began creating music. Michael Tait and Toby McKeehan both met Kevin Max while attending Liberty University in the mid-1980s. Together, the three formed the four-time Grammy winning music group DC Talk in 1987.

DC Talk's 1990 album, Nu Thang, was certified gold. The group appeared on The Arsenio Hall Show in 1992. In November 1992, DC Talk released their third album, Free at Last, which was eventually certified platinum by the RIAA in 1995. Free at Last stayed at the No. 1 spot on the Billboard CCM sales chart for 34 weeks and was the group's first album to top the Christian Albums chart. On November 12, 1993, the group performed "Jesus Is Just Alright" on The Tonight Show with Jay Leno. Free at Last also garnered the group's first Grammy Award for Best Rock Gospel Album in 1994.

Jesus Freak was released in 1995, reaching No. 16 on the Billboard 200. The album, which was ultimately certified double platinum, was certified gold within 30 days of its release. It also earned DC Talk their second Grammy. The album is regarded as one of the greatest and most important albums to be released in Christian music. It yielded the hit songs "Jesus Freak" (1995) and "Between You and Me" (1996), the latter of which reached the Billboard Hot 100.

Supernatural, released in 1998, debuted at No. 4 on the Billboard 200 charts, an unprecedented feat for a Christian rock album. Supernatural abandoned the hip-hop/rap style found on the group's earlier releases and moved to a pop/rock sound.

In 2000, DC Talk announced a hiatus with the release of Intermission: the Greatest Hits while all three members devoted themselves to solo projects. The three have recorded four songs together since the announcement of the hiatus: "Let's Roll" following the September 11, 2001 attacks, the remix of "Atmosphere" on TobyMac's 2004 album Welcome to Diverse City, a cover of the Prince song "The Cross" on Kevin Max's 2007 album The Blood, and "Love Feels Like" on TobyMac's 2015 album This Is Not a Test.

=== Tait ===
After DC Talk's hiatus was announced, Tait dedicated more time to his band Tait (which he named after his father, Nathel). The band released two albums: Empty and the Dove Award-winning Lose This Life (2003).

The band toured on and off from 2004 to 2006.

=== Newsboys (2009–2025) ===
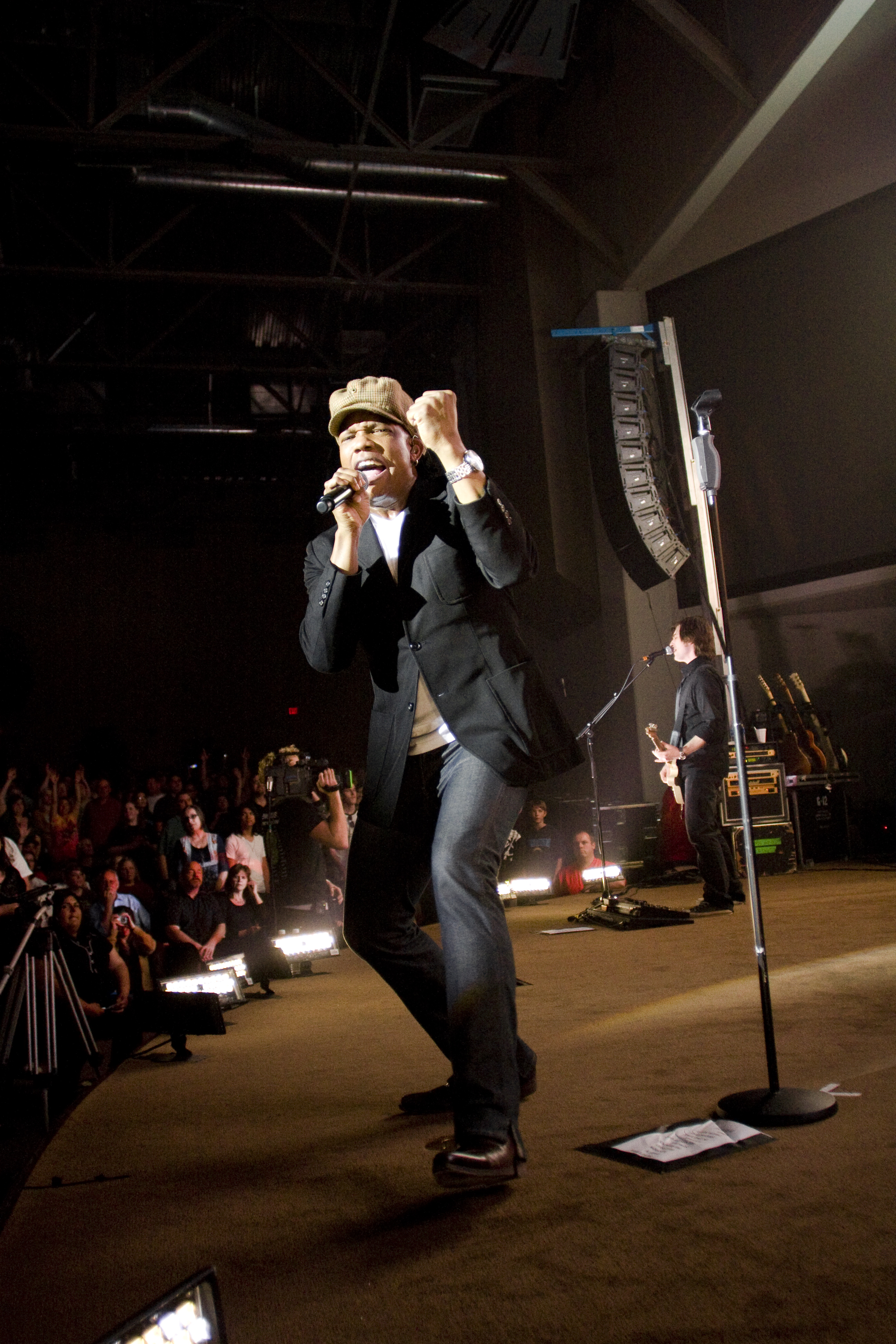
Tait performing a concert with Newsboys in Toronto on April 6, 2009

In March 2009, Tait surprised the crowd at a Newsboys concert by performing as the band's lead singer. On March 9, 2009, Newsboys announced that Tait was their new lead singer. Former Newsboys lead singer Peter Furler still provided lead vocals on the 2009 album In the Hands of God, though Tait and Jamie Rowe of Guardian provided supporting vocals.

The first Newsboys studio album with Tait as lead singer, Born Again, was released on 13 July 2010 and debuted at number 4 on the Billboard 200. The album God's Not Dead was released on 15 November 2011. The band released their 16th studio album, Restart, on 10 September 2013.

The band appeared in a sequence for the film God's Not Dead, released in 2014. Tait expressed excitement about the film to The Global Dispatch during an interview, saying that "The movie is powerful because of the whole stance of it…just trying to prove God's existence…sharing the gospel, living the lifestyle, changing the mindset of people around them in this college, in this university."

In 2015, the Newsboys started the "We Believe God's Not Dead Tour". Love Riot was released in 2016 and a tour followed. The band also appeared in the 2016 film God's Not Dead 2.

With Tait as lead singer, Newsboys released the hit singles "Born Again" (2010), "Your Love Never Fails" (2011), "God's Not Dead (Like a Lion)" (2011), "Live With Abandon" (2013), and "We Believe" (2013).

On January 16, 2025, Tait released a statement on social media saying he would be stepping down as lead singer of Newsboys. He was replaced as lead vocalist by Adam Agee. In June 2025, The Guardian reported that the day before Tait left the band, a former colleague had claimed on TikTok that Tait was "secretly gay".

In 2025, The Financial Times called Tait "a kingpin of Christian music", while The Guardian described him as "a Christian music legend".

== Political involvement ==
Tait told Fox News Radio host Todd Starnes in February 2016 that he supported Ted Cruz for president in the 2016 election. Tait signed a letter opposing President Donald Trump's impeachment in December 2019 and also participated in the Evangelicals for Trump rally in January 2020.

== Sexual misconduct and substance abuse scandal ==
On June 4, 2025, Jessica Morris of The Roys Report broke the story that Tait had allegedly groomed and sexually assaulted three different men. The assaults were said to have occurred in 2004, 2010, and 2014, respectively. One of the men said that Tait had offered him cocaine (which he declined) and that Tait was drunk at the time of the assault. Two of the men alleged that Tait assaulted them while they were intoxicated and asleep. All three men were in their twenties at the time of the alleged assaults and stated that they feared they would be blacklisted in the Christian music industry if they spoke about Tait's actions. Morris later penned a July 19, 2025 article that contained allegations of sexual assault by two other men against Tait.

Shortly after the Morris article was published, Newsboys issued a statement stating that they were "'horrified, heartbroken & angry'" about the allegations against Tait. The band added that they had been unaware of the extent of Tait's double life; they expressed support for the alleged victims and encouraged Tait to seek help. A few days later, the band admitted that they had heard rumors of Tait's behavior and confronted him about those rumors, but that he had denied any misconduct. As a result of the allegations against Tait, all music from DC Talk and Newsboys was removed from radio station network K-Love and a number of other radio stations.

Six days later on June 10, 2025, Tait issued a statement on his Instagram page admitting that reports of his "reckless and destructive behavior, including drug and alcohol abuse and sexual activity", were "largely true". Specifically, Tait admitted to having touched "men in an unwanted sensual way" and to two decades of cocaine and alcohol abuse. Tait clarified that while he "might dispute certain details in the accusations" made against him, he did not dispute "the substance of them". Furthermore, he described his behavior as "sin", apologized to those who were affected by his actions, and said that he was pursuing "repentance and spiritual healing". Tait added that he had spent six weeks in a treatment center and had been sober since that time.

On June 13, 2025, nine days after the original story broke, The Guardian reported the results of its own investigation into Tait's conduct. According to The Guardian, three men claimed Tait sexually assaulted them. Two of them said Tait had used cocaine with them before assaulting them, and one said he was 17 at the time of the assault. Four other men claimed that Tait had fondled them or made passes at them. One man alleged that Tait had masturbated in his presence in a restaurant bathroom in 2001 when the man was 13 years of age. The Guardian added that according to unnamed sources, "Tait's alleged drug use and alleged abusive behavior were the 'biggest open secret in Christian music'".

On June 19, 2025, The Roys Report broke the story that a woman had alleged that she was drugged and sexually assaulted by Newsboys lighting technician Matthew Brewer in December 2014. The woman further alleged that Tait had been in the room while the assault occurred; she accused Tait of having drugged her. Video evidence was given to help support the allegations, and the woman filed a police report not long after the alleged assault took place. No charges were filed.

On August 12, 2025, the Brentwood, Tennessee Police Department confirmed that a preliminary investigation into the allegations against Tait had been opened and a search for additional potential victims was underway. In April 2026, the department stated that the allegations against Tait "did not appear to be prosecutable" within its jurisdiction because they fell outside of the statute of limitations.

Also in August 2025, Clare Morgan of The Financial Times wrote that Jessica Morris's investigative reporting on the Tait allegations had "led to a reckoning" for the Christian music industry.

== Discography ==
=== with DC Talk ===
==== Studio albums ====
- DC Talk (1989)
- Nu Thang (1990)
- Free at Last (1992)
- Jesus Freak (1995)
- Supernatural (1998)
- Solo (2001)

=== with Tait ===
- Empty (2001)
- Lose This Life (2003)

=== with Newsboys ===
==== Studio albums ====
- Born Again (2010)
- God's Not Dead (2011)
- Restart (2013)
- Hallelujah for the Cross (2014)
- Love Riot (2016)
- United (2019)
- Stand (2021)
- Worldwide Revival (Pt. 1) (2024)

==== EPs ====
- Christmas! A Newsboys Holiday (2010)

==== Live albums ====
- Live in Concert: God's Not Dead (2012)

Preceded by Peter Furler	Newsboys; Lead Singers; 2009–2025	Succeeded by Adam Agee
