= Restart (Newsboys album) =

Studio album by Newsboys
- Released: 10 September 2013
- Recorded: 2012
- Genres: Contemporary Christian music; EDM; pop rock; Christian rock; R&B
- Length: 39:10
- Label: Sparrow
- Producers: David Garcia; Seth Mosley; Joshua Silverberg; Christopher Stevens

Newsboys chronology
Newsboys Live in Concert: God's Not Dead (2011)	Restart (2013)	Hallelujah for the Cross (2014)

Singles from Restart
- 1. "Live with Abandon" Released: 25 June 2013; 2. "We Believe" Released: 11 February 2014; 3. "That Home (A Tribute to Moms)" Released: 6 May 2014

Restart is the sixteenth studio album by Christian rock band the Newsboys, released on 10 September 2013 by Sparrow Records and produced by David Garcia, Seth Mosley, Joshua Silverberg, and Christopher Stevens.

== Music and lyrics ==
At HM, Sarah Brehm said that "Restart is packed with tracks that compete with the quality of today's current mainstream pop music, and the lyrics are much more positive, encouraging and wholesome than what is on the radio", and that it was "unlike their previous albums as it's packed with electrifying beats rivaling radio pop music." Sarah Fine at New Release Tuesday wrote that this release was different from any of their past albums, yet stated that "The production quality is nearly flawless, and lyrically, working with some of the best songwriters in the industry shows in the quality of the work. While the lyrics take the band to a whole new level, the group's journey into uncharted sonic waters is the real game changer." At Jesus Freak Hideout, Mark Rice added that "It is no great secret that Tait's Boys have been progressively getting more poppy and electronic, but I could never have seen it coming for the Newsboys to venture into the realm of dubstep."

At Indie Vision Music, Jonathan Andre wrote that the release was "Full of powerful lyrics, infectious enthusiasm and pop-dance melodies that are new, fresh and invigorating, the band are able to deliver 16 songs full of intensity, hopefulness, encouragement and powerful truths directly from Scripture." Dave Wood of Louder Than the Music said that "This is the new style of modern worship, taken outside of the four walls of the church, and served up on an accessible plate that a secular-influenced generation will enjoy." At Christian Music Zine, Emily Kjonaas wrote that "The new-era Newsboys have rediscovered and solidified their sound, and you can hear it in Restart." Daniel Edgeman of Christian Music Review wrote that the album was "filled with how great our God and many other aspects of our Father." At Worship Leader, Randy Cross stated that "This isn't just fun music, but lyrics that drive home the purpose that we as Christians embrace", and added that "The musical style of the first four songs is very similar."

== Critical reception ==
Professional ratings
Review scores
Source	Rating
AllMusic	3.5/5 stars
CCM Magazine	3/5 stars
Christian Music Review	5/5 stars
CM Addict	4.5/5 stars
Cross Rhythms	10/10 squares
HM	4/5 stars
Indie Vision Music	4/5 stars
Jesus Freak Hideout	3.5/5 stars
Jesus Freak Hideout	3.5/5 stars
Louder Than the Music	4/5 stars
New Release Tuesday	4.5/5 stars
Worship Leader	4/5 stars

Restart garnered acclaim from music critics. Sarah Brehm felt the release "will be a contender for best pop album of the year in the CCM market." Tony Cummings of Cross Rhythms wrote that "Wherever you look you'll find cleverly conceived, expertly executed and, most important, spiritually uplifting pop music," with the Newsboys "clearly still a brand leader." Roger Gelwicks stated that "Restart is the best the Newsboys have ever sounded" and being "Comfortable in their own shoes and daring enough to stay interesting, the Newsboys are still a force to be reckoned with, and Restart is proof." Mark Rice of Jesus Freak Hideout felt that "There is lots of good to say about this album, a lot of it being simply a full album of original, fully Christ-centered material made by some excellent musicians." At Worship Leader, Randy Cross added that "Restart is a wonderful album from start to finish. It's electronica start only reinforces the more reflective songs that follow and creates a great balance overall." However, Cross noted that "While this beautifully sets up the more acoustic leaning songs, it may feel repetitive to the casual listener."

At New Release Tuesday, Sarah Fine wrote that this was the band "at the top of their game". CM Addict's Julia Kitzing wrote that the band "never looked back and their albums just keep getting better." At Indie Vision Music, Jonathan Andre found this to be "such a powerful and compelling album". Dave Wood at Louder Than the Music wrote that he "really did grow to love it." At Christian Music Zine, Emily Kjonaas rated the album a 3.25-out-of-five, and felt that because "Restart comes at a time where computerized, auto-tuned music seems to be popular among the mainstream industry" the release may become "popular amongst that crowd." However, she noted that "Newsboys fans may not find this record enjoyable, but Tait-led fans will enjoy Restart." On the other hand, Daniel Edgeman at Christian Music Review called this a "stand out album." At CCM Magazine, Matt Conner wrote that "Electronic dance music is here to stay and clearly so are the Newsboys." DeWayne Hamby, reviewing the album for Charisma, called it "a new collection of pop-flavored tracks".

== Commercial performance ==
For the Billboard charting week of 28 September 2013, Restart was the No. 38 most-sold album in the entirety of the United States by the Billboard 200 and it was the No. 1 Top Christian Album as well.

== Track listing ==
No.	Title	Writer(s)	Producer(s)	Length
1.	"That's How You Change the World"	Justin Ebach, Nate Sallie, Sam Tinnesz	Christopher Stevens	3:53
2.	"Restart"	Joshua Silverberg, Michael Tait, Jonathan White, Kipp Williams	Joshua Silverberg	3:35
3.	"Love Like I Mean It"	Ben Glover, Christopher Stevens, Tait	Stevens	2:59
4.	"Live with Abandon"	Silverberg, White, Williams	Silverberg	3:20
5.	"Go Glow"	Deshon Bullock, Silverberg, Williams	Silverberg	3:08
6.	"That Home"	Eric Arjes, Juan Otero	Stevens	3:51
7.	"Disaster"	Ian Eskelin, David Garcia, Glover, Tait	David Garcia	4:06
8.	"Fishers of Men"	Wes Campbell, Eskelin, Garcia, Stevens, Tait	Stevens	3:07
9.	"One Word"	Phillip LaRue, Seth Mosley, Nick De Partee	Seth Mosley	3:19
10.	"Enemy"	Jeremy McCoy, Otero, Tait, Fred Williams	Stevens	3:36
11.	"We Believe"	Richie Fike, Matt Hooper, Travis Ryan	Stevens	4:22
Total length:				39:10

Deluxe edition
No.	Title	Writer(s)	Producer(s)	Length
12.	"Overflow"	Silverberg, Williams, White	Silverberg	3:12
13.	"Man on Fire" (featuring Kevin Max)	Christopher McLeod, Silverberg, Tait, Williams	Silverberg	3:11
14.	"God Is Movin'"	Stevens, Tait, Jason Walker	Stevens	3:14
15.	"The Living Years" (Mike + The Mechanics cover; featuring Kevin Max)	Brian Robertson, Michael Rutherford		4:27
16.	"Stronger" (Hillsong cover)	Ben Fielding, Reuben Morgan	Mosley	3:38
Total length:				56:42

Bonus tracks
No.	Title	Writer(s)	Producer(s)	Length
12.	"God's Not Dead (Like a Lion)" (Live)	Daniel Bashta	Mosley	4:11
Total length:				43:21

== Personnel ==
Newsboys

- Michael Tait – lead vocals
- Jeff Frankenstein – keyboards, backing vocals
- Jody Davis – guitars, backing vocals
- Duncan Phillips – drums, percussion (all tracks), electronic drums

Additional musicians

- Christopher Stevens – keyboards, programming, backing vocals
- Joshua Silverberg – programming, musician
- Matt Stanfield – keyboards, programming
- Justin Ebach – keyboards, programming
- Tim Lauer – keyboards, programming
- Seth Mosley – keyboards, programming, guitars, bass
- David Garcia – programming, instruments
- Cole Walowac – keyboards, programming
- Jonathan White – programming, musician, backing vocals
- Fred Williams – keyboards, programming
- Kipp Williams – programming
- Chris McLeod – musician, backing vocals
- Sean Power – musician
- Pete Stewart – guitars
- Joe Weber – guitars
- Tony Lucido – bass
- Jeremy McCoy – bass
- Mike "X" O'Connor – bass
- Steven Kadar – drums
- World Outreach Church Worship Choir – choir (11)
- Kevin Max – vocals (12, 15)

Production

- Wes Campbell – executive producer, management
- Dave Wagner – executive producer, management
- Christopher Stevens – producer, mixing
- Joshua Silverberg – producer, engineer
- Jonathan White – additional production, engineer
- Seth Mosley – producer, vocal producer, editing
- David Garcia – producer, engineer
- Kipp Williams – additional production, engineer
- Dan Martine – engineer
- Chris McLeod – engineer
- Mike "X" O'Connor – engineer, editing
- Jericho Scroggins – assistant engineer
- Ken Andrews – mixing
- Neal Avron – mixing
- Nathan Dantzler – mixing
- Jack Joseph Puig – mixing
- Dave McNair – mastering
- Steven Taylor – music direction
- Christopher York – A&R
- Ken Johnson – A&R
- Jan Cook – art direction, photography
- Becca Wildsmith – design, artwork
- Kristin Barlowe – photography
- Christin Cook – hair stylist, make-up
- Annie Kearney – wardrobe

== Charts ==
Chart (2013)	Peak position
US Billboard 200	38
US Top Christian Albums (Billboard)	1
