= Hallelujah for the Cross =

Studio album by Newsboys
- Released: 4 November 2014
- Genre: Contemporary Christian music, Christian rock, contemporary worship music
- Length: 36:13
- Label: Capitol Christian Music Group
- Producer: Seth Mosley

Newsboys chronology
Restart (2013)	Hallelujah for the Cross (2014)	Love Riot (2016)

Hallelujah for the Cross marks the seventeenth album from the Newsboys. Capitol Christian Music Group released the project on 4 November 2014. The Newsboys worked with producer Seth Mosley in the creation of this album.

== Reception ==
Professional ratings
Review scores
Source	Rating
365 Days of Inspiring Media	4/5 stars
AllMusic	3.5/5 stars
Christian Music Review	3.5/5
CM Addict	4.5/5 stars
Cross Rhythms	8/10 squares
Jesus Freak Hideout	3.5/5 stars
New Release Tuesday	4/5 stars

Signaling in a 3 1/2-star review by AllMusic, Matt Collar recognizes, "Featuring nine classic hymns, as well as one brand-new song, Hallelujah for the Cross is anything but a traditional hymns album." Alex Caldwell, agrees it is a 3 1/2-star album for Jesus Freak Hideout, responds, "the Newsboys capably and reverently update these classic songs and words for a new generation of worshipers." Adding a half star to her rating compared to the aforementioned, New Release Tuesday's Sarah Fine realizes, "Not only does the band pull off these timeless tracks remarkably well, they manage to infuse their solid signature sound into each and every crevasse." Tony Cummings, indicating in an eight out of ten review for Cross Rhythms, reports, "the Newsboys have done the youthful Church a considerable service in bringing a set of timeless songs to their attention." Awarding the album four stars for 365 Days of Inspiring Media, Nelson Russia writes, "In Hallelujah For The Cross, Newsboys delivers a passionate blend of fresh and uplifting sounds and instrumentations that is distinctive to Newsboys, while keeping true to the truth, wisdom and meaning behind these songs and respecting the melody of these timeless collection of hymns." Julia Kitzing, awarding the album 4 1/2 stars from CM Addict, says, "this album is very well done, and done in such a way that the Newsboys honor the people who wrote the songs long ago, but they also add a Newsboys sound to them." Rating the album a 3.5 out of five for Christian Music Review, April Covington writes, "Hallelujah For the Cross is a great addition to your playlist."

== Track listing ==
No.	Title	Writer(s)	Length
1.	"All Creatures of Our God and King "	Francis of Assisi	3:57
2.	"Where You Belong"/"Turn Your Eyes On Jesus"	Peter Furler, Helen H. Lemmel, Steve Taylor	3:32
3.	"His Eye Is on the Sparrow"	Charles H. Gabriel, Civilla D. Martin	4:16
4.	"Hallelujah for the Cross"	Ross King, Todd Wright	3:44
5.	"It Is Well"	Phillip P. Bliss, Horatio Spafford	4:11
6.	"Jesus Paid It All"	John T. Grape, Elvina Hall	3:29
7.	"I Surrender All"	Judson W. Van DeVenter, Winfield Weeden	3:22
8.	"What a Friend We Have in Jesus"	Charles C. Converse, Joseph M. Scriven	2:58
9.	"Holy, Holy, Holy"	John B. Dykes, Reginald Heber	4:13
10.	"All Hail the Power of Jesus' Name"	Oliver Holden, Edward Perronet, John Rippon	2:34
Total length:			36:13

== Personnel ==
Newsboys

- Michael Tait – lead and backing vocals
- Jody Davis – guitars, backing vocals
- Jeff Frankenstein – keyboards, programming
- Duncan Phillips – drums, percussion

Additional musicians

- Ben Backus – keyboards, programming, guitars, bass, backing vocals
- Seth Mosley – keyboards, programming, guitars, bass, backing vocals, arrangements
- Tim Lauer – keyboards, programming
- Matt Stanfield – keyboards, programming
- Mike Payne – guitars
- Eli Beaird – bass
- Tony Lucido – bass
- Nick Buda – drums
- Ben Phillips – drums
- Nir Z – drums
- Wes Campbell – arrangements
- Dianne Sheets – backing vocals (9)

Production

- Seth Mosley – producer, engineer, engineer, editing
- David Garcia – vocal producer
- Wes Campbell – executive producer
- Dave Wagner – assistant executive producer
- Dave Hagen – engineer, editing
- Buckley Miller – engineer, editing
- Mike "X" O'Connor – engineer, editing
- Jericho Scroggins – engineer, editing
- Sean Moffitt – mixing
- Dave McNair – mastering

== Charts ==
Chart (2014)	Peak position
US Billboard 200	79
US Christian Albums (Billboard)	4
