= United (Newsboys album) =

Studio album by Newsboys
- Released: 10 May 2019
- Genre: Pop; worship
- Length: 37:03
- Label: Fair Trade
- Producer: Peter Furler; Geoff Duncan

Newsboys chronology
Love Riot (2016)	United (2019)	Stand (2022)

Singles from United
- 1. "Greatness of Our God" Released: 28 January 2019; 2. "Symphony" Released: 3 March 2019; 3. "Love One Another" Released: 20 March 2020

United is the nineteenth studio album by the Australian-American Christian rock band Newsboys under the name Newsboys United. The album was released on 10 May 2019 through Fair Trade Services. It marks Peter Furler's return as lead vocalist after In the Hands of God (2009). The album contains writing credits from Colby Wedgeworth, Bryan Fowler, Ethan Hulse, Duncan Sparks, Steve Taylor, Renee Sieff, Seth Mosley, Andrew Holt, Mia Fieldes, and Robert Marvin, while Furler and Geoff Duncan produced. It features one guest appearance from Kevin Max.

The album was supported by the release of three singles, including "Greatness of Our God" and "Symphony" in 2019 and "Love One Another" in 2020. "Greatness of Our God" peaked at number 10 on the Billboard Hot Christian Songs chart, while "Symphony" peaked at number 48. The album itself peaked at number 20 on the Billboard 200 and number 1 on the Top Christian Albums chart.

== Release and promotion ==
The lead single from United, "Greatness of Our God", was released as a single on 28 January 2019. In support of the single's release, the song was promoted by digital music distributors Spotify, Apple Music, and Amazon Music. The following single, "Symphony", was released on 3 March 2019. Alongside the latter's release, it was announced that both tracks would appear on the group's forthcoming album. Shortly following the release of "Symphony", United was announced for upcoming release. The release date was slated, while album copies were made available for pre-order. On 20 March 2020, "Love One Another" was released as the album's third and final single.

== Tour ==
In support of United, Newsboys embarked on the Newsboys United Tour. It featured supporting act Zealand and began in February 2018. The tour has been described as "history-making" and a "landmark" by the Gospel Music Association due to selling out at all of its venues.

== Reception ==
Professional ratings
Review scores
Source	Rating
365 Days of Inspiring Media	4.5/5 stars
Cross Rhythms	9/10 stars
Jesus Freak Hideout	4/5 stars 3/5 stars
Jubilee Cast	3.5/5 stars
Louder Than Music	4/5 stars
Today's Christian Entertainment	4.7/5 stars

=== Critical ===
United received mixed reception from critical audiences. Speaking for 365 Days of Inspiring Media, Jonathan Andre believed that it was "a great album"; he felt that the album contained "a great nostalgia feel", and likened it to Christian music of the 1990s and 2000s. However, Andre was critical that "lyrics can sound cliché", and described the album as "worship overkill". Nonetheless, he rated the album 4.5/5. Tony Cummings of Cross Rhythms also responded positively to United. Cummings wrote that the addition of former Newsboys members was "a brilliant idea". He described the album as the "catchiest pop rock in CCM", and awarded it a score of 9/10. In a 4/5 review for Jesus Freak Hideout, Josh Balogh described it as a "passionate" and "hair-raising" release which "has exceeded probably even the biggest of expectations". However, he felt that it was "hard to overlook" the lineup of more than twenty different co-writers; similar to Andre, Balogh was critical of the album's "lyrical clichés", and described United as "not a perfect album". David Craft and Bert Gangl each wrote follow up reviews for Jesus Freak Hideout, both scoring it 3/5; craft believed the release was "overly manufactured", while Gangl described it as "all-too-generic". In a similar vein, Jubilee Cast's Timothy Yap wrote that United was "over-the-top" and "predictable". He rated it 3.5/5.

Writing for Louder Than Music, Jono Davies thought that the album failed to "stand out". He wrote that the first half of the release was "perfectly set up for Christian radio", while the second half becomes "better" and "more creative". Overall, he rated the album 4/5. Kelly Meade of Today's Christian Entertainment wrote that the album "does not disappoint", praising its ability to "[meld] the sounds of the earlier days of the band and the new". She scored it 4.7/5 and described it as "a must listen". J.J. Francesco of New Release Today described the albums "anthemic worship" sound has created "some of the most singable and powerful worship songs of our generation", although criticizing that "new ground isn't exactly broken". However, Francesco concluded that United is a "landmark release" and that fans with different tastes "will find much to love". Michael Foust of The Alabama Baptist believed the album to be "one of the best-ever Newsboys albums", praising its ability to blend various different musical styles.

=== Commercial ===
United was a commercial success upon release. It debuted on the Billboard 200 chart at number 20 and opened atop the Billboard Top Christian Albums chart in its first charting frame. The album opened with 21,000 first-week sales, comrpised almost entirely of traditional sales. It became the group's seventh leader on the Top Christian Albums chart. United contained two charted songs; "Greatness of Our God" peaked at number 10 on the Billboard Hot Christian Songs chart and number 7 on the Christian Airplay chart, "Symphony", which peaked at number 48 on the former, and "Love One Another", which peaked at number 46 on the Christian Airplay.

=== Accolades ===
Year	Organization	Nominee / work	Category	Result	Ref.
2019	We Love Awards	"Greatness of Our God"	Contemporary Song of the Year	Won	
2020	We Love Awards	"Love One Another" (with Kevin Max)	Music Video of the Year	Nominated	

== Track listing ==
No.	Title	Writer(s)	Length
1.	"Greatness of Our God"	Colby Wedgeworth, Bryan Fowler, Ethan Hulse	3:59
2.	"Symphony"	Colby Wedgeworth, Bryan Fowler, Ethan Hulse	3:40
3.	"Love One Another" (featuring Kevin Max)	Duncan Sparks, Peter Furler, Steve Taylor	2:23
4.	"Never Setting Son"	Renee Sieff, Seth Mosley	3:45
5.	"Beautiful Story"	Andrew Holt, Mia Fieldes, Robert Marvin	3:22
6.	"Worth Fighting For"	Peter Furler, Steve Taylor	4:07
7.	"Fearless"	Jonathan Smith, Maggie Reed, Mia Feldes	3:11
8.	"This I Know"	Aodhán King, Peter Furler, Reuben Morgan, Seth Mosley	4:45
9.	"Only the Son (Yeshua)"	Peter Furler, Summer Furler, Seth Mosley	4:07
10.	"Set Me Ablaze"	Bryan Torwalt, Katie Torwalt, Jacob Sooter, Mia Feldes	3:43
Total length:			37:03

Deluxe Edition
No.	Title	Length
1.	"Rejoice"
2.	"The Cross Has The Final Word"
3.	"Greatness Of Our God (Doug Weier Remix)"
4.	"Only The Son (Yeshua) (Doug Weier Remix)"

== Personnel ==
Newsboys United

- Michael Tait – lead and backing vocals
- Peter Furler – lead vocals
- Phil Joel – bass
- Jody Davis – guitars, backing vocals
- Jeff Frankenstein – keyboards, programming
- Duncan Phillips – drums, percussion

== Charts ==
Chart performance for United
Chart (2019)	Peak position
US Billboard 200	20
US Top Christian Albums (Billboard)	1

== Release history ==
Release history and formats for United
Region	Date	Format(s)	Label(s)
Various	10 May 2019	CD; digital download; streaming	Fair Trade Services
