= Worldwide Revival Pt.1 =

Worldwide Revival, Part 1

Studio album by Newsboys
- Released: 19 July 2024
- Recorded: 2023–2024
- Length: 31:00 (original); 47:00 (deluxe)
- Label: Capitol CMG

Newsboys chronology
Stand (2021)	Worldwide Revival, Part 1 (2024)

Alternative cover
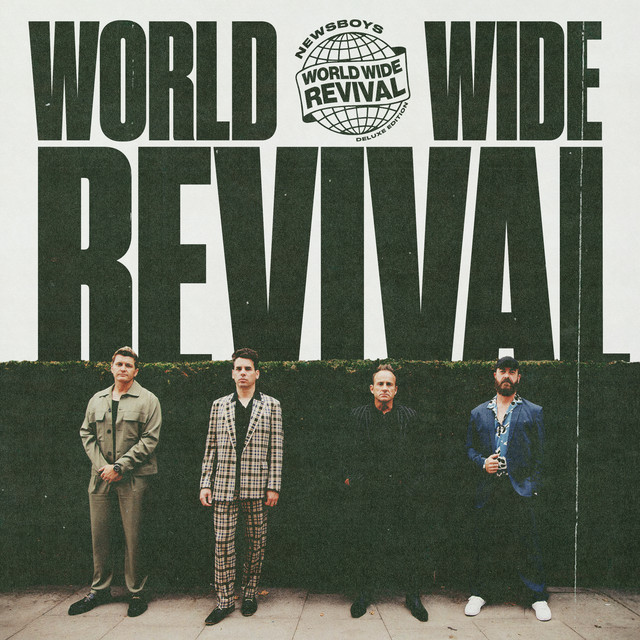
- Deluxe Edition cover removing Michael Tait

Professional ratings
Review scores
Source	Rating
365 Days of Inspiring Media	4.5/5 stars
Jesus Freak Hideout	2.5/5 stars
Today's Christian Entertainment	4/5 stars

Worldwide Revival, Part 1 is the 21st studio album by the Australian-American Christian rock band Newsboys.

The album was released 19 July 2024 through Capitol CMG. It marks Adam Agee's first album with the band since joining in 2023, Michael Tait's final album with the band before his exit in January 2025 and the band's final release under Capitol Christian Music Group, due to the band being dropped by the label in 2025 following sexual misconduct allegations against Tait.

== Singles and promotion ==
- The lead single from the album, "Heaven on Earth" was released on 15 March 2024 as the lead single from the album alongside a lyric video for the song. An accompanying music video was released on 5 April 2024.
- The title track, "Worldwide Revival" was released on 7 June 2024 as the second single with an accompanying lyric video.
- A music video for "How Many Times" was released on 19 July 2024 at the same time as the album. On 14 March 2025, a new version of the song with Adam Agee was released as a single under the title "How Many Times (oh how You love me)". An accompanying lyric video was released on 16 May 2025.
- A new version of "Christ and Christ Crucified" with Adam Agee was released as a single on 28 March 2025 with bilingual versions of the song in Portuguese and Spanish.

=== Other songs ===
- The album closer "He Lives" was released as a digital single on 31 March 2023 with an accompanying lyric video.
- "In God We Trust" was featured in the 2024 film God's Not Dead: In God We Trust. An accompanying lyric video for the song was released on 23 August 2024.

== Other releases ==
The album was reissued in 2025 as Worldwide Revival (Deluxe) adding four new songs sung by Agee as well as replacing Tait's vocals on the songs "How Many Times" and "Christ and Christ Crucified".

== Track listing ==
No.	Title	Writer(s)	Producer(s)	Length
1.	"Heaven On Earth"	Michael Tait, Seth Mosley, Adam Agee, Daniel Bashta, Tracey Campbell, Wes Campbell	Keith Everett Smith	3:19
2.	"Worldwide Revival"	Paul Duncan, Dave Lubben, Tait, Agee	Micah Kuiper, Dave Lubben	3:30
3.	"In God We Trust"	Agee, Colby Wedgeworth, Tait, Duncan, Wes Campbell, Tracey Campbell	Colby Wedgeworth, Luke Johns	3:39
4.	"How Many Times"	Agee, Jordan Sapp, Wes Campbell, Jonathon Gamble	Jordan Sapp	3:13
5.	"Color"	Tait, Agee, Michael Farren, Tony Wood	Seth Mosley	3:54
6.	"Eyes On Heaven"	Agee, Wedgeworth	Jeff Sojka, Wedgeworth	3:30
7.	"Christ And Christ Crucified" (feat. Lindy Cofer)	Lindy Cofer, Mitch Wong, Dustin Smith	Smith	4:54
8.	"He Lives"	Chris McClarney, Anthony Skinner, Jonathan Smith	Mosley	4:45
Total length:				31:00

Deluxe Edition
No.	Title	Writer(s)	Producer(s)	Length
1.	"How Many Times (Oh How You Love Me)" (Re-recorded version of "How Many Times" with Adam Agee)	Adam Agee, Jordan Sapp, Wes Campbell, Jonathon Gamble	Jordan Sapp	3:11
2.	"Fortress"	Sapp, Agee, Gamble	Sapp	3:43
3.	"New Name"	Agee, Colby Wedgeworth	Nick Rad, Ian Eskelin	3:25
4.	"Death Was Arrested"	Brandon Coker, Adam Kersh, Paul Taylor Smith, Heath Balltzglier	Seth Mosley	4:50
5.	"God Of Promises"	Joseph Schlueter	Sapp	4:16
6.	"Heaven on Earth"	Michael Tait, Seth Mosley, Agee, Daniel Bashta, Tracey Campbell, Wes Campbell	Keith Everett Smith	3:19
7.	"Worldwide Revival"	Paul Duncan, Dave Lubben, Tait, Agee	Micah Kuiper, Dave Lubben	3:30
8.	"In God We Trust"	Agee, Wedgeworth, Tait, Duncan, Wes Campbell, Tracey Campbell	Colby Wedgeworth, Luke Johns	3:39
9.	"Color"	Tait, Agee, Michael Farren, Tony Wood	Mosley	3:54
10.	"Eyes on Heaven"	Agee, Wedgeworth	Jeff Sojka, Wedgeworth	3:30
11.	"Christ And Christ Crucified" (feat. Lindy Cofer/Re-recorded version with Adam Agee)	Lindy Cofer, Mitch Wong, Dustin Smith	Smith	4:54
12.	"He Lives"	Chris McClarney, Anthony Skinner, Jonathan Smith	Mosley	4:45
Total length:				47:00

== Personnel ==
Newsboys

- Adam Agee - bass, guitars, vocals
- Jody Davis - lead guitar, vocals
- Jeff Frankenstein - keyboards, vocals
- Duncan Phillips - drums, percussions
- Michael Tait - lead vocals

== Charts ==
Chart performance for Worldwide Revival Pt. 1
Chart (2024)	Peak position
US Top Christian Albums (Billboard)	41

== Release history ==
Release history and formats for Worldwide Revival Pt. 1
Region	Version	Date	Format(s)	Label(s)	Ref.
Various	Original	19 July 2024	CD; digital download; streaming	Capitol CMG	
Various	Deluxe	30 May 2025	CD; digital download; streaming	Capitol CMG	
