= Love Riot (Newsboys album) =

Studio album by Newsboys
- Released: 4 March 2016
- Genre: Worship; Christian pop; Christian rock; pop rock
- Length: 37:44
- Label: Fair Trade / Sony Music-Columbia
- Producer: Zach Hall, Seth Mosley, Mark Needham, Mike "X" O'Connor

Newsboys chronology
Hallelujah for the Cross (2014)	Love Riot (2016)	United (2019)

Love Riot is the eighteenth studio album by the Newsboys. It was their first under the Fair Trade Services label, which released the album on 4 March 2016. Fair Trade is distributed by Sony Music through their Columbia Records brand.

== Critical reception ==
Professional ratings
Review scores
Source	Rating
365 Days of Inspiring Media	4.5/5 stars
CCM Magazine	3.5/5 stars
The Christian Beat	4/5 stars
CM Addict	4/5 stars
Jesus Freak Hideout	3.5/5 stars
New Release Today	3.5/5 stars
Today's Christian Entertainment	4.5/5 stars
Worship Leader	4.5/5 stars

Awarding the album three and a half stars for CCM Magazine, Matt Conner states, "Love Riot is the new album replete with new sonic touch points, most notably darker synth pulses," Kelly Meade, allocating the album a four and a half star rating at Today's Christian Entertainment, writes, "Complete with the hard hitting sounds & powerful vocals we've come to expect from the band, Love Riot is a welcome addition to all music collections." Giving the album three and a half stars from New Release Today, Marcus Hathcock says, "Expect to hear several of these songs top radio charts this year and further solidify the Newsboys as one of CCM's signature acts." Jay Akins, allocating the album four and a half stars for Worship Leader, states, "Newsboys simply elevates the listening experience with every track on their new record Love Riot.

Joshua Andre, allotting the album a four and a half star review by 365 Days of Inspiring Media, describes, "Well done guys for a stellar album, and one that will be on my music playlist for a long time!" Alex Caldwell, rating the album three and a half stars at Jesus Freak Hideout, states, "Love Riot does what an entry into a veteran band's catalog should do; it reminds you of what you liked about the artist in the first place while adding a few more moments to savor." Indicating in a three and a half star review from Jesus Freak Hideout, Lucas Munachen says, "With just enough of the old and new to satisfy fans of both, there's little reason to pass up on the action."

Christopher Smith, signaling in a three and a half star review for Jesus Freak Hideout, writes, "Michael Tait's powerful vocals, strong musical performances from longtime members Duncan, Jeff, and Jody, and just enough stylistic progression from Restart combine to make Love Riot a must-have for Tait-era Newsboys fans." Affixing a four star rating upon the album by The Christian Beat, Madeleine Dittmer describes, "Newsboys have once again successfully created a masterfully crafted collection of songs of good news. There is an unmistakable energy that runs through the album, giving it a celebratory feel...Newsboys again prove to be an institution in Contemporary Christian Music, boldly inspiring listeners and changing lives with each track." Jon Ownbey, bestowing a four star rating upon the album at CM Addict, states, "There is a good mix of faster paced music and some classic worship that will keep you from skipping through the tracks."

== Track listing ==
No.	Title	Writer(s)	Length
1.	"Crazy"	Hank Bentley, Mia Fieldes, Colby Wedgeworth	3:02
2.	"Hero"	Fieldes, Seth Mosley	3:48
3.	"Love Riot"	Nathan Barlowe, Bert Elliot, Zach Hall	3:34
4.	"Guilty"	Juan Otero, Pete Stewart	3:39
5.	"You Hold It All (Every Mountain)"	Mosley, Brandon Collins, Jordan Merritt, Travis Ryan	4:00
6.	"No Longer Slaves"	Joel Case, Jonathan David Helser, Brian Johnson	4:05
7.	"Family of God"	Mosley, Mark Stuart	4:20
8.	"Committed"	Bryan Fowler, Ethan Hulse, Christopher Stevens	3:39
9.	"Earthquake"	Barlowe, Hall, Mosley	3:51
10.	"What I Want Them to Say"	Otero, Micah Kuiper, Jason Walker	3:41
Total length:			37:44

== Charts ==
Chart (2016)	Peak position
US Billboard 200	14
US Top Alternative Albums (Billboard)	1
US Top Christian Albums (Billboard)	2
US Top Rock Albums (Billboard)	1
