= Shane & Shane discography =

- Studio albums: 32
- EPs: 3
- Live albums: 4

Contemporary worship duo Shane & Shane have released 27 studio albums (including one holiday album) and one live album, beginning with their first release, Psalms, in 2002.

The duo has released fourteen additional volumes of music and two additional Christmas albums specifically for their project The Worship Initiative.

== Studio albums ==
List of studio albums, with selected chart positions and certifications
Title	Album details	Peak chart positionds		
Title	Album details	US	US Christ.	US Indie
Psalms	Released: June 4, 2002; Label: Inpop; Formats: CD, digital download, streaming	—	11	—
Carry Away	Released: April 22, 2003; Label: Inpop; Formats: CD, digital download, streaming	149	13	—
Upstairs	Released: May 18, 2004; Label: Inpop; Formats: CD, digital download, streaming	— (Note: Upstars did not enter the Billboard 200 chart, but peaked at number 25 on the Billboard Top Heatseekers chart.)	11	—
Clean	Released: October 19, 2004; Label: Inpop; Formats: CD, digital download, streaming	123	5	—
Pages	Released: August 28, 2007; Label: Inpop; Formats: CD, digital download, streaming	66	5	—
Everything Is Different	Released: November 3, 2009; Label: Inpop; Formats: CD, digital download, streaming	— (Note: Everything Is Different did not enter the Billboard 200 chart, but peaked at number 96 on the Billboard Top Album Sales chart.)	7	—
Dare 2 Share: Unending Worship	Released: October 19, 2010; Label: Inpop; Formats: CD, digital download, streaming	—	48	—
The One You Need	Released: October 4, 2011; Label: Fair Trade; Formats: CD, digital download, streaming	57	4	—
Bring Your Nothing	Released: May 14, 2013; Label: Fair Trade; Formats: CD, digital download, streaming	68	3	—
The Worship Initiative, Vol. 1	Released: May 6, 2014; Label: Independent; Formats: Digital download, streaming	—	—	—
The Worship Initiative, Vol. 2	Released: May 27, 2014; Label: Independent; Formats: Digital download, streaming	—	43	—
The Worship Initiative, Vol. 3	Released: June 17, 2014; Label: Independent; Formats: Digital download, streaming	—	46	—
The Worship Initiative, Vol. 4	Released: July 8, 2014; Label: Independent; Formats: Digital download, streaming	—	50	—
The Worship Initiative, Vol. 5	Released: July 29, 2014; Label: Independent; Formats: Digital download, streaming	—	48	—
The Worship Initiative, Vol. 6	Released: August 21, 2014; Label: Independent; Formats: Digital download, streaming	—	—	—
The Worship Initiative, Vol. 7	Released: September 9, 2014; Label: Independent; Formats: Digital download, streaming	—	—	—
The Worship Initiative, Vol. 8	Released: September 30, 2014; Label: Independent; Formats: Digital download, streaming	—	—	—
The Worship Initiative, Vol. 9	Released: October 21, 2014; Label: Independent; Formats: Digital download, streaming	—	—	—
The Worship Initiative, Vol. 10	Released: November 18, 2014; Label: Independent; Formats: Digital download, streaming	—	—	—
The Worship Initiative	Released: April 28, 2015; Label: Fair Trade; Formats: CD, digital download, streaming	—	14	—
Psalms II	Released: October 23, 2015; Label: WellHouse; Formats: CD, digital download, streaming	179	9	11
The Worship Initiative, Vol. 11	Released: September 30, 2016; Label: Independent; Formats: Digital download, streaming	—	46	—
The Worship Initiative, Vol. 12	Released: April 14, 2017; Label: Independent; Formats: Digital download, streaming	—	—	—
The Worship Initiative, Vol. 16	Released: July 16, 2018; Label: Independent; Formats: Digital download, streaming	—	—	—
Hymns, Vol. 1	Released: September 7, 2018; Label: WellHouse; Formats: CD, digital download, streaming	—	21	27
The Worship Initiative, Vol. 17	Released: June 14, 2019; Label: Independent; Formats: Digital download, streaming	—	—	—
Hymns, Vol. 2	Released: August 23, 2019; Label: WellHouse; Formats: CD, digital download, streaming	—	—	—
The Worship Initiative, Vol. 18	Released: January 17, 2020; Label: Independent; Formats: Digital download, streaming	—	—	—
The Worship Initiative, Vol. 19	Released: February 28, 2020; Label: Independent; Formats: Digital download, streaming	—	—	—
The Worship Initiative, Vol. 20	Released: April 3, 2020; Label: Independent; Formats: Digital download, streaming	—	—	—
The Worship Initiative, Vol. 21	Released: June 19, 2020; Label: Independent; Formats: Digital download, streaming	—	—	—
Vintage	Released: July 10, 2020; Label: Independent; Formats: CD, LP, digital download, streaming	—	25	—
The Worship Initiative, Vol. 22	Released: September 25, 2020; Label: Independent; Formats: Digital download, streaming	—	—	—
Praise, Hymns, and Spiritual Songs, Vol. 1	Released: July 23, 2021; Label: Independent; Formats: Digital download, streaming	—	18	—
Vintage, Vol. 2	Released: July 12, 2024; Label: Independent; Formats: Digital download, streaming	—	—	—
Modern Hymns	Released: August 30, 2024; Label: Independent; Formats: Digital download, streaming	—	—	—
"—" denotes that a release that did not chart

== Live albums ==
List of live albums, with selected chart positions and certifications
Title	Album details	Peak chart positions		
Title	Album details	US Christ.	US Heat.	US Kid
An Evening with Shane & Shane	Released: September 13, 2005; Label: Inpop; Formats: CD, digital download, streaming	13	22	—
Psalms Live	Released: November 24, 2016; Label: WellHouse; Formats: CD, digital download, streaming	40	—	—
Hymns (Live)	Released: February 8, 2019; Label: WellHouse; Formats: CD, digital download, streaming	—	—	—
Hymns in the Round	Released: February 14, 2020; Label: Independent; Formats: Digital download, streaming	—	—	—
The Worship Initiative, Vol. 25	Released: April 16, 2021; Label: Independent; Formats: Digital download, streaming	—	—	—
Worship in the Word (with Kingdom Kids)	Released: January 28, 2022; Label: Independent; Formats: Digital download, streaming	—	—	14
Worship in the Word, Vol. 2 (with Kingdom Kids)	Released: September 2, 2022; Label: Independent; Formats: Digital download, streaming	—	—	—
Worship in the Word, Vol. 3 (with Kingdom Kids)	Released: September 22, 2023; Label: Independent; Formats: Digital download, streaming	—	—	—

== Christmas albums ==
List of Christmas albums, with selected chart positions and certifications
Title	Album details	Peak chart positionds	
Title	Album details	US Holiday	US Christ.
Glory in the Highest: A Christmas Record	Released: October 14, 2008; Label: Inpop; Formats: CD, digital download, streaming	29	48
A Worship Initiative Christmas	Released: December 2, 2014; Label: Independent; Formats: Digital download, streaming	—	16
A Worship Initiative Christmas, Vol. 2	Released: April 14, 2017; Label: Independent; Formats: Digital download, streaming	—	—
The Worship Initiative Christmas (EP)	Released: November 28, 2019; Label: Independent; Formats: Digital download, streaming	—	—
Worship in the Word, Christmas (with Kingdom Kids)	Released: November 18, 2022; Label: Independent; Formats: Digital download, streaming	—	—

== Extended plays ==
List of EPs, with selected chart positions and certifications
Title	Album details
The Worship Initiative, Vol. 13	Released: September 22, 2017; Label: Independent; Formats: Digital download, streaming
The Worship Initiative, Vol. 14	Released: October 31, 2017; Label: Independent; Formats: Digital download, streaming
The Worship Initiative, Vol. 15	Released: February 14, 2018; Label: Independent; Formats: Digital download, streaming
