= Patrick Nuo discography =

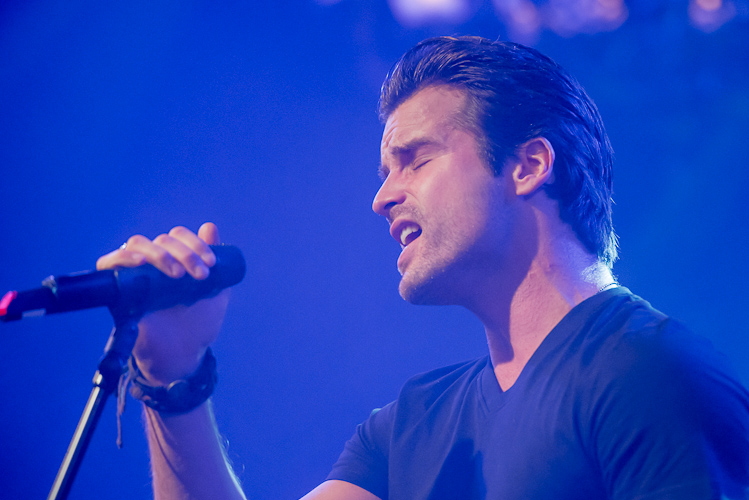
- Nuo in Luzern in December 2012.
- Studio albums: 3
- Singles: 10
- Music videos: 8

Swiss pop recording artist Patrick Nuo began his career in 2003, when he signed with Warner Music and released his debut album Welcome (2003). A top 20 chart success in Switzerland and Germany, it spawned three singles, including debut single "5 Days" and follow-up "Reanimate", which reached number 18 on the Swiss Singles Chart. The same year, Nuo joined Zeichen der Zeit, a Christian music project whose first single "Du bist nicht allein" became a top ten success in Germany. A second single released from the project's self-titled compilation album, "Ein weiterer Morgen", entered the top forty of the German Singles Chart the following year. Also in 2004, a reissue of Welcome was released. It produced the single "Undone", which served as the theme song for American comedy film Scooby-Doo 2: Monsters Unleashed (2004) in German-speaking Europe.

In May 2005, Nuo's second album Superglue was released. While not as commercially successful as Welcome in Germany, it would eventually become his highest-charting to date, reaching number four on the Swiss Albums Chart. Two singles were released from Superglue: "Girl in the Moon" and "Beautiful", the latter of which became his first and only top ten hit to date. The song peaked at number nine and number seven in Switzerland and Austria respectively. In 2006, Nuo reteamed with Zeichen der Zeit to produce their second album Generation David (2006), and participated in another non-profit-making aid project when she provided vocals for the Fury in the Slaughterhouse cover, charity single "Won't Forget These Days," released during the 2006 FIFA World Cup.

In 2007, after a label change to Ariola Records, Nuo's third album Nuo was released. It widely failed to match the success of his previous studio albums and produced three singles of which lead single "Watchin' Over You" became the only single to chart. In September 2009, the single "Come On Now" was released on Flash Records.

== Albums ==
List of albums, with selected chart positions, sales figures and certifications
Title	Album details	Peak chart positions		
Title	Album details	SWI	AUT	GER
Welcome	Released: 4 September 2003; Label: Warner Music	11	72	13
Superglue	Released: 6 May 2005; Label: Warner Music	4	68	29
Nuo	Release date: 8 June 2007; Label: Ariola Records	66	—	—
"—" denotes a recording that did not chart or was not released in that territory.

== Singles ==
=== As lead artist ===
List of singles, with selected chart positions and certifications, showing year released and album name
Title	Year	Peak chart positions			Album
Title	Year	SWI	AUT	GER	Album
"5 Days"	2003	23	24	24	Welcome
"Reanimate"	2003	18	56	22	Welcome
"Welcome (To My Little Island)"	2003	44	—	55	Welcome
"Undone"	2004	30	—	30	Welcome (Special Edition)
"Girl in the Moon"	2005	20	—	38	Superglue
"Beautiful"	2005	9	7	33	Superglue
"Watchin' Over You"	2006	54	—	52	Nuo
"Too Late (To Save It with a Love Song)"	2007	—	—	83	Nuo
"Finally"	2008	—	—	—	Nuo
"Come On Now"	2009	—	—	—	non-album release
"—" denotes a recording that did not chart or was not released in that territory.

=== As featured performer ===
List of singles, with selected chart positions and certifications, showing year released and album name
Title	Year	Peak chart positions			Album
Title	Year	SWI	AUT	GER	Album
"Du bist nicht allein" (with Zeichen der Zeit)	2003	63	32	8	Zeichen der Zeit
"Ein weiterer Morgen" (with Zeichen der Zeit)	2004	—	—	33	Zeichen der Zeit
"Ich trage dich" (with Zeichen der Zeit)	2006	—	—	56	David Generation
"I'd Love to Fall in Love for Christmas" (Edona featuring Patrick Nuo)	2006	—	—	—	non-album release
"Won't Forget These Days" (with Music Team Germany)	2006	—	—	48	non-album charity release
"The Sun" (Vivian featuring Patrick Nuo)	2009	—	—	—	Nordic Hotel
"—" denotes a recording that did not chart or was not released in that territory.

== Appearances ==
Song	Year	Artist(s)	Album
"Underwater"	2004	Patrick Nuo	Zeichen der Zeit
"Du bist nicht allein"	2004	Zeichen der Zeit	Zeichen der Zeit
"Ein weiterer Morgen"	2004	Zeichen der Zeit	Zeichen der Zeit
"Spezialize in Love"	2006	Patrick Nuo	David Generation
"Ich trage dich"	2006	Zeichen der Zeit	David Generation
"Psalm 100"	2010	Das Psalmenprojekt	Das Wasser des Lebens

== Music videos ==
Title	Year	Director(s)
"5 Days"	2003	Ralf Strathmann
"Undone"	2004	Christopher Häring, Fabian Knecht
"Girl in the Moon"	2005	Christopher Häring, Daniel Warwick
"Beautiful"	2005	Michael Koch, Peter Leckelt
"Watchin' Over You"	2006	Katja Kuhl
