= Advisory =

Advisory may refer to:

- Advisory board, a body that provides advice to the management of a corporation, organization, or foundation
- Boil-water advisory, a public health directive given by government to consumers when a community's drinking water could be contaminated by pathogens
- Homeroom, or advisory, is the classroom session in which a teacher records attendance and makes announcements
- Significant weather advisory, a Special Weather Statement advising inclement weather is likely or imminent

== See also ==
- Advice (disambiguation)
- Advisory Council (disambiguation)
