= Psalm (disambiguation) =

Psalms is a book of the Hebrew Bible and the Christian Old Testament.

Psalm or Psalms may also refer to:

- Psalms I, II, III, three commentaries by Mitchell Dahood
- Psalm West, youngest son of Kanye West and Kim Kardashian

== Music ==
- The "Swiss Psalm", Switzerland's national anthem
- Psalms, choral work by Lukas Foss (1922–2009)
- "Psalm", a song by Roxy Music from Stranded

=== Albums ===
- Psalm (Paul Motian album), 1982
- Psalm (Terl Bryant album), 1993
- Psalms (Shane & Shane album), 2002
- Psalms (Lorna Shore album), 2015
- Psalms II (album), a 2015 album by Shane & Shane
- Psalms, Tex Ritter 1958
- Psalms, Richard Smallwood 1997
- Psalms, Jah Wobble 1995
- Psalms (EP), Hollywood Undead 2018

== See also ==
- Tehillim (disambiguation)
