= All Over the World (JJ Weeks Band album) =

Studio album by JJ Weeks Band
- Released: March 26, 2013
- Genres: CCM, pop rock
- Length: 41:41
- Label: Inpop
- Producers: JJ Weeks, Scotty Wilbanks

JJ Weeks Band chronology
All Over the World (2013)	As Long as We Can Breathe (2016)

All Over the World is the first major label studio album by JJ Weeks Band. Inpop Records released the album on March 26, 2013. JJ Weeks Band worked with JJ Weeks and Scotty Wilbanks, in the production of this album.

== Critical reception ==
Professional ratings
Review scores
Source	Rating
Christian Music Zine	4.25/5
Cross Rhythms	8/10 squares
Indie Vision Music	3/5 stars
New Release Tuesday	4/5 stars

Awarding the album an eight out of ten for Cross Rhythms, Tony Cummings writes, "impressive set". Sarah Fine, giving the album four stars at New Release Tuesday, states, "Meaningful and full of heart, this is an album well worth the investment." Rating the album a 4.25 out of five from Christian Music Zine, Joshua Andre says, "JJ Weeks Band have recorded a stellar debut". Jonathan Andre, signaling in a three star review by Indie Vision Music, describes, "Well done guys for an enjoyable album!"

== Track listing ==
All tracks are written by JJ Weeks and Scotty Wilbanks unless noted below.

No.	Title	Writer(s)	Length
1.	"It Is Ever"	Luke Brown, Tofer Brown	3:58
2.	"Screaming Out Loud"		4:29
3.	"What Kind of Love"		4:34
4.	"We've Been There"		3:51
5.	"Sunrise"		4:21
6.	"Let Them See You"		4:23
7.	"Flood Down"	Austin Abbott, Weeks, Wilbanks	3:37
8.	"All Over the World"	Abbott, Weeks, Wilbanks	3:56
9.	"You Are the One"	Abbott, Weeks, Wilbanks	3:58
10.	"Save Us"		4:34
Total length:			41:41
