= Fusebox =

Fusebox, or variants, may refer to:

- Fuse box, or distribution board, in electric wiring
- FuseBox, a brand of distribution boards and related products
- Fuse box housing automotive fuses
- Fusebox (band), an American band
- Fuse Box (album), an AC/DC tribute album, 1995

== See also ==
- Fuse (electrical)#Fuse boxes
