= The Advice (album) =

Studio album by The Advice
- Released: March 26, 2013
- Genre: Contemporary Christian music, Christian rock, soul
- Length: 36:54
- Label: Inpop
- Producer: The Advice, Chuck Butler, Matt Houston, Rusty Varenkamp

The Advice chronology
| The Advice EP (2011) | The Advice (2013) |

The Advice is the first major label studio album from The Advice. Inpop Records released the album on March 26, 2013. The Advice worked with themselves along with Chuck Butler, Matt Houston, Rusty Varenkamp, in the production of this album.

== Critical reception ==
Professional ratings
Review scores
| Source | Rating |
|---|---|
| Indie Vision Music | 3/5 stars |
| Jesus Freak Hideout | 3/5 stars |
| New Release Tuesday | 4/5 stars |

Awarding the album three stars for Jesus Freak Hideout, Timothy Estabrooks writes, "In terms of pure artistic creativity and spiritual depth, this album is simply lacking." Sarah Fine, giving the album four stars at New Release Tuesday, states, "The album possesses strong points, some more than others, but paints a great overall picture of The Advice's passionate heart and unique mission for the music they create." Rating the album three stars from Indie Vision Music, Jonathan Andre says, "Well done guys for creating a solid album full of themes to ponder and discuss".

== Track listing ==
| No. | Title | Writer(s) | Length |
|---|---|---|---|
| 1. | "You Give Me" | Rhett Canipe, Jared Houston, Jeff Madden | 3:06 |
| 2. | "Love Me Like That" | Michael Farren, J. Houston, Madden | 3:25 |
| 3. | "Your Light Shines" | Aaron Bowen, Sanchez Fair, J. Houston, Matt Houston, Madden, Rusty Varenkamp | 3:29 |
| 4. | "Holding on to You" | Bowen, M. Houston, Bryan G. Williams, Karyn Williams | 3:36 |
| 5. | "All a Raindrop Knows" | J. Houston, Madden, Sam Mizell | 3:51 |
| 6. | "Your Love Sets Me Free" | Bowen, Fair, J. Houston, M. Houston, Madden | 3:30 |
| 7. | "The Sun Is Gonna Shine" | Bowen, Michael Fordinal, J. Houston, M. Houston, Madden | 3:24 |
| 8. | "Forever Changed" | J. Houston, M. Houston, Madden, Varenkamp | 3:12 |
| 9. | "His Name Is Jesus" | J. Houston, Madden | 2:46 |
| 10. | "Collide" | J. Houston, Madden, Jason Walker | 3:10 |
| 11. | "Make Me" | J. Houston, Madded, Mizell | 3:25 |
| Total length: | | | 36:54 |
