= Lean on Me (EP) =

- From left to right: Joshua, Caleb, Jordan

EP by Consumed by Fire
- Released: November 13, 2015
- Genre: Christian pop; Christian rock; Southern rock; alternative rock; pop rock
- Length: 13:18
- Label: Inpop
- Producer: Scotty Wilbanks

Consumed by Fire chronology
Lean on Me (2015)	Giving Over (2016)

Lean on Me is the first extended play from Consumed by Fire. Inpop Records released the EP on November 13, 2015. They worked with Scotty Wilbanks, in the production of this EP.

== Critical reception ==
Professional ratings
Review scores
Source	Rating
365 Days of Inspiring Media	4/5 stars
Cross Rhythms	8/10 squares
Jesus Freak Hideout	3.5/5 stars

Awarding the EP three and a half stars from Jesus Freak Hideout, Jeremy Barnes states, "Lean On Me is a testament to the Oklahoma-based three-piece's ability to craft radio worthy hits." Joshua Andre, giving the EP four star at 365 Days of Inspiring Media, writes, "Lean On Me is a release well worth your listen...for this short but punchy EP". Rating the album an eight out of ten for Cross Rhythms, Tony Cummings says, "Yep, Consumed By Fire are an excellent band I'd love to see make it to Big Church Day Out."

== Track listing ==
Track list
No.	Title	Writer(s)	Length
1.	"Lean on Me"	Caleb Ward, Jordan Ward, Joshua Ward	2:58
2.	"Walk Through the Fire"	Ward, Ward, Ward	3:18
3.	"Follow Your Heart"	Ward, Ward, Ward	3:14
4.	"You and Me"	Ward, Ward, Ward, Scotty Wilbanks	3:48
Total length:			13:18
