= Once Again (Fusebox album) =

Studio album by Fusebox
- Released: June 15, 2004
- Studio: Experientia Studios, Juggernaut Sound Lab, The Cellar, The Fiction and The Playground (Nashville, Tennessee).; Sound Kitchen (Franklin, Tennessee); Glow In The Dark Studios (Atlanta, Georgia); The Jukebox (Canton, Georgia)
- Genre: Contemporary Christian music, Christian rock, worship
- Length: 37:47
- Label: Elevate, Inpop
- Producer: Billy Buchanan; Ainsile Grosser; Joel Smallbone; Otto Price; Mac Powell; Scotty Wilbanks; Quinlan

Fusebox chronology
Lost in Worship (2002)	Once Again (2004)

Once Again is the second studio album by Fusebox. Elevate Records alongside Inpop Records released the album on June 15, 2004.

== Critical reception ==
Professional ratings
Review scores
Source	Rating
CCM Magazine	B
Christianity Today	2.5/5 stars
Cross Rhythms	8/10 squares
Jesus Freak Hideout	3.5/5 stars
The Phantom Tollbooth	4/5

Giving the album a B at CCM Magazine, David Mackle writes, "this group is proving worthy of independence." Russ Breimeier, signaling in a two and a half star review from Christianity Today, states, "Once Again is not bad, and there may be enough to recommend to those who never get enough of modern worship." Mike Rimmer, rating the album an eight out of ten for Cross Rhythms, says, "Billy has a fine voice, good ideas but still I believe his best work is ahead and I really want Fusebox to take an even edgier turn in order to stand out from the crowd." Josh Taylor, awarding the album three and a half stars at Jesus Freak Hideout, describes, "Once Again is a completely different experience, and well worth a listen." Rating the album a four out of five from The Phantom Tollbooth, Andrew West Griffin states, " a stellar second album called Once Again".

== Track listing ==
No.	Title	Writer(s)	Length
1.	"God Is Great"	Marty Sampson	4:08
2.	"Hello"	Billy Buchanan, Brad Duncan	3:44
3.	"Lord God Almighty"	Billy Buchanan	3:19
4.	"Once Again"	Matt Redman	3:33
5.	"All for You"	Billy Buchanan, Brad Duncan, Joel Smallbone	4:16
6.	"Thank You"	Billy Buchanan, Brad Duncan	3:16
7.	"Gotta Have Your Love"	Billy Buchanan	3:18
8.	"I'm Yours"	Billy Buchanan, Bruce Johnson	3:06
9.	"Look What You've Done"	Billy Buchanan, Krista Darin Lord, Stacy Darin Zepeda	4:29
10.	"Overture"		0:39
11.	"You Are So Beautiful"	Billy Preston, Bruce Fisher	3:59
Total length:			37:47

== Personnel ==
Fusebox

- Billy Buchanan – lead vocals, acoustic guitars, bass
- Brad Duncan – guitars
- Steve Conrad – bass
- Guy Roberts – drums, backing vocals

Additional musicians

- Ainsele Grosser – keyboards, programming, string arrangements
- Joel Smallbone – programming, backing vocals
- Otto Price – programming
- Scotty Wilbanks – keyboards
- Cary Barlowe – guitars
- Rob Hawkins – guitars
- Justin Mackey – guitars, backing vocals
- Michael Quinlan – guitars
- Ben Rodriguez – guitars, backing vocals
- Tyler Howell – bass
- Tony Morra – drums, programming
- Ben Phillips – drums
- Christa Black – strings, backing vocals, string arrangements
- Donnie Lewis – guest vocals (9)

=== Production ===
- Ainsele Grosser – executive producer, producer (1, 3–6, 11), mixing (2, 3, 7, 9, 11), engineer (3, 5, 6, 11), additional production (7, 9), additional engineer (7, 9)
- David Smallbone – executive producer
- Joel Smallbone – executive producer, producer (1, 3–6, 11), engineer (3, 5, 6, 11), mixing (3, 5, 6, 11), additional production (7, 9), additional engineer (7, 9), art direction, design
- Billy Buchanan – producer (1, 3–6, 11)
- Otto Price – producer (2), engineer (2)
- Mac Powell – producer (7, 9)
- Scotty Wilbanks – producer (7, 9)
- Quinlan – producer (8)
- Matt Goldman – engineer (7, 9)
- Marcelo Pennell – engineer (8), mixing (8)
- Tony Palacios – mixing (1, 4)
- Kenzi Butler – mix assistant (1, 4)
- Duncan Whitcombe – mastering at Mirror Sounds (Perth, Australia)
- Tyler Rogers – art direction, design
- Ben Smallbone – cover photography
- Van Alan Productions & Mgmt – management
