= An Evening with Shane & Shane =

Live album by Shane & Shane
- Released: September 13, 2005
- Genre: Contemporary worship
- Length: 45:11
- Label: Inpop
- Producer: Shane & Shane

Shane & Shane chronology
| Clean (2004) | An Evening with Shane & Shane (2005) | Pages (2007) |

An Evening with Shane & Shane is the first live album by the Contemporary worship duo Shane & Shane. The album was released on September 13, 2005 by Inpop Records label, and the producer on the effort are Shane & Shane.

== Music and lyrics ==
At Christian Broadcasting Network, Hannah Goodwyn affirmed that "the 2-disc set features the group’s powerful folk-worship, acoustic guitar sound and special DVD footage, including a studio tour and guitar lessons from Shane Barnard." Stuart Blackburn of Cross Rhythms highlighted that the release contains "accomplished acoustic guitar work provides the setting for stirring tenor harmonies that are so tight that you will frequently forget that this is live", and that the duo "present a worshipful set that combines lyrical simplicity with musical dexterity and hooks that penetrate." However, Blackburn did find that "there's a technical glitch in that the sound and vision are very fractionally out of sync."

== Reception ==
=== Critical ===
Professional ratings
Review scores
| Source | Rating |
|---|---|
| Christian Broadcasting Network | 4/5 spins |
| Cross Rhythms | 9/10 squares |

An Evening with Shane & Shane has received all positive reviews from just two music critics. Hannah Goodwyn of Christian Broadcasting Network found the album to contain "extraordinary harmonies of Shane & Shane are captured once again in this collection of live performances of fan favorites". At Cross Rhythms, Stuart Blackburn told that "this is inspiring stuff indeed and I for one shall be investigating back catalogue."

=== Commercial ===
For the Billboard charting week of September 24, 2005, the album was on the genre Christian Albums chart at No. 13 most sold, and it was on the breaking and entering chart as selling the No. 22 most.

== Track listing ==
All tracks are written by Shane Barnard except where noted.

Tracklist
| No. | Title | Writer(s) | Length |
|---|---|---|---|
| 1. | "Arise" | Barnard, Shane Everett | 3:46 |
| 2. | "Yearn" | | 3:45 |
| 3. | "Psalm 13" | | 4:16 |
| 4. | "Psalm 118" | | 3:48 |
| 5. | "Fringes" | | 3:26 |
| 6. | "Namesake" | | 2:59 |
| 7. | "Psalm 145" | | 5:59 |
| 8. | "You and I" | Barnard, Everett | 3:19 |
| 9. | "The Answer" | | 5:26 |
| 10. | "Saved by Grace" | | 3:50 |
| 11. | "I Miss You" | Barnard, Will Hunt | 4:37 |
| Total length: | | | 45:11 |

- Note: The album comes with a second Disc that is a DVD.

== Charts ==
| Chart (2005) | Peak position |
|---|---|
| US Christian Albums (Billboard) | 13 |
| US Heatseekers Albums (Billboard) | 22 |
