= Only You =

Only You may refer to:

== Film and television ==
=== Film ===
- Only You (1992 film), an American comedy directed by Betty Thomas
- Only You (1994 film), an American romantic comedy directed by Norman Jewison
- Only You (2011 film) or Always, a South Korean drama directed by Song Il-gon
- Only You (2015 film), a Chinese romantic comedy directed by Zhang Hao
- Only You (2018 film), a British romantic drama directed by Harry Wootliff
- Abo So ("Only You"), 2013 Aruban film

=== Television ===
- Only You (2002 TV series), a Chinese drama series
- Only You (2005 TV series), a Korean drama series
- Only You (2009 TV series), a Philippine remake of the Korean series
- Only You (2011 TV series), a Hong Kong drama series
- Only You (Thai TV series), a 2025 television series
- "Only You" (The Americans), a 2013 episode
- "Only You" (Once Upon a Time), a 2016 episode

== Music ==
- Only You (singer), Weng Li-you (born 1975), Taiwanese pop singer

=== Albums ===
- Only You (Harry Connick, Jr. album), 2004
- Only You (Karyn Williams album), 2012
- Only You (EP) by ShineBright, 2015
- Only You, by David Choi, 2008

=== Songs ===
- "Only You (And You Alone)", by the Platters, 1954; covered by the Hilltoppers (1955), Franck Pourcel (1959), Ringo Starr (1974), and others
- "Only You (Can Break My Heart)", by Buck Owens, 1965
- "Only You" (Cee Lo Green song), 2013
- "Only You" (Cheat Codes and Little Mix song), 2018
- "Only You" (Commodores song), 1983
- "Only You" (Gims song), 2021
- "Only You" (Josh Kelley song), 2005
- "Only You" (Miss A song), 2015
- "Only You" (Morning Musume song), 2011
- "Only You" (Nikki Laoye song), 2013
- "Only You" (Portishead song), 1998
- "Only You" (Starlight Express song), from the musical Starlight Express, 1984
- "Only You" (Teddy Pendergrass song), 1978
- "Only You" (Viktoria Modesta song), 2012
- "Only You" (Yazoo song), 1982; covered by the Flying Pickets (1983), Enrique Iglesias (1997), Kylie Minogue (2015), and others
- "Only You" (Zara Larsson song), 2017
- "Only You" (112 song), 1996
- "Only U", by Ashanti, 2004
- "Only You", by Alesso and Sentinel, 2022
- "Only You", by Alicia Keys from Keys, 2021
- "Only You", by Ayọ from Joyful, 2006
- "Only You", by Captain Jack, 1999
- "Only You", by Chicago from Chicago 17, 1984
- "Only You", by Ellie Goulding from Halcyon, 2012
- "Only You", by Fleetwood Mac from Live in Boston, 1985
- "Only You", by J. Cole and Burna Boy from The Fall-Off, 2026
- "Only You", by Kiss from Music from "The Elder", 1981
- "Only You", by Lasgo from Far Away, 2005
- "Only You", by Markus Feehily from Fire, 2015
- "Only You", by Martha and the Muffins from The World Is a Ball, 1986
- "Only You", by Metro Boomin from Not All Heroes Wear Capes, 2018
- "Only You", by Neil Diamond from On the Way to the Sky, 1981
- "Only You", by Praise, 1991
- "Only You", by the Pretty Reckless from Frankenweenie Unleashed!, 2012
- "Only You", by Rain from Rainism, 2008
- "Only You", by S Club Juniors from Together, 2002
- "Only You", by Roberto Zanetti (Savage), 1984
- "Only You", by Sarah Close, 2017
- "Only You", by Saturday, 2021
- "Only You", by Scatman John from Scatman's World, 1995
- "Only You", by Sofia Rotaru from Sofia Rotaru, 1972
- "Only You", by Sting from Brimstone & Treacle, 1982
- "Only You", by Taio Cruz from Rokstarr, 2009
- "Only You", by Sugababes from The Lost Tapes, 2022
- "Only You", by Toto from Kingdom of Desire, 1992
- "Only You", by the Wanted from Word of Mouth, 2013
- "Only U", by VIXX from Voodoo, 2013

== See also ==
- Solamente Tú (disambiguation)
