= My Coming Day =

Studio album by Julian Drive
- Released: January 27, 2009
- Genres: Contemporary Christian music, Christian alternative rock
- Length: 39:26
- Label: Inpop
- Producer: Lynn Nichols

My Coming Day is a studio album by Julian Drive. Inpop Records released the album on January 27, 2009. Julian Drive worked with Lynn Nichols, in the production of this album.

== Critical reception ==
Professional ratings
Review scores
Source	Rating
AllMusic	4/5 stars
Christianity Today	3/5 stars
Cross Rhythms	7/10 squares
Jesus Freak Hideout	4/5 stars
The Phantom Tollbooth	4/5

Awarding the album four stars for AllMusic, Jared Johnson writes, "My Coming Day is solid throughout and indicates a new yet familiar direction for contemporary Christian rock." Andre Dawn Goforth, rating the album three stars at Christianity Today, states, "there's strong musical skill and passion, so there's some promise for future projects." Giving the album a seven out of ten from Cross Rhythms, Paul Keeble describes it as "a solid debut." David Couch, awarding the album four stars at Jesus Freak Hideout, states, "The title of the album, My Coming Day, gives the impression of greater things to come, and there is no doubt, Julian Drive is one of the bands to watch out for this year." Rating the album a four out of five by The Phantom Tollbooth, Bob Felberg writes, "With a chorus that musically gathers you into its arms, and lyrics so loaded with hope, assurance and encouragement just one listen is transporting and uplifting."

== Track listing ==
No.	Title	Writer(s)	Length
1.	"From Your Hands"	Michael Shane Bowers, Jesse Triplett	4:12
2.	"Always There"	Michael Shaun Bennett, Bowers, Triplett	3:42
3.	"Cry"	Bowers	3:22
4.	"In You"	Bowers	4:09
5.	"Not My Fight"	Bowers	3:38
6.	"One Step Away"	Bennett, Bowers	3:50
7.	"Unplug"	Bennett, Bowers, Lynn Nichols, Triplett	4:01
8.	"You Can"	Bennett, Bowers, James Andrew Nitz	4:10
9.	"The Reason"	Dan Estrin, Chris Light Hesse, Markku Lappalainen, Douglas Sean Robb	4:09
10.	"My Coming Day"	Bowers	4:13
Total length:			39:26

== Chart performance ==
Chart (2009)	Peak position
US Top Christian Albums (Billboard)	31
US Heatseekers Albums (Billboard)	38
