= Ben Garrett =

Ben Garrett may refer to:

- Ben Garrett, of the American worship band Zealand Worship
- Ben Garrett, English art pop musician, known as Fryars
