= Giving Over =

Studio album by Consumed by Fire
- Released: March 25, 2016
- Genre: Christian pop; Christian rock; Southern rock; heartland rock; alternative rock; pop rock; folk rock; roots rock
- Length: 41:31
- Label: Inpop

Consumed by Fire chronology
Lean on Me (2015)	Giving Over (2016)

Giving Over is the first studio album by Consumed by Fire. Inpop Records released the album on March 25, 2016.

== Critical reception ==
Professional ratings
Review scores
Source	Rating
365 Days of Inspiring Media	4/5 stars
CCM Magazine	4/5 stars
Cross Rhythms	9/10 squares
Jesus Freak Hideout	4/5 stars
Jesus Wired	91/100
New Release Today	3.5/5 stars
Today's Christian Entertainment	4/5 stars

Awarding the album four stars at CCM Magazine, Andy Argyrakis describes, "the project is loaded with foot-stompin’ and roots rockin’ romps, plus several stripped down ballads, while the heartfelt lyrical spread ranges from the valley of struggle through the apex of victory." Jonathan J. Francesco, giving the album three and a half stars from New Release Today, states, "Fans of southern-tinged pop rock may have just found a new band to keep their eye on and definitely some new tracks to put on repeat." Rating the album four stars by 365 Days of Inspiring Media, writes, "Giving Over in my opinion, is a release well worth your listen, as we are drawn closer in communion to God, as well as more of an awareness about ourselves and how we as Christians behave. Well done guys for this exquisite album, one that I will listen to for a while yet!" Stephen Luff, indicating in a nine out of ten review for Cross Rhythms, says, "The kind of album which grows on you with each play and there's little doubt in my mind these Southern rockers will be around for the long haul."

Signaling in a four star review by Jesus Freak Hideout, Alex Caldwell pronounces, "While Giving Over doesn't synthesize all of the Ward brother's influences seamlessly (it usually takes a few albums to take all those sounds and make something that is your own), the album has the raw ingredients of a great debut album, and the promise that Consumed By Fire has good things in store down the road a piece." Kelly Meade, allocating the album a four star rating at Today's Christian Entertainment, calls, "The raw creativity displayed throughout Giving Over pulls listeners in with a unique musicality that provides a lively backdrop for the stories & message within the lyrics of the songs." Bestowing a 91 out of 100 rating at Jesus Wired, Stephanie Crail says, "Giving Over is the delightful new record from Consumed By Fire...This trio of brothers have put together a creative collection of pop/rock songs with a Southern flavor, and quite an impressive array of songwriting and musical talent."

== Track listing ==
No.	Title	Length
1.	"Lean on Me"	2:58
2.	"Thorns and Sorrows"	3:27
3.	"He Waits for Me"	4:22
4.	"Learning to Love"	4:58
5.	"Follow Your Heart"	3:16
6.	"Moving On"	4:26
7.	"Walk Through the Fire"	3:18
8.	"Hold the Rain"	3:53
9.	"You and Me"	3:47
10.	"Giving Over"	3:58
11.	"Crossroads"	5:08
Total length:		41:31
