= Lost in Worship =

Studio album by Fusebox
- Released: February 26, 2002
- Studios: Febo Studio (Franklin, Tennessee); Das's Bunk, The Gallery Studio, Catchings Sound and The Juggernaut Sound Lab (Nashville, Tennessee).
- Genres: Contemporary Christian music, Christian rock, worship
- Length: 49:28
- Labels: Elevate, Inpop
- Producers: Otto Price; David Das; Fusebox

Fusebox chronology
Lost in Worship (2002)	Once Again (2004)

Lost in Worship is the first studio album by Fusebox. Elevate Records alongside Inpop Records released the album on February 26, 2002.

== Critical reception ==
Professional ratings
Review scores
Source	Rating
CCM Magazine	B
Christianity Today	3/5 stars
Cross Rhythms	6/10 squares
Jesus Freak Hideout	3.5/5 stars
The Phantom Tollbooth	3/5

Awarding the album three stars for Christianity Today, Russ Breimeier writes, "Fusebox manages to stand apart in the glutted modern-worship-band market … but perhaps not for the reasons they'd like." Kevin Breuner, giving the album a B at CCM Magazine, states, "Those seeking to add more modern praise & worship music to their collection will enjoy Lost in Worship." Rating the album a six out of ten from Cross Rhythms, Trevor Kirk says, "A promising debut". John DiBiase, indicating in a three and a half star review by Jesus Freak Hideout, describes, "A good debut with joyful worship tunes to take the listener to a higher place". Signaling in a three out of five review for The Phantom Tollbooth, Zik Jackson writes, "Lost in Worship is a passionate, heartfelt collection of both new and familiar tunes."

== Track listing ==
No.	Title	Writer(s)	Length
1.	"Every Move I Make"	David Ruis	3:24
2.	"King (You Are My King)"	Billy Buchanan, Steve Conrad, Brad Duncan, David Das, Joel Hanson	4:01
3.	"Whisper"	Billy Buchanan, Brad Duncan, Rebecca St. James	4:40
4.	"Lost in Worship"	Billy Buchanan, Otto Price	3:45
5.	"Savior of My Soul"	Colin Battersby	4:32
6.	"Light the Fire"	Bill Maxwell	4:17
7.	"My Everything"	Billy Buchanan	4:06
8.	"Vision"	Matt Bronleewe, Rebecca St. James	4:29
9.	"In our Midst"	Alan Smith	4:34
10.	"I'd Trade it All"	Billy Buchanan, Steve Conrad, Scott Faircloff	4:02
11.	"I Will Exalt"	Michael Merritt	7:38
Total length:			49:28

== Personnel ==
Fusebox

- Billy Buchanan – lead vocals, backing vocals, guitars, vocal arrangements
- Brad Duncan – guitars, backing vocals
- Steve Conrad – bass, backing vocals

Additional musicians

- David Das – keyboards, programming, backing vocals, string arrangements
- Otto Price – programming, loops, bass, string arrangements, additional vocal arrangements
- Rob Tate – additional loops
- Jeff Bowders – drums
- Ron Tuttle – drums
- David Davidson – string arrangements
- The Love Sponge Orchestra – strings
- Christa Black – strings
- Rebecca St. James – guest vocals, additional vocal arrangements
- Sarah Das – backing vocals
- Trish Price – backing vocals
- Paul Shepard – backing vocals

Choir (Tracks 1 & 2)

- Charmaine Carrasco, Kelly Meredith, Austin Selby, Craig Shuff, Jeremy Westby and Daniel White

New Song Children's Choir (Track 6)

- Leslie Glassford – choir director
- Bayley Glassford, Bethany Glassford, Brittany Glassford, Colby Green, Brad Oliver, Kirsten Pate, Otto Price III, Jacob Strimaitis, Luke Strimaitis and Marisha Wagner – singers

== Production ==
- Ainslie Grosser – executive producer, engineer, mixing
- David Smallbone – executive producer
- Otto Price – producer, engineer
- David Das – producer (4, 7)
- Fusebox – producers (4, 7), engineers
- Rob Tate – engineer
- Bill Deaton – mixing
- Bryan Lenox – mixing
- Ken Love – mastering at MasterMix (Nashville, Tennessee)
- Ben Smallbone – photography, art direction, layout
- Najee Carrasco – hair, make-up, styling
- Platform Artist Management – management
