= VOTA (album) =

Studio album by VOTA
- Released: November 11, 2008
- Recorded: 2006–2008
- Genre: Christian rock
- Length: 37:52
- Label: INO/Columbia
- Producer: Nathan Dantzler

VOTA chronology
Live in Wichita (2007)	VOTA (2008)	VOTA Special Edition Digital Download (2009)

Singles from VOTA
- 1. "Hard to Believe" Released: October 2008; 2. "I'll Go" Released: July 2009

Professional ratings
Review scores
Source	Rating
Jesus Freak Hideout	3/5 stars
NewReleaseTuesday.com	7.5/10 stars
Christianity Today	4.5/5 stars

VOTA is the second self-titled album (though the first by this name) by the Christian rock band VOTA, formerly known as Casting Pearls. The album was released as a digital download on November 11, 2008, and released as a physical CD on February 10, 2009. The band is able to give $40.00 USD to Food for the Hungry through a matching grant with US AID for every album sold from their online store and merchandise table on tour. Since the digital release of the album in November, the band has helped raise over $200,000 for the Food for the Hungry project in Kenya (as of July 2009).

== Track listing ==
All tracks written by Bryan Olesen/Case Maranville/Scott Rutz except where noted.

1. "Hard to Believe" – 2:56
2. "Be Mine" – 2:56
3. "Love's Taken Over" – 3:13
4. "Honestly" Jason Ingram/Doug McKelvey/Bryan Olesen – 3:10
5. "Not Finished" – 3:06
6. "I'll Go" – 3:28
7. "Give It to Me" – 3:00
8. "Free to Fail" – 4:04
9. "Save Ourselves" Nathan Dantzler/Brad Irby – 3:51
10. "Bye Bye" – 3:35
11. "In My Heart" – 4:33
12. "Everyday Is the First Day" (Bonus Track) – 4:02
13. "Our Time Now" (Bonus Track) – 3:56
14. "Alright" (Bonus Track) from the Casting Pearls release
15. "Weighted" (Bonus Track) from the Casting Pearls release
16. "You Alone" (Bonus Track) from the Casting Pearls release

== Personnel ==
- Bryan Olesen – lead vocals, guitar
- Case Maranville – bass guitar, background vocals
- Riley Freisen – guitar, background vocals
- Scott Rutz – drums, percussion, background vocals

Additional personnel

- Phil Joel – background vocals
- Anthony Porcheddu – keyboards
- Chris Carmichael – string arrangements and performances (violin, viola and cello)
- Jim Cooper – piano, background vocals
- Nathan Dantzler – digital editing, programming, piano, percussion, keyboards, background vocals, additional guitars
- Gang Vocals: Brandon Spinazzola, Nathan Dantzler, Brad Irby and Paige Dantzler

== Charted singles ==
- "Hard to Believe" #17 (May 2, 2009)
