= Advice =

Advice (noun) or advise (verb) may refer to:

- Advice (opinion), an opinion or recommendation offered as a guide to action, conduct
- Advice (constitutional law) a frequently binding instruction issued to a constitutional office-holder
- Advice (programming), a piece of code executed when a join point is reached
- Advice (complexity), in complexity theory, a string with extra information used by Turing machine or other computing device
- Pay advice, also known as a pay slip
- HMS Advice, various Royal Navy ships
- Advice (EP), a 2021 EP by Taemin
- "Advice" (song), a 2018 song by Cadet and Deno Driz
- "Advice" (song), the debut single by Christina Grimmie
- "Advice", a song by Kehlani from her album SweetSexySavage
- "Advice", a song by Cavetown
- ADVISE (Analysis, Dissemination, Visualization, Insight, and Semantic Enhancement), a research and development program within the US Department of Homeland Security
- The Advice, an American Contemporary Christian band
  - The Advice (album), the band's 2013 debut album

== See also ==
- Advisor
- Advocate
