= JJ Weeks Band =

American contemporary Christian music band

- Origin: Macon, Georgia
- Genres: Worship; Christian pop; Christian rock; pop rock
- Years active: 2001–present
- Labels: Centricity; Inpop
- Members: Jason "JJ" Weeks; Jon Poole; David Hart; Cody Preston
- Past members: Austin Abbott; Jordan Welsh; Justin Lairsey; Garrett Lee; Robbie Fritz
- Website: jjweeksband.com

JJ Weeks Band is an American contemporary Christian music band from Macon, Georgia that began in 2001. The band is composed of lead vocalist and acoustic guitarist Jason Clint "JJ" Weeks, drummer Jon Poole, bass guitarist David Hart, and guitarist Cody Preston. Their 2013 release, All Over the World, with Inpop Records, saw several songs chart on various Christian Songs charts published by Billboard magazine, including: "Let Them See You," "What Kind of Love," and "Do Not Be Afraid." They are currently signed to Centricity Music where they released their most recent studio album, As Long as We Can Breathe in April 2016.

== Background ==
The contemporary Christian music and band formed in Macon, Georgia, in 2001. They count as their members; lead vocalist and acoustic guitarist, Jason Clint "JJ" Weeks, drummer, Jon Poole, bass guitarist, David Hart, and guitarist, Cody Preston. Their former guitarist was Garrett Lee.

== Music history ==
The group formed in 2001, yet their first major label studio album wasn't released until 2013, All Over the World, by Inpop Records on March 26, 2013. The song, "Let Them See You", charted on the Billboard magazine Christian Songs chart at No. 9, while it placed at No. 7 on the Christian Airplay chart. Another self-released song, "Do Not Be Afraid", charted on the Billboard magazine Christian Songs chart at No. 40, while it placed at No. 24 on the Christian Airplay chart. Their first single to chart upon the Billboard magazine charts was "What Kind of Love", and this peaked at No. 8 on the Christian Soft AC chart. The band signed a recording deal with Centricity Music, where they released a new studio album from the band, As Long as We Can Breathe, on April 8, 2016.

== Members ==
Current members

- Jason Clint "JJ" Weeks (born May 10, 1978) – Vocals

Former members

- Garrett Lee (born June 29) – Guitar
- Robbie Fritz (born January 23) – Drums
- Jon Poole (born December 5) – Drums
- David Hart (born February 21) – Bass
- Cody Preston (born July 19) – Guitar
- Austin Abbott – Guitar
- Justin Lairsey – Drums
- Jordan Welsh – Keyboard, Guitar

== Discography ==
Studio albums

List of studio albums, with selected chart positions
Title	Album details	Peak chart positions
Title	Album details	US Christ.
Free	Released: December 7, 2004; Label: Independent	—
Unsystematic Approach	Released: October 29, 2007; Label: Independent	—
Outloud	Released: November 2011; Label: Independent	—
All Over the World	Released: March 26, 2013; Label: Inpop	—
As Long as We Can Breathe	Released: April 8, 2016; Label: Centricity	44

'EPs

- Day EP (January 12, 2009, Independent)
- Live Acoustic EP (2012, Independent)
- Hallelujah EP (2015, Independent)
