= Upstairs (album) =

Studio album by Shane & Shane
- Released: May 18, 2004
- Genre: Contemporary worship
- Length: 45:19
- Label: Inpop
- Producer: Will Hunt, Shane & Shane

Shane & Shane chronology
Carry Away (2003)	Upstairs (2004)	Clean (2004)

Upstairs is the third studio album by the contemporary worship duo Shane & Shane. The album was released on May 18, 2004, by Inpop Records label, and the producers on the effort is Will Hunt and Shane & Shane.

== Music and lyrics ==
Dave Urbanski of CCM Magazine wrote that the release "sports a stellar sound", but has a feel that "is homogeneous, meandering and lyrically simplistic." At Christianity Today, Russ Breimeier wrote that to "some have said The Shanes are popular because they've found a way to express God's Word simply, yet effectively. There's truth to that, but don't discount their often overlooked musicianship and production, which helps elevate The Shanes' music from basic folk pop to worship music that is powerful, captivating, and intelligent." Cross Rhythms' Tom Lennie noted how "the lyrics are profound and intimate, the music creative, with interesting, varied percussion overlaid with deft guitar (and a touch of banjo/accordion in places) all topped with this duo's intense, yearning vocals." Josh Taylor of Jesus Freak Hideout evoked that "it seems the entire disc is aiming to please the fans that did not start listening because of the 'catchy pop' side of them."

== Reception ==
=== Critical ===
Professional ratings
Review scores
Source	Rating
CCM Magazine	C
Christianity Today	4/5 stars
Cross Rhythms	10/10 squares
Jesus Freak Hideout	3.5/5 stars

Upstairs has received generally positive reviews from the music critics. At Christianity Today, Russ Breimeier told that "Upstairs is not 'for fans only,' and is much better than one is led to believe." Tom Lennie of Cross Rhythms stated that "all in all, this has got to be one of the most original and beautiful acoustic worship sounds I've heard", which he wrote that "it's thumbs up all the way." Jesus Freak Hideout's Josh Taylor found this to be the duos' "least accessible disc to date", yet he called the effort a "brilliant album lyrically and will appeal to their folk fans most of all." At CCM Magazine, Dave Urbanski told that the album feels "off-the-cuff".

=== Commercial ===
For the week of May 29, 2004 music charts by Billboard, Upstairs was on the breaking and entering chart selling at No. 25 on the Heatseekers Albums, and it was on the genre charting Christian Albums in the No. 11 slot. It also charted on the Top Internet Albums chart at No. 297.

== Track listing ==
All tracks are written by Shane Barnard.

Tracklist
No.	Title	Writer(s)	Length
1.	"Psalm 13"		4:13
2.	"Holy"		4:38
3.	"I Miss You"	Barnard, Will Hunt	4:04
4.	"May the Few"		3:03
5.	"Beauty for Ashes"	Barnard, Kendall Combs	4:34
6.	"Still at Shore"		3:58
7.	"The Answer"		5:22
8.	"I Want It All"		4:00
9.	"Yearn"		4:22
10.	"Chapter One"		7:05
Total length:			45:19

== Charts ==
Chart (2004)	Peak position
US Christian Albums (Billboard)	11
US Heatseekers Albums (Billboard)	25
