= Live in Wichita =

Live album by Casting Pearls
- Released: August 29, 2007
- Recorded: April 19, 2007; Wichita, Kansas
- Genre: Christian rock
- Label: Big Box Records

Casting Pearls chronology
Casting Pearls (2004/2005)	Live in Wichita (2007)	VOTA (2008/2009)

Live in Wichita is a live album by Casting Pearls, now known as VOTA. It contains three live songs from the band's self-titled album Casting Pearls and two songs from the fall 2008 self-titled album VOTA.

== Track listing ==
1. "Alright"
2. "Love's Done Something"
3. "You Alone"
4. "Be Mine"
5. "Free to Fail"
