= Consumed by Fire =

American contemporary Christian music trio

- Also known as: CBF
- Origin: Wagoner, Oklahoma
- Genres: Christian pop; Christian rock; Southern rock; heartland rock; alternative rock; pop rock; folk rock; roots rock
- Years active: 2010–present
- Label: Inpop
- Members: Caleb Ward; Jordan Ward; Joshua Ward; Brandon Dorris
- Website: consumedbyfire.com

Consumed by Fire are an American contemporary Christian music brother trio from Wagoner, Oklahoma. They started making music in 2010, with their first album, Something Real, that was independently released. Their second release, Lean on Me, an extended play, released in 2015, with Inpop Records. The songs, "Walk Through the Fire" and "Lean on Me", both charted on the Billboard magazine charts. The band's latest single, "First Things First" is their debut release after signing with Red Street Records.

== Background ==
Consumed by Fire are a Christian rock brother trio from Wagoner, Oklahoma, where they grew up in the church their parents pastored, leading choir services and other musical functions within the congregation. Their parents are Pastors David Paul Ward and Vonda Sue Ward, who pastor Legacy Family Church, and head N.C.M.I. Training Center. They are lead vocalist and guitarist, Caleb Ward, drummer and background vocalist, Jordan Ward, and lead guitarist, Joshua Ward.

== Music history ==
The brother trio started as a musical entity in 2010, with their first independently released album, Something Real, that was released on July 13, 2010. Their first extended play, Lean on Me, was released on November 13, 2015, by Inpop Records. They released, a single, "Walk Through the Fire", where this peaked at No. 38 on the Billboard magazine Christian Airplay chart. The second single, "Lean on Me", peaked at No. 24 on the Christian Airplay chart, and it peaked at No. 31 on the Hot Christian Songs.

Their second full-length album, First Things First, was released on September 22, 2023, by Red Street Record.

== Members ==
Current members

- Caleb Paul Ward (born February 22, 1993) – lead vocals, guitar
- Jordan David Ward (born November 3, 1989) – drums, vocals
- Joshua Dale Ward (born April 12, 1985) – lead guitar

== Discography ==
Studio albums

- Giving Over (March 25, 2016, Inpop)
- First Things First (September 22, 2023, Red Street Records)

EPs

- Lean on Me (November 13, 2015, Inpop)

What IF (Jan 31, 2025, Red Street Records)

Singles

Single	Year	Chart Positions	
Single	Year	US Christ	US Christ Air
"Walk Through the Fire"	2015	—	38
"Lean on Me"	2015	31	24
"I Need You God"	2017	29	23
"First Things First"	2022	9	9
"What If"	2025	—	25
"Higher Places"	2026	—	21
