= Tehillim =

Tehillim (תהלים) may refer to:

- The Hebrew name of the biblical Book of Psalms
- Tehillim (Reich), a 1981 piece of music by Steve Reich
- Tehilim (film), a 2007 Israeli film directed by Raphaël Nadjari
- Tehillim, 2010 and 2014 compositions by David Ezra Okonşar

== See also ==
- Psalm (disambiguation)
