= Sarah Brendel =

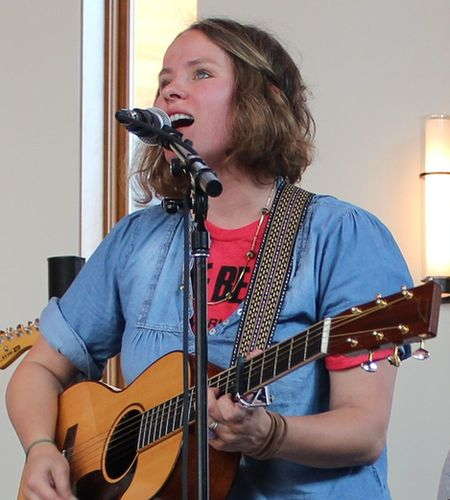
- Sarah Brendel performs at the Lille Gård festival in June 2012.

Background information
- Born: 1976 (age 49–50)
- Origin: Dresden, Germany
- Genres: Folk, Christian pop, Christian rock
- Years active: 1998–present
- Labels: Pila Music, ZYX, Inpop, Gerth Medien, Eisenbahn
- Website: www.sarahbrendel.de

Sarah Brendel is a Folk/Pop singer from Dresden, Germany. She has achieved success in Germany and internationally, releasing an album with Franklin, Tennessee-based Inpop Records in 2005. Her song "Be With You" spent two weeks on the German singles chart in 2002 and peaked at No. 86. She is part of the Zeichen der Zeit (Sign of the Times) project alongside artists such as Xavier Naidoo and Yvonne Catterfeld. This project proved to be her break after it landed on top 10 German album charts. As well, her song "Fire" reached number 86 on the American Billboard airplay charts.

One of Brendel's musical influences early in her career was Larry Norman. In 2008 Norman recorded his two last songs with her: "Back to the Dust" and "Walking Backwards" appear on Brendel's record Early Morning hours. The song "Take My Heart" from her self-titled album appeared in the movie The Poet. CCM magazine praised that album's excellent lyrics.

== Discography ==
Higher Hope (review)

- Released: 1998
- Label: Pila Music

Subrosa

- Released: 2001
- Label: Pila Music

Under the Fire

- Released: 2003
- Format: CD
- Label: ZYX
- Producer: Udo Rinklin
- Tracks: "Commodity", "Catherine Wheel", "Breathing In", "Babel Towers", "Fire", "King I Love", "No More", "Pardon Me", "Confused", "Slowly", "The Revers"
- Bonus tracks: "Be With You", "Take My Heart" (Filmversion), "Christival TV-Spot"
- Singles: "Be With You", "Take My Heart"

Sarah Brendel (North American, Scandinavian and Netherlands release of Under the Fire. reviews)

- Released: 2005
- Format: CD
- Label: Inpop Records
- Producer: Udo Rinklin
- Tracks: "Commodity", "Fire", "Turn", "Breathing In", "King I Love", "Catherine Wheel", "Pardon Me", "Confused", "Babel Towers", "No More"
- Singles: "Fire"

One Day Recordings

- Released: 2 December 2005
- Format: CD
- Label: Sound 'N' Scripture
- Producer: Udo Rinklin
- Tracks: "To My Glorious", "Into Another Land", "I'd Like to Tell You", "Selfparalyzed", "For Your Beauty", "Lonesome Pilgrim", "Peace.Peace.PEACE"
- Bonus tracks: "Coming Up!", "Back to the Dust"

Early Morning Hours (review)

- Released: 2008
- Format: CD
- Label: Gerth Medien
- Producer: Udo Rinklin
- Tracks: "Early Morning Hours", "Song of Love", "Back to the Dust", "Selfparalyzed", "Dancers of the Night", "Crush on You", "Burning of the Ages", "Keep Us Alive", "Write Down", "Into Another Land", "Travel with Me", "Here Comes the Day Again", "Walking Backwards"

Before the Mountains

- Released: 2011
- Format: CD
- Label: Eisenbahn Records
- Producer: Arno Jordan, Sarah Brendel and Matt Krysko
- Tracks: "Beat Underneath", "Think Back", "What a Happy Life", "Before the Mountains", "Dangerous Cities", "Snow White Fields", "To Hungry Listeners", "Enter My Door", "Yaweh", "Heartuplifter", "Little Mirror", "Read Your Mind", "Out of the Skies + Skies", "Poets", "Speak Out"

Singles

- "Be With You" (ZYX, 2002)
- "Take My Heart" (ZYX, 2003) (in the film soundtrack The Poet with Jürgen Prochnow)
- "Fire" (Inpop, 2005)

Songs in other projects

- In Love with Jesus (box set), "Gott Sieht Unsere Tränen" (Gerth Medien, 2005)
- Every Young Woman's Battle, "Breathing In" (Fervent, 2005)
- Mystic Spirits, Vol. 8, "Hands" (ZYX, 2005)
- Absolute Smash Hits, Vol. 2, "Fire" (Fervent/Curb, 2005)

Awards

- 2009 David Award (best album) Early Morning Hours
