= Everything Is Different =

Studio album by Shane & Shane
- Released: November 3, 2009
- Genre: Contemporary worship
- Length: 66:11
- Label: Inpop
- Producer: Jason Hoard, Pete Kipley, Shane & Shane

Shane & Shane chronology
Glory in the Highest: A Christmas Record (2008)	Everything Is Different (2009)	The One You Need (2011)

Everything Is Different is the sixth studio album by contemporary worship duo Shane & Shane. The album was released on November 3, 2009, by Inpop Records label, and the producers on the release are Jason Hoard, Pete Kipley, and Shane & Shane.

== Music and lyrics ==
Kim Jones of About.com told that "the tight harmonies and catchy, Biblically Based lyrics are everything we've come to expect from Shane & Shane and the lack of extra bells and whistles help their sincerity and passion shine through." Allmusic's Jared Johnson found that "the pure emotion of their harmonic tribute to the heavens gushes with each note." At CCM Magazine, Andrew Greer highlighted that "maintains mostly acoustic motifs from top to bottom...letting the easy-to-remember melodies and the duo's trademark harmonies lead the way."

Christian Broadcasting Network's Rob Vischer wrote that "The duo's impassioned harmonies still simmer over a raw acoustic set to create an organic "front row" experience." At The Christian Manifesto, Dan Harmeson stated that the duo has put "into writing and producing songs that will stir and inspire us, and they don’t miss a beat with this album." Kevin Davis of Christian Music Review commented that "Musically this album is very diverse and the songs are acoustic oriented with very biblical lyrics", and this led to "Harmonizing together on every song" that is done with "personal and vulnerable vocals", which has not "sounded better."

At Christianity Today Andrea Dawn Goforth claimed that the duo is "folkier than ever here" and the album contains "backbeat rhythm on songs throughout" with "tight harmonies and poppy hooks". Julie Porter of Cross Rhythms alluded to how the listener "will hear a tinge Nashville, Tennessee in the crafted, acoustic pop" that "occasionally though a rock feel shows through". Jesus Freak Hideout's Logan Leasure evoked that "Everything Is Different gives the duo a chance to turn up the creativity level once again and reconnect with their fans." Suzanne Physick of Louder Than the Music told that "the lyrics carry this album though and there are moments when you will sit up and pay attention because there's a cute hook in a melody or a really great harmony but for the most part this album is well executed country-tinged rock with more passion than creativity."

== Critical reception ==
Professional ratings
Review scores
Source	Rating
About.com	3.5/5 stars
Allmusic	4/5 stars
CCM Magazine	4/5 stars
Christian Broadcasting Network	4/5 stars
The Christian Manifesto	4.5/5 stars
Christian Music Review	4.5/5 stars
Christianity Today	3/5 stars
Cross Rhythms	8/10 squares
Jesus Freak Hideout	3.5/5 stars
Louder Than the Music	3/5 stars

Everything Is Different has received mostly positive reviews from the music critics. About.com's Kim Jones called it a "faith-filled and emotional album." Jared Johnson of Allmusic proclaimed the album to be the duos' "greatest contribution yet to the contemporary worship canon."

At CCM Magazine, Andrew Greer found that the release "provides yet another glimpse into the heart of Shane & Shane." Rob Vischer of Christian Broadcasting Network vowed that "this album is worth it." The Christian Manifesto's Dan Harmeson claimed that the album "will put a smile in your face" because the release contains "intimate" songwriting, which the duo "has the power to do just that."

At Christian Music Review, Kevin Davis told that "each successive album has improved on the last". Logan Leasure of Jesus Freak Hideout highlighted that "the spiritual messages do justify giving Everything Is Different a spin at least", however, the "next time around, we'll hope for a little more risk, but for now, the duo that Christian music has come to love over the past decade remains in their stronghold."

At Christianity Today, Andrea Dawn Goforth commented that "unfortunately, though each track is well crafted, the tunes are fairly homogeneous, leaving me wishing each song was different—and not just the title." Suzanne Physick of Louder Than the Music wrote that "unfortunately it isn't long before it becomes apparent that the focus of the album is lyrical."

== Commercial performance ==
On the music charts the week of November 15, 2013, the album charted as the seventh Billboard Christian Album sold.

== Track listing ==
All tracks are written by Shane Barnard.

No.	Title	Writer(s)	Length
1.	"Everything Is Different"		4:27
2.	"The Lord's Prayer"		3:35
3.	"Worthy of Affection"	Barnard, Shane Everett	5:39
4.	"Great Reward"		3:36
5.	"I'm Alive"		4:35
6.	"My Portion (Ps 73)"		6:19
7.	"You Say, "I'm Rich""		3:34
8.	"For the Good"		4:11
9.	"Rain Down"	Barnard, Everett	3:27
10.	"This is Who I Am"		4:50
11.	"Turn Down the Music"	Barnard, Matt Maher, David Nassar	5:07
12.	"My Hope is Built" (radio edit)	Barnard, Everett	3:56
13.	"I'm Alive" (radio edit)		4:24
14.	"Everything Is Different" (radio edit)		4:27
15.	"Rain Down" (radio edit)	Barnard, Everett	4:04
Total length:			66:11

== Charts ==
Chart (2009)	Peak position
US Christian Albums (Billboard)	7
