= Zealand Worship - The EP =

EP by Zealand Worship
- Released: June 23, 2015
- Genre: Contemporary Christian music, worship, rock
- Length: 24:27
- Label: Word, Warner

Zealand Worship - The EP is the first extended play from Zealand Worship. Word Records and Warner Records released the EP on June 23, 2015. An alternate version containing the song "Good Good Father," and a slightly reworked track listing, was released on September 11, 2015.

== Critical reception ==
Professional ratings
Review scores
Source	Rating
365 Days of Inspiring Media	4.5/5 stars
CCM Magazine	4/5 stars
The Christian Beat	4.3/5
Christ Core	10/10
Jesus Freak Hideout	3.5/5 stars
New Release Today	4/5 stars
Worship Leader	3/5 stars

Awarding the EP four stars from CCM Magazine, Matt Conner states, Phil Joel and Zealand Worship's music seeks "to equip and edify the church." Jonathan J. Francesco, giving the EP four stars at New Release Today, writes, "Despite its safe and familiar approach, this is a refreshing and exciting release with catchy worship numbers and uplifting musical standouts." Rating the album three stars for Worship Leader, Graham Gladstone says, "The EP will probably be most fruitful wherever big sound is the priority." Rating the album a ten out of ten for Christ Core, Phillip Noell says, "the worship was so powerful". Allocating the album a 4.3 rating at The Christian Beat, Chris Major responds, "The EP is truly powerful and inspiring."

Jonathan Andre, indicating in a four and a half star review by 365 Days of Inspiring Media, describes, "While we as a site reviewed Zealand’s EP release way back in June when it was only available via their website, this newly written review for their iTunes debut of their EP (7 tracks instead of 6, with the introduction of “Good Good Father”) continues to firm my assertion that Zealand, as a worship band with enthusiasm, heart and poignancy, is by far one of the most passionate bands out there currently, when compared to other like Rend Collective, Crowder and The City Harmonic, to name a few." Signaling in a four and a half star review at 365 Days of Inspiring Media, Joshua Andre recognizes, "Personally the only downside to this EP is that it’s too short! 6 songs (essentially 5 songs!) goes by very quickly, particularly when one is immersed in such a poignant and heartfelt EP, with Phil enthusiastically championing Jesus and singing His praises."

== Track listing ==
Track list
No.	Title	Length
1.	"Awaken (Prelude)"	2:19
2.	"You Awaken My Soul"	5:06
3.	"That's Who You Are"	4:05
4.	"Savior"	4:08
5.	"Greener"	4:06
6.	"Lead Us To Your Heart"	4:43
Total length:		24:27

=== Alternate version ===
Track list
No.	Title	Length
1.	"Awaken (Prelude)"	2:19
2.	"You Awaken My Soul"	5:06
3.	"Good Good Father"	3:38
4.	"Savior"	4:08
5.	"Greener"	4:06
6.	"That's Who You Are"	4:05
7.	"Lead Us To Your Heart"	4:43
Total length:		28:02
