= Pages (Shane & Shane album) =

Studio album by Shane & Shane
- Released: August 28, 2007
- Genre: Contemporary worship
- Length: 60:42
- Label: Inpop
- Producer: Will Hunt

Shane & Shane chronology
An Evening with Shane & Shane (2005)	Pages (2007)	Glory in the Highest: A Christmas Record (2008)

Pages is the fifth studio album by the Contemporary worship duo Shane & Shane. The album was released on August 28, 2007, by Inpop Records label, and the producer on the effort is Will Hunt.

== Reception ==
=== Critical ===
Professional ratings
Review scores
Source	Rating
Allmusic	3.5/5 stars
CCM Magazine	3.5/5 stars
Christian Broadcasting Network	4/5 stars
Christianity Today	3.5/5 stars
Cross Rhythms	8/10 squares
Jesus Freak Hideout	4/5 stars

Pages has received generally positive reviews from the music critics. Allmusic's Jared Johnson found that the duo on the release "stretch their legs in the pop realm and rely less on straightforward worship", but "there is little to distinguish this album from other worship projects out there". At CCM Magazine, Andy Conway opined that "Pages is honest, oftentimes in-your-face, deep and challenging" and shows "these guys are great writers/musicians." Linda Michaels of Christian Broadcasting Network called the release "Soulful and soothing, intimate and inspiring". At Christianity Today, Russ Breimeier noted that "Pages is as pretty, passionately performed, and worshipful as you'd expect from Shane & Shane, plus chock full of interesting ideas", however at the same time "the music isn't as compelling, and frankly, sometimes boring." Iain Nash of Cross Rhythms called this "a beautiful album filled to the brim with strong ballads, each song [reflecting] upon the salvation and freedom that can be experienced by resting in the presence of God." Jesus Freak Hideout's Jessica Gregorius proclaimed it to be a "spiritually satisfying release", and wrote that the duo "continue to amaze".

=== Commercial ===
For the week of September 8, 2007, Pages ranked as the 66th most-bought album in the United States on the Billboard 200 chart, and was the fifth most sold Christian Album.

== Track listing ==
All tracks are written by Shane Barnard.

Track list
No.	Title	Length
1.	"Vision of You"	4:48
2.	"We Love You Jesus"	3:27
3.	"Burns Us Up"	4:22
4.	"Over the Sun"	3:30
5.	"Interlude"	1:11
6.	"Beg"	4:34
7.	"In You"	4:03
8.	"Holiday"	3:44
9.	"Psalm 62"	4:10
10.	"Bad Days Better"	4:14
11.	"Embracing Accusation"	6:54
12.	"Before the Throne of God Above"	4:40
13.	"Wounded"	4:17
14.	"Healed"	3:11
15.	"When I Think About the Lord"	3:37
Total length:		60:42

== Charts ==
Chart (2007)	Peak position
US Billboard 200	66
US Christian Albums (Billboard)	5
