= Solamente Tú =

Solamente Tú (Only You) may refer to:

- Solamente Tú (album), or the title song, by Duelo
- "Solamente Tú" (song), by Pablo Alborán
- "Solamente Tú", a song by Eme 15 from Eme 15
- "Ven Conmigo (Solamente Tú)", a song by Christina Aguilera, the Spanish-language version of "Come On Over Baby (All I Want Is You)"

== See also ==
- Only You (disambiguation)
