= VOTA =

American Christian rock band

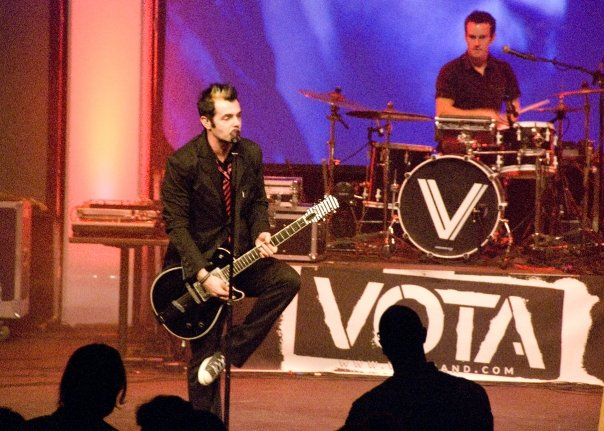
- VOTA performing in 2007

Background information
- Also known as: Casting Pearls (1997–2008)
- Origin: Lincoln, Nebraska, United States
- Genres: Christian rock, CCM
- Years active: 1997–present
- Labels: INO, Inpop, Big Box Entertainment
- Members: Bryan Olesen; John Wooten
- Past members: Justin Wantz; Stefan Carlson; Scott Rutz; Riley Friesen; Cody Bender; Case Maranville; Jeff Goff; Zach Lardy; Graham Lyons; Christian Hale
- Website: votaband.com

VOTA (formerly known as Casting Pearls) is a Christian rock band from Lincoln, Nebraska, featuring Bryan Olesen, a former guitarist with Christian rock band Newsboys. Several of the band's songs have been featured on rotation with national radio networks such as K-Love, and are part of the international 180 Tour. Their song "Hard to Believe" was listed at No. 17 on R&R magazine's May 2, 2009, weekly chart for the United States.

== History ==
Casting Pearls was formed by Bryan Olesen and bass guitarist Case Maranville in 1997 when they joined drummer Shane Coop. After a few line-up changes, the band solidified in 2003 to include Olesen, Maranville and drummer Scott Rutz. In July 2003, the band met Peter Furler of Newsboys which led to Olesen's tenure as lead guitarist for Newsboys from 2003 to early 2006 and the self-titled release on Furler's Inpop Records of Casting Pearls in 2005.

In 2008, the band changed its name to VOTA due to confusion with similarly named Christian artist Casting Crowns. Originally, the name was a typo in an email from their management team as the band, management and label were brainstorming new names. The name was ultimately chosen by the band as being without a specific meaning and having a bit of mystery to it, allowing their fans to individually interpret the meaning. In summer 2008, while performing at an Oklahoma summer camp, the band discovered the name does have a spiritual meaning. Vota is a Latin root word that stands for a collection of vows before God.

2009 saw the departure of band members Riley Friesen, who left to start a recording studio, Coda Record House, and original Casting Pearls member Scott Rutz, who left the band to pursue an advertising and marketing career. Jeff Goff and Cody Bender joined the band shortly before the 2009 LifeLight Festival in Sioux Falls, South Dakota. Near the end of their 2010 tour with BarlowGirl guitarist Cody Bender left the band to focus on his personal life.

A new line-up was announced on September 27, 2010, with Case Maranville and Jeff Goff left replaced by John Wooten (drums), Justin Wantz (guitar and keyboard) and Stefan Carlson (bass guitar), leaving Olesen as the only remaining original Casting Pearls member.

A third studio album, Love Found Me, was announced in late 2012 and was released January 8, 2013. "Love Found Me" was a campaign in collaboration with non-profit organization, Tiny Hands international, to fight human trafficking in India and Nepal. In a non-traditional sense, the band decided to give away this album for free by having fans visit lovefoundme.org. Before getting the album, fans must watch a video about human trafficking and this campaign, and then have the option to attain a second bonus album by donating any amount of money to Tiny Hands International.

In 2016, they released Fearless to support 300 children in Panali, Nicaragua with Food for the Hungry.

In 2018, they became a two-piece band with Olesen playing both guitar and bass via a guitar he custom modified and Wooten playing drums and keys.

== Discography ==
All releases up until 2008's VOTA were released under the name Casting Pearls. All of these recordings, except Really Great Sinners, can now be found under the band's new name, VOTA.

=== Albums ===
Year	Title	Label	Chart peaks		
Year	Title	Label	US	US Heat	US Christ
2000	Really Great Sinners	Self-released	—	—	
2004	Casting Pearls	Big Box Records/Inpop Records	—	—	—
2007	Live in Wichita	Inpop Records	—	—	—
2008	VOTA	INO Records	—	33	25
2009	VOTA: Special Digital Edition	INO Records	—	—	—
2013	Love Found Me	Big Box Records	—	—	—
2016	Fearless	Big Box Entertainment	—	—	—

=== EPs ===
Year	Title	Label	Chart peaks	
Year	Title	Label	US	US Christ
2002	Rock	Big Box Records	—	—
2012	God of the Universe	Big Box Records	—	—

=== Singles ===
Year	Title	Album	Chart peaks	
Year	Title	Album	Hot 100	Hot Christ.
2008	"Hard To Believe"	VOTA	—	27
2009	"I'll Go"	VOTA	—	—
2009	"Honestly"	VOTA	—	—
2012	"God of the Universe"	Love Found Me	—	—

== Members ==
=== Current members ===
Bryan Olesen – lead vocals, guitar, bass (1997–present)
John Wooten – drums, keys (2010–present)

=== Former members ===
Case Maranville – bass guitar (1997–2010)
Shane Coop – drums (1997–2003)
Scott Rutz – drums (2003–2009)
Lee Bowes - guitar (2002-2005)
Riley Friesen – guitar (2008–2009)
Jeff Goff – drums (2009–2010)
Cody Bender – guitar (2009–2010)
Justin Wantz – guitar, keyboard (2010–2014)
Stefan Carlson – bass guitar (2010–2014)
Zach Lardy – bass guitar, keys (2014–2018)
Graham Lyons – guitar (2014–2018)
Christian Hale – keyboards (2015–2018)
