= Carry Away =

Studio album by Shane & Shane
- Released: April 22, 2003
- Studio: The Playroom (Plano, Texas); Sound Stage Studios (Nashville, Tennessee).
- Genre: Contemporary worship
- Length: 51:33
- Label: Inpop
- Producer: Shane Barnard, Joel Cameron, Shane Everett

Shane & Shane chronology
Psalms (2002)	Carry Away (2003)	Upstairs (2004)

Carry Away is the second studio album by the contemporary worship duo Shane & Shane. The album was released on April 22, 2003, by Inpop Records label, and the producers on the effort is Shane Barnard, Joel Cameron and Shane Everett.

== Music and lyrics ==
Allmusic's Rovi told that "an easygoing folk-pop sound dominates, the boys still manage to rock it up a bit on songs like the propulsive title track." At Christianity Today, Russ Breimeier noted that "the more striking difference between Psalms and Carry Away, however, is the polished production. Psalms was just earthy enough and rough around the edges to be appealing." In addition, he wrote that "Carry Away is a slight lyrical departure from the strictly scriptural Psalms." Greg Inglis of Cross Rhythms highlighted that the album features "tight instrumentation, passionate vocals and subtle production make this an album which really stands out from the pile."

== Reception ==
=== Critical ===
Professional ratings
Review scores
Source	Rating
Allmusic	3/5 stars
Christianity Today	4/5 stars
Cross Rhythms	8/10 squares

Carry Away has received mostly positive reviews from the music critics. Rovi of Allmusic told that "unlike some other Christian pop artists, Barnard and Everett don't do anything to disguise their lyrical intentions; every song on CARRY AWAY deals with faith in an earnest and upfront way." At Christianity Today, Russ Breimeier found that "eespite the quiet ending and the increased leanings to pop, Carry Away is a strong worship album of dazzling musicianship and powerful vocalists." Cross Rhythms' Greg Inglis said that the duo "are still relative unknowns but this is sure to change with this release."

=== Commercial ===
For the week of May 3, 2003 music charts by Billboard, Carry Away was on the Billboard 200 national chart at a peak of 149, and the breaking and entering chart selling at the fourth place on the Heatseekers Albums, and it was on the genre charting Christian Albums in the No. 13 slot.

== Track listing ==
All tracks are written by Shane Barnard except where noted.

Tracklist
No.	Title	Writer(s)	Length
1.	"Barren Land"		4:13
2.	"Carry Away"		3:36
3.	"Be Near"		4:24
4.	"Mercy Reigns"		4:03
5.	"Song of Surrender"		4:31
6.	"I Want It All"		3:56
7.	"When I Think About the Lord"	James Huey	3:43
8.	"Beauty for Ashes"	Barnard, Kendall Combs	4:43
9.	"Sweet Illumination"	Barnard, Shane Everett	3:39
10.	"Hearts of Servants"		4:07
11.	"The Blood"		3:42
12.	"Water of the Word"		2:15
13.	"Be Near (Radio Version)"		4:41
Total length:			51:33

== Personnel ==
Shane & Shane

- Shane Everett – lead and backing vocals
- Shane Barnard – lead and backing vocals, acoustic piano, acoustic guitars, percussion, hammered dulcimer

Musicians

- Will Hunt – programming
- Derrick Horne – Hammond B3 organ, bass guitar (1, 2, 4–6, 8–12), electric guitars (5)
- Blair Masters – acoustic piano (3); piano, string and synthesizer arrangements (3)
- Kendall Combes – electric guitars
- Andy Timmons – electric guitars (3, 13)
- George Anderson – bass guitar (3, 13)
- J.P. Mendez – bass guitar (7)
- Joel Cameron – drums (1, 5)
- Craig Weaver – drums (2–4, 6–13)
- Nichole Nordeman – backing vocals (1, 8), acoustic piano (8)

=== Production ===
- Steve Ford – executive producer
- Shane Everett – producer
- Shane Barnard – producer
- Joel Cameron – producer, engineer
- David Thoener – mixing
- Ken Love – mastering at MasterMix (Nashville, Tennessee)
- Shawna Douglas – photography
- benfRank – design, cover artwork

== Charts ==
Chart (2003)	Peak position
US Billboard 200	149
US Christian Albums (Billboard)	13
US Heatseekers Albums (Billboard)	4
