= Clean (Shane & Shane album) =

Studio album by Shane & Shane
- Released: October 19, 2004
- Genre: Contemporary worship
- Length: 43:01
- Label: Inpop
- Producer: Will Hunt

Shane & Shane chronology
Upstairs (2004)	Clean (2004)	An Evening with Shane & Shane (2005)

Clean is the fourth studio album by the contemporary worship duo Shane & Shane. The album was released on October 19, 2004 by Inpop Records label, and the producer on the effort is Will Hunt.

== Music and lyrics ==
Kevan Breitinger of About.com told that the duo "have found a niche with their pitch-perfect blend of dueling acoustic guitars and impassioned vocals, and made it very much their own," which he proclaimed that "nobody does it better." At Christianity Today, Russ Breimeier said that the album "seems to continue a pattern of alternating between rough-around-the-edges acoustic indie pop and a more polished radio-friendly sound", which it "leans toward the latter." This leads to the duo getting "bogged down in boring acoustic balladry." At Cross Rhythms, Tim Holden highlighted that the songs "are delivered with a pleasant acoustic guitar-lead rock feel that occasionally has a bit of a kick to it." Jesus Freak Hideout's Jessica Vander Loop vowed that this is an "arousing worship album."

== Reception ==
=== Critical ===
Professional ratings
Review scores
Source	Rating
About.com	4/5 stars
Christianity Today	3/5 stars
Cross Rhythms	8/10 squares
Jesus Freak Hideout	3.5/5 stars

Clean has received mostly positive reviews from the music critics. About.com's Kevan Breitinger found that "there's a whole lot to like here if you're ready to worship." At Christianity Today, Russ Breimeier told that "perhaps Clean is a little too clean." Tim Holden of Cross Rhythms evoked that "'Clean' is a very good introduction and it will not upset their existing fans either", and it is "worth getting hold of for its lack of trite lyrics and polished sound!" At Jesus Freak Hideout, Jessica Vander Loop highlighted that "duo is growing in more ways than one."

=== Commercial ===
For the Billboard charts of October 30, 2004 week, Clean was the No. 123 album sold in the entire United States by the Billboard 200, which it was on the breaking and entering chart selling at the third place on the Heatseekers Albums, and it was on the genre charting Christian Albums in the fifth slot.

== Track listing ==
Tracklist
No.	Title	Writer(s)	Length
1.	"Saved by Grace"	Shane Barnard	3:51
2.	"Fringes"	Barnard	3:12
3.	"He Is Exalted"	Twila Paris	3:30
4.	"Waging War"	Barnard	4:18
5.	"Make Believe Jesus"	Barnard	3:10
6.	"You and I"	Barnard, Shane Everett	3:10
7.	"Yearn"	Barnard	4:10
8.	"God Did"	Barnard	3:52
9.	"Acres of Hope"	Barnard, Robbie Seay	5:10
10.	"There Is None Like You"	Lenny LeBlanc	3:27
11.	"Your Grace Is Sufficient"	Martin Nystrom	5:11
Total length:			43:01

== Charts ==
Chart (2004)	Peak position
US Billboard 200	123
US Christian Albums (Billboard)	5
US Heatseekers Albums (Billboard)	3
