= Casting Pearls =

Studio album by VOTA
- Released: August 16, 2005
- Recorded: 2004
- Genre: Christian rock
- Length: 35:52
- Label: Big Box, Inpop
- Producer: Jason Burkum, Nathan Dantzler

VOTA chronology
| Rock (2002) | Casting Pearls (2005) | Live in Wichita (2007) |

Professional ratings
Review scores
| Source | Rating |
|---|---|
| About.com | 4/5 stars |
| Christianity Today | 4/5 stars |
| Jesus Freak Hideout | 3.5/5 stars |
| MusicFaith.com | 7/10 stars |

Casting Pearls is the self-titled and label-debut album by the Christian rock band Casting Pearls (now known as VOTA). The album was initially released independently in December 2004 by Big Box Records. It was later re-released nationally as a CD-DVD combo from Inpop Records on August 16, 2005, with a slightly rearranged track listing. The DVD side includes a live concert recording of the band playing with fellow Lincoln, Nebraska, band Remedy Drive and special guest Phil Joel at the Rococo Theatre in Lincoln.

== Additional musicians ==
- Phil Joel - additional background vocals
- Jason Burkum - additional guitar, choir
- Maria Schatz, Tracey Colling, Tonja Rose, Marcy Berkum, Rob Harris, Ken Harrell - "Whole World in His Hands" choir

== Track listing ==
1. Weighted - 3:21
2. Wastin' Time - 3:25
3. Alright - 3:27
4. Whole World in His Hands - 3:37
5. All About Love - 3:04
6. Focus - 5:22
7. Revolution - 3:59
8. Close Your Eyes - 3:15
9. Love's Done Something - 3:17
10. You Alone - 4:25
