= Julian Drive =

- Origin: Athens, Georgia
- Genres: contemporary Christian music, Christian alternative rock
- Years active: 2002–present
- Labels: Daywind, Sidecar, Inpop
- Members: Shane Bowers; Tyler Ivory; David Sosebee
- Website: juliandrive.com

Julian Drive are an American contemporary Christian music and Christian alternative rock band from Athens, Georgia, and they were formed in 2002. Their members are Shane Bowers, Tyler Ivory, & David Sosebee. Their debut album came on the heels of winning the 2004 Exalting Him Talent competition and they released singles, "Famous" and "Any Way the Wind Blows" with Daywind Records. Their follow up,My Coming Day, came with Inpop Records, in 2009. This saw the single album breakthrough on the Billboard magazine charts, and the song, "The Reason", place on the Christian Songs chart. Their single, "From Your Hands" also received favorable reviews.

== Background ==
The contemporary Christian music and Christian alternative rock band formed in Athens, Georgia, in 2002. They count as their members; lead vocalist and guitarist, Shane Bowers, drums/guitars, Tyler Ivory, bassist, David Sosebee.

== Music history ==
The group formed in 2002, with their first major label release studio album, My Coming Day, was released by Inpop Records on January 27, 2009. This album was a Billboard magazine breakthrough release upon the Christian Albums chart at No. 31, while it placed at 38 on the Heatseekers Albums chart. The song, "The Reason", peaked at No. 46 on the Christian Songs chart.

== Past & Current Members ==
Current members

- Shane Bowers – vocals, guitar
- Shaun Bennett – keyboard
- James Nitz – bass
- Jesse Triplett – guitar
- Brian Wilson – drums
- Josh Seagraves - drums
- Tyler Ivory - drums
- David Sosebee - bass

== Discography ==
Studio albums

List of studio albums, with selected chart positions
Title	Album details	Peak chart positions	
Title	Album details	US Christ	US Heat
My Coming Day	Released: January 27, 2009; Label: Inpop; CD, digital download	31	38
