= As Long as We Can Breathe =

Studio album by JJ Weeks Band
- Released: April 8, 2016
- Genres: Worship; Christian pop; Christian rock
- Length: 33:55
- Label: Centricity

JJ Weeks Band chronology
All Over the World (2013)	As Long as We Can Breathe (2016)

As Long as We Can Breathe is the second major label studio album by JJ Weeks Band. Centricity Music released the album on April 8, 2016.

== Critical reception ==
Professional ratings
Review scores
Source	Rating
365 Days of Inspiring Media	4/5 stars
Alpha Omega News	A
CCM Magazine	4/5 stars
The Christian Beat	4.3/5 stars
Cross Rhythms	8/10 squares
Jesus Freak Hideout	2.5/5 stars
Louder Than the Music	4/5 stars
New Release Today	3.5/5 stars
Worship Leader	4.5/5 stars

Andy Argyrakis, signaling in a four star review at CCM Magazine, writes, "Lyrically speaking, the group is wholeheartedly committed to ministry, and regardless if it’s an upbeat powerhouse or towering ballad, Weeks' chilling vocals and the supporting cast's crisp delivery are sure to command attention for these more than deserving veterans." Awarding the album three and a half stars from New Release Today, Jonathan J. Francesco states, "It's not going to reshape the CCM genre, but it will give Christian radio some welcome hits, and that makes it a winner."

Andrew Wallace, indicating in an eight out of ten review by Cross Rhythms, describes, "JJ's vocals shine impressively throughout, confidently covering a range of styles whether rock powerhouse or soft country tinge." Rating the album four and a half stars from Worship Leader, Jay Akins calls, "a powerhouse of a record." Jono Davies, giving the album four stars at Louder Than the Music, writes, "The band have a solid album here that I'm sure will make some great waves in the Christian Music world."

Grading the album an A for Alpha Omega News, Rob Snyder calls, "A pleasing effort" by the band. Lucas Munachen, rating the album two and a half stars by Jesus Freak Hideout, says, "As Long As We Can Breathe is an underwhelming effort from a band that once displayed so much potential." Chris Major, rating the album 4.3 stars out of five from The Christian Beat, writes, "Encouraging, inspiring, joyful, [and] powerful". Signaling in a four star review by 365 Days of Inspiring Media, Joshua Andre states, "As Long As We Can Breathe is definitely going to provide buzz and coverage for the band".

== Track listing ==
No.	Title	Length
1.	"In the Name Of"	3:29
2.	"Jealous"	2:59
3.	"Higher"	3:28
4.	"Alive in Me"	3:16
5.	"Rooftops" (featuring Tedashii)	3:07
6.	"Count Them All"	4:05
7.	"Ahead of Me"	3:13
8.	"Rest Now"	3:45
9.	"You Called My Name"	3:08
10.	"Love Showed Up"	3:25
Total length:		33:55

== Chart performance ==
Chart (2016)	Peak position
US Top Christian Albums (Billboard)	44
