= Glory in the Highest: A Christmas Record =

Studio album by Shane & Shane
- Released: October 14, 2008
- Genres: Contemporary worship, Christmas music
- Length: 35:56
- Label: Inpop
- Producer: Jason Hoard

Shane & Shane chronology
Pages (2007)	Glory in the Highest: A Christmas Record (2008)	Everything Is Different (2009)

Glory in the Highest: A Christmas Record is the first Christmas music by the contemporary worship duo Shane & Shane. The album was released on October 14, 2008 by Inpop Records label, and the producer on the effort is Jason Hoard.

== Music and lyrics ==
Allmusic's Jared Johnson said that the release is in the "traditional folk-pop vein", but found that when they go down "the folksy near-country sound" it "appeals to the group's core fans with a heaping helping of Southern charm and the right intensity at the right moments." At The Christian Manifesto, Calvin E'Jon Moore had one complaint, and that was "at 10 tracks long, the album feels much too short for such a wonderful display of talent." Simon Carpenter wrote that "the music has a jazzy/country/acoustic feel to it which is pleasant but hardly dynamic."

At Indie Vision Music, Eric Pattersson found that "the three original, newly written songs on the record lose some of the charming jazzy/folksy style felt throughout the rest of the record, instead playing a much more straightforward singer/songwriter type sound, but they all work together for a total record that has both variety and flow." Jesus Freak Hideout's Timothy Estabrooks wrote that "Glory In The Highest features a mix of classics and contemporary favorites, all performed in the duo's familiar acoustic/folk style." Curt McLey of The Phantom Tollbooth told that "Glory in the Highest shares with other Shane and Shane efforts is the showy, tight-as-a-fiddle harmony, and breezy, jazz-tinged arrangements", but "That's not to say that this holiday release is like anything close to a jazz album. It's far more eclectic than that, highlighted by forays into pop, relaxed country, and faux rock." Lastly, McLey noted that "the glitterish vocal style of Shane and Shane both attract and detract."

== Critical reception ==
Professional ratings
Review scores
Source	Rating
Allmusic	3.5/5 stars
CCM Magazine	3.5/5 stars
The Christian Manifesto	4.5/5 stars
Cross Rhythms	5/10 squares
Indie Vision Music	7/10 stars
Jesus Freak Hideout	3/5 stars
The Phantom Tollbooth	3.5/5 stars

Glory in the Highest: A Christmas Record has received mostly positive reviews from the music critics. Jared Johnson of Allmusic noted that "it's a bit of a shame that their holiday record doesn't bear more of an impact." At CCM Magazine, Matt Conner found that for a few listeners "the overload on the overdone songs will be a nuisance, but Shane & Shane accommodate well with their special ingredients, spicing up the compilation for a fine acoustic blend." The Christian Manifesto's Calvin E'Jon Moore told that the release "is one of the few Christmas albums that is also a powerful piece of worship. If you’re skeptical about Christmas albums, Shane & Shane should help ally any lingering doubts or fears." At Indie Vision Music, Eric Pattersson felt that "in the distinct absence of punk Christmas compilations this year, perhaps those of us still eager for new tunes to celebrate the holiday will find some satisfaction in Glory in the Highest." The Phantom Tollbooth's Curt McLey affirmed that the album is "striking a balance between sounding fresh, but not so creatively over the line that traditionalists won't listen", and that "Shane and Shane offer up a collection of ten gift-wrapped songs that walk that challenging tightrope; tradition stamped with originality and creativity."

However, Simon Carpenter of Cross Rhythms claimed that "this too predictable Christmas album is unlikely to change the situation." In addition, Jesus Freak Hideout's Timothy Estabrooks found that the effort is "filled primarily with songs that have been heard a hundred times before, listeners will find nothing noteworthy to get excited about", and he called the release "unremarkable."

=== Commercial ===
For the Billboard chart week of October 25, 2008, the album charted at the No. 29 most sold Holiday Albums in the United States.

== Track listing ==
Tracklist
No.	Title	Writer(s)	Length
1.	"O Holy Night"		3:42
2.	"O Come O Come Emmanuel"		4:36
3.	"Away in a Manger"		3:03
4.	"It's Beginning to Look Like Christmas"	Meredith Willson	2:52
5.	"Born to Die"		4:15
6.	"Silent Night"		3:24
7.	"White Christmas"	Irving Berlin	3:24
8.	"Holiday"	Shane Barnard	3:39
9.	"Glory in the Highest"	Barnard, Shane Everett	3:38
10.	"O Come Let Us Adore Him"		2:23
Total length:			35:56

== Charts ==
Chart (2011)	Peak position
US Holiday Albums (Billboard)	29
