= Advisory Council =

Advisory Council may refer to:

- Privy council, a body that advises the head of state of a nation

== United Kingdom ==
- Advisory Council on the Misuse of Drugs
- Pakistan–Britain Advisory Council
- Parliamentary Advisory Council for Transport Safety

== United States ==
- Advisory Council of Faculty Senates
- Advisory Council on Historic Preservation
- Homeland Security Advisory Council
- Presidential Advisory Council on HIV/AIDS
- Recreational Software Advisory Council

== Other countries ==
- Canadian Aviation Regulation Advisory Council
- National Advisory Council, India
- National Unification Advisory Council, South Korea
- Order of Canada advisory council
- Royal Advisory Council for Saharan Affairs, Morocco
- Space Generation Advisory Council, United Nations
- Technical Advisory Council, U.S. Federal Communications Commission
- Advisory Council (Qing dynasty)
