= Rock (Casting Pearls EP) =

EP by Casting Pearls
- Released: November 30, 2002
- Genre: Christian rock
- Label: Big Box Records

Casting Pearls chronology
Really Great Sinners (2000)	Rock (2002)	Casting Pearls (2005)

Rock is an EP by the Christian rock band Casting Pearls.

Track 3, "Wastin' Time" was re-used on their next release, Casting Pearls.

== Track listing ==
1. Stuck
2. Love But Dread
3. Wastin' Time
4. Off The Hook
5. Close Your Eyes
6. Need You Here
7. All About Love
8. August
9. 2 a.m.
