= Only You (Karyn Williams album) =

Studio album by Karyn Williams
- Released: August 28, 2012
- Genre: Contemporary Christian music
- Length: 41:13
- Label: Inpop

Karyn Williams chronology
Wake Up EP (2011)	Only You (2012)

Only You is the first studio album from Karyn Williams. Inpop Records released the album on August 28, 2012.

== Critical reception ==
Professional ratings
Review scores
Source	Rating
AllMusic	3.5/5 stars
CCM Magazine	3/5 stars
CM Addict	4.5/5 stars
Cross Rhythms	9/10 squares
Indie Vision Music	4/5 stars
Jesus Freak Hideout	3/5 stars
Louder Than the Music	3.5/5 stars
New Release Tuesday	4/5 stars
The Phantom Tollbooth	3.5/5
Worship Leader	3.5/5 stars

Awarding the album three and a half stars from AllMusic, James Christopher Monger states, "Only You, ... busts out of the gate with some real horsepower before settling into a more comfortable, country-infused, AOR folk-pop gait." Grace S. Aspinwall, indicating in a three star review for CCM Magazine, says, "Her strong vocal and songwriting carry her debut to soaring heights." Signaling in a three and a half star review at Worship Leader, Barry Westman describes, "Karyn Williams enters the music scene with an 11-song collection of original compositions and co-writes that highlight her dynamic soprano voice." Tim Holden, giving the album a nine out of ten for Cross Rhythms, writes, Williams "manages to find a sound of her own. It's built round her smooth, almost vulnerable, vocals delivering strong lyrics that are firmly anchored in her faith." Rating the album four stars at New Release Tuesday, Kevin Davis describes it as a "stirring album".

Roger Gelwicks, signaling in a three star review by Jesus Freak Hideout, says, "Only You may not be the most worthwhile release, but when Williams picks her niche and fully develops her take on it, her talent will surely shine through." Jonathan Andre, rating the album four stars at Indie Vision Music, writes, "Well done Karyn for such a satisfying musical experience!" Awarding the album four and a half stars for CM Addict, Grace Thorson states, "'Only You' by Karyn Williams breaks through with incredible force". Michael Dalton, giving the album a 3.5 out of five review from The Phantom Tollbooth, describes, "There is much in the way of comfort and encouragement to be found as Williams consistently presents God as the answer to our great need." Specifying in a three and a half star review by Louder Than the Music, Jono Davies says, "If you like this genre of music then please check this out, the quality of the overall album is very solid indeed."

== Track listing ==
No.	Title	Length
1.	"Call"	3:23
2.	"Every Good Thing"	3:07
3.	"Rest in the Hope"	3:57
4.	"Just May Be"	3:22
5.	"Banner"	3:38
6.	"Waiting in the Rain"	4:35
7.	"Hey There"	3:59
8.	"Possible"	3:19
9.	"Enough for Me"	3:34
10.	"This Is Freedom"	4:11
11.	"Only You"	4:08
Total length:		41:13
