= The Worship Initiative =

Studio album by Shane & Shane
- Released: April 28, 2015
- Genre: Contemporary worship
- Length: 54:16
- Label: Fair Trade

Shane & Shane chronology
Bring Your Nothing (2013)	The Worship Initiative (2015)	Psalms II (2015)

The Worship Initiative is the ninth studio album by Shane & Shane, released on April 28, 2015 through Fair Trade Services. The album was funded via a Kickstarter project.

== Critical reception ==
Professional ratings
Review scores
Source	Rating
365 Days of Inspiring Media	4/5 stars
CCM Magazine	3/5 stars
Christian Music Review	4.7/5
Jesus Freak Hideout	3.5/5 stars
New Release Tuesday	4.5/5 stars
Worship Leader	4/5 stars

Grace S. Aspinwall, awarding the album three stars at CCM Magazine, writes, "Delivering a set of worship favorites can be tricky, as some will revert to favoring the original writer/performer. Shane and Shane, in their own way, cover this chosen batch with ease." In a three and a half star review by Jesus Freak Hideout, Christopher Smith describes, "If the intention of The Worship Initiative was to simplify these songs to make them easier for a worship team to reproduce, then the duo accomplished this without sacrificing too much creativity." Kevin Davis, writing in a four and a half star review from New Release Tuesday, replies, "the songs get deeper into the recesses of your heart with the challenging messages." In a 4.7 out of five rated review at Christian Music Review, Kelly Meade says, "From start to finish, this album is full of well written, reflective lyrics calling our hearts to worship." Joshua Andre, awarding the album four stars for 365 Days of Inspiring Media, writes, "A thoroughly enjoyable worship album, Shane & Shane's The Worship Initiative is one to enjoy if you want to hear a worship album full of recognizable old and new favourites." In a four star review from Worship Leader, Jeremy Armstrong says, "plied with the Shane & Shane artistry full of soaring melodies, pristine guitar work, and emotive musicality, these songs are given new breath with this outstanding collection."

== Track listing ==
No.	Title	Length
1.	"God of Ages Past"	4:25
2.	"Seas of Crimson"	5:01
3.	"This I Believe"	4:12
4.	"Scandal of Grace"	3:55
5.	"Forever"	4:43
6.	"Jesus Loves Me"	3:35
7.	"Christ Be All Around Me"	5:33
8.	"You Make Me Brave"	5:13
9.	"Great Are You Lord"	3:57
10.	"Man of Sorrows"	5:11
11.	"So I Can Love" (Radio Version)	3:58
12.	"All the Poor and Powerless" (Radio Version)	4:12
Total length:		54:16

== Charts ==
Chart (2015)	Peak position
US Christian Albums (Billboard)	14
