= The One You Need =

Studio album by Shane & Shane
- Released: October 4, 2011
- Genre: Contemporary worship
- Length: 51:56
- Label: Fair Trade Services
- Producers: Shane & Shane

Shane & Shane chronology
Everything Is Different (2009)	The One You Need (2011)	Bring Your Nothing (2013)

The One You Need is the seventh studio album by the contemporary worship duo Shane & Shane. The album was released on October 4, 2011, by Fair Trade Services record label.

== Music and lyrics ==
Jared Johnson of Allmusic told that old fans will "particularly appreciate how their sound has evolved without neglecting its trademark acoustic folk nuances.", and that the band "sound more personable and full of rich songwriting than ever." At Alpha Omega News, Tom Frigoli found that the duos' "voices blend perfectly through tight harmonies echoing those of Rascal Flatts", which is because "their fresh vocals and heartfelt lyrics bring a catchy, enjoyable worship album that hits home." Joel Oliphint of Christianity Today claimed that the release "is far closer to epic, chorus-driven worship rock than Dave Matthews dorm-rock." Cross Rhythms' Tim Holden affirmed that "their brand of acoustic guitar-based rock is filled out nicely with a strong band and full use is made of their many talents throughout the album."

Indie Vision Music's Cimarron Hatch contended that she "felt that the vocals are overly breathy, and over-sung." Jesus Freak Hideout's Alex "Tincan" Caldwell wrote that it is "a smooth, yet soulful and heartfelt" release from the duo. At New Release Tuesday, Jonathan Francesco highlighted that "Shane and Shane don’t try to wow listeners with a big sound" which is because "their music is more subtle and intimate", and at times "that often leaves the music sounding a bit forgettable, when the truly golden moments are struck, they are all the more meaningful as a result of this soothing and striped down sound." At Oncourse, Shannon Zabroski stated that the duo has "distinct vocal harmonies are about as faultless as God will allow this side of Heaven", and that the duo "possess the paradox of an 'intense sensitivity,' which is the fruit of a true Spirit-led heart for worship."

Dawn Teresa of New Release Tuesday called it a "scripture-soaked record full of the good news of the Gospel", and found the album to be "musically diverse, there are many styles present and sometimes blended: pop/rock, jazz, folk, worship, and gospel", which "the songs may not all grab you immediately--they aren't short, catchy pop tunes--and some may be better suited to corporate worship and personal listening than radio." The Phantom Tollbooth's Larry Stephan seconded Teresa, when he noticed that the album "contains quite a mix of styles but the overall feel is pop-oriented, not that there is anything wrong with that. It’s a matter of taste." However, Michael Wildes found that outside of a few songs that "the style of musical doesn’t change nor does the variation in singing. It wouldn’t be right to call it unbearable to the end but the sound is oh so familiar. The good thing-or the thing that saves this album- is that the songs are short, which, is not a bad thing in this case."

== Reception ==
=== Critical ===
Professional ratings
Review scores
Source	Rating
Allmusic	4/5 stars
Alpha Omega News	A
CCM Magazine	4/5 stars
The Christian Manifesto	4/5 stars
Christianity Today	2/5 stars
Cross Rhythms	9/10 squares
Indie Vision Music	2/5 stars
Jesus Freak Hideout	3.5/5 stars
New Release Tuesday	3.5/5 stars 4.5/5 stars
Oncourse	5/5 stars
The Phantom Tollbooth	3.5/5 stars

The One You Need has received generally positive reviews from the music critics. At Allmusic, Jared Johnson evoked how the album has "that resuming-where-we-left-off feel that we all know, picking up like a conversation with an old friend." Tom Frigoli of Alpha Omega News stated that the release comes "with a smooth, worshipful album that shines", and that it is a "killer album" on which "Shane & Shane have never sounded better!" At CCM Magazine, Andrew Greer found that the duo "continue their trend of recording scripture imbued, four-minute acoustic pop gems." The Christian Manifesto's Michael Wildes proclaimed that the duo "are back with another convincing worship record." Tim Holden of Cross Rhythms affirmed that the release contains "some inventive arrangements and the strong, if sometimes rather breathy, vocals resulting in a well rounded album."

At Jesus Freak Hideout, Alex "Tincan" Caldwell called it "a fine and sincere effort by a band who knows their audience well." Jonathan Francesco of New Release Tuesday stated that the release "may not be the album a listener looking for songs to get stuck in their head for weeks on end needs, but it might just be what those after a more relaxing and introspective listen, one that probes through some different areas in our Christian faith from celebrating our joy in Christ to humble praising of him, are looking for." Also of New Release Tuesday, Dawn Teresa reflected that "upon repeated listening, these songs get under your skin", which the listener will "find the record is worth many listens." Shannon Zabroski of Oncourse told that "these two [are] back in full-album form," which this is because "they are a rare duo that brings a distinct flavor of worship in a sea of sound-alike groups." At The Phantom Tollbooth, Larry Stephan said that "it may have served the record better to pull back on the throttle in places."

At Christianity Today, Joel Oliphint claimed that "the songwriting is so formulaic that the songs run together", which leads "to singable yet unmemorable, overdramatic refrains." Cimarron Hatch of Indie Vision Music wrote that even though she "felt that a lot of the lyrics were clichéd, things that have been sung a million times, but that does not necessarily mean that the content is lacking, which it is not."

=== Commercial ===
For the charts the week of October 15, 2011, The One You Need was the No. 57 most sold album in the entirety of the United States by the Billboard 200, and was the fourth most sold Christian Albums.

== Track listing ==
All tracks are written by Shane Barnard except on the following.

Tracklist
No.	Title	Writer(s)	Length
1.	"Liberty"		5:32
2.	"Your Love"		4:30
3.	"Without You"		3:53
4.	"Future Version"	Shane Barnard, Shane Everett, Jimmy Needham	4:13
5.	"Because He's God"		4:41
6.	"The One You Need"	Barnard, Everett, Jason Ingram	3:56
7.	"Miracle"		3:18
8.	"Victory"		4:04
9.	"Running to You"	Barnard, Everett, Ingram	3:44
10.	"Grace Is Sufficient"		4:02
11.	"Lift Up the Light"		5:43
12.	"Praise Him"		4:20
Total length:			51:56

Deluxe
No.	Title	Length
13.	"Because He's God (Acoustic)"	4:53
14.	"Liberty (Acoustic)"	5:25
15.	"Without You (Acoustic)"	3:53
16.	"Your Love (Acoustic)"	4:27
Total length:		70:26

== Charts ==
Chart (2011)	Peak position
US Billboard 200	57
US Top Christian Albums (Billboard)	4
US Digital Albums (Billboard)	20
