= Technical Advisory Council =

Technical Advisory Council (TAC)
Committee overview
- Formed: April 17, 2003
- Committee executive: Dr. Robert Lucky, First chairman
- Parent Commission: Federal Communications Commission
- Website: Official website

The Technical Advisory Council (TAC) is a federal advisory committee of the Federal Communications Commission and the FCC's Office of Engineering and Technology (OET). Its mandate is to provide the FCC with technical advice in such rapidly growing fields as cable television, telephony, and the Internet.

== History ==
TAC held its first meeting on April 17, 2003, under the leadership of TAC Chairman Dr. Robert Lucky, a former Bell Labs researcher.

== Members ==
TAC is primarily composed of representatives from major American telecommunications and media corporations. The current committee, TAC IV, was created on November 19, 2004, and has members from such companies as Cisco, Sprint, Motorola, Google, Comcast, Microsoft, HP, Verizon, Qualcomm, Fox, Bellsouth, and Apple Computer.

Vint Cerf, the co-creator of the Internet protocol TCP/IP, has served on several instances of the committee.
