= Fusebox (band) =

Former American contemporary Christian music band from Atlanta and Nashville

- Origin: Atlanta, Georgia; Nashville, Tennessee
- Genres: Contemporary Christian music, Christian rock, worship
- Years active: 2000–2006
- Labels: Elevate, Inpop
- Past members: Billy Buchanan; Tim Braisted; Steve Conrad; Brad Duncan; Nash Overstreet; Guy Roberts; Reggie Terrell

Fusebox was an American contemporary Christian music band from Atlanta, Georgia and Nashville, Tennessee. They were formed in 2000 and disbanded in 2006. The frontman of the band was Billy Buchanan. They released, Lost in Worship, with Inpop Records and Elevate Records, in 2002. Through the same label, they released Once Again in 2004, and saw the single, "Once Again", placed on the Billboard Christian Songs chart.

== Background ==
The contemporary Christian music and Christian rock band formed in Atlanta, Georgia and Nashville, Tennessee, in 2000. They count as their members, lead vocalist and bass guitarist, Billy Buchanan, guitarists, Brad Duncan, Nash Overstreet, Tim Braisted and Reggie Terrell (also on keys), bass guitarists, Steve Conrad and Tim Braisted, and drummer and background vocalist, Guy Roberts. The group disbanded in 2006, after they released two albums, and those were with Elevate Records and Inpop Records.

== Music history ==
The group formed in 2000 with their first major label release studio album, Lost in Worship, by Inpop Records and Elevate Records, which released on February 26, 2002. Their second album with the aforementioned labels, Once Again, released on June 15, 2004. The single, "Once Again", charted on the Billboard magazine Christian Songs chart at No. 32.

== Members ==
Members

- Billy Buchanan – lead vocals, bass, acoustics
- Guy Roberts – drums, background vocals
- Tim Braisted – guitar, bass
- Reggie Terrell – keys, guitar
- Nash Overstreet – guitar
- Brad Duncan – guitar
- Steve Conrad – bass
- Justin Mackey - guitar, background vocals
- Ben Rodriguez - guitar

== Discography ==
Studio albums

- Lost in Worship (February 26, 2002, Elevate/Inpop)
- Once Again (June 15, 2004, Elevate/Inpop)

EPs

- The Modern Worship EP (2001, Independent)
- The Modern Worship EP (2005, Independent)
