= Patrick Nuo =

Swiss singer (born 1982)

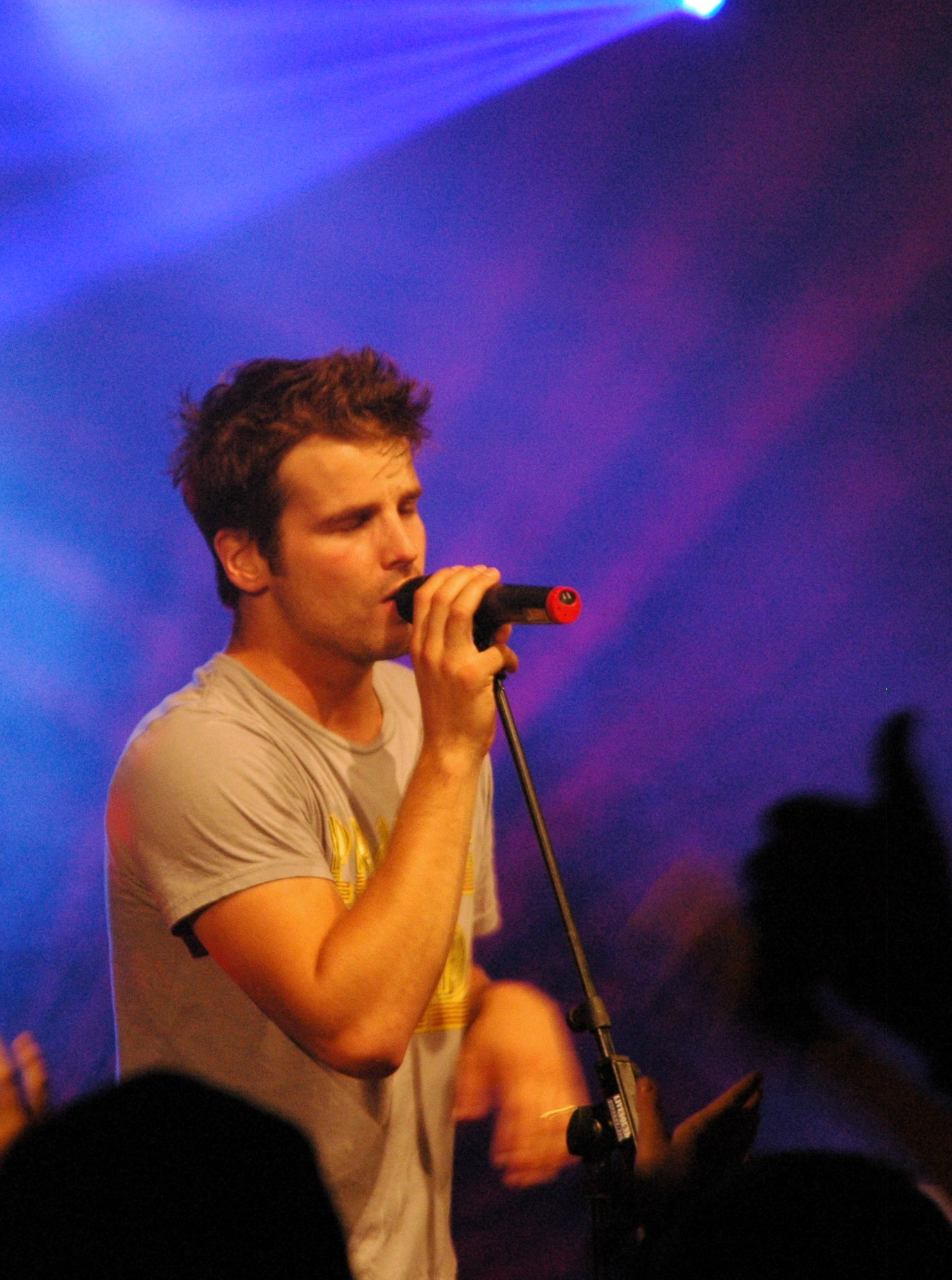
- Nuo in 2007

Background information
- Born: 31 August 1982 (age 43); Lucerne, Switzerland
- Genres: Pop, pop rock
- Years active: 2003–present
- Labels: Warner Music, Sony BMG

Patrick Nuo (born 31 August 1982) is a Swiss singer.

== Early life ==
Nuo was born and raised in Lucerne, Switzerland, where he lived until he was 17. His mother is Swiss and his father is an ethnic Albanian from Kosovo. He has a younger brother, Simon. At the age of 14, Nuo abandoned all hope of becoming a popular tennis pro and decided to focus on a musical career instead. After a few misleading steps at home, he managed to move to Hamburg, Germany, where he was engaged as a backing vocalist for several record productions. In the meantime he also worked as a model for charity projects. His final home of residence for many years now is Los Angeles, California.

== Career ==
In 2002, Patrick met producer and songwriter David Jost, who helped Nuo sign a contract with Warner Music. In the following months, the duo created a whole album together, which was eventually released under the name Welcome in September 2003. A top 20 chart success in Switzerland and Germany, it spawned three singles; including debut single "5 Days" and follow-up "Reanimate", which reached number 18 on the Swiss Singles Chart.

That same year, Nuo joined Zeichen der Zeit, a Christian music project whose first single "Du bist nicht allein" became a top ten success in Germany. A second single released from the project's self-titled compilation album, "Ein weiterer Morgen", entered the top 40 of the German Singles Chart the following year. Also in 2004, a reissue of Welcome was released. It spawned the single "Undone", which served as the theme song for American comedy film Scooby-Doo 2: Monsters Unleashed (2004) in German-speaking Europe.

In May 2005, Nuo's second album Superglue was released. While not as commercially successful as Welcome in Germany, it would eventually become his highest-charting to date, reaching number four on the Swiss Albums Chart. Two singles were released from Superglue: "Girl in the Moon" and "Beautiful", the latter of which became his first and only top ten hit to date. The song peaked at number nine and number seven in Switzerland and Austria respectively. In 2006, Nuo reteamed with Zeichen der Zeit to produce their second album Generation David (2006), and participated in another non-profit aid project when he provided vocals for the Fury in the Slaughterhouse cover, charity single "Won't Forget These Days", released during the 2006 FIFA World Cup.

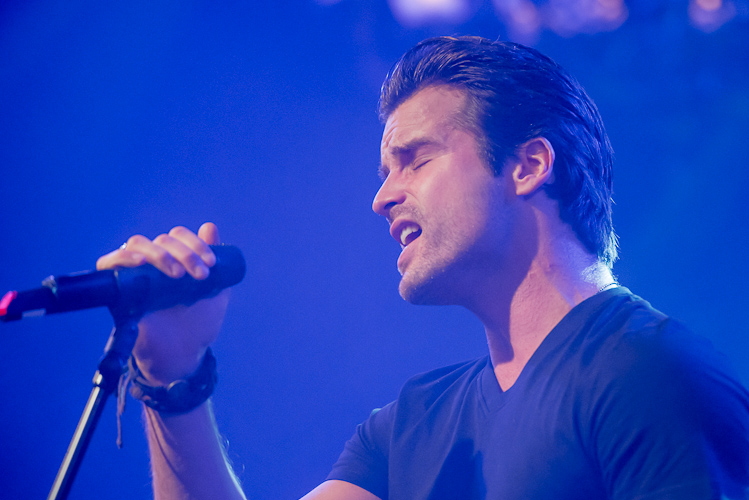
Nuo performing in 2012

In 2007, after a label change to Ariola Records, Nuo's third album Nuo was released. It widely failed to match the success of his previous studio albums and produced three singles of which lead single "Watchin' Over You" became the only single to chart. In September 2009, the single "Come On Now" was released on Flash Records.

In 2011, Nuo became a member of the jury in the German Idol series show Deutschland sucht den Superstar alongside producer Dieter Bohlen and singer Fernanda Brandão. In 2013, he was one out of eleven celebrities who joined the seventh season of Ich bin ein Star – Holt mich hier raus! based on the British reality television show I'm a Celebrity...Get Me Out of Here!. He finished fifth.

== Discography ==
=== Studio ===
- Welcome (2003)
- Superglue (2005)
- Nuo (2007)

== Filmography ==
=== Film ===
- 2009: The Fury
- 2012: Das Traumhotel – Brasilien (TV)
- 2012: Crescendo (short movie)
- 2012: Tim Sander goes to Hollywood

=== TV ===
- 2006: Lotta in Love
- 2011: Deutschland sucht den Superstar (season 8, member of the jury)
- 2013: Der VIP-Bus – Promis auf Pauschalreise
- 2013: Ich bin ein Star – Holt mich hier raus!
