= The Advice =

American contemporary Christian music band

- Also known as: Jethro's Advice (formerly)
- Origin: Greenville, South Carolina
- Genres: Contemporary Christian music, soul
- Years active: 2003–present
- Labels: Inpop
- Members: Matt Houston; Jared Houston; Aaron Bowen; Sanchez Fair; Jeff Madden
- Past members: Justin Gilreath
- Website: theadviceband.com

The Advice (formerly known as, Jethro's Advice) are an American contemporary Christian music band from Greenville, South Carolina, and they were formed in 2003. Their members are Matt Houston, Jared Houston, Aaron Bowen, Sanchez Fair, and Jeff Madden. They released, The Advice, with Inpop Records in 2013.

== Background ==
The band formed in Greenville, South Carolina, in 2003. Their members are leading vocalist and rhythm guitarist, Matt Houston, leading guitarist, Jared Houston, keyboardist, Aaron Bowen, drummer, Sanchez Fair, and bass guitarist, Jeff Madden, where the members are background vocalists to their lead vocalist. They had, Justin Gilreath, as their rhythm guitar player, but he left the band in 2007. The band were called, Jethro's Advice, until they got a record deal with Inpop Records, causing them to change their names to The Advice.

== Music history ==
The group formed in 2003, with their first major label extended play, The Advice, releasing on July 26, 2011, by Inpop Records. This EP was reviewed by Cross Rhythms, Jesus Freak Hideout, Louder Than the Music, and New Release Tuesday. Their first major label studio album, The Advice, releasing on March 26, 2013, by Inpop Records. This album was reviewed by BREATHEcast, Indie Vision Music, Jesus Freak Hideout, and New Release Tuesday.

== Members ==
Current members

- Matt Houston – lead vocalist, rhythm guitarist
- Jared Houston – lead guitarist, background vocalist
- Aaron Bowen – keyboardist, background vocalist
- Sanchez Fair – drummer, background vocalist
- Jeff Madden – bass guitarist, background vocalist

Former members

- Justin Gilreath – guitarist

== Discography ==
Studio albums

- The Advice (March 26, 2013, Inpop)

EPs

- The Advice EP (July 26, 2011, Inpop)
