= Zeichen der Zeit =

German pop music band

Zeichen der Zeit ("Sign of the Times") was a music project by various German pop musicians. Their common goal was to express their Christian belief and to make an issue out of it in the secular media. An album of the same title appeared in 2004, and the song "Du bist nicht allein" ("You Are Not Alone") became a substantial hit. The project continued in 2006 with the second album "David Generation", which has fewer contributors in order to give it a more distinct sound.

== Members ==
- Yvonne Catterfeld
- Ben
- Patrick Nuo
- Rolf Stahlhofen
- Xavier Naidoo
- Cassandra Steen
- Laith Al-Deen
- Claus Eisenmann (Söhne Mannheims)
- Paddy Kelly
- Judy Bailey
- Sarah Brendel
- Claas P. Jambor
- Michael Janz (Beatbetrieb)
- DannyFresh (W4C)
- Mischa Marin (Allee der Kosmonauten)
