= Welcome (Patrick Nuo album) =

Studio album by Patrick Nuo
- Released: September 4, 2003
- Genre: Pop, pop rock
- Length: 62:29
- Label: Warner Music

Patrick Nuo chronology
Welcome (2003)	Superglue (2005)

Welcome is the debut studio album by Swiss recording artist Patrick Nuo. It was released by Warner Music on September 4, 2003 in German-speaking Europe and reached the top twenty of the German and Swiss Albums Charts.

== Track listing ==
No.	Title	Writer(s)	Producer(s)	Length
1.	"5 Days"	David Jost, Dave Roth	Jost, Roth, Christian Fleps	3:25
2.	"Be Careful Not to Be Too Careful"	Jost, Stefan Oliver Knoess	Jost, Fleps, Knoess	3:02
3.	"Welcome (To My little Island)"	Jost, Alexander Zuckowski	Jost, Fleps	3:52
4.	"Reanimate"	Jost, Roth	Jost, Roth, Fleps	3:12
5.	"The Air That I Breathe"	Jost, Roth	Jost, Roth	3:34
6.	"Crazy"	Jost, Nissim Mizrahi	Jost, Fleps	4:04
7.	"This Ain't Over"	Jost, Roth, Patrick Nuo	Jost, Roth	3:16
8.	"Rainbow Love"	Jost, Zuckowski	Jost, Fleps, Zuckowski	3:23
9.	"Here We Come Again"	Jost, Malte Hagemeister	Jost, Fleps, Hagemeister	3:52
10.	"I Can't Tell"	Jost, Sebastian Graalfs, O'Brien-Docker	Jost, Ian O'Brien-Docker	3:29
11.	"I Believe"	Jost, Mizrahi, Nuo	Jost, Mizrahi, Hendrik Ellers, Mirko Michalzik, Stani "Silence" Djukanovic	4:40
12.	"Unknown Girl"	Jost, Roth, Nuo	Jost, Roth	3:54
13.	"Gone"	Jost, Dexters	Jost, Matt Dexter, Syndicate	3:56
14.	"To Be Continued..."	Jost, Zuckowski	Jost, Zuckowski	3:56

== Charts ==
Chart (2003)	Peak position
Austrian Albums (Ö3 Austria)	72
German Albums (Offizielle Top 100)	13
Swiss Albums (Schweizer Hitparade)	11
