= Bring Your Nothing =

Studio album by Shane & Shane
- Released: May 14, 2013
- Genre: Contemporary worship
- Length: 42:02
- Label: Fair Trade Services

Shane & Shane chronology
The One You Need (2011)	Bring Your Nothing (2013)	The Worship Initiative (2015)

Bring Your Nothing is the eighth studio album by the Contemporary worship duo Shane & Shane. The album was released on May 14, 2013 by Fair Trade Services record label.

== Critical reception ==
Professional ratings
Review scores
Source	Rating
Alpha Omega News	B
CCM Magazine	3/5 stars
The Christian Manifesto	3/5 stars
Christian Music Review	4.6/5
Christian Music Zine	4.25/5
Cross Rhythms	9/10 squares
Indie Vision Music	3/5 stars
Jesus Freak Hideout	2.5/5 stars 3/5 stars
Louder Than the Music	4.5/5 stars
New Release Tuesday	4/5 stars
The Phantom Tollbooth	3/5 stars
Worship Leader	4.5/5 stars

Bring Your Nothing has received mostly positive ratings and reviews from the Christian music critics. At Alpha Omega News, Ken Wiegman wrote that he "was impressed with what seems like a new direction instrumentally for the songwriting duo".

Daniel Edgeman of Christian Music Review called the release a "great blend of message and music" that is "very simple, smooth and very powerful", and found that "Shane and Shane bring way more than nothing!" Writing for Christian Music Zine, Joshua Andre felt that the album "does not disappoint" and noted that the release "will change you life" because it is a "gem". Tony Cummings of Cross Rhythms found the "album well worth tracking down." Louder Than the Music's Jono Davies stated that the release "sounds powerful and rich in tone, yet not over produced." Kevin Davies of New Release Tuesday called this "one of the most worshipful, challenging and introspective albums". At Worship Leader, Barry Westman told that "Shane and Shane, along with 5 other friends, recorded these tunes simultaneously all in one room. This unique recording method resulted in a very organic, cohesive feel to the album."

At The Christian Manifesto, Calvin E'Jon Moore noted that the duo "has presented listeners with a decent batch of new songs" that he contended "isn't as spectacular or moving as the songs on Clean or Psalms". Jonathan Andre of Indie Vision Music called the album "thought-provoking and encouraging". At Jesus Freak Hideout, Alex "Tincan" Caldwell alluded to how the album's "ping-ponging sounds and styles" makes the release feel "jarring and confusing." Also, Bert Gangl of Jesus Freak Hideout stated that the album "offers just enough top-drawer material to keep the most-devoted members of the existing fan base fully engaged." At CCM Magazine, Grace S. Aspinwall felt that "Shane and Shane certainly bring more than nothing on this release, although the vast array of styles lends an identity crisis of sorts." Derek Walker of The Phantom Tollbooth said that "this will doubtless please their longtime fans and win them respect from others."

== Commercial performance ==
For the week of June 1, 2013, Bring Your Nothing was the 68th most sold album in the United States according to the Billboard 200, and was the third most sold Christian album.

== Track listing ==
Tracklist
No.	Title	Length
1.	"The One You'll Find"	4:04
2.	"Bring Your Nothing"	3:55
3.	"That's How You Forgive"	3:09
4.	"I Came Alive"	3:32
5.	"You Loved My Heart to Death"	4:31
6.	"Eyes on You"	3:35
7.	"In A Little While"	4:18
8.	"Crucify Him"	3:49
9.	"Without Jesus"	2:51
10.	"Faith to Believe"	3:40
11.	"Though You Slay Me"	4:38
Total length:		42:02

== Charts ==
Chart (2013)	Peak position
US Billboard 200	68
US Top Christian Albums (Billboard)	3
