= Karyn Williams =

- Also known as: Karyn White
- Born: Karyn Kristyne Williams; July 28, 1979 (age 47); Winter Park, Florida
- Origin: Nashville, Tennessee
- Genres: Contemporary Christian music
- Occupations: Singer, songwriter
- Instrument: vocals
- Years active: 2009–present
- Label: Inpop
- Website: karynwilliams.com

Karyn Kristyne Williams-White (born July 28, 1979), is an American Christian musician. She released an extended play, Wake Up, in 2011. Her first album, Only You, was released by Inpop Records in 2012, along with a re-release of the same album in 2013.

== Early life ==
Williams-White was born on July 28, 1979, in Winter Park, Florida, as Karyn Kristyne Williams, whose father is Pat Williams, and whose mother is Jill Williams. She has three other biological siblings and fourteen adopted siblings. Williams-White earned her bachelor's degree from the University of Florida majoring in broadcast journalism. She relocated to Nashville, Tennessee, in 2007, to pursue her music career.

== Music career ==
Her music recording career commenced in 2009, with the release of two singles, "Taking You with Me" and "Rejoice", and those both released in 2010, but were recorded in 2009. Her first extended play, "Wake Up", was released independently in 2011. She released, Only You, on August 28, 2012, with Inpop Records. This album saw two of its singles place on the Christian Songs chart, "Rest in the Hope", peaked at No. 43, while, "Hey There", peaked at No. 46. She released, Letting Go of Perfect, on October 20, 2015, with Redline Entertainment.

== Personal life ==
She is married to Brian White, a music producer and songwriter, and together they reside in Nashville, Tennessee.

== Discography ==
Studio albums

- Only You (August 28, 2012, Inpop)

EPs

- Wake Up (2011, Independent)
