= Psalms (Shane & Shane album) =

Studio album by Shane & Shane
- Released: June 4, 2002
- Genre: Contemporary worship
- Length: 56:23
- Label: Inpop
- Producers: Shane & Shane

Shane & Shane chronology
Psalms (2002)	Carry Away (2003)

Psalms is the first studio album by contemporary worship duo Shane & Shane. The album was released independently in 2000, and re-released on June 4, 2002 by Inpop Records, and was self-produced.

== Music and Lyrics ==
Russ Breimeier of Christianity Today wrote, "if there's one word that leaps to mind when listening to Psalms, it's rhythmic," noting the "superb team of musicians, highlighted by an awesome rhythm section", and additionally praising the vocals, guitar work, and songwriting.

== Critical reception ==
Professional ratings
Review scores
Source	Rating
Christianity Today	4.5/5 stars

Psalms has received one review, and that one was positive. At Christianity Today, Russ Breimeier said that "Psalms is superb, a worship album truly outside the box that showcases smart songwriting and sublime musicianship all for the sake of connecting listeners with the Lord."

== Commercial Performance ==
For the week of June 15, 2002 music charts by Billboard, Psalms was on the genre charting Christian Albums in the No. 11 slot.

== Track listing ==
Psalms
No.	Title	Length
1.	"Breath of God"	4:01
2.	"Unto You"	4:53
3.	"Revive Me (Psalm 143)"	6:07
4.	"The Answer"	4:43
5.	"Psalm 13"	3:49
6.	"Psalm 145"	5:56
7.	"Waiting Room"	4:16
8.	"Job 19"	3:41
9.	"This Is the Day (Psalm 118)"	3:10
10.	"Praise the Name of Jesus"	2:58
11.	"We've Come to Declare"	4:42
12.	"You Said"	4:54
13.	"Hosea"	3:13
Total length:		56:23

== Track Listing ==
Psalms (Original 2000 Independent Release)
No.	Title	Length
1.	"Unto You"
2.	"Waiting Room"
3.	"Psalm 13"
4.	"Psalm 143 (Revive Me)"
5.	"Psalm 145"
6.	"Psalm 118 (This Is The Day)"
7.	"Name's Sake"
8.	"Hosea"
9.	"Praise the Name of Jesus"
10.	"We've Come to Declare"
11.	"May The Words Of My Mouth"
12.	"You Said"

== Charts ==
Chart (2002)	Peak position
US Top Christian Albums (Billboard)	11
