= Shane & Shane =

American Christian worship band

- Origin: Dallas, Texas, United States
- Genre: Contemporary worship music
- Years active: 2001–present
- Labels: Inpop; Fair Trade
- Members: Shane Barnard; Shane Everett

Shane & Shane is a Texas-based contemporary worship music band known for acoustic praise and worship music. The band consists of Shane Barnard (vocals, acoustic guitar) and Shane Everett (vocals). They are often joined by their drummer and manager, Joey Parish.

== Background ==
=== Shane Barnard ===
Barnard was born on January 14, 1976 in Placerville, California, but grew up in Lubbock, Texas & Rockwall, Texas, a 1994 graduate of Rockwall High School. He attended Texas Tech University and later Texas A&M University. It was there that he led worship at the popular Christian student gathering Breakaway, and where he met Everett. Barnard is also known for his unique style of strumming the acoustic guitar and his high vocal range.

During his junior year as a student at Texas A&M University, Barnard began a recording career. Prior to joining Everett, Barnard teamed up with friend Caleb Carruth to release an album. Entitled Salvation Still Remains, it was released in limited numbers. Barnard and Carruth later agreed to end their partnership amicably, stating that they "were just moving in different directions."

Barnard is married to fellow CCM artist Bethany Dillon.

=== Shane Everett ===
Everett was born on July 30, 1974 in Dallas, Texas. He attended Texas A&M University. One night after playing with his band in a bar, Everett felt moved by God, which led him to quit his band and start attending church regularly. Shortly thereafter, he met Barnard, and became part of Breakaway Ministries, a weekly student-led praise and worship service at Texas A&M.

=== Band ===
The band originally began with Barnard performing solo acts, but Everett increasingly played a major role in his performances. In 2002, the band released their first album, Psalms, under the new name "Shane & Shane". The duo continued to release albums in the following years, including Carry Away (2003), Upstairs (2004), and Clean (2004). The duo went on hiatus for a year after the release of An Evening With Shane & Shane, a live CD/DVD. Following the hiatus, the group released five albums in the next six years, including The One You Need (2011), which charted at No. 53 on the Billboard 200, making it their highest-charting album. The One You Need was also the first album released under the Fair Trade record label.

In 2014, following a successful Kickstarter campaign, Shane & Shane launched a project called "The Worship Initiative", a paid membership website with instructional videos and chord charts for popular worship songs. As part of the project, they have released multiple albums including two Christmas albums. Their subsequent studio albums—The Worship Initiative and Psalms II—are also included in the project.

== Discography ==
=== As Shane & Shane ===
- Psalms (2002)
- Carry Away (2003)
- Upstairs (2004)
- Clean (2004)
- Pages (2007)
- Glory in the Highest: A Christmas Record (2008)
- Everything Is Different (2009)
- The One You Need (2011)
- Bring Your Nothing (2013)
- The Worship Initiative (2015)
- Psalms II (2015)
- Hymns, Vol. 1 (2019)
- Hymns, Vol. 2 (2019)
- Hymns in the Round (2020)
- Vintage (2020)
- Psalms, Hymns, and Spiritual Songs, Vol. 1 (2021)

=== As featured artist ===
- Bluegrass Sampler (featuring Peasall Sisters) (2006)
- B Collision (2006) by David Crowder Band: "Be Lifted (Live)" and "I Saw the Light (Live)"
- Dare 2 Share - Unending Worship (2010)
- Blacklight (2011) by Tedashii: "Finally"

=== Individual ===
- Salvation Still Remains (1998) – Shane Barnard & Caleb Carruth
- Rocks Won't Cry (1998) – Shane Barnard (independent)
- Psalms (2001) – Shane Barnard (independent)
- Window to the Inner Court (2001) – Shane Everett
