= Psalms II (album) =

Studio album by Shane & Shane
- Released: October 23, 2015
- Genre: Worship, Christian alternative rock, folk, folk rock
- Length: 61:37
- Label: WellHouse

Shane & Shane chronology
The Worship Initiative (2015)	Psalms II (2015)

Psalms II is the tenth studio album by Shane & Shane. WellHouse Records released the album on October 23, 2015. This album charted on six Billboard magazine charts, including, The Billboard 200.

== Critical reception ==
Reviewing the album for AllMusic, Timothy Monger says, "A collection of 12 worship songs, each based on a different psalm...Mixing acoustic and folk elements with sweeping alt-rock and the duo's trademark close harmonies".

== Track listing ==
No.	Title	Writer(s)	Length
1.	"Psalm 46 (Lord of Hosts)"	Shane Barnard, Josh Miller, Jennie Lee Riddle, Josiah Warneking	5:03
2.	"Psalm 45 (Fairest of All)"	Barnard, Sean Carter	5:26
3.	"Psalm 34 (Taste and See)"	Barnard, Joe Rigney	5:27
4.	"Psalm 51 (Wisdom in the Secret Heart)"	Barnard	5:58
5.	"Psalm 139 (Far Too Wonderful)"	Barnard, Carter	5:13
6.	"Psalm 98 (Sing Unto the Lord)"	Barnard, Beth Barnard	3:43
7.	"Psalm 91 (On Eagles' Wings)"	Michael Joncas	4:05
8.	"Psalm 63 (Better Than Life)"	Barnard	5:22
9.	"Psalm 16 (Fullness of Joy)"	Barnard, Rigney	4:51
10.	"Take Over"	Barnard	6:32
11.	"Psalm 27 (One Thing)"	Barnard	5:10
12.	"Psalm 23 (Surely Goodness, Surely Mercy)"	Barnard	4:47
Total length:			61:37

== Chart performance ==
Chart (2015)	Peak position
US Billboard 200	179
US Christian Albums (Billboard)	9
US Independent Albums (Billboard)	11
