= Zealand Worship =

American worship band

- Origin: Franklin, Tennessee
- Genres: Contemporary Christian music, worship, rock
- Years active: 2015–present
- Labels: Word, Curb
- Members: Phil Joel; Ben Bugna; Roger Angove; Ben Garrett
- Website: zealandworship.com

Zealand Worship is an American worship band, founded by Phil Joel (formerly of Newsboys), hailing from Franklin, Tennessee. The band started making music in 2015. They released, Zealand Worship - The EP, an extended play, with both Word Records and Warner Records, in 2015.

== About Zealand Worship ==
It is led by Phil Joel, a bass player and vocalist for Newsboys. Zealand Worship signed with Word Worship, a division of Word Entertainment in May 2015. On December 13, 2017 the band announced their first full-length project Liberated to be released on February 9, 2018.

=== Background ===
Zealand Worship was started by Phil Joel, formerly of the Newsboys, who is the leader of the group. They are from Franklin, Tennessee, where they started in 2012.

=== Music history ===
The band commenced as a musical entity in 2012, with their first release, Zealand Worship - The EP, an extended play, that was released on June 23, 2015, They are from Franklin, Tennessee, where they started in 2012. by Word Records in tandem with Warner Records.

== Members ==
Current members

- Phil Joel (member of the Newsboys)
- Ben Bugna
- Roger Angove
- Ben Garrett

== Discography ==
=== EPs ===
- Zealand Worship - The EP (June 23, 2015, Word/Warner)

=== Singles ===
Year	Title	Peak chart positions		Album
Year	Title	US Christ.	Christ Airplay	Album
2016	"Good Good Father"	29	24	Zealand Worship: The EP
2016	"Your Love Is Wild"	43	25	Non-album single
2018	"Spirit Sing"	—	30	Liberated

=== Albums ===
- Liberated (2018)
