= Inpop Records =

American Christian record label

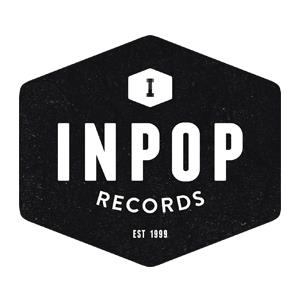
- Founded: 1999
- Founder: Peter Furler; Dale Bray; Wes Campbell
- Genre: Contemporary Christian
- Country of origin: United States
- Location: Nashville, Tennessee

Inpop Records is an independent contemporary Christian music record label based in Nashville, Tennessee, U.S. It was launched in July 1999 by Australians Peter Furler, Dale Bray, and Wes Campbell. The name was derived from the idea of wanting to highlight the talents of international pop artists, though they have signed an equal number of American artists.

== History ==
When former Newsboys lead singer Peter Furler and the band's manager Wes Campbell first came to the United States in the 1980s, they had no intention of owning a record label. A decade later, Furler decided he was tired of sharing his tour bus bunk with hundreds of demos piled high, all given to him from artists he met on tour. Deciding to do something about it, he and Campbell and Australian Businessman Dale Bray launched Inpop Records in July 1999. Inpop's stated goal is to discover the best artists around the world that understand the grace of the gospel of Jesus Christ, and who also have something new and unique to offer the world of Christian music.

In 2018 SoundHouse LLC acquired the assets of InPop Records

== Roster ==
- Consumed by Fire (US)
- Mat Kearney (US)
- Taylor Red (US)
- V. Rose (US)

== Previous roster ==
- Acquire the Fire (US)
- The Advice (US) (Active)
- Article One (Canada) (Disbanded)
- Bob Smiley (US) (Active)
- Beanbag (Australia) (Disbanded)
- The Benjamin Gate (South Africa) (Disbanded)
- Chasen (US) (Disbanded)
- Casting Pearls (US) (currently with INO Records)
- Charmaine (Australia) (Active) with in:ciite media/Word Distribution
- Everyday Sunday (US) (Active)
- Fusebox (US) (Disbanded)
- Foolish Things (US) (Disbanded)
- Go Fish (US) (Active)
- Ian Eskelin (US) (Active)
- JJ Weeks Band (US) (Active)
- Julian Drive (US) (Active)
- Jimmy Needham (US) (Active)
- Newsboys (Australia) (Active, now with Fair Trade Services)
- Newworldson (Canada) (Active, Platinum Pop Records)
- Paul Colman (Australia) (Active)
- Petra (US) (Active)
- Phil Joel (New Zealand) (Active, with deliberatePeople Records, now with Zealand Worship)
- Plus One (US) (Disbanded)
- Salvador (US) (Active)
- Sarah Brendel (Germany) (Active)
- Shane & Shane (US) (Active, now with Fair Trade Servies and INO Records)
- Stellar Kart (US) (Disbanded)
- Superchick (US) (Disbanded)
- Tree63 (South Africa) (Active)
- Tricia (US) (Active)
- Jaci Velasquez (US) (Active)
- Karyn Williams (US) (Active)

== See also ==
- List of record labels
