= Robert Farrell =

Robert Farrell may refer to:

- Robert C. Farrell (born 1936), member of the Los Angeles City Council
- Robert S. Farrell Jr. (1906–1947), American Republican politician from the state of Oregon
- Robert Farrell (technical analyst), Merrill Lynch analyst and creator of Market Rules to Remember
- Robert Farrell (cyclist) (born 1949), Trinidad Olympic cyclist
- Robert Farrell (priest), Irish Anglican priest
- Robert W. Farrell (1908–1986), American comics writer and editor.
- Robert Farrell, fictional super hero in Marvel Comics, known by the alias Rocket Racer
- Bob Farrell (Christian musician) (1948–2026), American Christian songwriter and musician (Farrell and Farrell)
- Bob Farrell (motivational speaker) (1927–2015), American motivational speaker and author
- Bob Farrell (minstrel singer), American minstrel singer, best known for "Zip Coon"
- Bobby Farrell (1949–2010), lead singer of Boney M
- Bobby Farrell (footballer) (1906–1971), Scottish footballer
- Bob Farrell, singer on !Hero

== See also ==
- Robert Hugh Ferrell (1921–2018), historian
