= 1829 in music =

Sheet music from 1829

This article is about music-related events in 1829.

== Events ==
- March 11 – The German composer Felix Mendelssohn (age 20) conducts the first performance of Johann Sebastian Bach's St Matthew Passion since the latter's death in 1750, at the Sing-Akademie zu Berlin; the success of this performance sparks a revival of interest in Bach.
- April–September – Mendelssohn pays his first visit to Britain. This visit included the first London performance of his concert overture to A Midsummer Night's Dream and his trip to Fingal's Cave.
- July – George Washington Dixon popularizes "Coal Black Rose" singing in blackface in New York City.
- December 29 – Soprano Eugenia Tadolini makes her house debut at the Teatro Regio di Parma.
- Frédéric Chopin concludes his studies at the music academy in Warsaw which will later be named after him. He also hears Paganini perform and begins writing his Etudes.

== Popular music ==
- "There's Nothing True but Heaven" words by Thomas Moore, music by Oliver Shaw

== Classical music ==
- Hector Berlioz – La Mort de Cleopatre
- Norbert Burgmüller – Piano Concerto in F-sharp minor
- Frederic Chopin
  - Introduction and Polonaise Brillante Op. 3
  - Piano Trio Op. 8
  - Étude Op. 10, No. 8
  - Étude Op. 10, No. 9
  - Étude Op. 10, No. 10
  - Étude Op. 10, No. 11
  - Piano Concerto No. 2
- Carl Czerny
  - Piano Trio No.2, Op.166
  - Sonatina in A major, Op.167
  - Systematische Anleitung zum Fantasieren auf dem Pianoforte, Op.200
- Fanny Hensel – Capriccio for Cello and Piano in A-flat major
- Johann Nepomuk Hummel – Gesellschafts Rondo, Op.117
- Friedrich Kuhlau
  - Fantaisie, Op.93
  - Introduction and Rondo on 'Le Colporteur', Op.98a
  - 3 Brilliant Duos for 2 Flutes, Op.102
  - 7 Variations on an Irish Folksong, Op.105
- Caspar Kummer
  - Adagio et Variations sur un Thême de l’Opéra : Armida, de Rossini, p. Cor de Bassette avec Orchestre, Op. 45
  - 2 Duos for Flute and Clarinet, Op.46
  - Flute Trio, Op.53
- Joseph Merk – Valses brillantes, Op.6
- Gioachino Rossini – William Tell Overture

== Opera ==
- Michael William Balfe – I rivali di se stessi
- Gioacchino Rossini – William Tell first performed in Paris. Libretto by Étienne de Jouy, Florent Bis and Armand Marrast.

== Births ==
- January 24 – William Mason, pianist and composer (d. 1908)
- February 4 – Marquis d'Ivry, composer (died 1903)
- February 11 – Camillo Walzel, librettist (died 1895)
- March 6 – Heinrich Lichner, composer (d. 1898)
- May 8 – Louis Moreau Gottschalk, pianist and composer (d. 1869)
- May 9 – Ciro Pinsuti, pianist and composer (d. 1888)
- June 9 – Gaetano Braga, cellist and composer (d. 1907)
- June 11 – Horace Poussard, violinist and composer (d. 1898)
- August 7 – Timoteo Pasini, composer, conductor, and pianist (d. 1888)
- August 21 – Otto Goldschmidt, pianist, conductor and composer (d. 1907)
- August 25 – Carlo Acton, pianist and composer (d. 1909)
- August 28 – Albert Dietrich, composer (d. 1908)
- October 6 – Josef Gänsbacher, music educator (died 1911)
- November 28 – Anton Rubinstein, pianist, conductor and composer (d. 1894)
- date unknown
  - Fritz Andersen, composer (died 1910)

== Deaths ==
- January 25 – William Shield, violinist and composer (b. 1748)
- January 30 – Friedrich Haug, lyricist (born 1761)
- February 16 – François Joseph Gossec, composer (b. 1734)
- February 18 – Jan Křtitel Kuchař, organist, composer and teacher (b. 1751)
- April 28 – Karl Gottlieb Umbreit, composer (born 1763)
- May 8 – Mauro Giuliani, guitarist and composer (b. 1781)
- August 15 – Christian Gottlieb Scheidler, composer (born 1747)
- August 16 – Carl Gotthelf Gläser, hymnist (born 1784)
- October 29 – Maria Anna Mozart, elder sister of Wolfgang Amadeus Mozart (b. 1751)
- December 14 – Luigi Marchesi, castrato singer (b. 1754)
