= Pete Stewart =

- Origin: Seattle, Washington, U.S.
- Genres: Rock
- Occupations: Singer; guitarist; songwriter; producer
- Instrument(s): Guitar, vocals
- Years active: 1994–present
- Spouse: Alison Martin Stewart (m. 2023)

Pete Stewart is a singer, guitarist, songwriter and producer from Seattle, Washington. He is the lead singer and guitarist of Grammatrain, was the lead singer for The Accident Experiment, and is the former guitarist of Tait.

Stewart released solo albums in 1999, 2007 and 2010. He served as producer, songwriter, and guitarist for the debut albums of Tait (the solo project of Michael Tait) and TobyMac, the latter of which sold over 500,000 copies.

== Awards ==
- 2013 Grammy Award: Best Rap Album – Macklemore & Ryan Lewis: The Heist (Engineer/Mixer)
- 2009 Grammy Award: Best Rock/Rap Gospel Album – TobyMac: Alive and Transported (Songwriter)
- 2005 Dove Award: Special Event Album – !Hero: The Rock Opera (Producer/Songwriter)
- 2003 San Diego Music Award: Best New Rock Artist – The Accident Experiment (Producer/Songwriter/Vocalist)
- 2002 Dove Award: Best Rap/HipHop Album – TobyMac: Momentum (Producer/Songwriter)
- 2002 Grammy Award: Best Gospel Rock Album – dcTalk: Solo (Producer/Songwriter)

== Discography ==
=== with Grammatrain ===
- Grammatrain – 1995
- Lonely House – 1995
- Flying – 1997
- Live – 1998
- Kneeling Between Shields EP – 2009
- Imperium – 2010

=== Solo recordings ===
- Pete Stewart – 1999
- I Gave You a Desert – 2007
- Under North Sky – 2010
- "Wings on Butterflies" - 2021

=== with The Accident Experiment ===
- Arena EP – 2003
- Mind Death Machine maxi single – 2005
- United We Fear – released Independently in 2005, then signed to Rock Ridge which re-released it in 2006

=== with Tait ===
- Empty – 2001

== Album credits ==
=== Producer ===
- DC Talk – Solo (Virgin Records/EMI) – _{2002 Grammy for Best Gospel Rock Album}
- TobyMac – Momentum (ForeFront Records/EMI) – _{RIAA Gold Sales Award, 2002 Dove Award for Best Rap/HipHop Album}
- Tait – Empty (ForeFront Records/EMI)
- Sanctus Real – Say It Loud (Sparrow Records/EMI)
- Peace of Mind – Peace of Mind (BEC Recordings/EMI)
- Write This Down – "Lost Weekend" (Tooth & Nail Records/EMI)
- !Hero: The Rock Opera (Meaux Music) – _{2005 Dove Award for Special Event Album of the Year}
- Bleach – Bleach (ForeFront Records/EMI)
- Whitney Mongé – Steadfast (independent)
- Rex Lex – Rex Lex (independent)
- Corrin Campbell – "Gilded" (independent)

== See also ==
- Grammatrain
