= Henry Harrington =

Henry Harrington may refer to:

- Henry F. Harrington, American newspaper editor
- Henry Moore Harrington (1849–1876), U.S. military officer during the Native American Wars
- Henry W. Harrington (1825–1882), U.S. Representative from Indiana
- Henry William Harrington (North Carolina general) (1747–1809), Brigadier General in the American Revolution
