= George Washington Dixon =

American entertainer

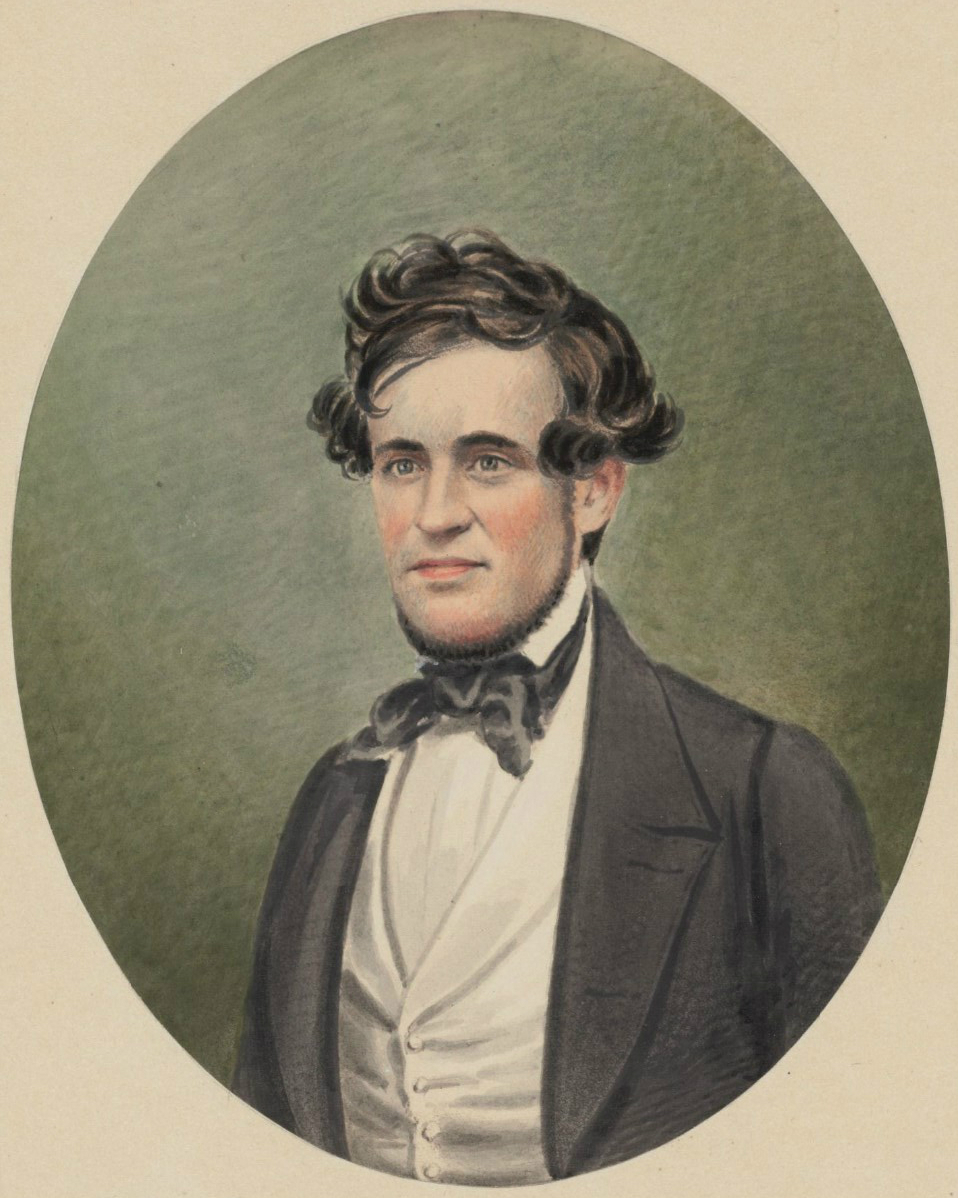
- Born: 1801; Richmond, Virginia, U.S.
- Died: March 2, 1861 (aged 59–60)

George Washington Dixon (1801? – March 2, 1861) was an American singer, stage actor, and newspaper editor. He rose to prominence as a blackface performer (possibly the first American to do so) after performing "Coal Black Rose", "Zip Coon", and similar songs. He later turned to a career in journalism, during which he earned the enmity of members of the upper class for his frequent allegations against them.

At age 15, Dixon joined the circus, where he quickly established himself as a singer. In 1829, he began performing "Coal Black Rose" in blackface; this and similar songs would propel him to stardom. In contrast to his contemporary Thomas D. Rice, Dixon was primarily a singer rather than a dancer. He was by all accounts a gifted vocalist, and much of his material was quite challenging. "Zip Coon" became his trademark song.

By 1835, Dixon considered journalism to be his primary vocation. His first major paper was Dixon's Daily Review, which he published from Lowell, Massachusetts, in 1835. He followed this in 1836 with Dixon's Saturday Night Express, published in Boston. By this point, he had taken to using his paper to expose what he considered the misdeeds of the upper classes. These stories earned him many enemies, and Dixon was taken to court on several occasions. His most successful paper was the Polyanthos, which he began publishing in 1838 from New York City. Under its masthead, he challenged some of his greatest adversaries, including Thomas S. Hamblin, Reverend Francis L. Hawks, and Madame Restell. After a brief foray into hypnotism, "pedestrianism" (long-distance walking), and other pursuits, he retired to New Orleans, Louisiana.

== Childhood, adolescence and young manhood ==
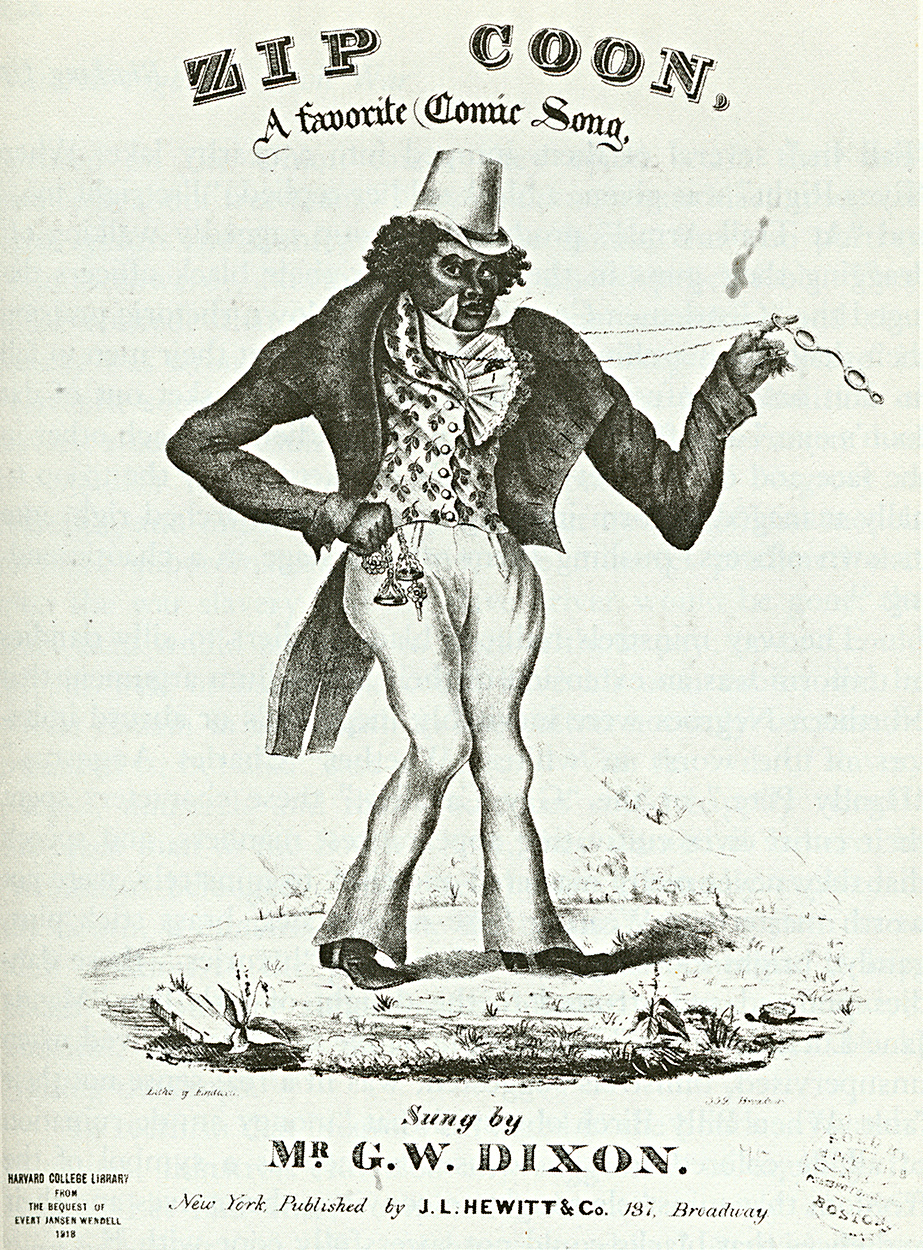
Sheet music cover for "Zip Coon", 1830s

Details about Dixon's childhood are scarce. The record suggests that he was born in Richmond, Virginia, probably in 1801, to a working-class family. He may have been educated at a charity school. Fairly detailed descriptions and portraits of Dixon survive; he had a swarthy complexion and a "splendid head of hair". However, the question of whether he was white or black is an open one. His enemies sometimes called him a "mulatto", a "Negro", or referred to him as "Zip Coon", the name of the black character in one of his songs. However, the weight of evidence suggests that if Dixon did have black ancestry, it was fairly remote.

A newspaper story from 1841 claims that at age 15, Dixon's singing caught the attention of a circus proprietor named West. The man convinced Dixon to join his traveling circus as a stablehand and errand boy. Dixon traveled with this and other circuses for a time, and he appears as a singer and reciter of poems on bills dated from as early as February 1824. By early 1829, he had taken on the epithet "The American Buffo Singer".

Over three days in late July 1829, Dixon performed "Coal Black Rose" in blackface at the Bowery, Chatham Garden, and Park theatres in New York City. The Flash characterized his audience as "crowded galleries and scantily filled boxes"; that is, mostly working-class. On September 24 at the Bowery, Dixon performed Love in a Cloud, a dramatic interpretation of the events described in "Coal Black Rose" and possibly the first blackface farce. These performances proved a hit, and Dixon rose to celebrity, perhaps before any other American blackface performer had done so. On December 14, Dixon's benefit at the Albany Theatre (sometimes called the Pearl Street Theatre) in Albany, New York grossed $155.87, the largest take there since the opening night earlier that year.

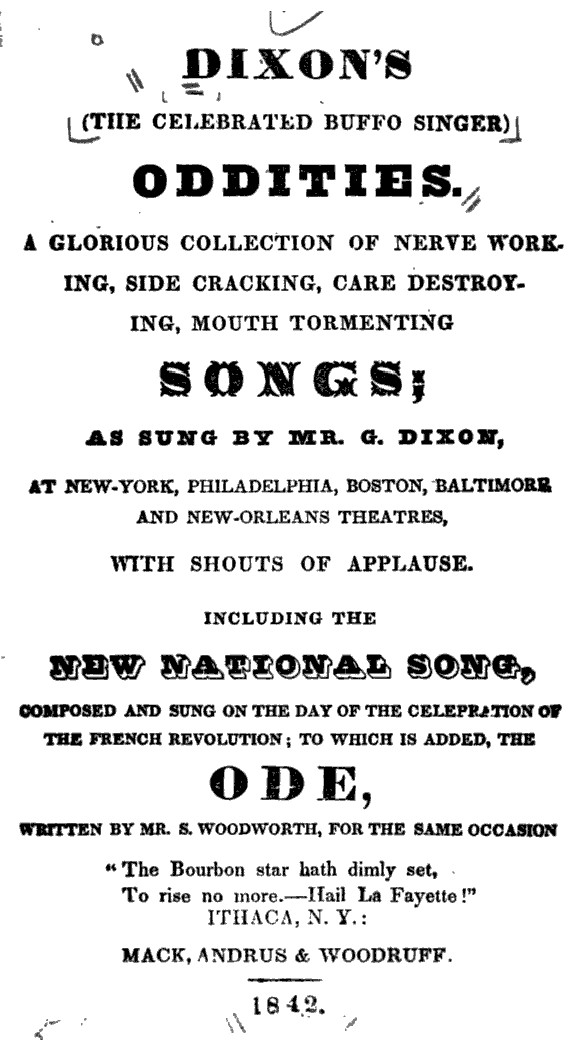
Cover to the 1842 edition of Dixon's Oddities

Dixon performed through 1834, most frequently at New York's three major theatres. In addition to blackface song-and-dance numbers, he did whiteface songs and scenes from popular plays; much of his material was quite challenging. Dixon's fame allowed him to pepper his material with satire and political commentary. On November 25, 1830, he sang before a crowd of 120,000 in Washington, D.C., in support of the July Revolution in France. He began selling a collection of songs and skits he had popularized called Dixon's Oddities in 1830; the book remained in print long after. Dixon mostly played to a working-class audience, including in his repertoire such songs as "The New York Fireman", which compared firefighters to the American Founding Fathers. Oratory made up another facet of his act; on December 4, 1832, the Baltimore Patriot reported that Dixon would read an address from the President at the Front Street Theatre.

In 1833, he started a small newspaper called the Stonington Cannon. However, the publication saw little success, and by January 1834, he was performing again, now with new talents, such as ventriloquism. Dixon seemed untarnished by his yearlong hiatus. Reviews said that "his voice seems formed of the music itself— 'it thrills, it animates' ..." The Telegraph wrote,

Few Melodists have gained more celebrity or been so universally admired, ... The many effusions from the pen of this gentleman independent of his vocal powers, is sufficient proof of his being a man of considerable talent and originality—you should hear him sing his national air "on a wing that beamed in glory" [and it would be] unnecessary for us to enlarge on his merits as a vocalist—for his Melodies display a feeling of Patriotism which attracts the attention of every beholder.

In March, Dixon performed "Zip Coon" for the first time. Although Dixon had previously sung "Long Tail Blue", another racist tale about a black "dandy" trying to fit into Northern white society, "Zip Coon" garnered acclaim and quickly became an audience favorite and Dixon's trademark tune. He later claimed to have written the song, although others performed it before him, so this seems unlikely. Dixon accompanied his singing with an earthy jig.

On July 7, the Farren Riots erupted. Young men in New York City targeted the homes, businesses, churches, and institutions of black New Yorkers and abolitionists. On the night of July 9, the mob stormed the Bowery Theatre. Manager Thomas S. Hamblin failed to quell them, and actor Edwin Forrest did not meet their expectations when they ordered him to perform. According to the New York Sun:

Mr. Dixon, the singer (an American,) now made his appearance. "Let us have Zip Coon," exclaimed a thousand voices. The singer gave them their favorite song, amidst peals of laughter,—and his Honor the Mayor, who as the old woman said of her husband, is a "good-natured, easy fellow," made his appearance, delivered a short speech, made a low bow, and went out. Dixon, who had produced such amazing good nature with "Zip Coon," next addressed them—and they soon quietly dispersed.

== Dixon the editor ==
In early 1835, Dixon moved to Lowell, Massachusetts, a small town growing out of the Industrial Revolution. By April, he had taken the epithet "The National Melodist" and was editing Dixon's Daily Review. The paper took as motto "Knowledge—Liberty—Utility—Representation—Responsibility" and championed the Whig Party, Radical Republicanism, and the working class. Dixon's Daily Review also explored morality and women's place in the rapidly changing society of the urban North.

Dixon's criticism of his colleagues did not win him any friends, and in June, the Boston Post reported that he had "flogged one of the editors of the Lowell Castigator, and was hunting after the other." By the next month, Dixon had sold his paper, and the new publishers were eager to point out that Dixon no longer had anything to do with its production. By August, rumors were circulating that Dixon had started up another paper called the News Letter and was selling it in Lowell and Boston. If he did, no copies are known to have survived.

By February 1836, Dixon was touring again. He played many well-attended shows in Boston that month and did a play at the Tremont Theatre. His recent forays into publishing had soured his image in the popular press, however, and The New York Times satirized his lower-class audience:

Tremont Teatre. At this classical establishment, Mr Dixon, "the American Buffo singer," is at present the star. His third night is announced! Will some of the enlightened citizens of the emporium favor us with their opinion of his performance? Is his Zip Coon as thrilling as Mr Wood's "Still so gently o'er me stealing?"

On 16 and April 30, Dixon played the Masonic Temple in Boston. There he included material to appeal to his lower-class audience, such as a popular tune that he had adapted with lyrics about the Boston Fire Department. Nevertheless, he also reached out to a richer, middle-class patronage. For example, he played alongside a classically trained pianist, and he billed the performance as a "concert", a word typically reserved for high-class, non-blackface entertainment. Dixon earned a third of the gross from this engagement: $23.50. He still owed money to the printer of Dixon's Daily Review, so these earnings were put in trust for the conductor of the orchestra to pick up at a later date. Dixon and the printer grew impatient and presented a forged note to the trustee to collect early. Within a few days, Dixon was arrested and jailed in Boston. The press took the opportunity to castigate him again: "George Washington Dixon, now cormorant of Boston jail, and ex-publisher, ex-editor, ex-broker, ex-melodist, &c., is quite out of tune." The Boston Courier called Dixon "the most miserable apology for a vocalist that ever bored the public ear."

At the trial, held in mid-June, character witnesses testified that Dixon was "a harmless, inoffensive man, but destitute of business capacity" and "in reply to the question whether Dixon was non compos mentis, I consider him as being on the frontier line—sometimes on one side, and sometimes on the other, just as the breeze of fortune happens to blow." In the end, he was found not guilty when the prosecution failed to satisfy that he had known the document to be a forgery. Dixon took the opportunity to give a speech to the public outside. He then returned to the stage, earning a considerable $527.50 in late July.

Dixon was still guilty in the eyes of the press, however, and his letters to clear his name only made things worse:

Mister Zip Coon is at his old tricks again. So far from possessing the ability to write a letter Miss Nancy-Coal-Black-Rose Dixon cannot begin to write ten consecutive words of the English language, and he must have encountered "the Schoolmaster abroad" in the Athenian city that teaches "penmanship in six lessons," and that lately too if he can sign his name.

By the end of 1836, Dixon had moved to Boston and started a new paper, the Bostonian; or, Dixon's Saturday Night Express. The paper focused on working-class issues, religious values, and opposition to abortion. It followed the lead of the Daily Review in exposing allegedly immoral affairs of well known Bostonians. One story told of two personalities eloping. Other Boston papers called the story false, and the Boston Herald labeled Dixon a "knave". Dixon fired back, depicting the paper's editor, Henry F. Harrington, as a monkey.

In early 1837, Dixon was again in legal trouble. Harrington accused Dixon of stealing half a ream of paper from the Morning Post, the principal competition to Harrington's Herald. The judge eventually dismissed the case, agreeing that the paper had been taken, but ruling that no proof pointed to Dixon as the one who had taken it. Dixon gave another post-trial speech, followed by a stage show on February 4.

Not ten days after the end of the Harrington case, Dixon was charged with forging a signature on a bail bond pertaining to his previous debt from July 1835. He was sent to Lowell and jailed. The press responded with its usual glee: "George has been a great eulogist, the defender of the Constitution! But he cannot defend himself." At his hearing on February 15, bail was set at $1000, an unheard of amount for the time. Unable to pay, he was transferred to a jail in Concord, Massachusetts.

Dixon's March 16 trial ended in conviction. His appeal to the Massachusetts Supreme Judicial Court on April 17 resulted in a hung jury, and his prosecutors dropped the charges against him. He gave another of his by now trademark post-trial addresses. The Boston Post wrote: "I begin to think that the Melodist bears a charmed life—and as was often said to be done in olden time, has made a bargain with the Being of Darkness for a certain term of years, during which he may defy the majesty of the law, and the wrath of his enemies."

Another stage tour followed, with concerts in Lowell, New England, and Maine. This was an apparent success, with one reviewer saying that Dixon had "a voice which all unite in pronouncing to be of remarkable richness and compass." That Fall, he may have contemplated a tour with James Salisbury, a black musician and dancer well known in lower-class districts of Boston such as Ann Street. Instead, he appeared on December 6 at the upper-class Opera Saloon, singing selections from popular operas. His fame (or notoriety) served to get him listed as a candidate for the Boston mayoral race in December. Dixon won nine votes, despite his polite refusal to serve should he be elected.

== The Polyanthos ==
Dixon performed in Boston through the end of February 1838. That spring, he moved to New York City, where he re-entered the publishing business with a newspaper called the Polyanthos and Fire Department Album. Dixon again championed the lower class and aimed to expose the sordid affairs of the rich, especially those who preyed upon lower-class women.

An early Polyanthos alleged that Thomas Hamblin, manager of the Bowery Theatre, was engaging in an affair with Miss Missouri, a teen-aged performer there. Within ten days of publication, Miss Missouri turned up dead, reportedly killed by "inflammation of the brain caused by the violent misconduct of Miss Missouri's mother and the publication of an abusive article in The Polyanthos." On July 28, Hamblin accosted Dixon. Another assault in August prompted Dixon to start carrying a pistol. Undaunted, Dixon continued his attacks on Hamblin and others in the Polyanthos. He exposed another alleged affair, this between a merchant named Rowland R. Minturn and the wife of a shipmaker named James H. Roome. Twelve days after the publication, Roome killed himself.

Another article alleged that Francis L. Hawks, an Episcopalian rector and reverend at the St. Thomas Church of New York, had been engaging in illicit sexual behavior. On December 31, Dixon was in court, charged with libel. Dixon spent a week in jail, then paid the $2000 bail. However, before he could even leave the jailhouse, he was arrested for a charge leveled by Rowland Minturn's brothers that Dixon's article had resulted in the man's death.

Bail was raised to $9000, an enormous amount, which Dixon protested. The prosecution argued that "The accused is a criminal of the blackest dye, and by his infamous publication is morally guilty of no less than three murders, and I hope the court will not diminish the amount of bail one iota!" It did not. Nevertheless, a notorious New York madam named Adeline Miller paid it, and Dixon walked free. Only a month later, though, she had sent Dixon back to jail for unknown reasons. Facing seven counts (four from Hawks and three from the Minturns), the singer and editor remained incarcerated for two months while he awaited trial.

The Minturn case came first, on April 15, 1839. After three days, the jury came back unable to reach a verdict, and the Minturn brothers dropped the charges. Dixon returned to jail, but Hawks dropped his charges from four to three. The judge lowered bail to $900 on April 20, and Dixon walked free.

The press renewed their attacks on him:

To those who know the true character, and something of the personal history of this imbecile vagrant, the exuberance of indignation with which he is pursued, appears truly ridiculous. That he is disgusting, a nuisance, and a bore, we know—and so is a spider. Nobody would dream, however, of extinguishing the latter insect with a park of artillery; though all the city seem to have fancied that George Washington Dixon could be conquered with no less. The truth of him is, that he is a most unmitigated fool; and as to his pursuing any person with malice, he is not capable of any sentiment requiring the appreciation of real or fancied injury. If he were kicked down stairs, he could not decide, until told by some one else, whether the kick was the result of accident or design, and if design, whether it was intended as a compliment or an insult.

Dixon fought back in the Polyanthos by defending himself and his motives, and to some degree, he seems to have succeeded. The Herald for one admitted that his trial had exposed an unsavory facet of the upper class. Nevertheless, on May 10, Dixon changed his plea to guilty regarding one count, and the next day did the same for the other two. He was sentenced to six months of hard labor at the New York State Penitentiary at Blackwell's Island. Dixon reportedly responded, "This is a pretty situation for an editor." He would later claim that Hawks had paid him $1000 to change his plea.

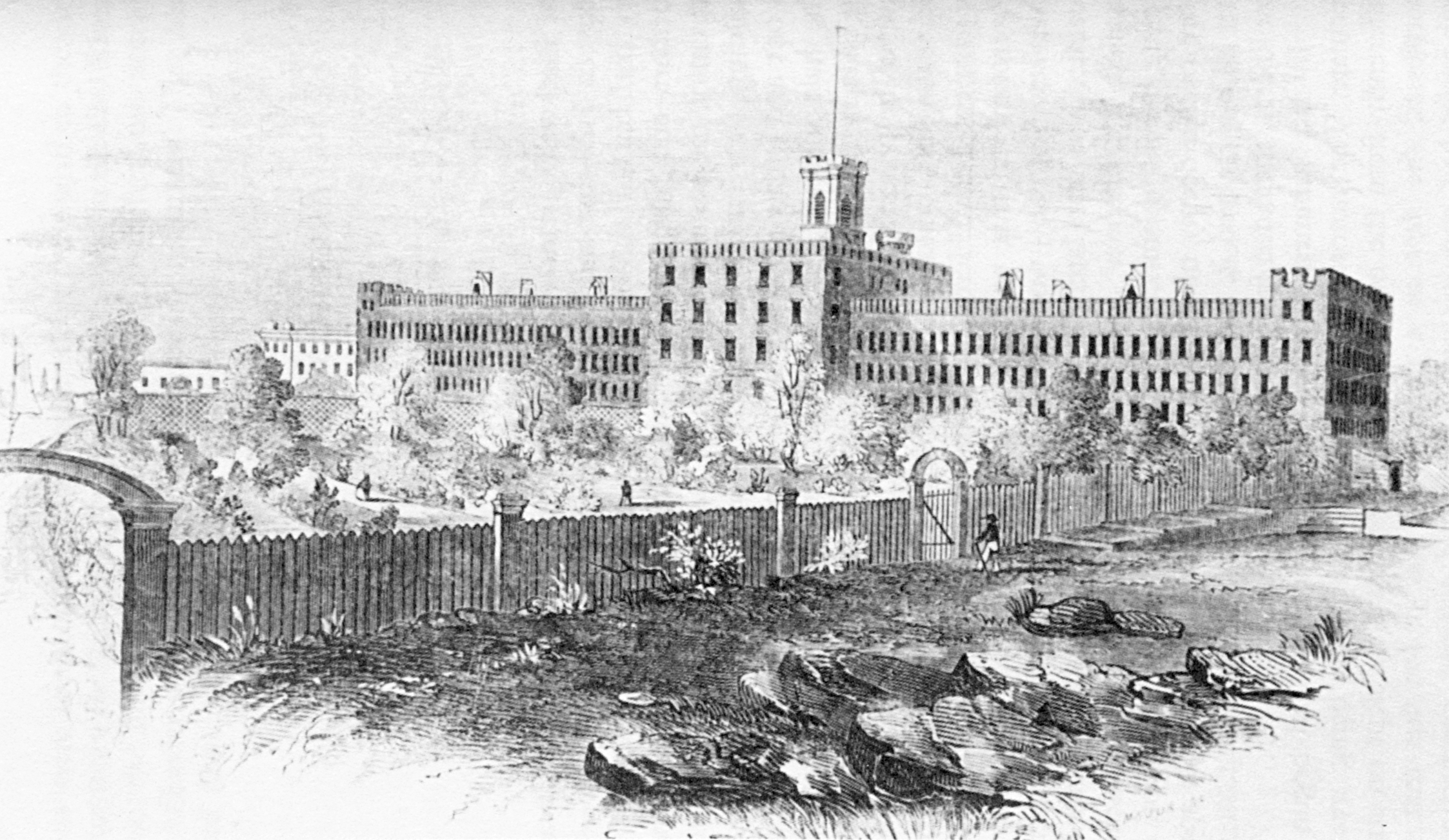
The prison at Blackwell's Island, where Dixon served a six-month sentence for libel

The press reacted with its usual fervor:

Dixon is a mulatto, and was, not many years ago, employed in this city, in an oyster house to open oysters and empty the shells into the carts before they were carried away. He is an impudent scoundrel, aspires to every thing, and was fit to be any body's fool. Somebody used his name (such as he called himself, for negroes have, by right, no surnames) as the publisher of a newspaper, in which every body, almost, was libelled. He is now caged, and, we may hope, will, when he comes out of prison, go to opening oysters, or some other employment appropriate to his habits and color.

Dixon served out his sentence then returned to New York. He resumed the Polyanthos, emerging as the leader of a cadre of like-minded editors interested in exposing immorality. Dixon now focused his efforts on Austrian dancer Fanny Elssler, whom he accused of sexual misconduct. On August 21, 1840, he went so far as to rally a riot against her and then published the inciting speech in the Polyanthos. He then targeted men who seduced young, working-class women, boarders who cheated their landlords, dysfunctional banks, and so-called British agents who were supposedly stirring up anti-American sentiment among American Indians and black slaves. Dixon claimed to be "a battering-ram against vice and folly in every shape", writing:

The Polyanthos cannot die. The protecting Providence that watches over the safety of the just, and defeats the machinations of the wicked, will make it bloom ... We prophesy that the latest descendant of the youngest newsboy will animate his hearers with the desire to emulate the enviable fame of DIXON! Our name will be handed down to the end of time as one of the most independent men of the nineteenth century! Our very hat will become a relic.

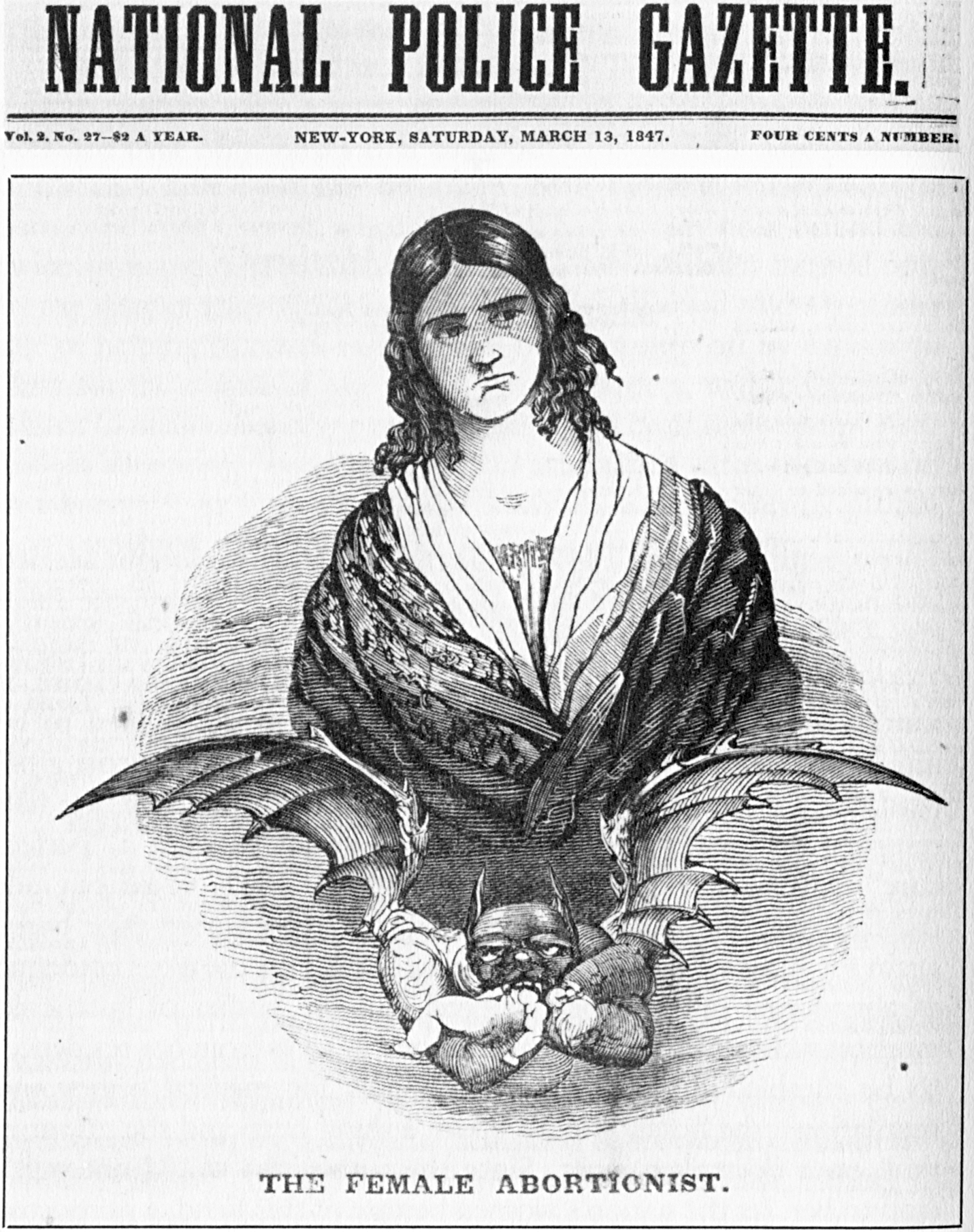
Penny press depiction of Madame Restell

On February 16, 1841, Dixon turned to a crusade against a New York abortionist known as Madame Restell. He vowed to reprint an anti-Restell editorial every week until the authorities took notice or Restell stopped running newspaper ads for her abortion services. As for abortion itself, Dixon claimed that it subverted marriage by inhibiting procreation and encouraged female infidelity.

Dixon kept his word, illustrating the editorial in later runs with woodcuts of Restell carrying a skull-and-crossbones emblem. When the March 17 New York Courier quoted the New York grand jury as saying "We earnestly pray that if there is no law that will reach this [Madame Restell], which we present as a public nuisance, the court will take measures for procuring the passage of such a law", Dixon responded with the March 20 headline "Restell caught at last!" On March 22, Ann Lohman, part of the husband-and-wife team behind the Restell name, was arrested. Dixon claimed vindication and covered the trial over several issues of the Polyanthos. After her conviction on July 20, he wrote, "the monster in human shape ... has ... been convicted of one of the most hellish acts ever perpetrated in a Christian land!"

On September 12, a man in the street struck Dixon in the head with an ax, which prompted some of the only positive press Dixon ever enjoyed that was not related to his singing. The Uncle Sam praised his editing and writing: "Go on martyr of virtue, go on and prosper! Go on getting out extras, and defending the sacredness of the marriage institution. Go on through malice, opposition, fiery trials, persecutions and assassinations—posterity will do thee justice ... !"

Even with positive press, Dixon's troubles with the courts were not over. Around September 16, he allegedly assaulted Peter D. Formal, who was taking down bills that Dixon had posted. Dixon failed to appear for his October court date, and he skipped later dates on 1 and November 11. On November 19, he again was placed under arrest for obscenity as part of a citywide campaign by the district attorney to fight yellow journalism. On January 13, 1842, Dixon was indicted for the charges in absentia. A warrant was issued for his arrest on April 13. By this time, he had handed the Polyanthos to Louse Leah, and the charges were eventually dropped.

In late 1841, Dixon had gotten into another row with a colleague. William Joseph Snelling obtained a warrant against him, and Dixon countersued. Snelling wrote anonymously in the Flash:

We know him for a greedy, sordid, unscrupulous knave, of old; ... We are aware that men are judged by the company they keep and that we shall be blamed for having had anything to do with Dixon. Be it so.—We deserve rebuke, we have suffered for our folly and, if that is not enough, we are content to sit down in sackcloth and ashes; the meet attire of fools who trust to a person so vile that the English language cannot express his unmitigated baseness.

In keeping with sexual morality at the time, Dixon and his colleagues sometimes checked bordellos for cleanliness, friendliness, and other factors. Snelling drew from this, linking Dixon to organized prostitution and alleging that he had connections to a madam named Julia Brown. Eventually, another editor named George B. Wooldridge joined with Dixon for a few issues of the True Flash, but they did not sell well. Rumors circulated at this time that Dixon was to be married, but sources disagreed over the identity of the fiancée; one said she was a Congressman's daughter, another that she was a madam. The Flash published a story that Brown and a prostitute named Phoebe Doty had been seen fighting over the Melodist. If Dixon did marry, no record survives of it.

== Later career ==
Beginning in 1842, Dixon took on a number of new occupations, including animal magnetist and spiritualist specializing in clairvoyance. A fad for public competitions and feats of endurance served as another vehicle for him to keep his name in the public eye; he became a "pedestrian", a long-distance sport walker. The participation of Dixon, a blackface singer and dancer, in these contests presaged the challenge dances of performers such as Master Juba and John Diamond in the next few years.

In February, he competed to win $4,000 by walking 48 hours without stopping. When the prize failed to materialize, Dixon charged admission to watch him. Later that month, Dixon tried to break this record by walking 50 hours. His publicity was, as usual, bad. Brother Jonathan gave this advice: "walk in one direction all the time, from this part of the compass, till ocean fetches him up, and then see how far he can swim." He walked for 60 hours that summer in Richmond, then did 30 miles (48 km) in five hours and 35 minutes in Washington, D.C. Dixon tried many other feats of endurance. For example, in late August, he stood on a plank for three days and two nights with no sleep. In September, he paced for 76 hours on a 15-foot-long (five-meter) platform.

Meanwhile, he did not give up his singing career. In early 1843, Dixon (now called "Pedestrian and Melodist") appeared at least once more at the Bowery Theatre, and he played on bills with Richard Pelham and Billy Whitlock. On January 29, he performed at a benefit for Dan Emmett. These concerts would be his last.

Despite these excursions into athletics and entertainment, Dixon still considered himself an editor. He started a new paper called Dixon's Regulator by March, and he renewed his public crusade in New York. On February 22, 1846, he posted handbills around the city publicizing a meeting to protest further activities by Madame Restell. At the rally the next day, several hundred people listened to Dixon speak against the abortionist, calling for her neighbors to demand her eviction or else to take matters into their own hands. The crowd then walked to her residence three blocks away to shout threats but eventually dispersed. Restell responded with a letter to the New York Tribune and New York Herald alleging that Dixon was simply trying to extort money from her in return for an end to his agitation:

Again and again have I been applied to by his emissaries for money, and as often have they been refused; and, as a consequence, I have been vilified and abused without stint or measure, which, of course, I expected, and, of the two, would prefer to his praise.

During the Mexican–American War, Dixon added some timely political references to "Zip Coon" and briefly returned to the public eye. Another crusade seems to have drawn Dixon away from New York in 1847. He was probably one of the first Radical Republicans to entrench himself as a filibuster in the Yucatán in a bid to annex more territory for the United States.

Dixon retired to New Orleans, Louisiana, sometime before 1848. A city directory gives his address as "Literary Tent", and his obituary in the Baton Rouge Daily Gazette and Comet states that the Poydras Market "by night and day, was the home of this waif upon society ... The 'General' was not without friends who contributed an odd 'five' to him when too frail to move about." He came down with pulmonary tuberculosis sometime in mid-1860. On February 27, 1861, he checked into the New Orleans Charity Hospital, noting his occupation as "editor". Dixon died on March 2.
