= Grammatrain =

Alternative rock band

- Origin: Seattle, Washington, U.S.
- Genres: Alternative rock; post-grunge; grunge; Christian rock (early)
- Years active: 1994–1998, 2009–present
- Labels: ForeFront, independent
- Members: Pete Stewart; Dalton Roraback; Paul Joseph Roraback

Grammatrain is an American rock band from Seattle, Washington that formed in 1994. The band was active in the Christian rock industry during the 1990s. Grammatrain disbanded in 1998 and reunited in 2009. According to drummer Paul Joseph Roraback in a 1995 interview, the band's name came from a poem he wrote about his grandmother called "Grandma's Train", which was the band's original name before changing it to Grammatrain shortly after forming.

== History ==
Grammatrain formed in 1994 with vocalist/guitarist Pete Stewart, drummer Paul Joseph Roraback and his brother, bassist Dalton Roraback. Paul was previously a drummer for the Christian metal band Paragon; he performed on the band's two releases, Just Believe in 1984 and Dead and Alive in 1988, both of which were demos released exclusively on cassette. Paul was later a touring member for American Christian metal band Bloodgood from 1991 to 1993. Paul played drums on the band's third live album, To Germany, With Love! - Live in Germany 1993, before Bloodgood disbanded in 1994.

Grammatrain recorded a self-titled three-song demo cassette tape, released independently in March 1994, and later released a self-titled demo CD on Zoe Worldwide Records containing four studio recordings and six live acoustic songs. After hearing one of the demo songs, ForeFront Records label executive Eddie DeGarmo signed the band.

Grammatrain's debut studio album, Lonely House, was released on September 19, 1995, and produced by Aaron Sprinkle. "Believe" and "She Don't Know" were released as singles from the album. "Believe" received a music video, which was directed by Henry Shepherd. Lonely House achieved success on Christian radio.

Grammatrain's second studio album, Flying, was released on July 6, 1997. A music video was made for the song "Peace". Critics cited the album's "lighter, more polished feel" when compared to Lonely House. At the end of a tour promoting the album, Grammatrain officially broke up following their final live performance on December 7, 1998, in Germany. An announcement of the breakup can be heard on the band's live album. Grammatrain's live album, Live 120798, was released on ForeFront Records in 1999. Grammatrain appeared on ForeFront Records' Ten: The Birthday Album compilation in 1998, as well as tribute albums to Larry Norman, Stryper, and Petra.

== Reunion ==
In early 2009, Grammatrain announced they reunited and were in the process of recording a new album. Pete Stewart had left the Christian faith, however, and the album was not directed at Christian audiences. Shortly after the announcement, the band played two reunion shows: one in Seattle and one in Germany. A limited-edition EP with songs from the forthcoming album was released at the shows and on the band's website.

In 2010, the single "The Last Sound" was released; the video was debuted at a Seattle Sounders FC match. The song has been played at Qwest Field before the kickoff of Sounders matches, and Sounders FC owner Drew Carey endorsed the song and promised to get a "proper video" made of it. The video was produced and directed by Nik Venet, who had previously done videos for Jane's Addiction, The White Stripes and U2. The song was also picked up by and released through Rock Band Network for the Xbox 360.

Grammatrain's third studio album, Imperium, was released independently on October 10, 2010.

== Side projects ==
Following the breakup of Grammatrain in December 1998, Paul and Pete released several solo albums. In 1999, Pete Stewart released a self-titled solo album on ForeFront Records, followed by two independent solo albums, I Gave You a Desert and Under North Sky, released in 2007 and 2010. Stewart joined Michael Tait's Christian rock band Tait in 2001, playing keyboards and guitars on the band's debut album, Empty. He also produced four tracks on the 2001 debut solo album for TobyMac, Momentum. In 2002, Stewart left Tait and joined Marcos Curiel's band The Accident Experiment as the vocalist, which released one EP, Arena, in 2003 and one studio album, United We Fear, in 2005 before going on hiatus in 2006. Stewart was also the guitarist on rap rock group Peace of Mind's self-titled studio album in 2003, with Christian rapper KJ-52 being the vocalist.

Paul Joseph Roraback has released four solo albums under the name PJ Bostic: Bullies at the Border in 2008, 3MS (Three Minute Song) in 2013, Light Me On in 2015, and Faith of Least Resistance in 2021. In 2016, Paul played drums on Love You to Death, the fourth studio album by Christian punk/crossover thrash band One Bad Pig, as well as co-produced, engineered, and mixed the album. Bloodgood singer Les Carlsen contributed guest vocals to the album. Paul also released five solo singles from 2016 to 2022, as well as a music video for his song "Blue Light Gaze" in 2023.

== Discography ==
Grammatrain discography
- Studio albums: 3
- Extended plays: 2
- Live albums: 1
- Singles: 3
- Video albums: 1
- Music videos: 2
- Demo albums: 2

Studio albums

- Lonely House (1995)
- Flying (1997)
- Imperium (2010)

Live albums

- Live 120798 (1999)

Video albums

- Live Decennium (DVD, 2010)

Extended plays

- Kneeling Between Shields (2009)
- Spin Automatic (2010)

Singles

- "Believe" (1995)
- "She Don't Know" (1995)
- "The Last Sound" (2010)

Music videos

- "Believe" (Lonely House, 1995)
- "Peace" (Flying, 1997)

Demo albums

- Grammatrain cassette (1994)
- Grammatrain CD (1994)
