= Whitney Mongé =

American musical artist (born 1987)

- Born: January 16, 1987 (age 39); Kennewick, Washington, U.S
- Genres: Singer/Songwriter, R&B, Blues, Soul, Americana
- Occupation: Musician
- Instruments: Acoustic Guitar, Electric Guitar
- Years active: 2008–present
- Website: whitneymonge.com

Whitney Mongé (born 16 January 1987) is an American singer, songwriter, and guitarist. Mongé is based out of Seattle, Washington. She began her career busking at Pike Place Market in 2007. She has since released three self-produced EPs, a live album with The Seattle Symphony, and two singles.

== Background ==
Mongé moved from her hometown Spokane, Washington 2007 and began her music career busking at Pike Place Market. As a result, she appeared in the award-winning documentary Find Your Way: A Busker's Documentary (2014), featuring Chris Ballew of The Presidents of the United States of America and world renowned violinist Joshua Bell. Mongé also and acted in, and provided music for, the short film Stella (2010). Mongé also appeared on season 2, episode 206, of the television program Band in Seattle (2015). Her band included Anthony Cammarota on guitar, Christian Liebig on bass, Matthew Singler on drums, and Rachael Beaver on cello. Here, she performed songs "Crash" and "Out" off of her first EP Steadfast (2014), as well as "Get Gone", which would be released as part of her Stone EP (2016) two years later.

Mongé has three EPs, all independently released. Steadfast (2014) was produced by Grammy Award winner, Pete Stewart. Stone (2016) was self-produced as well, and recorded by Stone Gossard of Pearl Jam's recording Studio Litho. Carry On (2018) was self produced, and recorded at Robert Lang Studios and Studio Litho in Seattle. She released a live album with Grammy Award winning orchestra, the Seattle Symphony titled Whitney Mongé Live with The Seattle Symphony in 2021. Mongé served as a governor for two terms (2018–2022) on the Pacific Northwest Recording Academy Chapter Board.

== Discography ==
=== Albums ===
Title	Details
Whitney Mongé Live with the Seattle Symphony	Released: 27 August 2021; Label: Independent; Format: Digital download, streaming

=== Extended Plays (EPs) ===
Title	Details
Steadfast	Released: 10 September 2014; Label: Self-released; Format: Digital download, streaming
Stone	Released: 15 January 2017; Label: Self-released; Format: Digital download, streaming
Carry On	Released: 27 November 2018; Label: Self-released; Format: Digital download, streaming

=== Singles ===
Title	Details
Around Christmas Time (Live)	Released: 16 December 2016; Label: Victory Studios Music; Format: Digital download, streaming
What Would Love Do Now	Released: 6 September 2024; Label: Self-released; Format: Digital download, streaming
