= Tait (band) =

American Christian rock band

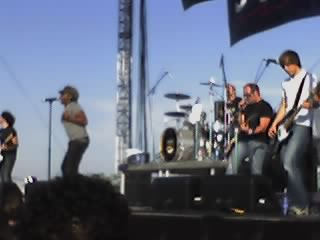
- Tait performing in 2006

Background information
- Origin: Nashville, Tennessee, U.S.
- Genres: Christian rock, CCM
- Years active: 2000-2007
- Label: ForeFront
- Past members: Michael Tait; Evan Wetherford; Jordan Hester; Chad Chapin; Peter Stewart; Justin York; Brian Nutter; Lonnie Chapin; Dave Clo
- Website: taitband.com

Tait was an American Christian rock band formed by Michael Tait, previously one of the members of DC Talk and later the lead singer of Newsboys.

== History ==
=== Pre-formation of Tait (1996–1999) ===
In 1996, DC Talk member Michael Tait met Chad Chapin and the two became close friends and began to write songs together. After a few years, Michael created his own cover band, a funky hard rock group named Curious George. He toured with Chapin and had a few concerts, performing music from Pearl Jam to King's X and The 77s. Afterward was when Tait and Chapin decided that they would eventually get a more permanent music group of their own together and tour the world.

Michael and Tait member Pete Stewart also had a friendship before the band's inception. After Stewart had assisted dc Talk by playing guitar on their album Supernatural, Tait and Stewart co-wrote the song "Uphill Battle" which was featured on ForeFront Records' Ten: The Birthday Album. When Stewart's alternative metal group Grammatrain disbanded in 1998, he went on to co-produce his own solo album with the help of Tait.

=== Empty (2000-2002) ===
When DC Talk went on hiatus in 2000, Michael started working unofficially with his own music. As his solo project slowly began to come together, Michael quickly thought of the friendships that within the past few years had become a fundamental part of his career. Pete Stewart came to join Michael, along with the Chapin brothers, Chad and Lonnie who in 1996 had moved to Nashville, Tennessee, to see where they could get in the music business. The band officially formed in 2000 and was named Tait after Michael's father, Rev. Nathel Tait.

After about a year in the studio, the band released their first album entitled Empty. It was generally well received, and the album even broke onto contemporary Christian music charts. The album featured songs that handled subjects like skepticism of others ("Spy"), racism ("American Tragedy") (this album was controversial because of the use of a racial slur in the middle of this song) and Michael's outpouring of grief of losing his father, sister and brother all in the same year ("Unglued").

=== Lose This Life (2003–2007) ===
After the release of the first album, Pete Stewart took his leave from the group. He was replaced by nineteen-year-old guitarist Justin York. Once again the band went into the recording studio in 2002 and worked through 2003 to release a new album. The group was successful, and in November they released Dove Award-winning Lose This Life.

The album proved that the group had matured into a much more aggressive hard rock sound compared to Empty’s more relaxed easy-listening music. Around the time the album was released, band members also participated in the production of !Hero, a rock opera which modernized the life and times of Jesus Christ.

Thee band has toured on and off from 2004 to 2006, many times with other CCM artists.

=== Hiatus (2007–2009) ===
Tait has not toured since October 6, 2007, and, on March 9, 2009, Michael Tait was officially announced as the lead singer of the popular Christian pop rock group Newsboys. Tait had initially planned to release a third album, Loveology, announced in 2006 that was to include music that was described as "Stevie Wonder meets Maroon 5 meets Lenny Kravitz." Music for this album including a song titled "Glimmer" was recorded, but the album remained unreleased as of 2009. In 2009, Tait said that he was still working on Loveology with, among others, Ben Moody.

== Discography ==
=== Albums ===
| Year | Title | Label(s) | Chart positions | |
| Year | Title | Label(s) | Top Christian Albums | Top Heatseekers |
|---|---|---|---|---|
| 2001 | Empty | ForeFront | 10 | — |
| 2003 | Lose This Life | ForeFront | 23 | 19 |
