= Peace of Mind (band) =

American Christian rapcore/nu metal band

- Origin: United States
- Genres: Rap rock
- Years active: 2003
- Labels: BEC
- Past members: KJ-52; Pete Stewart; Todd Collins; Rick May

Peace of Mind was a rap rock band composed of rapper KJ-52, rock artist Pete Stewart (now lead vocalist of Grammatrain), keyboardist/producer Todd Collins, and drummer Rick May. Songs were written and performed in hip hop form by KJ-52 before being edited by Stewart. Although the band's one self-titled album was not largely popular, it was well received among KJ-52's following. Another Peace of Mind album has been rumored, though KJ announced at his podcast that he will only consider writing another if opportunity comes, noting that his solo work is better received. The band was signed to BEC Recordings.

The band was a studio project with no true intentions to do anything beyond record the album. According to KJ, he and Drummer Rick "Mayday" May, never met in person and that two men on the cover, Devin Marlowe and F. Reid Shippen, were not a part of the band. Only KJ and Todd Collins were a part of the band on the album cover.

== Members ==
- KJ-52 – vocals (Soul Purpose)
- Pete Stewart – guitars, bass, backing vocals (Grammatrain)
- Todd Collins – programming, backing vocals (Soul Purpose)
- Rick May – drums

== Discography ==
- Peace of Mind (2003; BEC)
