= Corrin Campbell =

American singer-songwriter

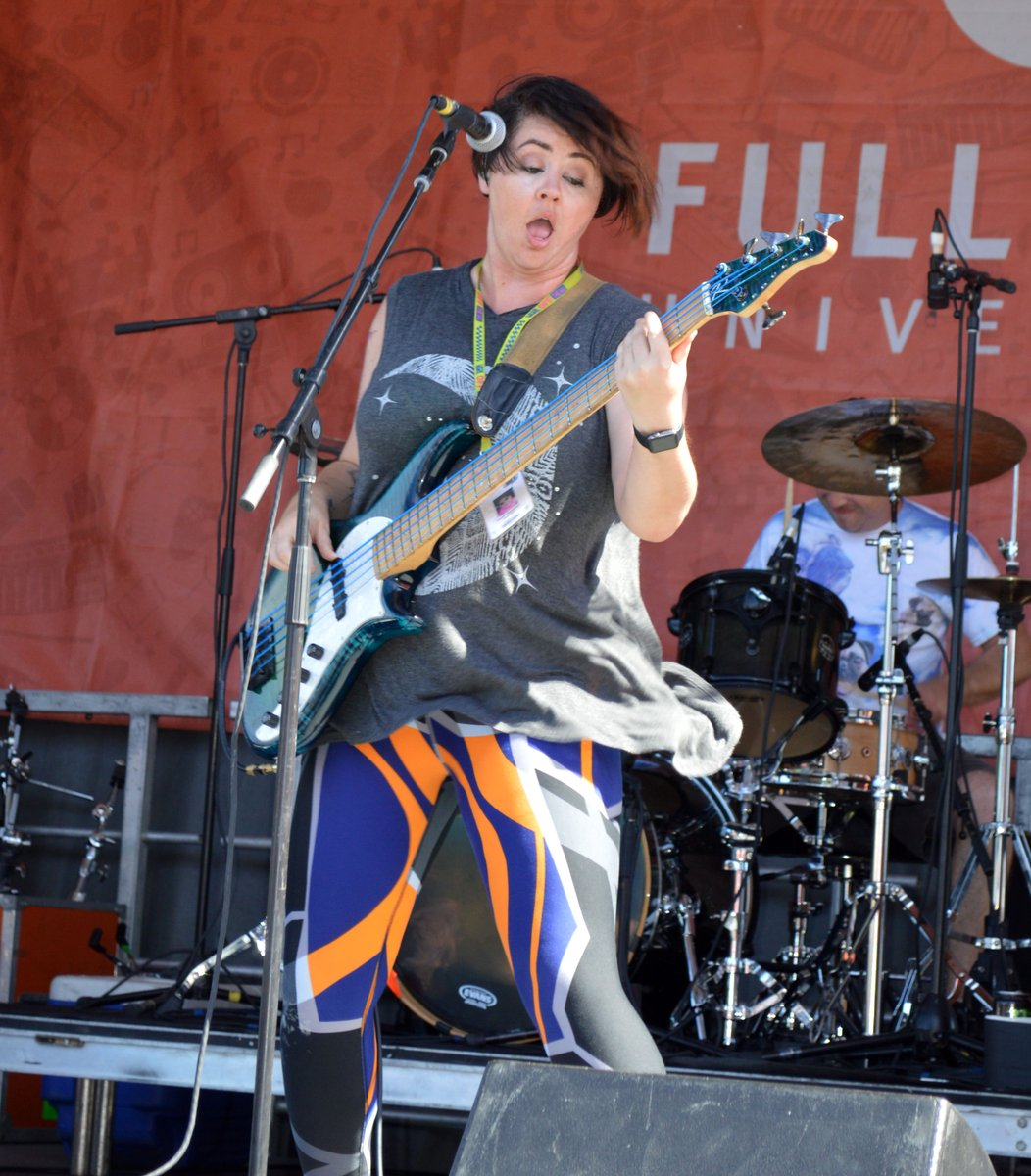

Background information
- Origin: Nashville, Tennessee, U.S.
- Genres: Alternative rock, rock
- Instruments: Vocals, bass, piano
- Years active: 2008–present
- Label: unsigned
- Website: corrincampbell.com

Corrin Campbell is a vocalist, bassist, songwriter, and entrepreneur. Corrin was an active-duty soldier in the United States Army, stationed with United States Army Recruiting Command at Fort Knox, KY from 2011 to 2017. Campbell was the only original music artist to be endorsed by a branch of the military. She is also a co-founder and the Director of Growth at Indepreneur.

== Biography ==
Hailing from Duluth, Minnesota, Corrin joined the United States Army and served as a bass guitar player and vocalist in the Army Band Field.

In addition to regular bandsman duties, she also participated in the 2003 U.S. Army Soldier Show: a 90-minute live musical review showcasing active duty soldiers. The show assembled in six weeks and then toured for 7 months in the continental United States, Cuba, and portions of Korea. Crowds would range from 100 to 13,000 people. During this time she was featured in promotional TV and radio interviews while on tour, and also performed behind Wynonna Judd at the 2003 Army Birthday Ball.

From 2004 to 2005, she deployed with the 1st Cavalry Division to Baghdad in Operation Iraqi Freedom II. As a lead singer of the rock group, band leader of the jazz combo, and bass player of the Latin band, nearly every day contained a musical mission. Most days consisted of travel by Blackhawk to entertain soldiers across Iraq. She was featured at many high-profile shows, including the farewell parties of General Ricardo Sanchez and Ambassador Paul Bremer. She also met and opened for Robin Williams, Ted Nugent and Toby Keith when their USO tours came through Baghdad.

Campbell served three years with the Maryland National Guard Band before returning to active duty in November 2009. She then served with the Army Materiel Command Band at Aberdeen Proving Ground in Maryland. It was while stationed here that Campbell was selected to play at Lilith Fair in Columbia, Maryland.

Campbell relocated to the Nashville, Tennessee area when the Army Materiel Command Band moved to Redstone Arsenal, Alabama in November 2010 and was employed as the featured artist with the U.S. Army Musical Outreach Team until March 2017.

On January 7, 2017, Campbell announced to her fans, the Campbell Corps, that her band, Dash|Ten, is breaking up, and that she was leaving the Army.

"First, Dash|Ten has come to an end. I (Corrin) am leaving the Army in just a couple months. I've had an incredible career and so many amazing opportunities. It is what brought me to you! However, Steve and Pete are staying in the Army to continue on, and that means we have to part ways." -Campbell

For a short stint, Campbell opted to rename her project PRYM and released an EP and toured to several states in Summer 2017. Shortly after, however, she released a statement on her site explaining the short-lived band name and stated she would be returning to her solo name.

== Solo Artist – Corrin Campbell (2018–present) ==
Corrin re-released PRYM's EP "At First Light" under her solo name on February 15, 2018. on August 14, 2017. She also released a single, entitled "Charlatan", one year later on February 18, 2019 and its BAD ONE remix on December 13, 2019. In February 2020, Corrin announced her Greatest Hits Dual Disc would include one "cinematic" disc and one "remix" disc, to be in full on January 8, 2021, with digital singles starting in April 2020.

== PRYM (2017–2018) ==
PRYM released its first single, "Lights", in March 2017. This single was followed by the "At First Light" EP, released on August 14, 2017. The EP also includes "What You Wanted" and "Our Time Now", songs previously released with Dash|Ten. Band members were never disclosed.

== Dash|Ten (2016–2017) ==
The band came together in early 2016, and their first public performance was the Warped Tour kick-off at Full Sail University in March 2016. All current members of the band are combat veterans of the U.S. Army, and the band is the only group officially backed by a branch of the military, touring and performing exclusively original music. The band's name comes from an Army term for a basic operating manual for equipment. "We consider our musical sound as the basics of rock – just a power trio with no AutoTune, very little edits, not a lot of support tracks. We're rock at its basic level."

Dash|Ten was forced to drop off of the line-up of Warped Tour 2016 for uncited reasons. Corrin provided a quote to Rara's Farm, "Unfortunately we had to leave the tour unexpectedly after the Darien Center, NY show. We're broken up about it, and hoping it's something that can be remedied. Kevin has been super supportive of us and let us know that we're welcome to come back if and when the Army works it all out."

=== Band members ===
- Steve Ebert (Guitar)
- Pete Greenberg (Drums)

On January 7, 2017, Campbell announced in her fan email list, Campbell Corps, that she is leaving the Army in 2017, and because Ebert and Greenberg are still in, they will be parting ways.

== Corrin Campbell and The Election (2008–2015) ==
Campbell transitioned from her solo artist name to Corrin Campbell & the Election in 2008, though all current releases are still listed under her solo name. Based in Baltimore, the band played mostly small local shows in the region until being selected to open Lilith Fair 2010 in Columbia, MD and dissolved into Campbell's Army position upon her selection for Army Musical Outreach.

=== Band members ===
- Tony Corbett (Drums, Mixing/Mastering)
- Jim Boyer (Guitar)

== Live Performances ==
- PRYM Summer Tour – June 29 – July 10
- Warped Tour 2016 – with Dash|Ten -First 18 dates through Darien Center, NY
- Warped Tour 2015 – All U.S. dates – June 19 – August 8, 2015
- 2015 Santa Susana High School – Simi Valley, CA
- Warped Tour 2014 – June 17–29, July 18–29
- 2014 & 2009 RedGorilla Fest – Austin, TX
- Los Angeles Lakers – NBA National Anthem – November 17, 2013
- Golden State Warriors – NBA National Anthem – November 10, 2013
- Pittsburgh Steelers – Pre-game Fan Plaza and NFL National Anthem – November 10, 2013
- 2013 & 2012 Drum Corps International World Championships – Lucas Oil Stadium – Indianapolis, IN
- 2012 & 2011 Music City Bowl – LP Field – Nashville, TN
- Seattle Mariners – July 4, 2012
- Warped Tour 2012 – June 21–28, July 7, and July 20–25
- Atlanta Braves – Army Birthday, 2014 & Memorial Day, 2012
- Lilith Fair 2010 – Merriweather Post Pavilion – Columbia, MD
- 2010 Artscape – Baltimore, MD
- 2010 & 2009 Launch Music Conference – Lancaster, PA
- 2009 & 2008 Baltimore Music Conference – Baltimore, MD
- Singer-songwriter Cape May 2009 – Cape May, NJ
- 2010 & 2009 Unicity Festival – Salisbury, MD
- 2009 AtlantaFest – Atlanta, GA
- 2008 M.E.A.N.Y. Fest – New York City, NY

In 2014, Campbell appeared at select high schools, such as Cedar Cliff High School in Camp Hill, Pennsylvania, and its sister school, Red Land High School, in Lewisberry, Pennsylvania.

== Reviews ==
"PRYM is a band that deals in intensity; Corrin Campbell’s compelling vocals come from a very authentic and impassioned place, monolithic slabs of primordial guitars drive through the middle ground and the solid bass and back-beat create the perfect platform to hold it all together." – Dave Franklin of The Swindonian.

"Dash|Ten certainly show promise on their debut. Simply by merit of intentionally avoiding the "Paramore sound," they have a head start on the vast majority of their contemporary female-fronted acts." – Randy Shatkowski of AntiHero Magazine.

"The ten track album is a full bodied music work of art that highlights their raw energy and passion for their music." – Marisol of Music Junkie Press.

"Finding an original sound in the female pop/rock world is a hard task, but it doesn't seem that way for Corrin Campbell. Her music displays many sides of her natural talent as Campbell shifts from harder electric guitar rock to the softer side of piano ballads. She has successfully found her footing and one step at a time, is sure to reach to top of the mountain of musical success."
– Lisa Perron of Target audience Magazine

"'Exhibit A' is a CD with memorable tunes combined with appealing lyrics that you want to learn right away so you can sing along!"
– Alicia and the RadioIndy Review Team

"If her eight-song EP, Exhibit A, is any indication, we'll be hearing a lot more of Ms. Campbell in the coming years. Sweetly seductive vocals combine with girl-next-door good looks giver her an instant appeal for fans of the current crop of twenty-something female hitmakers. But it is her ability to turn of a phrase that lifts her above the crowd."
-Mike Parker of buddyhollywood.com

== Personal life ==
She graduated from Full Sail University and lives in Nashville, Tennessee. Campbell has been connected to Paramore lead vocalist Hayley Williams. In 2003, they met through a shared vocal coach and William's Twitter account as also identified her as a friend.

On August 14, 2012 "Thanks Corrin" trended worldwide on Twitter when she attended and updated fans on the Paramore show at the Pomona Fox Theater in Pomona, California.

== Discography ==
Campbell has released different albums under her solo name, Corrin Campbell & the Election, Dash | Ten, and PRYM from 2007 to present. She has stated all music in the future will be released under her solo name.

Campbell recorded the first portion of "Gilded" at Dark Horse Recording Studio in March 2012. Shae Padilla of KSM (band) was featured as a guitarist.

On April 2, via the band's official blog, Corrin also announced that the band would be recording more songs to complete "Gilded" for release May 21, 2013. It was also stated that the album would be released under "Corrin Campbell & the Election" instead of as a solo-artist record. The band released a single in the meantime entitled "Not for Sale" on June 5, 2012.

=== Greatest Hits – January 8, 2020 ===
Two discs: One "cinematic" and one remix containing new recording and arrangements of songs ranging Corrin's complete discography. Volume 1: Cinematic

1. Our Time Now (Orchestral Version)
2. Pieces (Orchestral Version)
3. Find Your Way (Orchestral Version)
4. Sunbeam (Cello Version)
5. Ready, Set... (Cello Version) (feat. Pete Stewart)
6. Time to Let Go (Acoustic Version)
7. Remember Me (Orchestral Version)
8. What You Wanted (Orchestral Version)
9. Not for Sale (Orchestral Version)

Volume 2: The Remixes

1. What You Wanted (BAD ONE Remix)
2. Our Time Now (BAD ONE Remix)
3. Pieces (BAD ONE Remix)
4. Sunbeam (kkami Remix)
5. Not for Sale (BAD ONE Remix)
6. Heavy (BAD ONE Remix)
7. Remember Me (BAD ONE Remix)
8. Time to Let Go (BAD ONE Remix)
9. Ready, Set... (BAD ONE Remix)
10. Find Your Way (BAD ONE Remix)

=== At First Light [Re-Release] – February 15, 2018 ===
This re-release of the "At First Light" EP contained all songs previously released under PRYM.

1. What You Wanted
2. Exit Strategy
3. Lights
4. Flames & Games
5. Our Time Now

=== At First Light – August 14, 2017 ===
This debut release from PRYM contains two songs previously released under the Dash|Ten name.

1. What You Wanted
2. Exit Strategy
3. Lights
4. Flames & Games
5. Our Time Now

=== Dash | Ten – May 21, 2016 ===
The Dash|Ten album contains a good deal of Corrin's previously released material from her 2013 album "Gilded". This album was licensed free to the U.S. Army and the band has operated as a non-profit in support of the Army.

1. What You Wanted
2. The Scene
3. Where I Stand
4. Not for Sale
5. Pieces
6. Sunbeam
7. Truth
8. Truly Untitled
9. Heavy
10. Equations

=== Gilded – May 21, 2013 ===
1. You Guys Ready?
2. Just Around the Bend
3. Not for Sale
4. Ready, Set... (feat. Pete Stewart)
5. The Scene
6. Truth
7. Pieces
8. Truly Untitled
9. Heavy
10. Equations
11. The Call (feat. Pete Stewart)

=== Where I Stand (SP) – November 6, 2012 ===
1. Where I Stand
2. Remember Me (Punk Remix feat. Ethan Luck)

=== Game Night (Remixed/Remastered) – November 24, 2010 ===
1. Sunbeam
2. Blink of an Eye
3. Find Your Way
4. Always Be
5. Drone
6. Done With You
7. Remember Me
8. Apologize [a cover of OneRepublic's Apologize (song)]
9. Colors of You
10. Time to Let Go
11. Keep Movin'
12. A New Page

=== Game Night (Original) – November 24, 2009 ===
1. Find Your Way
2. Time to Let Go
3. Always Be
4. Drone
5. Done with You
6. Remember Me
7. Colors of You
8. Bounce
9. Apologize [a cover of OneRepublic's Apologize (song)]
10. Sunbeam
11. Blink of an Eye
12. Keep Movin'
13. Cast it Off
14. A New Page

=== Exhibit A (EP) ===
1. Colors of You
2. Friend in D
3. Cast It Off
4. Through Your Eyes
5. Shame
6. Keep Movin'

=== Exhibit A – Limited Edition (EP) ===
1. Colors of You
2. Friend in D
3. Cast It Off
4. Through Your Eyes
5. Shame
6. Keep Movin'
7. When It Rains [Piano cover of Paramore's "When it Rains"]
8. Snow (Acoustic)

=== Singles ===
1. Charlatan (feat. Nino Bless) – Released February 18, 2019
2. Lights – Released March 27, 2017
3. Our Time Now – Released Jun 2016
4. What You Wanted – Released Jun 2015
5. Where I Stand – Released Nov 2012
6. Not for Sale (Single Version) – Released Jun 2012
7. Sunbeam (Single Version) – Released Nov 2008
