= Bob Farrell (minstrel singer) =

American singer

"Turkey in the Straw"
"Turkey in the Straw" performed by the United States Air Force Band

Bob Farrell was an American, New York City-based blackface minstrel singer, best known for introducing the song "Zip Coon" at the Bowery Theatre in 1834, which later gave the tune to "Turkey in the Straw", one of the most famous and widespread songs of the era. "Zip Coon"'s authorship is disputed with George Washington Dixon.
