= Empty (Tait album) =

Studio album by Tait
- Released: July 3, 2001
- Recorded: 2000–2001
- Genre: Christian rock
- Label: ForeFront
- Producer: Pete Stewart, Michael Tait

Tait chronology
Empty (2001)	Lose This Life (2003)

Professional ratings
Review scores
Source	Rating
AllMusic	3/5 stars
Jesus Freak Hideout	4/5 stars

Empty is the debut studio album by American Christian rock band Tait and was the first of three solo albums released by members of dc Talk following their 2001 hiatus to work on solo projects. This album features Pete Stewart from Grammatrain, who is absent in the next album. Several songs are influenced by the passing of Michael Tait's late father Nathel, for whom the band is named.

The advance pre-release copy for this album contained slightly different mixes to the released CD and omitted the track "Altars" as well as both hidden tracks. "Altars" is the only song from this album to be turned into a music video; "Loss For Words" was featured on the soundtrack for the movie Extreme Days.

There are two hidden tracks on this CD, one an instrumental piece that appears after the closing track "Unglued," the other in the pregap (or "zero" index) before the opening track "Alibi," which can be accessed by pressing the 'rewind' button on the CD player when track one begins. The disc scans back 6 minutes and 48 seconds into negative numbers revealing answering machine messages with Michael Tait doing various character impersonations. There is also a short joke-oriented piece in this hidden track.

== Track listing ==
Album release
No.	Title	Writer(s)	Length
1.	"Alibi"	Michael Tait, Pete Stewart	4:13
2.	"Loss for Words"	Mario Santana, Tait, Randy Crawford	4:16
3.	"Bonded"	Tait, Chad Chapin, Dave Villano, Crawford	4:35
4.	"All You Got"	Tait, Chapin, Toby McKeehan	4:39
5.	"Spy"	Aaron Julison, Chapin, Tait	4:32
6.	"Talk About Jesus"	Daniel Joseph, Larry Norman, Tait	5:01
7.	"American Tragedy"	Mario Santana, Tait, Stewart, Crawford, McKeehan	3:30
8.	"Looking for You"	Chapin, Tait, Stewart	6:34
9.	"Altars"	Cort Langeland, Jim Hanon, Tait, Stewart	4:11
10.	"Tell Me Why"	Chapin, Mark Heimermann, Tait, Ormel Chapin	5:13
11.	"Carried Away"	Chapin, Kevin Max, Tait, Stewart, McKeehan	4:50
12.	"Empty"	Chapin, Tait	3:41
13.	"Unglued"	Joseph, Tait	6:10
Total length:			67:00

== Personnel ==
Tait

- Michael Tait – vocals
- Pete Stewart – keyboards, programming, guitars
- Lonnie Chapin – bass
- Chad Chapin – drums

Additional musicians

- Carl Herrgesell – keyboards
- Mike Linney – programming
- Michael W. Smith – piano (13)
- John Mark Painter – string arrangements
- The Love Sponge Orchestra – strings

Production

- Michael Tait – producer
- Pete Stewart – producer, engineer
- Mark Heimmerman – additional vocal production (4, 7, 10)
- Greg Ham – executive producer
- Mark Nicholas – executive producer, A&R direction
- F. Reid Shippen – engineer, mixing (5, 8, 11)
- Dan Shike – additional engineer
- Todd Robbins – additional engineer, mixing (13)
- Chris Lord-Alge – mixing (1, 3, 7)
- Bryan Lenox – mixing (4, 12)
- Brian Tankersley – mixing (6, 10)
- Shawn Andrews – digital editing
- Ted Jensen – mastering at Sterling Sound, New York City
- Richard Dodd – additional mastering
- Scott McDaniel – art direction
- Room 120 – artwork, design
- Kristin Barlowe – photography
- Woodland Sound Studios, Nashville, Tennessee – recording location
- The Dungeon Studios, Nashville, Tennessee – recording location
- Fun Attic Studio, Franklin, Tennessee – recording location
