= Lose This Life =

Studio album by Tait
- Released: November 4, 2003
- Recorded: 2002–2003
- Genre: Christian rock
- Label: ForeFront, Epic Japan, Sony BMG Philippines
- Producer: Mark Heimermann; Michael Tait; Matt Bronlewee; Chad Chapin; Brown Bannister

Tait chronology
| Empty (2001) | Lose This Life (2003) |

Professional ratings
Review scores
| Source | Rating |
|---|---|
| AllMusic | 3/5 stars |

Lose This Life is the second and final studio album by American Christian rock band Tait. According to frontman Michael Tait, the songs all have to do with the striving human passion to know, feel and experience God's love.

It was released by ForeFront Records on November 4, 2003. It was later released to the Japanese market on April 15, 2004, through Epic Records Japan and on March 27, 2005, through Sony BMG Music Entertainment Philippines.

Rob Beckley, lead singer of the alternative rock band Pillar, appears in the second song "Numb". "Lose This Life" is the single that had been released in the U.S. release of Eyeshield 21. On streaming services, the album has been blocked off for unknown reasons. Their first album has not been blocked.

== Recording and production ==
Pre-production for Lose This Life began during the first week of March 2003.

== Track listing ==
Album release
| No. | Title | Writer(s) | Length |
|---|---|---|---|
| 1. | "Lose This Life" | Chad Chapin, Mark Heimermann, Michael Tait | 5:00 |
| 2. | "Numb" (featuring Rob Beckley) | Heimermann, Toby McKeehan, Tait | 3:49 |
| 3. | "Electric Avenue" | Eddy Grant | 3:26 |
| 4. | "Fallen" | Chapin, Wayne Kirkpatrick, Tait | 4:21 |
| 5. | "God Can You Hear Me" | Chapin, Ashley Clark, Heimermann, Tait | 5:11 |
| 6. | "Reconnecting" | Heimermann, Judson Spence, Tait | 3:41 |
| 7. | "Child" | Chapin, Heimermann, Tait | 4:22 |
| 8. | "Heartache" | Heimermann, Tait | 5:12 |
| 9. | "Free Will" | Chapin, Lonnie Chapin, Paul Colman, Heimermann, Tait, Justin York | 3:55 |
| 10. | "Wait" | Chapin, Heimermann, Tait | 3:31 |
| 11. | "Holding out for Grace" | Chapin, Tait | 5:01 |
| 12. | "The Christmas Song" | Mel Tormé, Robert Wells | 4:33 |
| Total length: | | | 56:21 |

"Lose This Life" appeared on Gundam Seed, Gran Turismo 4, MahaGoGo, and the U.S. version of Eyeshield 21.

== Music video ==
The title track, "Lose This Life", is the only song so far to have spawned a music video.

== Personnel ==
Tait

- Michael Tait – vocals
- Justin York – guitars
- Lonnie Chapin – bass
- Chad Chapin – drums

Additional musicians

- Mark Heimermann
- Matt Bronleewe
- Paul Moak
- Jerry McPherson
- Adam Lester
- Jay Johnson
- Javier Solis
- Todd Robbins
- Rob Beckley (from Pillar) – lead vocals (2)
- Carl Marsh – orchestra arrangements (12)
- Gavyn Wright – concertmaster (12)
- The London Session Orchestra – orchestra (12)

Production

- Michael Tait – producer (1–11)
- Mark Heimermann – producer (1, 2, 4–10)
- Matt Bronleewe – producer (3)
- Chad Chapin – producer (11)
- Brown Bannister – producer (12)
- Brent Milligan – executive producer, A&R direction
- Charlie Peacock – A&R direction
- Todd Robbins – engineer, mixing (1, 3, 8, 9, 11, 12)
- Glen Spinner – engineer
- Shane D. Wilson – engineer
- Michael H. Brauer – mixing (2, 4–7, 10)
- Steve Bishir – recording (12)
- Grant Greene – assistant engineer
- Greg Lawrence – assistant engineer
- Melissa Mattey – assistant engineer
- Chris Barnett – assistant engineer (12)
- Tracy Martinson – digital editing (12)
- Greg Calbi – mastering (1–11)
- Doug Sax – mastering (12)
- Amy Guenthner – A&R coordinator
- PJ Heimmerman – production manager (1, 2, 4–10)
- Shawn Andrews – production coordinator
- Susannah Parrish – creative coordinator
- Scott McDaniel – art direction
- Room 120 – design
- Danny Clinch – photography
- Jennifer Catron – artist development
