= Julia Brown (prostitute) =

American prostitute and brothel madam

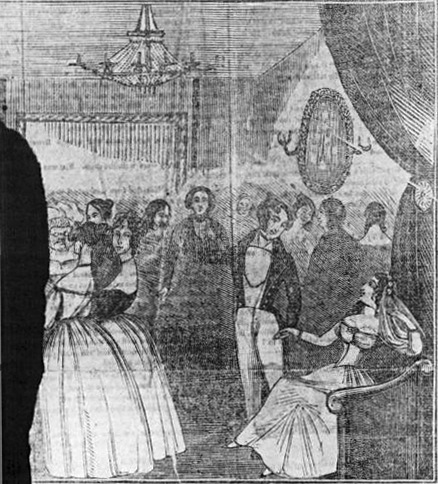
- "A Grand Ball with Julia Brown", from the New York Flash, 1843
- Other names: Princess Julia
- Occupations: Prostitute, brothel madam
- Years active: 1830s-1860s

Julia Brown (died after 1860) was an American madam and prostitute active in mid-nineteenth century New York City. Brown has been described as "the best-known prostitute in antebellum America". Brown was known for playing the piano in her brothel and for being a guest at functions hosted by the best families in New York. She also had season ticket to two theaters, paid for pews in various churches and contributed generously to local bible societies. She became a popular subject of tourist guidebooks, and her name appears often in diaries from the period.

== Brothel-keeping ==
In the 1830s, Brown entered a brothel run by Rosina Townsend, and later a house owned by Adeline Miller, a well-known New York madam, in Miller Street, eventually becoming the manager of the house. She did not stay long, however; soon Brown was running a brothel of her own at 133 Reade Street. After a complaint from a neighbor, she was charged with common bawdy house. She pleaded guilty and shut the Reade Street premises, but continued to run brothels on Chapel, Church and Leonard Streets. Brown popularized the brothel ball, which were a risqué masked parties attended by some of New York's elite. These balls were well reported in the press. The Dixon's Polyanthos, a weekly with a circulation of around 10,000, carried a story on "Princess Julia's Palace of Love" in June 1841.

The Leonard Street brothel was partially destroyed when the neighboring National Theater burnt down in 1841, and the rear wall of the theater collapsed on the brothel. A young woman, Margaret Yahgar, was killed by the fire that spread into the Brothel. Yahgar had left her parents home in Philadelphia a few days before to "board" with Brown. Brown allegedly sent her employees to save furniture and decor from the burning building. These were used to furnish her new “two thousand dollar parlor house" at another property in Leonard Street. The new brothel in Leonard Street became one of the most famous brothel in New York City, Fanny White, a.k.a. Jane Augusta Blankman once worked there.

Vigilantes frequently violently targeted brothels in the area. Brown's brothel in Chapel Street was attacked in 1834, and following another attack in 1840, two men were found guilty of assaulting Brown and her prostitutes.

As the Lower West Side pushed north, Brown moved with it. By the 1860s, Brown was running a stylish brothel at the corner of University Place and 12th Street. Her neighbours included James Lenox, William H. Aspinwall, the socialite Mrs Peter A. Schemerhorn and New York Public Library. The brothel was tolerated because the house and her customers caused no disruption.

== Social acceptance ==
Despite her illicit occupation, Brown was a darling of the New York upper class. She received invitations to social galas across New York City, and her admirers nicknamed her Princess Julia. She sometimes threw balls of her own in the winter as a way to attract new patrons. Charles Dickens reportedly visited her on a trip through America. The penny press also followed her exploits; the major criticism levied against her was that the cut she took from her girls' earnings was too large. She was reputed to be worth $11,500.

== Bibliography ==
- Anon (1860). The Life and Death of Fanny White: Being a Complete and Interesting History of the Career of That Notorious Lady. New York.
- Chadwick, Bruce (22 April 2017). "When New York City was the prostitution capital of the US". New York Post.
- Caldwell, Mark (2005). New York Night: The Mystique and Its History. Simon and Schuster. ISBN 978-0-7432-7478-4.
- Cott, Nancy F. (2011). Prostitution. Walter de Gruyter. ISBN 978-3-11-097636-6.
- Gilfoyle, Timothy J. (1994). City of Eros: New York City, Prostitution, and the Commercialization of Sex, 1790-1920. W. W. Norton & Company. ISBN 978-0-393-31108-2.
- Hill, Marilynn Wood (1993). Their Sisters' Keepers: Prostitution in New York City, 1830-1870. University of California Press. ISBN 978-0-520-07834-5.
- Robbins, Tom (5 May 2008). "The Flash Press Unearths a Pleasingly Salacious Era of New York City Sleaze". Village Voice. Archived from the original on 9 July 2008.
- Serratore, Angela (2013). A Preservationist's Guide to the Harems, Seraglios, and Houses of Love of Manhattan: The 19th Century New York City Brothel in Two Neighborhoods (MSc). Columbia University.
- Stein, Mark (2017). Vice Capades: Sex, Drugs, and Bowling from the Pilgrims to the Present. U of Nebraska Press. ISBN 978-1-61234-927-5.
