= Henry F. Harrington =

American newspaper editor

Henry F. Harrington was an American newspaper editor. He served as junior editor of the New England Galaxy under John Neal and as editor of the Boston Herald for part of the 1830s.

In 1837, Harrington delivered a message by train from Worcester to Boston, a distance of 45 miles. The trip took just under an hour. Martin, while appreciative of Harrington's determination, ridiculed his disheveled appearance: "... and in those days the engineer had so little protection from the sparks and dust, that Mr. Harrington presented a very comical appearance, as with that precious document, the President's Message, in his hand, he rushed from the depot to his office."

Harrington opposed George Washington Dixon during that editor's run of the Bostonian; or, Dixon's Saturday Night Express. When one of Harrington's reporters called Dixon a "knave" for allegedly fabricating a story about an elopement, Dixon struck back at Harrington, calling him "Little Harry, [editor] of the Penny Herald"" and depicting him as a monkey labeled "Little Harry the Great Unbeliever". Harrington retaliated by accusing Dixon of stealing half of a ream of pink paper from the Boston Post—the Herald's main competitor.

The Lowell Courier satirized the scene at Dixon's trial:

The first day of February will not hereafter be used in the almanacs as a dead blank—a dull, monotonous nothing. ... It was on this veritable day in the year of our Lord one thousand eight hundred and thirty seven, new style, at ten minutes and twenty three seconds past three o'clock in the afternoon, wind S.S.E., that George Washington Dixon, the American Melodist—the great Buffo Singer—the immortal Zip Coon himself—was brought before the Police Court, charged by his brother editor Henry F. Harrington (Esquire) with stealing half a ream of letter-paper from the office of the Morning Post.—We are thus particular about dates, that future chronologers and historians may be under no misapprehension relative to the positive commencement of this new era; an era that will be held in remembrances by the "sons of song" long after their great master spirit has gone off in a double shuffle to a place where all is "discord, harmony, not understood." (Pope.)

Harrington presented the prosecution's case himself. The judge dismissed the case and freed Dixon when he asserted that the identity of the guilty party could not be established beyond doubt.
