= Phoebe Doty =

American prostitute and madam

Phoebe Doty (died June 9, 1849) was an American prostitute and madam. In 1821, she started her career in a bordello in the Five Points neighborhood of New York City. Over the next three years, she accrued $600 in personal belongings. For the next decade or so, Doty moved from house to house, eventually settling in a brothel on Church Street. There she was valued at $800. Doty had an adopted daughter, Sal Wright, who also became a prostitute.

By 1839, Doty had opened her own brothel on Leonard Street. At decade's end, she was valued at $2000. During the 1840s, Doty was a prominent prostitute and madam. She held lavish balls at her brothel to attract new customers and to mingle with the upper classes. Her high profile earned her notoriety in the penny press. The Libertine suggested that Doty and another madam, Adeline Miller, should rent the Park Theatre and talk about their lives. It predicted that "the house would be crammed if the entrance was five dollars a head. The bigger the harlot now-a-days the more money is made."
