= Flying (Grammatrain album) =

Studio album by Grammatrain
- Released: July 6, 1997
- Studio: Ardent Music (Memphis, Tennessee)
- Genre: Christian rock; alternative rock; grunge
- Length: 46:10
- Label: ForeFront
- Producer: John Hampton

Grammatrain chronology
| Lonely House (1995) | Flying (1997) | Live 120798 (1999) |

Professional ratings
Review scores
| Source | Rating |
|---|---|
| AllMusic | 3/5 stars |
| Jesus Freak Hideout | 3/5 stars |
| Cross Rhythms | 9/10 squares |
| The Phantom Tollbooth | Review 1: Review 2: Review 3: Review 4: |

Flying is the second studio album by American rock band Grammatrain, released on July 6, 1997 on ForeFront Records. A music video was made for the song "Peace". The music video included on the WWJD (What Would Jesus Do?) compilation VHS in 1998 and the track "Pain" was included on the CD release of the WWJD compilation on November 4, 1997.

During an interview on Jesus Freaks: Vinyl to Digital in 2021, drummer Paul Joseph Roraback said Flying was recorded in two months.

== Track listing ==
All lyrics are written by Grammatrain; all music is composed by Grammatrain.

| No. | Title | Length |
|---|---|---|
| 1. | "Jonah^{[a]}" | 2:41 |
| 2. | "Less of Me^{[a]}" | 2:48 |
| 3. | "Flying^{[a]}" | 5:11 |
| 4. | "Rocketship" | 2:24 |
| 5. | "Peace" | 4:13 |
| 6. | "Pain^{[a]}" | 4:46 |
| 7. | "Sell Your Soul" | 3:22 |
| 8. | "Fuse^{[a]}" | 3:47 |
| 9. | "Spiderweb" | 3:16 |
| 10. | "Found In You" | 4:44 |
| 11. | "For Me^{[b]}" (song ends at 3:49 and is followed by five minutes of silence) | 8:49 |
| 12. | "Hidden Track^{1}" | 0:04 |
| Total length: | | 46:10 |

^{a} live recording appears on Live 120798 (1999)
^{a} live acoustic recording appears on Grammatrain demo CD (1994)

== Reception ==
Flying received mixed to positive reviews from critics. Alex Figgis of Cross Rhythms described the album as "carefully crafted so as to leave the listener in no doubt as to Grammatrain's faith in Christ, yet sensitive enough to lovingly challenge those left standing in the dark. Excellent." In 1999, "Pain" was nominated for the "Hard Music Recorded Song" award at the 30th Annual GMA Dove Awards.

== Personnel ==
Grammatrain

- Pete Stewart – vocals, guitar, piano, mellotron
- Dalton Roraback – bass guitar
- Paul Joseph Roraback – drums, percussion

Additional musicians

- Dana Roraback – tambourine ("Flying")
- Donna Stewart – tambourine ("For Me")

Production

- John Hampton – producer, engineer, mixer
- Dan R. Brock, Eddie DeGarmo – executive producers
- Matt Martone – engineer
- Jason Latshaw – assistant engineer
- Bil Brown – art direction, design, illustration
- Gary Taxali – cover wraparound illustration
- Karen Mason – photography
- Ken Love – mastering at MasterMix (Nashville, Tennessee)

== Notes ==
^{1.} Named "[Hidden Track]" on CD metadata and not written on the track listing; named "Pop" on digital releases.
