= Horace Poussard =

French musician

Horace Remi Poussard (11 June 1829 – 12 September 1898) was a French violinist and composer.

== Career ==
Poussard was born in Château-Gontier, the son of music teacher and conductor Charles Francois Poussard. He studied at the Conservatoire de Paris, graduating with the First Class prize in violin in 1849 with a performance of a Viotti Concerto (reviewed in La Vigie de l'Ouest, 14 September 1849). In the 1850s he began his career as a professional violinist with concerts in Paris, Vienna, and Constantinople. He also travelled through Hungary, Greece, Wallachia, and the British Isles. In 1860 he appeared in London, along with a fellow French cellist, René Douay. In 1861 Poussard and Douay sailed to Australia, and gave their first concerts there in Melbourne. They toured the goldfields and major towns in the states of Victoria and South Australia before going to the South Island of New Zealand. During this period, their repertoire consisted mainly of more popular pieces, easily recognised by the inhabitants of the newly emerging country. To commemorate the exploration (and death) of Burke and Wills on their journey across Australia, Poussard wrote The Dead Heroes, a musical poem of 17 stanzas incorporating well known existing tunes. The song was well received.

In 1864, Douay, who was suffering from a mental illness, "went mad" while in Melbourne and was shipped back to France, to remain in an asylum for the rest of his life. Poussard and a musical comedy singer named Florence Beverley (Florence Calzado) left Australia for a four-year tour of India and South Africa, linking up with Robert Smythe (a manager) and his wife Amelia Bailey (a soprano). The so-called Poussard-Bailey Opera Company gave more than 300 performances in this period as well as coping with the difficulties of travel by land and sea.

Poussard returned to France in December 1868 and continued performing in France and the British Isles. He played in the Royal Court of Empress Eugénie and with Giovanni Bottesini, the celebrated double-bass player. He married an Opera Comique singer, Louise Félicie Jean (Lottie Montal) in London in 1874 and in 1883 returned to Australia where they performed and where he increasingly taught piano and violin. His last tour was to New Zealand in 1890, and he died in Sydney in 1898.
