= Turkey in the Straw =

American folk song

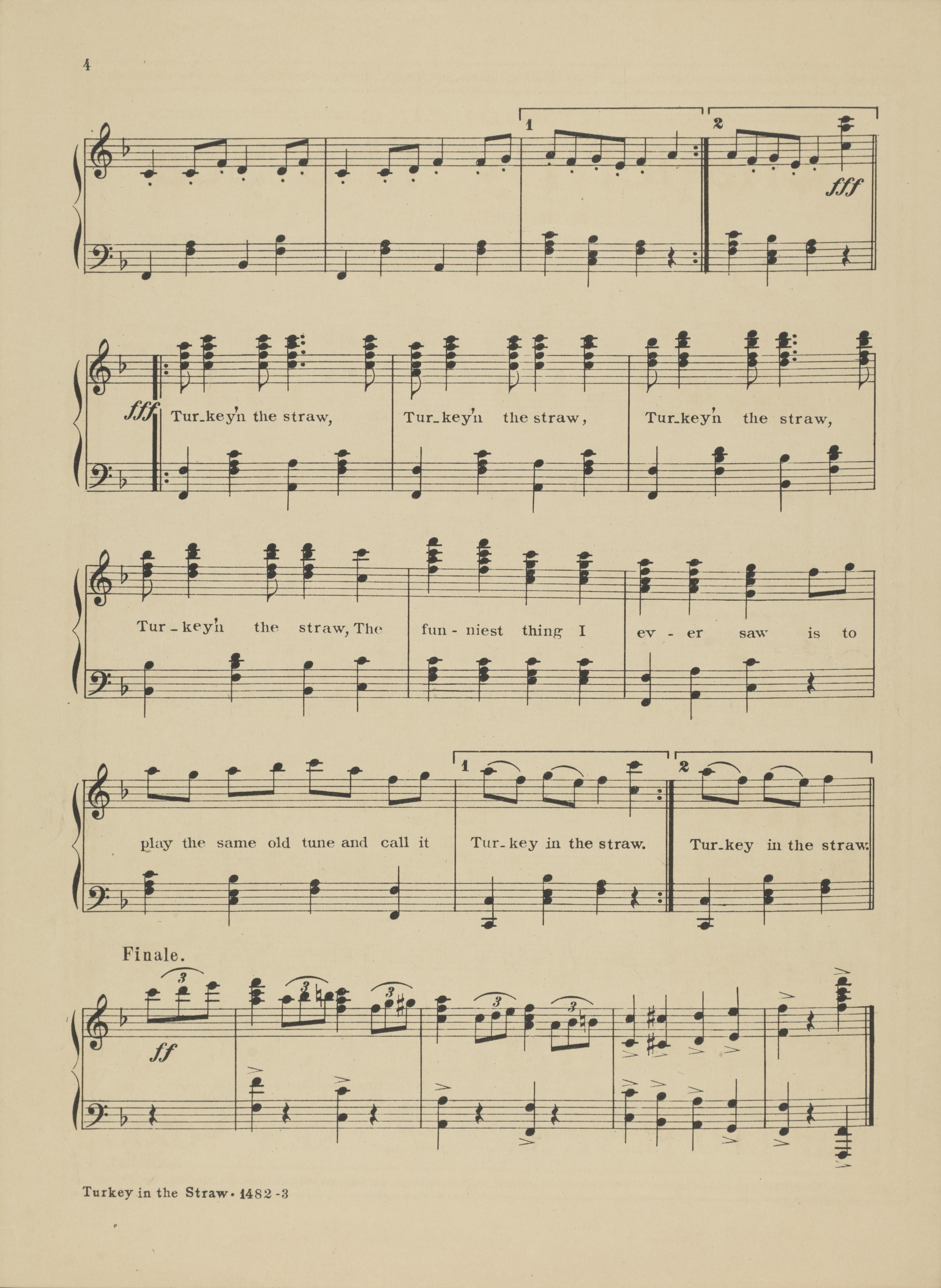
- Sheet music from 1899

Song
- Written: c. 1834
- Genre: American folk music, minstrel
- Songwriter: Traditional

"Turkey in the Straw"
A recording of "Turkey in the Straw" by Grant Raymond Barrett in 2005

"Chicken Reel/Turkey in the Straw medley"
"Chicken Reel/Turkey in the Straw medley" performed by the United States Air Force Band

"Turkey in the Straw" is an American folk song that first gained popularity in the 19th century. Early versions of the tune were titled "Zip Coon", which were first published around 1834 and performed in minstrel shows, with different people claiming authorship of the song. The melody of "Zip Coon" later became known as "Turkey in the Straw"; "Turkey in de Straw" was originally a song with different music, but it was published in 1861 together with the wordless music of "Zip Coon" added at the end, and in this way the title "Turkey in the Straw" became linked to the tune of "Zip Coon".

The song is related to a number of tunes of the 19th century and the origin of these songs has been widely debated. Links to older Irish/Scottish/English ballads have been proposed, such as "The Old Rose Tree". The song became highly popular and many variations of the song exist. It was also frequently adapted and used in popular media.

== Origin ==
"Turkey in the Straw" is thought to be originally a tune from 19th century minstrel shows, "Zip Coon" or "Old Zip Coon", published around 1834. The authorship of the song has been claimed by George Washington Dixon, who popularized the song, as well as Bob Farrell and George Nicholls. "Zip Coon" in turn has been linked to a number of 19th century folk songs believed to have older antecedents in Irish/Scottish/English folk songs. Songs proposed it has links to include "Natchez Under the Hill", "The Old Bog Hole", "The Rose Tree", "Sugar in the Gourd", "The Black Eagle", "Glasgow Hornpipe", "Haymaker's Dance", "The Post Office", "Old Mother Oxford", "Kinnegad Slasher" and others.

Eloise Hubbard Linscott believes the first part of the song is a contrafactum of the ballad "My Grandmother Lived on Yonder Little Green", published in 1857 by Horace Waters, which is in turn said to be a contrafactum of the Irish/Scottish/English ballad "The Old Rose Tree" published by at least 1795 in Great Britain. The link to "The Old Rose Tree" has been questioned, but a number of musicologists suggest that it may be a composite of "The Rose Tree" and "The (Bonny) Black Eagle". Similar tune was popular with fiddle players as early as 1820, and the tune of "Turkey in the Straw"/"Zip Coon" may have come from the fiddle tune "Natchez Under the Hill" believed to have been derived from "Rose Tree".

The title "Turkey in the Straw" later became associated with the tune of "Zip Coon" in an unusual way. According to James J. Fuld, Dan Bryant copyrighted a song with new lyrics and music titled "Turkey in the Straw" on July 12, 1861, but with the wordless music of "Zip Coon" (titled "Old Melody") attached at the end. The tune of "Zip Coon" then became known as "Turkey in the Straw".

== "Zip Coon" ==
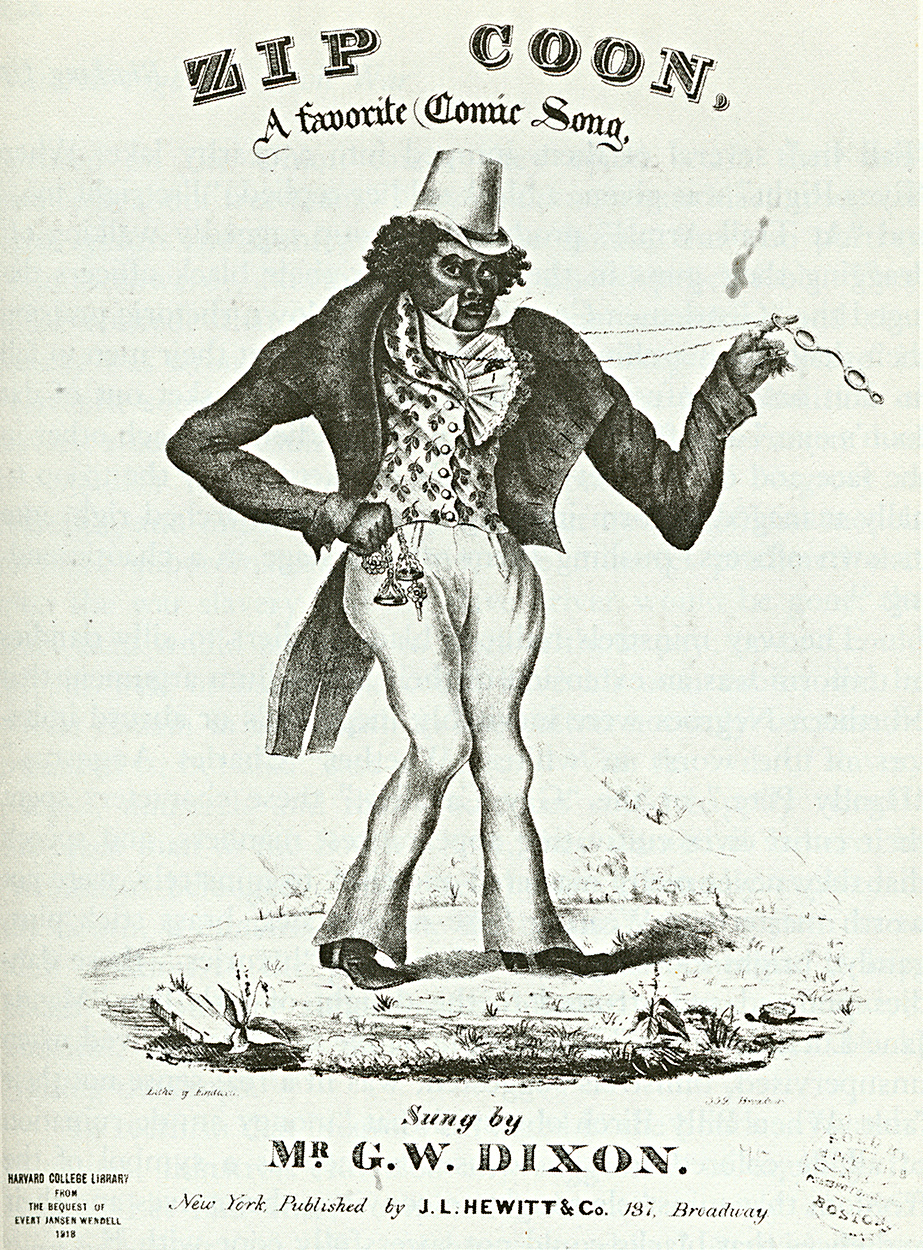
Front cover of a 1834 sheet music for "Zip Coon" by George Washington Dixon

The title of "Zip Coon" or "Old Zip Coon" was used to signify a dandified free black man in northern United States. "Zip" was a diminutive of "Scipio", a name commonly used for slaves. According to Stuart Flexner, "coon" was short for "raccoon" – by 1832 it referred to a frontier rustic, and by 1840 to a Whig who had adopted a coonskin cap as a symbol of white rural people. Although the song "Zip Coon" was published c.1830, at that time, "coon" was typically used to refer to someone white. It was only in 1848 that a clear use of the word "coon" to refer to a black person in a derogatory sense appeared. It is possible that the negative racial connotation of the word evolved from "Zip Coon" and the common use of the word "coon" in minstrel shows. Another suggested derivation of the word meaning a black person is barracoon, an enclosure for slaves in transit that was increasingly used in the years before the American Civil War. However, on the stage, "coon" could have been used much earlier as a black character was named Raccoon in a 1767 colonial comic opera.

The song was first performed by Bob Farrell, and popularized by George Washington Dixon in the 1830s. This version was first published between 1829 and 1834 in either New York or Baltimore. Dixon, and Bob Farrell and George Nicholls had separately claimed to have written the song, and the dispute has not been resolved. Ohio songwriter Daniel Decatur Emmett is sometimes erroneously credited as the song's author.

The song gave rise to the blackface minstrel show character Zip Coon.

=== Music and lyrics ===
"Zip Coon" has a vocal range of an octave and a minor sixth. Both the verse and the chorus end on the tonic, and both begin a major third above the tonic. In the verse, the highest note is a fifth above the tonic and the lowest is a minor sixth below. In the chorus, the highest note is an octave above the last note, and the lowest is the last note itself. The song stays in key throughout.

"Zip Coon" has many different lyrical versions. Thomas Birch published a version in 1834, while George Washington Dixon published a version called "Ole Zip Coon" with different lyrics circa 1835. Both Birch's and Dixon's versions keep the same chorus and the first four stanzas:

(3×) O ole Zip Coon he is a larned skoler,
Sings posum up a gum tree an coony in a holler.
(3×) Posum up a gum tree, coony on a stump,
Den over dubble trubble, Zip coon will jump.

Chorus

O Zip a duden duden duden zip a duden day.
O Zip a duden duden duden duden duden day.
O Zip a duden duden duden zip a duden day.
Zip a duden duden duden zip a duden day.

O ist old Suky blue skin, she is in lub wid me
I went the udder arter noon to take a dish ob tea;
What do you tink now, Suky hab for supper,
Why chicken foot an posum heel, widout any butter.

Chorus

Did you eber see the wild goose, sailing on de ocean,
O de wild goose motion is a berry pretty notion;
Ebry time de wild goose, beckens to de swaller,
You hear him google google google google gollar.

Chorus

I went down to Sandy Hollar t other arternoon
And the first man I chanced to meet war ole Zip Coon;
Ole Zip Coon he is a natty scholar,
For he plays upon de Banjo "Cooney in de hollar".

In subsequent stanzas, both lyricists talk about events in the life of Andrew Jackson, Birch of President Jackson's battle with the Second Bank of the United States and Dixon of General Jackson at the Battle of New Orleans. When the Mexican–American War began, Dixon published a new version of "Zip Coon" with updated lyrics pertaining to the war:

And spite of any rumors
We'll vanquish all the Montezumas!

Ken Emerson, author of the 1997 book Doo-dah!: Stephen Foster And The Rise Of American Popular Culture, believes that the chorus "O Zip a duden duden duden zip a duden day" influenced the song "Zip-a-Dee-Doo-Dah" in Walt Disney's 1946 adaptation of Joel Chandler Harris' Uncle Remus tales, Song of the South.

Another version of "Old Zip Coon" with new self-referencing lyrics by David K. Stevens (1860–1946) was published in the Boy Scout Song Book (1920). Stevens' lyrics contain no direct racial references other than the title of the song itself:

There once was a man with a double chin,
Who played with skill on a violin:
And he played in time and he played in tune,
But he never played anything but 'Old Zip Coon'.

== "Nigger Love a Watermelon, Ha! Ha! Ha!" ==
"Nigger Love a Watermelon, Ha! Ha! Ha!"
1916 recording of "Nigger Love A Watermelon, Ha! Ha! Ha!" by Harry C. Browne

"Nigger Love a Watermelon, Ha! Ha! Ha!" is a 1916 adaptation of "Turkey in the Straw", performed by Harry C. Browne and produced by Columbia Records. It has since been named the most racist song title in the United States for its use of watermelon stereotypes.

The song was released in March 1916. It was performed by the silent movie actor Harry C. Browne. It was released with "Old Dan Tucker" as a B-side. The music for it was based upon "Turkey in the Straw" and performed with Browne singing baritone whilst playing a banjo with orchestral accompaniment. A contemporary review in July 1916 called it: "... a treat to tickle the musical palates of those who love to listen to the old-time slave-day river songs". Columbia Records continued to promote it up to 1925. The song used racist stereotypes in it with Browne describing watermelons as "colored man's ice-cream".

Radio DJ Dr. Demento, who had played older songs with racial overtones on the radio, refused to ever play this song because he felt that the title showed it was always intended to be hateful. In 2014, Dr. Theodore R. Johnson asserted that the jingle used by many ice cream trucks in the United States was based upon this song. It has been argued that this allegation is incorrect, as the "Turkey in the Straw" tune had been used long before this song was created. Nevertheless, because of the association, a number of American ice cream truck companies ceased to use the "Turkey in the Straw" melody for their jingles, with Good Humor and RZA collaborating to produce a new jingle.

== Performance history ==
The early Mickey Mouse cartoon Steamboat Willie which prominently features "Turkey in the Straw"

- In 1928, this was used as the base melody in the famous early Mickey Mouse cartoon Steamboat Willie. The rendering of the tune in the cartoon is noted for being one of the first instances of successful synchronization in animated films.
- The 1990s animated television series Animaniacs used the tune for "Wakko's America", in which Wakko names all 50-state capitals in the form of a song.
- In 1942, Carson Robison performed an anti-Axis Powers version of "Turkey in the Straw".

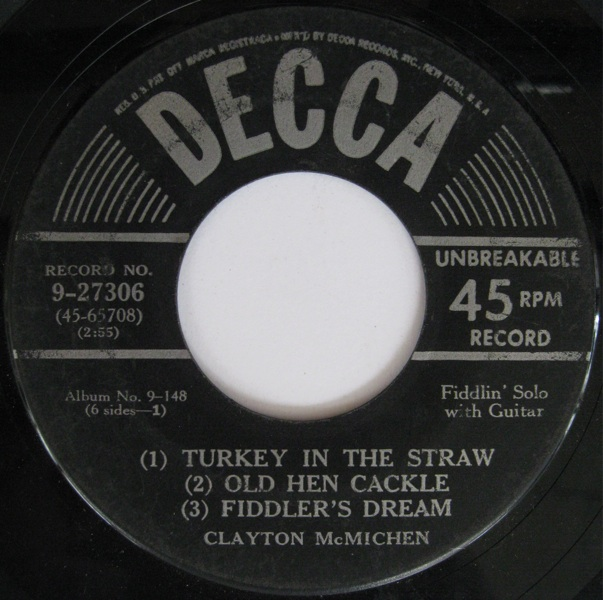
Phonograph record version by Clayton McMichen.

- In 1909, the composer Charles Ives incorporated the tune, along with other vernacular American melodies, into his orchestral Symphony No. 2.
- According to survivors, "Turkey in the Straw" was among songs played by the band of the RMS Titanic at one point during the sinking on April 14 and 15, 1912.
- In 1926, "Turkey in the Straw" was recorded by the old-time band Gid Tanner & His Skillet Lickers with Riley Puckett. The full melody is quoted in a fiddle and whistling solo in the "Skip to My Lou" number from the 1944 musical film Meet Me in St. Louis starring Judy Garland.
- The melody is played by many ice cream trucks.
- In the 1953 short "Two Little Indians" of Tom and Jerry, in order to disguise their retreat, Jerry plays this song with a "violin", which is made by a bow and an arrow.
- The tune has been made into songs like I Had A Little Chick or Do Your Ears Hang Low?

== See also ==
- "Chicken Reel"
- Coon song
- "Do Your Ears Hang Low?"
- "Unsquare Dance"
