= Farrell and Farrell =

Contemporary Christian music husband and wife duo

- Origin: Houston, Texas
- Genres: CCM, gospel, pop, new wave
- Years active: 1977–1991
- Labels: NewPax, Star Song, DaySpring
- Past members: Bob Farrell; Jayne Farrell
- Website: farrellandfarrell.net

Farrell and Farrell was a contemporary Christian music husband and wife duo formed in 1977 by Bob and Jayne Farrell. They released seven studio albums and one live album between 1977 and 1989 and amassed many Christian radio hits during those times. Bob Farrell was the principal songwriter of the duo and, outside of Farrell and Farrell, wrote songs for many CCM and mainstream artists, like Sandi Patty, Amy Grant, Eric Clapton, Anne Murray, Laura Branigan and DeGarmo and Key.

== History ==
=== Early years, Jesus Movement and the beginning of Farrell and Farrell ===
The duo released their debut album Farrell & Farrell in 1978. Their first single, "Earthmaker," became a Top 5 hit on Christian radio.

After their second and third albums A Portrait of Us All and Make Me Ready were released in the late 1970s and early 1980s, Farrell and Farrell released their live album Let the Whole World Know – Live in 1982 and was co-produced by Eddie DeGarmo of the Christian rock duo DeGarmo and Key. According to CCM Magazine, "the duo had one of the most sophisticated early techno-pop live shows on the road with heavy keyboard and electronic effects driving the musical sound."

=== Star Song years (1984–1987) ===
Farrell and Farrell began their next chapter in Christian music as they signed with Star Song Records in 1984 and released their next album called Choices. The album was a new direction in their sound introducing new wave music to the Christian music audience, along with alternative Christian rock artist Steve Taylor who released Meltdown the same year, which also features some new wave sounds on his album. Choices features upbeat dance songs like "Hosanna Gloria" and "Get Right or Get Left" (which Bob Farrell co-wrote with DeGarmo and Key) and ballads like "Give Me the Words" and "The Greatest of These."

Their 1985 album Jump to Conclusions was a continuation of their new wave sound mixed with contemporary pop. Their first single "People In a Box" went Top 5 on the Christian CHR/Pop chart and the song is a humorous commentary on television culture. The song "The Meek and the Mighty" was a tribute to the struggling church in Eastern Europe (the duo had been allowed to tour Poland without their band in early 1984).

In 1986, Farrell and Farrell released their third and final album on Star Song called Manifesto, featuring techno-pop ("Launch Window"), rock ("Hidden Agenda") and ballads ("Fair Companion"). Their very first music video they made was for "People All Over the World" to promote the album. The song offers prayerful recognition of what had been a recent outpouring of compassion songs like USA for Africa's "We Are the World." After the release of Manifesto, their contract with Star Song expired and they would not release another album for two years.

=== Superpower, retirement and later years ===
Nearly three years after the release of Manifesto, Farrell and Farrell returned to the studio and signed on with Word Records for their next album Superpower. Their album is a straight-ahead pop album, leaving behind their new wave/techno-pop sound of their previous albums. A music video was made for the song "Heart of the Homeless". After the release of Superpower, the duo decided to retire from touring and recording, although wife Jayne does some occasional solo touring, husband Bob wanted to focus more on songwriting and producing. In 1993, Bob started collaborating with producer Greg Nelson, starting with Sandi Patty's concept album Le Voyage. They next collaborated in the musical Saviour in which they won a Dove Award for Musical of the Year. Farrell and Nelson won another Dove Award together for Choral Collection of the Year for Our Saviour... Emmanuel. In 2003, Farrell served as one of the assistant executive producers and was cast as Governor Pilate in the Christian rock opera !Hero and won a participation Dove Award for Special Event Album of the Year.

Bob Farrell died on July 11, 2026, at the age of 77.

== Discography ==
Group/solo projects

- Millennium (1973) with Millennium featuring Bob and Jayne (re-issued on CD in 2005 and sold only at their website)
- Jayne (1973) Jayne Farrell solo album
- Dove II (1974) with Dove featuring Bob Farrell

Farrell and Farrell

- Farrell & Farrell (1978) (NewPax)
- A Portrait of Us All (1979) (NewPax)
- Make Me Ready (1981) (NewPax)
- Let the Whole World Know – Live (1982) (NewPax)
- The Best of Farrell and Farrell (1984) (NewPax)
- Choices (1984) (Star Song)
- Jump to Conclusions (1985) (Star Song)
- Manifesto (1986) (Star Song)
- Superpower (1989) (DaySpring)
- The Meek and the Mighty (1989) (Star Song) (compilation of their Star Song years)
- The Early Works (1992) (Benson Records) (compilation of their NewPax/Benson years)
- Acoustic Christmas (2008) (available only on their website)
- Bob Farrell Collection (2009) (available only on their website)

Projects by Bob Farrell

- Le Voyage – Sandi Patty (1993) (all songs co-written with Greg Nelson)
- Saviour: The Story of God's Passion for His People (1995) – Various Artists (produced by Farrell and Nelson)
- Emmanuel: A Musical Celebration of the Life of Christ (1996) – Various Artists (produced by Farrell and Nelson)
- !Hero, the Rock Opera (2003) – cast as Governor Pilate, voice actor

== Accolades ==
GMA Dove Awards Bob Farrell has won 11 Dove Awards as a writer & creator/producer and one participating Dove Award.

Year	Winner	Category
1996	Saviour	Musical Album of the Year
1998	Our Saviour...Emmanuel	Choral Collection of the Year
2004	!Hero, the Rock Opera	Special Event Album of the Year
