= Coal Black Rose =

Folk song

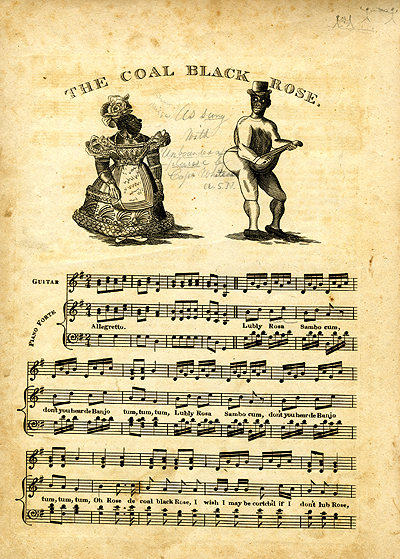
Sheet music to "Coal Black Rose", c. 1830

"Coal Black Rose" is a folk song, one of the earliest songs to be sung by a man in blackface. The man dressed as an overweight and overdressed black woman, who was found unattractive and masculine-looking. The song was first performed in the United States in the late 1820s, possibly by George Washington Dixon. It was certainly Dixon who popularized the song when he put on three blackface performances at the Bowery Theatre, the Chatham Garden Theatre, and the Park Theatre in late July 1829. These shows also propelled Dixon to stardom.

During the height of its popularity, the general assumption was that Dixon's performances of "Coal Black Rose" in 1829 were the birth of blackface minstrelsy. However, Thomas Blakeley had also performed the song in 1829 at the Park Theatre. "Coal Black Rose" entered the repertoires of other performers, who sung it both in and out of blackface.

The lyrics of "Coal Black Rose" tell of a fight between two black men, Sambo and Cuffee, rivals for the same woman. This was a common trope in early minstrel music, and it proved a good source for dramatic farce. Dixon performed one on 24 September 1829 under the title Love in a Cloud at the Bowery Theatre. Thomas D. Rice did other dramatitizations under the titles Long-Island Juba; or, Love in a Bushel and Oh Hush!; or The Virginny Cupids. The latter version became one of the most popular farces of antebellum minstrelsy.
