= !Hero (album) =

2003 studio album by various artists

Studio album by Various artists
- Released: September 2, 2003
- Genre: Christian rock
- Length: 1 hour, 47 minutes
- Label: ForeFront / Emd
- Producer: Pete Stewart

Professional ratings
Review scores
Source	Rating
CCM Magazine	B
Christianity Today	2/5 stars
Jesus Freak Hideout	4/5 stars

!Hero is an album featuring the songs from the rock opera, !Hero. It is based on the question, "What if Jesus was born in Bethlehem, Pennsylvania?" The rock opera modernizes Jesus' last two years on earth and features a cast of many well-known Christian rock artists with Michael Tait, Rebecca St. James, and Mark Stuart as the three main characters: Hero (Jesus), Maggie (Mary Magdalene), and Petrov (Peter).

== Track listing and performers ==
Disc 1
No.	Title	Writer(s)	Artist	Length
1.	"This is How it Happened"	Mat Kearney and Pete Stewart	Paul Wright	2:08
2.	"A Few Good Men"	Eddie DeGarmo	Michael Quinlan, Mark Stuart, Michael Tait	5:09
3.	"Wedding Celebration"	Eddie DeGarmo	John Cooper, John Grey, Michael Tait, Nirva Dorsaint, and GRITS	4:32
4.	"Fire of Love"	Eddie DeGarmo	John Cooper and Michael Tait	4:38
5.	"Lose My Life with You"	Eddie DeGarmo	Michael Tait and Nirva Dorsaint	3:14
6.	"Man on a Mission"	Matt Kearney and Pete Stewart	Paul Wright	1:14
7.	"Secrets of the Heart"	Eddie DeGarmo	Rebecca St. James and Michael Tait	3:52
8.	"Stand Up and Walk"	Eddie DeGarmo	John Cooper, Matt Hammitt, and Michael Tait	4:24
9.	"Do What You Gotta Do"	Eddie DeGarmo	John Cooper and Pete Stewart	3:05
10.	"Take My Hand"	Eddie DeGarmo	Michael Tait	1:48
11.	"Love's Declaration"	Eddie DeGarmo	Rebecca St. James, Mark Stuart, and Michael Tait	3:17
12.	"Raised in Harlem (Note: Raised in Harlem was featured on Hip Hope Hits 2005, a compilation album on Gotee Records.)"	Eddie DeGarmo and Pete Stewart	T-Bone, Michael Tait and Donnie	4:21
13.	"They're Callin' Him Hero"	Mat Kearney and Pete Stewart	Paul Wright	2:42
14.	"Manna From Heaven"	Eddie DeGarmo	Rebecca St. James, Michael Quinlan, Mark Stuart, and Michael Tait	4:20
15.	"Hero"	Eddie DeGarmo	Rebecca St. James, Michael Quinlan, and Mark Stuart	4:41

Disc 2
No.	Title	Writer(s)	Artist	Length
1.	"He Just Had to Stir Things Up/Leave Here"	Eddie DeGarmo	Rebecca St. James, Michael Tait, and Paul Wright	5:19
2.	"Stand by You"	Eddie DeGarmo	Rebecca St. James and Paul Wright	2:47
3.	"Say the Word"	Eddie DeGarmo	Paul Wright	1:36
4.	"Intentions"	Eddie DeGarmo	Michael Quinlan	3:20
5.	"Finally Home"	Eddie DeGarmo	Rebecca St. James, Michael Quinlan, and Mark Stuart	3:37
6.	"Not in Our House"	Eddie DeGarmo and Pete Stewart	John Cooper and Michael Tait	2:09
7.	"Murder on Their Minds"	Mat Kearney and Pete Stewart	Paul Wright	2:59
8.	"Party in the House Today"	Eddie DeGarmo	Mark Stuart	3:49
9.	"In Remembrance of Me"	Eddie DeGarmo	Michael Tait	1:53
10.	"Shadowman"	Eddie DeGarmo	Michael Quinlan and Pete Stewart	5:00
11.	"Hero's Agony"	Eddie DeGarmo	Michael Tait	2:37
12.	"I Am"	Eddie DeGarmo	Michael Tait	4:17
13.	"Kill the Hero"	Eddie DeGarmo	John Cooper, Paul Wright, and Bob Farrell	6:00
14.	"Execute/Intentions (Reprise)/Hero (Reprise)/Lose My Life With You"	Eddie DeGarmo	Rebecca St. James, Nirva Dorsaint and Michael Quinlan	3:58
15.	"He's Not Here"	Eddie DeGarmo	Rebecca St. James and Nathaniel Lee	3:41
16.	"The Truth Comes Out"	Eddie DeGarmo and Mat Kearney	Paul Wright	1:47

== Reviews ==
Chris Well, writing for CCM Magazine, reviewed it favorably and stated, "!Hero is inventive, rhythmic and should, no doubt, spark debate everywhere about the real Jesus." On the other hand, Andree Farias of Christian Music Today, wrote, "!Hero's attempt to be all things to all people is well-intentioned, its 'replayability' value is minimal, deeming it no more than a glorified post-concert souvenir for the live stage show."

== Primary cast ==
- Michael Tait as Hero
- Mark Stuart of Audio Adrenaline as Petrov
- Rebecca St. James as Maggie
- Paul Wright as Special Agent Hunter
- Nirva Dorsaint as Mama Mary
- John Cooper of Skillet as Chief Rabbi Kai
- Michael Quinlan as Jude
- Matt Hammitt of Sanctus Real as blind cripple
- T-Bone as Jairus
- Donnie Lewis as Jairus' wife
- Pete Stewart as Chief of police Devlin
- Bob Farrell as Governor Pilate
- John Grey as Preacher Rabbi at the wedding
- Nathaniel Lee as Janitor Angel
- GRITS as the Wedding Party
- Pete and Donna Stewart as the bride and groom at the wedding

=== Secondary cast and musicians ===
- Todd Collins – percussion
- Eddie DeGarmo – piano, background vocals, executive producer
- DJ Maj – scratching
- Jason Eskridge – background vocals
- Kim Fleming – choir
- Brad Ford – vocals, assistant executive producer
- Robert Gay – children's chorus
- Rachel Goldstein – choir
- Kirk "Jelly Roll" Johnson – harmonica
- Tony Lucido – bass guitar
- Rick May – drums
- Ann McCrary – choir
- Antonio Phelon – choir, background vocals
- John Ray – choir
- Becky Robertson – children's chorus
- Joanna Robertson – children's chorus
- Thomas Romines – choir
- Pete Stewart – acoustic guitar, electric guitar, bass, piano, electric piano
- Greg Thomas – choir
- Patti Thomas – choir
- Michelle Valentine – choir
- Paul Wright III

=== Support staff ===
- Eddie DeGarmo – executive producer
- Brad Ford – assistant executive producer
- Carl Marsh – Fairlight, string arrangement
- Bethany Newman – art director, design
- Marcelo Pennell – audio engineer
- Carter Robertson – choir director
- Dan Shike – mastering
- Pete Stewart – audio engineer, producer, programming
- Greg Thomas – choir director
