= Robert Farrell (priest) =

Robert Thompson Farrell was an Irish Anglican priest: he was Archdeacon of Clogher from 1957 until 1968.

Farrell was educated at Trinity College, Dublin and ordained deacon in 1921 and priest in 1922. After a curacy in Enniskillen he was Curate in charge of Augher from 1926 to 1930. Farrell held incumbencies at Aghavea (1930 to 1944) and Lisnaskea (1944–1968). He was Rural Dean of Clogher from 1945 to 1957.
