= Lonely House =

Studio album by Grammatrain
- Released: September 19, 1995
- Recorded: 1995
- Studio: Audio Genesis, Seattle, Washington; Avast!, Seattle, Washington; Bad Animals, Seattle, Washington
- Genre: Christian rock; grunge; alternative rock; post-grunge
- Length: 53:05
- Label: ForeFront
- Producer: Aaron Sprinkle; Grammatrain

Grammatrain chronology
Lonely House (1995)	Flying (1997)

Singles from Lonely House
- 1. "Believe" Released: 1995; 2. "She Don't Know" Released: 1995

Professional ratings
Review scores
Source	Rating
AllMusic	4/5 stars
Cross Rhythms	9/10 squares
Jesus Freak Hideout	4.5/5 stars

Lonely House is the debut studio album by American rock band Grammatrain, released on September 19, 1995 on ForeFront Records. The album's sound is a combination of grunge, alternative rock, and post-grunge with Christian lyrics. Two songs from the album, "Believe" and "She Don't Know", were released as singles.

== Recording history ==
Before the release of Lonely House, Grammatrain released both a self-titled three-track demo cassette tape independently and a self-titled demo CD on Zoe Worldwide Records in 1994. The demo tape's songs included "Drown", "Mindform" and "Need", the second of which was exclusive to the tape. The demo tape was recorded and mixed on March 19 and 20, 1994 at Cascade Recording in Cle Elum, Washington. Seven songs from the self-titled demo CD, with the exception of "For Me", appear in a re-recorded form on Lonely House. "For Me" would later be re-recorded for Grammatrain's second studio album, Flying, in 1997.

Lonely House was recorded in 1995 in Seattle, Washington. A music video, directed by Henry Shepherd, was made for the song "Believe". In a Cross Rhythms article, the band stated "Sick of Will" as being their favorite track on the album.

During an interview on Jesus Freaks: Vinyl to Digital in 2021, drummer Paul Joseph Roraback said his daughter was the person on the front cover of Lonely House and that the album was recorded in a few weeks.

== Track listing ==
All lyrics are written by Grammatrain; all music is composed by Grammatrain.

No.	Title	Length
1.	"She Don't Know"	2:32
2.	"Believe^{[a]}^{[b]}^{[d]}"	3:36
3.	"Execution^{[a]}^{[b]}^{[d]}"	3:55
4.	"Lonely House^{[a]}^{[b]}^{[d]}"	5:43
5.	"Psycho"	5:41
6.	"Sick of Will"	3:01
7.	"Need^{[c]}^{[d]}"	6:28
8.	"Drown^{[b]}^{[c]}"	3:55
9.	"Undivine Election^{[b]}"	3:34
10.	"Jerky Love Song^{[a]}^{[b]}^{[d]}"	0:40
11.	"Humanity^{[b]}"	4:24
12.	"Picture Pains"	6:32
13.	"Apathy"	2:58
Total length:		53:05

^{a} song re-recorded from Grammatrain demo CD (1994)
^{b} live acoustic recording appears on Grammatrain demo CD (1994)
^{c} song re-recorded from Grammatrain demo cassette (1994)
^{d} live recording appears on Live 120798 (1999)

== Reception ==
Lonely House received positive reviews from critics. Mike Rimmer of Cross Rhythms described the album as "a powerful rock performance that deserves to place Grammatrain at the front of the queue for Christian rock" and said about Grammatrain in his review "If you were looking for a Christian band with the power of Nirvana without the paranoia, you've found them!" In 1996, Lonely House was nominated for best "Modern Rock/Alternative Album" at the 27th Annual GMA Dove Awards and the "Believe" music video was nominated for "Best New Artist Clip, Contemporary Christian" at the Billboard Music Video Awards.

== Personnel ==
Grammatrain

- Pete Stewart – vocals, guitar
- Dalton Roraback – bass guitar
- Paul Joseph Roraback – drums, percussion

Additional musician

- Hans Fredrickson – cello ("Need")

Production

- Aaron Sprinkle, Grammatrain – producers, engineers
- Dan R. Brock, Eddie DeGarmo – executive producers
- Aaron Sprinkle – mixer
- Kip Beelman, John Burton, Charles Meserole, Kevin Suggs – assistant mixers
- Mixed at Bad Animals (Seattle)
- Aaron Mlasko – drum technical director
- Jim Dantzler – art direction
- Flywheel Design (Seattle) – design, layout
- Karen Mason – photography
- Sheri Jongeward, Aaron McRae – additional live photos
- Doug Mann – A&R
- Ken Love – mastering at MasterMix (Nashville, Tennessee)
