= Adeline Miller =

American madam

- Born: c. 1777
- Died: August 24, 1859 (aged 81–82)
- Occupations: Prostitute; Brothel madam

Adeline Miller, alias Adeline Furman (c. 1777 – August 24, 1859), was an American madam and prostitute. According to her contemporary George Templeton Strong, Miller was active in New York City prostitution from the late 1810s. By 1821, she was running a brothel on Church Street, where she had accumulated personal effects worth at least $500.

Over Miller's 30-year career, she became quite wealthy. At one point or another, Miller ran houses on Duane, Elm, Orange and Reade streets. She owned, but did not manage, another brothel on Cross Street. Rumors suggested that, in the 1840s, she charged her girls $14 a week to stay in her brothels. By 1855, she had many personal residences; the one on Church Street alone contained effects valued at $5,000.

Miller was a celebrity as well. Her name appeared in tourist guidebooks and in the diaries of rich New Yorkers. The Libertine opined that she and Phoebe Doty, another madam, should rent New York's Park Theatre and talk about their exploits. The paper predicted that "the house would be crammed if the entrance was five dollars a head. The bigger the harlot now-a-days the more money is made." By the 1840s, the aging Miller had become the subject of negative press, particularly from The Whip. The paper called her a "grey-haired hag" and "the most wicked procuress in the city".

Miller had children, though all entered more mainstream professions. Her daughter, Louisa Missouri Miller, was an actress and mistress of English actor and theatre manager Thomas S. Hamblin.
