= List of Kansas band members =

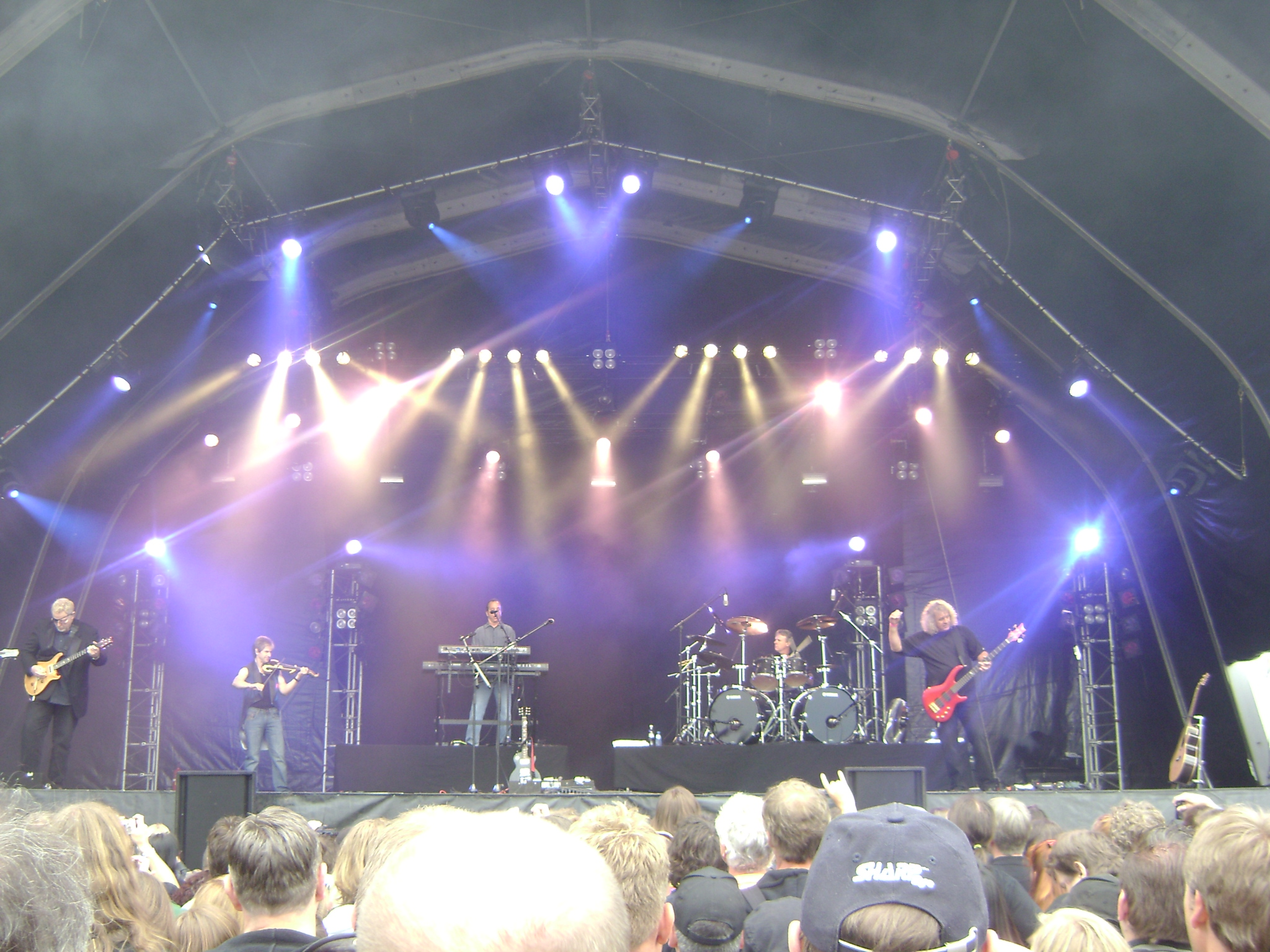
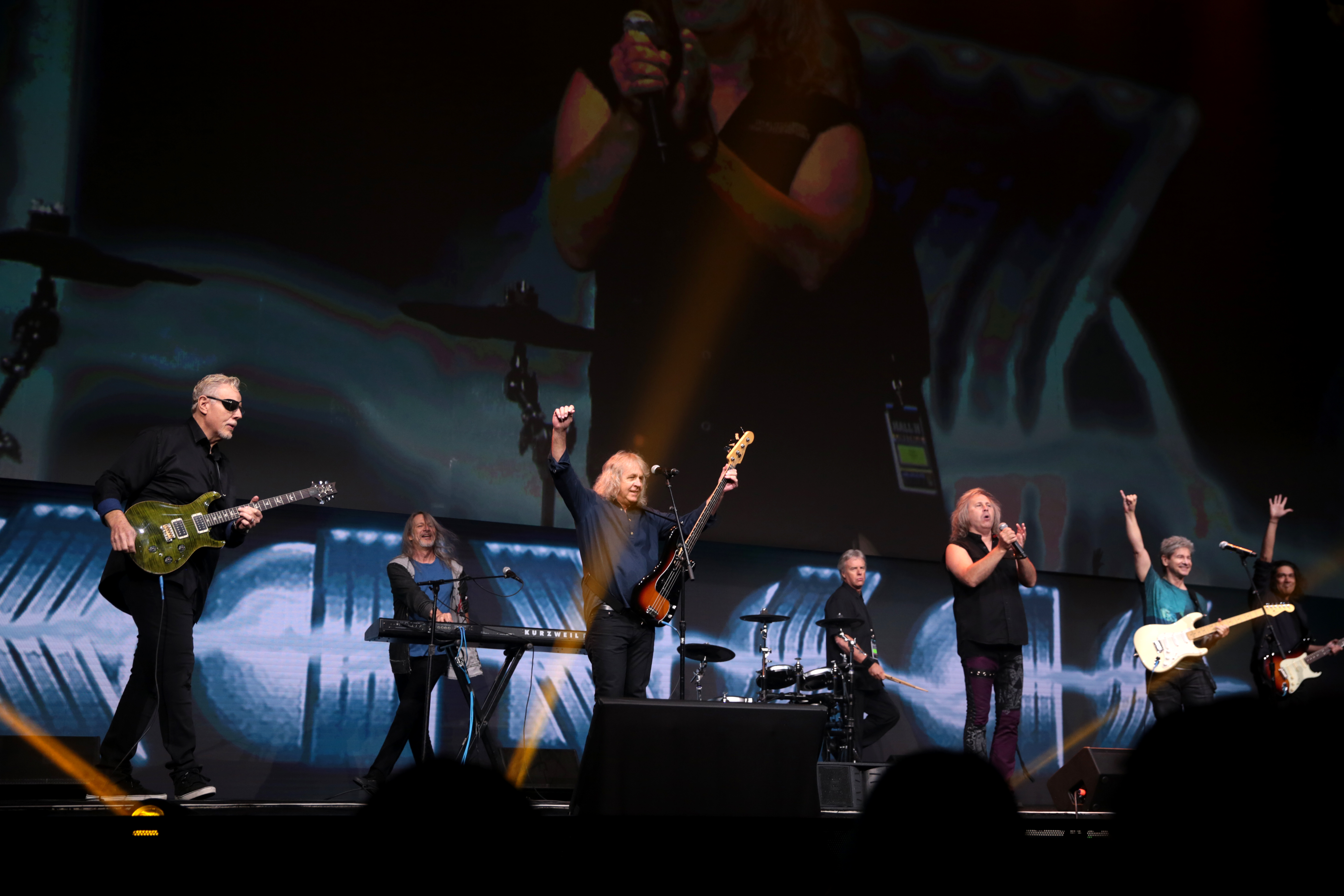
Two lineups of Kansas performing live in 2008 (top) and 2017 (bottom).

Kansas is an American progressive rock band from Topeka, Kansas. The band's current lineup features constant members guitarist Rich Williams and drummer Phil Ehart, alongside lead guitarist Zak Rizvi (who first joined in 2016), vocalist and keyboardist Ronnie Platt (since 2014), keyboardist and vocalist Tom Brislin (since 2018), violinist and rhythm guitarist Joe Deninzon (since 2023), bassist and vocalist Dan McGowan (since 2024) and guitarist Scott Bernard (since 2025).

== History ==
=== 1970–1984 ===
In 1969, Don Montre and Kerry Livgren (guitars, keyboards, synthesizers) were performing in a band called the Reasons Why in their hometown of Topeka, Kansas. After leaving to form the band Saratoga with Lynn Meredith and Dan Wright, they started playing Livgren's original material, with Scott Kessler playing bass and Zeke Lowe coming in on drums.

In 1970, they changed the band's name to Kansas and merged with members of rival Topeka progressive rock group White Clover. White Clover members Dave Hope (bass) and Phil Ehart (drums, percussion) joined with Livgren, vocalists Meredith and Greg Allen, keyboardists Montre and Wright and saxophonist Larry Baker. This early Kansas group, sometimes called Kansas I, lasted until early 1971 when Ehart, Hope and some of the others left to re-form White Clover.

Ehart was replaced by Zeke Lowe and later Brad Schulz, Hope was replaced by Rod Mikinski on bass and Baker was replaced by John Bolton on saxophone and flute. This line-up is sometimes referred to as Kansas II, and 30 years later would re-form under the name Proto-Kaw.

In 1972, after Ehart returned from England (where he had gone to look for other musicians), he and Hope once again re-formed White Clover with Robby Steinhardt (vocals, violin, viola, cello), Steve Walsh (vocals, keyboards, synthesizers, percussion) and Rich Williams (guitars). In early 1973, they recruited Livgren from the second Kansas group, which then folded. Eventually they received a recording contract with Don Kirshner's eponymous label, after Kirshner's assistant, Wally Gold, heard one of their demo tapes and came out to check out the band at one of their local gigs in March 1973 in Ellinwood, Kansas. After signing with Kirshner, the group decided to return to using the name "Kansas".

The group's next lineup change came in October 1981, when frontman Walsh left the band during the early stages of writing for their eighth studio album Vinyl Confessions. Speaking in a 2015 interview, Ehart recalled that "Things were hurtling so fast that there was no way to avoid hitting a breaking point," agreeing that Livgren's lyrical content influenced Walsh's departure, but adding that "that was one of many things going on that was making it difficult to be a band."

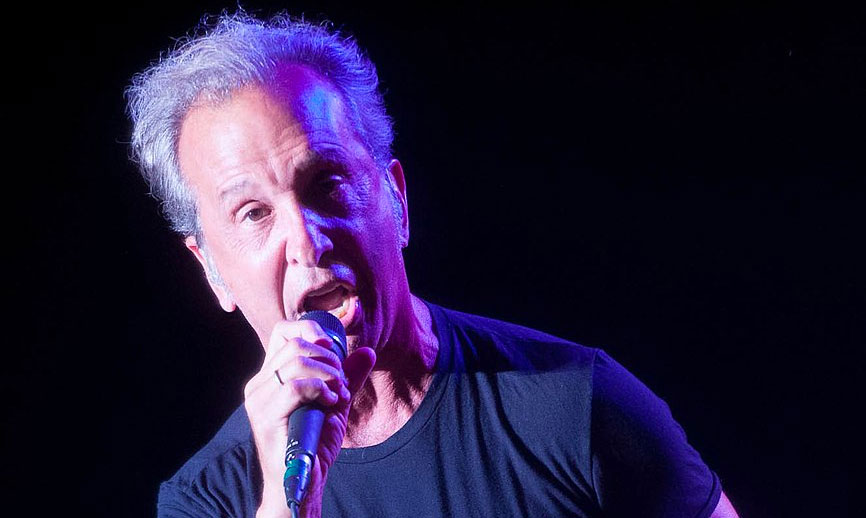
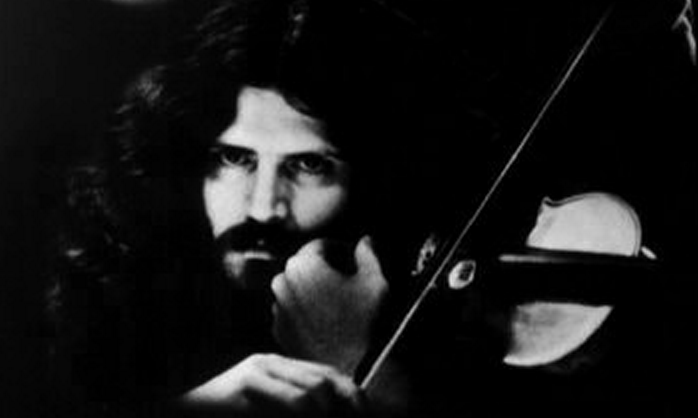
Both lead vocalists, Steve Walsh (top) and Robby Steinhardt (bottom), left Kansas within a year of one another in the early 1980s.

Before the end of the year, Walsh was replaced by John Elefante, who performed on Vinyl Confessions and wrote several songs for the album. After the subsequent concert tour later in 1982, however, Steinhardt followed Walsh in leaving Kansas. Citing Steinhardt's ongoing problems with substance abuse, Ehart has since recalled that "We'd been trying for ages to persuade Robby to clean up. In the end, we told him that he needed to go away for a while." His role was not replaced – the band was reduced to a five-piece for Drastic Measures. Livgren, the band's main songwriter to that point, contributed only three compositions to the 1983 release.

Six months after the release of Drastic Measures, both Livgren and Hope left Kansas to form AD, a Christian rock outfit. In 1984, the remaining trio of Elefante, Williams and Ehart recorded one song, "Perfect Lover", for the compilation album The Best of Kansas issued that year. During a tour of military bases organized by the United Service Organizations (USO) in March 1984, Elefante decided that he would leave Kansas to focus on his own Christian music. The singer claimed that the band's management threatened to take legal action against him if he left, recalling that "I remember having lunch ... with Kansas' management and attorney. They were working me over, giving me a real brow beating, and threatening to sue if I left the band. I finally said, 'Guys, I'm gone. This isn't the place for me anymore.' And that was it."

=== 1985–1999 ===
After around a year later, it was announced in July 1985 that Kansas had reformed with original vocalist Steve Walsh, who was then touring with Cheap Trick as their live keyboardist. Alongside returning members Rich Williams and Phil Ehart, the group replaced lead guitarist Kerry Livgren with Steve Morse of Dixie Dregs and his own eponymous band, and bassist Dave Hope with Billy Greer, a former bandmate of Walsh's from his post-Kansas group Streets. Morse recorded two albums with the group – Power and In the Spirit of Things – before leaving in 1989 to promote his third solo effort (the first under just his name) High Tension Wires.

Following Morse's departure, Kansas parted ways with MCA Records and went on a temporary hiatus, as the remaining members focused on other projects. The following fall, the group embarked on a European tour which featured the return of Livgren and Hope to the lineup. The tour also featured keyboardist Greg Robert, who had joined three years earlier and performed on In the Spirit of Things. A second leg in North America was scheduled for the following year, with Hope bowing out after the first, before Livgren left again and Morse returned to complete the dates. The 1991 touring cycle also saw the Kansas debut of David Ragsdale, the band's first violinist since Robby Steinhardt left in 1982, who joined in April.

Kansas settled in the early 1990s with the lineup of Walsh, Williams, Greer, Ehart, Robert and Ragsdale, releasing Live at the Whisky in 1992 and Freaks of Nature, their first studio album in seven years, in 1995. In 1997, Steinhardt returned as both Ragsdale and Robert departed. Walsh returned later in the year for an orchestral tour, which led to the recording and release of Always Never the Same with the London Symphony Orchestra.

=== From 1999 ===
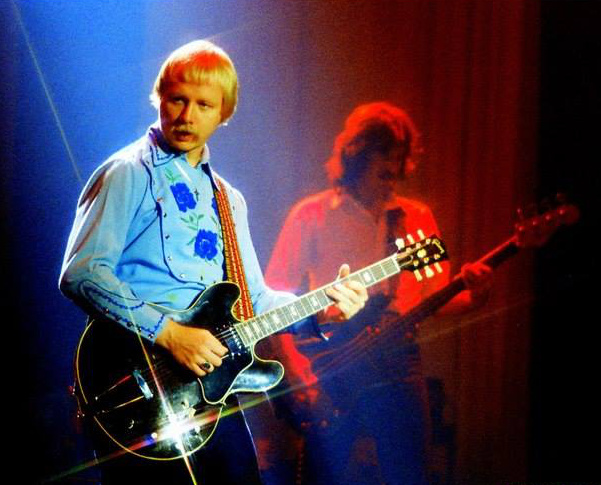
Kansas briefly reunited with original lead guitarist and songwriter Kerry Livgren in 1999 to record the album Somewhere to Elsewhere.

In 1999, Kansas reunited with original lead guitarist Kerry Livgren, who had written and produced demos for several new songs described by drummer Phil Ehart as sounding "like classic Kansas". Recording started in early 2000 for a new album, Somewhere to Elsewhere, at the guitarist's own Grandyzine Studios in Topeka, where the group had originally formed. The album was released in July and also featured original bassist Dave Hope on two tracks, marking the first time the band's original lineup had featured together on a recording since 1980. Livgren remained only for the recording, with the previous lineup of the group returning to tour later in the year.

After several more years touring, Kansas parted ways with violinist and vocalist Robby Steinhardt for a second time in March 2006, which Steve Walsh described as "one of the most difficult things we've ever had to do". He was replaced the following month by his previous replacement David Ragsdale. Speaking about the lineup change, Ehart explained that "Robby just got to the end of the road. He was very honest when he talked to me. He said that he had just lost the desire to do this anymore."

On June 30, 2014, it was announced that Walsh would be leaving Kansas, with his final performance scheduled for August 16. After Walsh initially only stated that "it's time for me to go", it was later revealed that the singer was experiencing vocal problems and had lost interest in the band, with guitarist Rich Williams explaining later that "Steve was really struggling ... [he] had been struggling for years with his voice, but besides that, he just wasn't enjoying it any more." In July, Walsh's impending replacement on lead vocals was announced to be Ronnie Platt, while David Manion – a bandmate of Billy Greer's in Seventh Key – was added as the group's new main keyboardist.

Kansas released The Prelude Implicit, its first studio album in 16 years, in September 2016. The album marked the debut of new guitarist Zak Rizvi, who had originally been brought in as a co-producer but was later made a full member of the group. After another live album recorded on a tour to mark the 40th anniversary of Leftoverture, Manion left Kansas "to pursue other musical endeavors" in December 2018, with Tom Brislin taking his place. The band released their sixteenth album, The Absence of Presence, in July 2020.

In April 2021, Kansas announced Zak Rizvi has resigned from the band and that he "looks forward to pursuing new projects". In May 2023, Dave Ragsdale was replaced by Stratospheerius frontman Joe Deninzon. Rizvi rejoined in April 2024. In September 2024, Dan McGowan replaced Billy Greer. In August 2025, the band announced Scott Bernard as new guitarist while Williams scales back touring, Bernard had previously been a touring substitute.

== Members ==
=== Current ===
Image	Name	Years active	Instruments	Release contributions
	Phil Ehart	1973–1984; 1985–present	drums; percussion; manager (not currently touring)	all Kansas releases except for Early Recordings from Kansas 1971–1973 (2002)
	Rich Williams	1973–1984; 1985–present	lead and rhythm guitars; occasional backing vocals	all Kansas releases except for Early Recordings from Kansas 1971–1973 (2002)
	Ronnie Platt	2014–present	lead and backing vocals; keyboards	The Prelude Implicit (2016); Leftoverture: Live and Beyond (2017); The Absence of Presence (2020); Point of Know Return: Live and Beyond (2021)
	Zak Rizvi	2016–2021; 2024–present	lead and rhythm guitars; backing vocals	The Prelude Implicit (2016); Leftoverture: Live and Beyond (2017); The Absence of Presence (2020); Point of Know Return: Live and Beyond (2021)
	Tom Brislin	2018–present	keyboards; backing and lead vocals	The Absence of Presence (2020); Point of Know Return: Live and Beyond (2021)
	Joe Deninzon	2023–present	violin; rhythm guitar; vocals	none to date
	Dan McGowan	2024–present (touring substitute early 2024)	bass; backing and lead vocals	none to date
	Scott Bernard	2025–present (touring substitute 2024–2025)	guitar; backing vocals	none to date

=== Former ===
Image	Name	Years active	Instruments	Release contributions
	Kerry Livgren	1973–1983; 1990–1991; 1999–2000; 2002 (touring substitute) (guest 1992, late 1990s, early 2000s, 2001, 2009, 2013, 2023, 2024)	lead and rhythm guitars; keyboards; synthesizers; backing vocals	all Kansas releases from Kansas (1974) to Drastic Measures (1983); Live at the Whisky (1992) – guest appearance on three tracks only; Somewhere to Elsewhere (2000); There's Know Place Like Home (2009) – guest appearance on four tracks only
	Dave Hope	1973–1983; 1990; 1999–2000 (guest 2013, 2023, 2024, 2025)	bass; backing vocals	all Kansas releases from Kansas (1974) to Drastic Measures (1983); Live at the Whisky (1992) – guest appearance on one bonus track only; Somewhere to Elsewhere (2000) – two tracks only
	Robby Steinhardt	1973–1983; 1997–2006 (died 2021)	violin; viola; cello; lead and backing vocals	all Kansas releases from Kansas (1974) to Vinyl Confessions (1982); Always Never the Same (1998); Somewhere to Elsewhere (2000); Device – Voice – Drum (2002)
	Steve Walsh	1973–1981; 1985–2014	lead and backing vocals; keyboards; synthesizers; vibraphone; percussion	all Kansas releases from Kansas (1974) to Audio-Visions (1980), and from Power (1986) to There's Know Place Like Home (2009)
	John Elefante	1981–1984	lead and backing vocals; keyboards; guitar	Vinyl Confessions (1982); Drastic Measures (1983); The Best of Kansas (1984) – new song "Perfect Lover"
	Billy Greer	1985–2024	bass; acoustic guitar; lead and backing vocals (backing until 2006, co-lead since)	all Kansas releases from Power (1986) to Point of Know Return: Live and Beyond (2021)
	Steve Morse	1986–1989; 1991; (guest 2009, 2024)	lead and rhythm guitars; backing vocals	Power (1986); In the Spirit of Things (1988); King Biscuit Flower Hour (1998); There's Know Place Like Home (2009) – guest appearance on three tracks only
	Greg Robert	1987–1997	keyboards; backing vocals	all Kansas releases from In the Spirit of Things (1988) to Freaks of Nature (1995)
	David Ragsdale	1991–1997; 2006–2023	violin; backing vocals; rhythm guitar	Live at the Whisky (1992); The Kansas Boxed Set (1994) – new song "Wheels"; Freaks of Nature (1995); all Kansas releases from There's Know Place Like Home (2009) to Point of Know Return: Live and Beyond (2021)
	David Manion	2014–2018	keyboards; backing vocals	The Prelude Implicit (2016); Leftoverture: Live and Beyond (2017)

=== Touring ===
Image	Name	Years active	Instruments	Release contributions and notes
	Warren Ham	1982	saxophone; flute; harmonica; backing vocals; keyboards	Vinyl Confessions (1982) - Ham was a candidate to replace Walsh before Elefante was hired, he stayed with the band as session woodwind player.
	Michael Gleason	1983	keyboards; backing vocals; guitar	Gleason replaced Ham on keyboards and guitars.
	Eric Holmquist	2016; 2018; 2022–present	drums; percussion	Phil Ehart's drum tech has filled in for him various times since 2016.
	Kyle Henderson	2023–2024	bass; vocals	Filled-in for Greer.
	Jason Gianni	2025	drums	Filled-in for Holmquist.

== Lineups ==
Period	Members	Releases
Early 1970 – Mid 1971	Lynn Meredith – vocals; Greg Allen – vocals; Kerry Livgren – guitar, backing vocals; Dave Hope – bass, backing vocals; Phil Ehart – drums, percussion; Don Montre – keyboards, backing vocals; Dan Wright – keyboards; Larry Baker – saxophone	None
Late 1971 – Early 1972	Lynn Meredith – lead vocals; Kerry Livgren – guitar, backing vocals; Don Montre – keyboards, backing vocals; Dan Wright – keyboards; Rod Mikinski – bass, backing vocals; Zeke Lowe − drums, percussion; John Bolton − saxophone	Early Recordings from Kansas 1971–1973 (2002) (select tracks)
Early 1972 – Late 1972	Lynn Meredith – lead vocals; Kerry Livgren – guitar, backing vocals; Don Montre – keyboards, backing vocals; Dan Wright – keyboards; Rod Mikinski – bass, backing vocals; John Bolton − saxophone; Brad Schulz − drums, percussion	Early Recordings from Kansas 1971–1973 (2002)
Early 1973 − Mid 1973	Dave Hope – bass, backing vocals; Phil Ehart – drums, percussion; Rich Williams – guitar, backing vocals; Steve Walsh – vocals, keyboards, percussion; Robby Steinhardt – vocals, violin, viola, cello	None
Mid 1973 – October 1981	Kerry Livgren – lead guitar, keyboards, backing vocals; Dave Hope – bass, backing vocals; Phil Ehart – drums, percussion; Steve Walsh – vocals, keyboards, percussion; Robby Steinhardt – vocals, violin, viola, cello; Rich Williams – rhythm guitar, backing vocals	Kansas (1974); Song for America (1975); Masque (1975); Leftoverture (1976); Point of Know Return (1977); Two for the Show (1978); Monolith (1979); Audio-Visions (1980)
December 1981 – November 1982	Kerry Livgren – lead guitar, keyboards, backing vocals; Dave Hope – bass, backing vocals; Phil Ehart – drums, percussion; Rich Williams – rhythm guitar, backing vocals; Robby Steinhardt – vocals, violin, viola, cello; John Elefante – vocals, keyboards	Vinyl Confessions (1982)
November 1982 – December 1983	Kerry Livgren – lead guitar, keyboards, backing vocals; Dave Hope – bass, backing vocals; Phil Ehart – drums, percussion; Rich Williams – rhythm guitar, backing vocals; John Elefante – lead vocals, keyboards	Drastic Measures (1983)
December 1983 – summer 1984	Phil Ehart – drums, percussion; Rich Williams – guitar, backing vocals; John Elefante – lead vocals, keyboards; Dino Elefante – bass (session only)	The Best of Kansas (1984) – one new song, "Perfect Lover"
Band inactive summer 1984 – March 1985
March 1985 – early 1987	Phil Ehart – drums, percussion; Rich Williams – rhythm guitar, backing vocals; Steve Walsh – lead vocals, keyboards; Steve Morse – lead guitar, backing vocals; Billy Greer – bass, acoustic guitar, backing vocals	Power (1986)
Early 1987 – April 1989	Phil Ehart – drums, percussion; Rich Williams – rhythm guitar, backing vocals; Steve Walsh – lead vocals, keyboards; Steve Morse – lead guitar, backing vocals; Billy Greer – bass, acoustic guitar, backing vocals; Greg Robert – keyboards, backing vocals	In the Spirit of Things (1988); King Biscuit Flower Hour (1989)
April 1989 – fall 1990	Phil Ehart – drums, percussion; Rich Williams – electric guitar, backing vocals; Steve Walsh – lead vocals, keyboards; Billy Greer – bass, acoustic guitar, backing vocals; Greg Robert – keyboards, backing vocals	none
Fall 1990 (temporary touring lineup)	Phil Ehart – drums, percussion; Kerry Livgren – electric guitar (select shows only); Dave Hope – bass (select shows only); Rich Williams – electric guitar, backing vocals; Steve Walsh – lead vocals, keyboards; Billy Greer – bass, acoustic guitar, backing vocals; Greg Robert – keyboards, backing vocals	none
Late 1990 – April 1991	Kerry Livgren – lead guitar, keyboards, backing vocals; Phil Ehart – drums, percussion; Rich Williams – rhythm guitar, backing vocals; Steve Walsh – lead vocals, keyboards; Billy Greer – bass, acoustic guitar, backing vocals; Greg Robert – keyboards, backing vocals	none
April – summer 1991	Kerry Livgren – lead guitar, keyboards, backing vocals; Phil Ehart – drums, percussion; Rich Williams – rhythm guitar, backing vocals; Steve Walsh – lead vocals, keyboards; Billy Greer – bass, acoustic guitar, backing vocals; Greg Robert – keyboards, backing vocals; David Ragsdale – violin, backing vocals	none
Summer – fall 1991	Phil Ehart – drums, percussion; Rich Williams – rhythm guitar, backing vocals; Steve Walsh – lead vocals, keyboards; Billy Greer – bass, acoustic guitar, backing vocals; Steve Morse – lead guitar, backing vocals; Greg Robert – keyboards, backing vocals; David Ragsdale – violin, backing vocals	none
Fall 1991 – early 1997	Phil Ehart – drums, percussion; Rich Williams – lead guitar, backing vocals; Steve Walsh – lead vocals, keyboards; Billy Greer – bass, acoustic guitar, backing vocals; Greg Robert – keyboards, backing vocals; David Ragsdale – violin, rhythm guitar, backing vocals	Freaks of Nature (1995)
Early 1997 – late 1999	Phil Ehart – drums, percussion; Rich Williams – electric guitar, backing vocals; Steve Walsh – vocals, keyboards; Robby Steinhardt – vocals, violin, viola; Billy Greer – bass, acoustic guitar, backing vocals	Always Never the Same (1998)
Late 1999 – summer 2000	Kerry Livgren – lead guitar, keyboards, backing vocals; Phil Ehart – drums, percussion; Rich Williams – rhythm guitar, backing vocals; Steve Walsh – vocals, keyboards; Robby Steinhardt – vocals, violin, viola; Billy Greer – bass, acoustic guitar, backing vocals	Somewhere to Elsewhere (2000)
Summer 2000 – March 2006	Phil Ehart – drums, percussion; Rich Williams – electric guitar, backing vocals; Steve Walsh – vocals, keyboards; Robby Steinhardt – vocals, violin, viola; Billy Greer – bass, acoustic guitar, backing vocals	Device – Voice – Drum (2002)
April 2006 – August 2014	Phil Ehart – drums, percussion; Rich Williams – lead guitar, backing vocals; Steve Walsh – vocals, keyboards; Billy Greer – bass, acoustic guitar, vocals; David Ragsdale – violin, rhythm guitar, backing vocals	There's Know Place Like Home (2009)
August 2014 – May 2016	Phil Ehart – drums, percussion; Rich Williams – lead guitar, backing vocals; Billy Greer – bass, acoustic guitar, vocals; David Ragsdale – violin, rhythm guitar, backing vocals; Ronnie Platt – vocals, keyboards; David Manion – keyboards, backing vocals	none
May 2016 – December 2018	Phil Ehart – drums, percussion; Rich Williams – rhythm and lead guitar, backing vocals; Billy Greer – bass, acoustic guitar, vocals; David Ragsdale – violin, rhythm guitar, backing vocals; Ronnie Platt – vocals, keyboards; David Manion – keyboards, backing vocals; Zak Rizvi – lead guitar, backing vocals	The Prelude Implicit (2016); Leftoverture Live & Beyond (2017)
December 2018 – April 2021	Phil Ehart – drums, percussion; Rich Williams – rhythm and lead guitar, backing vocals; Billy Greer – bass, acoustic guitar, vocals; David Ragsdale – violin, rhythm guitar, backing vocals; Ronnie Platt – vocals, keyboards; Zak Rizvi – lead guitar, backing vocals; Tom Brislin – keyboards, vocals	The Absence of Presence (2020); Point of Know Return Live & Beyond (2021)
April 2021 – May 2023	Phil Ehart – drums, percussion; Rich Williams – lead guitar, backing vocals; Billy Greer – bass, acoustic guitar, vocals; David Ragsdale – violin, rhythm guitar, backing vocals; Ronnie Platt – vocals, keyboards; Tom Brislin – keyboards, vocals	none
May 2023 – April 2024	Phil Ehart – drums, percussion; Rich Williams – lead guitar, backing vocals; Billy Greer – bass, acoustic guitar, vocals; Ronnie Platt – vocals, keyboards; Tom Brislin – keyboards, vocals; Joe Deninzon – violin, rhythm guitar, backing vocals	none
April 2024 – September 2024	Phil Ehart – drums, percussion; Rich Williams – rhythm and lead guitar, backing vocals; Billy Greer – bass, acoustic guitar, vocals; Ronnie Platt – vocals, keyboards; Tom Brislin – keyboards, vocals; Joe Deninzon – violin, rhythm guitar, backing vocals; Zak Rizvi – lead guitar, backing vocals	none
September 2024 –	Phil Ehart – drums, percussion; Rich Williams – rhythm and lead guitar, backing vocals; Ronnie Platt – vocals, keyboards; Tom Brislin – keyboards, vocals; Joe Deninzon – violin, rhythm guitar, backing vocals; Zak Rizvi – lead guitar, backing vocals; Dan McGowan – bass, vocals	none to date
