= The Best of Kansas =

Greatest hits album by Kansas
- Released: July 31, 1984
- Recorded: 1974–1984
- Studios: Pakaderm Studios, Long Beach, California ("Perfect Lover")
- Genres: Hard rock, progressive rock
- Length: 48:11
- Labels: CBS Associated, Epic
- Producer: Various

Kansas chronology
Drastic Measures (1983)	The Best of Kansas (1984)	Power (1986)

Professional ratings
Review scores
Source	Rating
AllMusic	4/5 stars
The Rolling Stone Album Guide	2.5/5 stars

The Best of Kansas is the first compilation by American progressive rock band Kansas. Originally released in 1984, it featured the new "Perfect Lover," written by then-lead vocalist John Elefante and his brother Dino Elefante.

The compilation was rereleased in 1999 in a version supervised by the original band members. "Perfect Lover" was dropped in favor of three additional tracks from the original lineup: "The Pinnacle" from Masque, "The Devil Game" from Song for America, and a live track deleted owing to space limitations from the CD version of Two for the Show called "Closet Chronicles," originally from Point of Know Return.

The album has sold over 4 million copies in the United States and was certified quadruple platinum in 2001.

The versions of "Carry On Wayward Son" and "The Wall" on the 1984 release of The Best of Kansas are remixed by Kerry Livgren and unique to the first version of this collection. For the 1999 reissue of the collection, the original 1976 mixes from the album Leftoverture are used instead. The removal of "Perfect Lover" – previously available only on this album – made the track out of print in the United States. The original track listing and mixes were restored for the 2014 180-gram vinyl release of the album by Friday Music. That version was released on red vinyl a few years later.

== Cover art ==
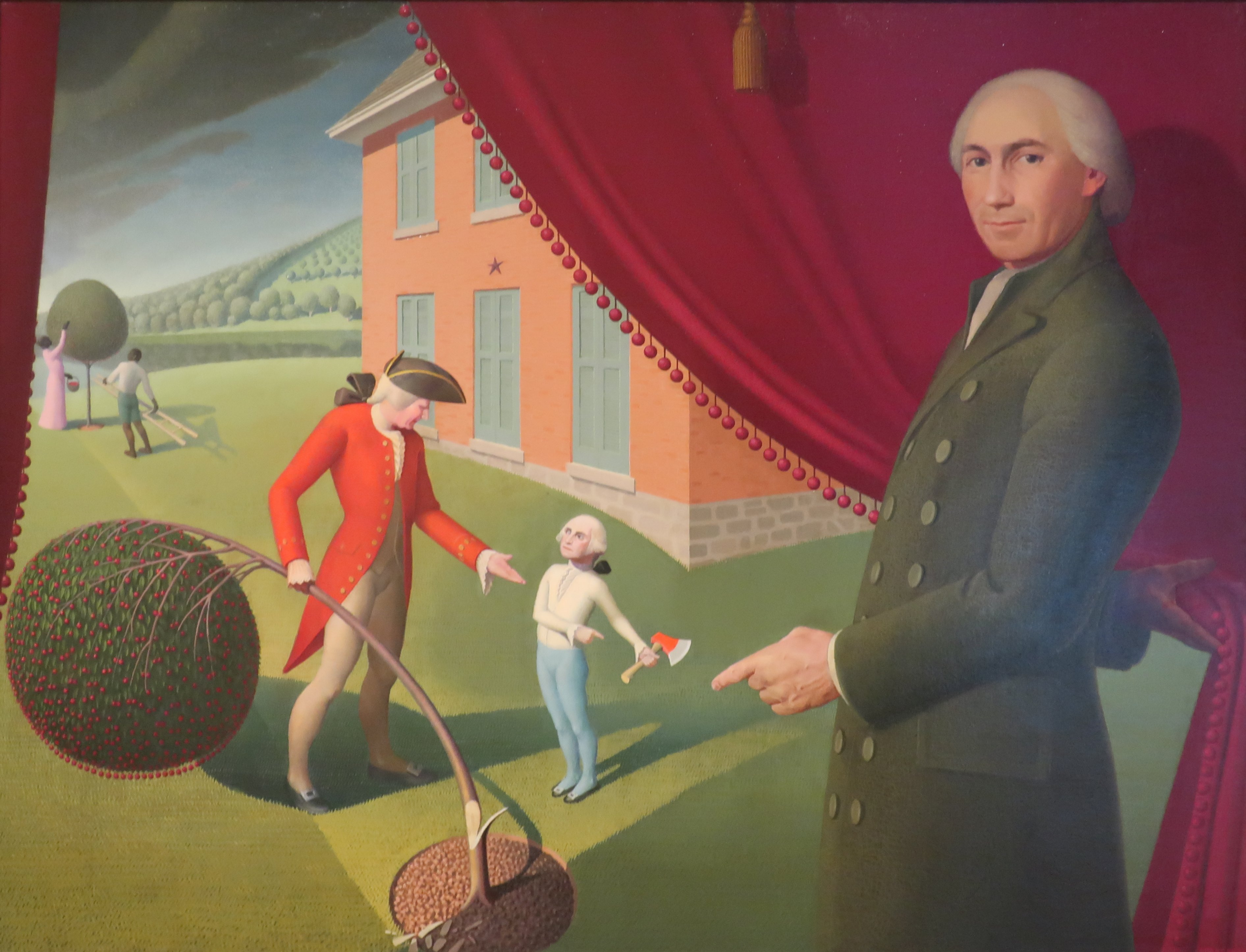
The painting of Parson Weems.

The album cover art, by artist Steve Carver, is a parody of Grant Wood's 1939 painting of the author Parson Weems pointing to the famous scene of George Washington and George's father inquiring after young George had just chopped down a cherry tree with his hatchet. The cover contains elements of nearly all previous Kansas album covers:

- Kansas: The man on the front cover is John Brown, as portrayed in the John Steuart Curry mural Tragic Prelude, which was used as the cover of Kansas' debut album. No tracks from the album appear on either version of The Best of Kansas.
- Song for America: The bird depicted on the front cover of Song for America can be found on the back cover, perched atop the track listing.
- Masque: The outline of a fish appears in John Brown's beard. The "face" on the cover of Masque (Giuseppe Arcimboldo's Water) is composed of various marine life. No tracks from Masque appear on the 1984 release.
- Leftoverture: The inkwell and scattered pages of sheet music appear on the back cover.
- Point of Know Return: The ship tipping over the edge of the world is on the front. The same ship appears on the cover of Sail On: The 30th Anniversary Collection.
- Two for the Show: The spotlights, stage, curtains, and figures in the audience are all indirect references; none of these things (besides an auditorium full of seats) are seen on Two for the Show. On the back cover, there is a mop behind the interrogation chair, which may reference to the cleaning ladies on the cover. No tracks from Two for the Show appear on the 1984 release.
- Monolith: On the back cover, the moon behind a shadow of the figure depicted on Monolith is seen through the open door. No tracks from Monolith appear on either version of The Best of Kansas.
- Audio-Visions: On the back cover, at the right side, one of the two hands on the front cover of Audio-Visions is holding the curtain.
- Vinyl Confessions: The interrogation chair is seen under a spotlight on the back cover.
- Drastic Measures: John Brown is wearing the black tuxedo and red bow tie worn by the bazooka "player".

== Track listing ==
=== 1984 original version ===
Side one
No.	Title	Writer(s)	Original album	Length
1.	"Carry On Wayward Son" (Remixed version)	Kerry Livgren	Leftoverture (1976)	5:22
2.	"Point of Know Return"	Steve Walsh, Phil Ehart, Robby Steinhardt	Point of Know Return (1977)	3:11
3.	"Fight Fire with Fire"	John Elefante, Dino Elefante	Drastic Measures (1983)	3:40
4.	"Dust in the Wind"	Livgren	Point of Know Return (1977)	3:27
5.	"Song for America" (Edited version)	Livgren	Song for America (1975)	9:08

Side two
No.	Title	Writer(s)	Original album	Length
6.	"Perfect Lover"	J. Elefante, D. Elefante	new song (1984)	4:19
7.	"Hold On"	Livgren	Audio-Visions (1980)	3:52
8.	"No One Together"	Livgren	Audio-Visions (1980)	6:57
9.	"Play the Game Tonight"	Livgren, Rich Williams, Ehart, Danny Flower, Rob Frazier	Vinyl Confessions (1982)	3:26
10.	"The Wall" (Remixed version)	Livgren, Walsh	Leftoverture (1976)	4:49

=== 1999 reissue ===
No.	Title	Writer(s)	Original album	Length
1.	"Carry On Wayward Son"	Livgren		5:22
2.	"Point of Know Return"	Walsh, Ehart, Steinhardt		3:11
3.	"Fight Fire with Fire"	J. Elefante, D. Elefante		3:40
4.	"Dust in the Wind"	Livgren		3:27
5.	"Song for America" (Edited version)	Livgren		9:07
6.	"Hold On"	Livgren		3:51
7.	"No One Together"	Livgren		6:57
8.	"Play the Game Tonight"	Livgren, Williams, Ehart, Flower, Frazier		3:26
9.	"The Wall"	Livgren, Walsh		4:47
10.	"The Pinnacle"	Livgren	Masque (1975)	9:36
11.	"The Devil Game"	Walsh, Dave Hope	Song for America	5:04
12.	"Closet Chronicles" (Live)	Walsh, Livgren	Two for the Show (1978)	6:54

== Personnel ==
- Steve Walsh - keyboards, vocals (except "Fight Fire with Fire". "Perfect Lover" and "Play the Game Tonight")
- John Elefante - keyboards, vocals (on "Fight Fire with Fire," "Perfect Lover" and "Play the Game Tonight")
- Robby Steinhardt - violin, vocals (except on "Fight Fire with Fire" and "Perfect Lover")
- Kerry Livgren - guitar, keyboards (except on Perfect Lover)
- Dave Hope - bass (except on Perfect Lover))
- Rich Williams - guitar (all tracks)
- Phil Ehart - drums (all tracks)

Additional personnel

- Dino Elefante - bass (on "Perfect Lover")
- Bryan Duncan - backing vocals (on "Perfect Lover")

Production

- "The Wall" and "Carry On Wayward Son" remixed by Livgren, Williams and Davey Moiré at Camp Dunwoody Studios, Dunwoody, Georgia, 1984
- "Perfect Lover" produced by Kansas, engineered by Kevin Elson, mixed by Neil Kernon at The Record Plant, Los Angeles, California, 1984

== Charts ==
Chart (1984)	Peak position
Canada Top Albums/CDs (RPM)	86
US Billboard 200	154

== Certifications ==
Region	Certification	Certified units/sales
United States (RIAA)	4× Platinum	4,000,000^{^}
^{^} Shipments figures based on certification alone.
