= The Ultimate Kansas =

Greatest hits album by Kansas
- Released: July 2, 2002
- Recorded: 1973–83
- Genre: Progressive rock
- Label: Epic/Legacy
- Producer: Various

Kansas chronology
Device – Voice – Drum (2002)	The Ultimate Kansas (2002)	Sail On: The 30th Anniversary Collection (2004)

The Ultimate Kansas is the fourth compilation from the band Kansas. It was originally released in 2002, and focuses solely on their Kirshner period from their debut album Kansas in 1974, up to and including Drastic Measures in 1983. The collection was rereleased in 2008 under the title Essential Kansas 3.0 as part of the Sony/BMG Legacy series of that name, with an additional "bonus disc" with seven additional songs, and featuring "eco-friendly" packaging.

== Cover art ==
The covers of Leftoverture, Kansas, Point of Know Return, and Monolith are depicted on the front cover of The Ultimate Kansas.

Professional ratings
Review scores
Source	Rating
AllMusic	4.5/5 stars

== Track listing ==
=== Disc one ===
1. "Carry On Wayward Son" (Kerry Livgren) – 5:22
2. "Song for America" (Livgren) – 10:01
3. "The Wall" (Livgren, Steve Walsh) – 4:48
4. "Lonely Street" (Phil Ehart, Dave Hope, Walsh, Rich Williams) – 5:42
5. "Journey from Mariabronn" (Livgren, Walsh) – 7:57
6. "Child of Innocence" (Livgren) – 4:31
7. "Mysteries and Mayhem" (Livgren, Walsh) – 4:11
8. "The Pinnacle" (Livgren) – 9:35
9. "Bringing It Back" (J.J. Cale) – 3:34
10. "Down the Road" (Livgren, Walsh) – 3:44
11. "What's on My Mind" (Livgren) – 3:25
12. "Death of Mother Nature Suite" (Livgren) – 7:52

=== Disc two ===
1. "Point of Know Return" (Ehart, Robby Steinhardt, Walsh) – 3:12
2. "Cheyenne Anthem" (Livgren) – 6:53
3. "Fight Fire with Fire" (Dino Elefante, John Elefante) – 3:42
4. "Dust in the Wind" (Livgren) – 3:27
5. "Hold On" (Livgren) – 3:51
6. "No One Together" (Livgren) – 6:58
7. "Play the Game Tonight" (Ehart, Danny Flower, Rob Frazier, Livgren, Williams) – 3:27
8. "Closet Chronicles" (Walsh, Livgren) – 6:28
9. "Sparks of the Tempest" (Livgren, Walsh) – 4:12
10. "Portrait (He Knew)" (Livgren, Walsh) – 4:31
11. "On the Other Side" (Livgren) – 6:24
12. "People of the South Wind" (Livgren) – 3:36
13. "A Glimpse of Home" (Livgren) – 6:34
14. "Magnum Opus (Live)" (Ehart, Hope, Livgren, Steinhardt, Walsh, Williams) – 8:57

=== Disc three (The Essential Kansas 3.0 Limited Edition Only) ===
1. "Can I Tell You" (Ehart, Hope, Walsh, Williams) - 3:32
2. "Lamplight Symphony" (Livgren) - 8:15
3. "Miracles Out of Nowhere" (Livgren) - 6:27
4. "Questions of My Childhood" (Livgren, Walsh) - 3:37
5. "Paradox" (Livgren, Walsh) - 3:51
6. "The Spider" (Walsh) - 2:07
7. "Got to Rock On" (Walsh) - 3:21

== Personnel ==
- Phil Ehart – drums
- John Elefante – keyboards, vocals
- Dave Hope – bass guitar
- Kerry Livgren – guitars, keyboards
- Robby Steinhardt – violin, vocals
- Steve Walsh – keyboards, vocals
- Rich Williams – guitar
