= The Kansas Boxed Set =

- Cover art by Barron Storey

Box set by Kansas
- Released: July 12, 1994
- Recorded: 1974–1979, 1994
- Genre: Progressive rock
- Length: 1:58:18 (1994)
- Label: Legacy/Epic
- Producer: Various

Kansas chronology
Live at the Whisky (1992)	The Kansas Boxed Set (1994)	Freaks of Nature (1995)

Professional ratings
Review scores
Source	Rating
AllMusic	4/5 stars
The Rolling Stone Album Guide	2/5 stars

The Kansas Boxed Set is the third compilation from the band Kansas. It was originally released in 1994, and was the band's first boxed set overview. It focuses solely on the original line-up of the band, from their first album in 1974 to Audio-Visions in 1980. It also includes a new track "Wheels". The release was supervised by all the original band members, unlike the first release of The Best of Kansas in 1984.

== Track listing ==
All songs written by Kerry Livgren, except where noted.

=== Disc one ===
1. "Can I Tell You" (Rich Williams, Phil Ehart, Dave Hope, Steve Walsh) – 4:20 (1973 demo)
2. "Death of Mother Nature Suite" (live) – 9:00
3. "Journey from Mariabronn" (Livgren, Walsh) – 7:57
4. "Song for America" – 10:02
5. "The Devil Game" (Walsh, Hope) – 5:04
6. "Incomudro - Hymn to the Atman" (live) – 16:08
7. "Child of Innocence" – 4:33
8. "Icarus - Borne on Wings of Steel" – 6:04
9. "Mysteries and Mayhem" (Livgren, Walsh) – 4:20
10. "The Pinnacle" – 9:36

=== Disc two ===
1. "Carry On Wayward Son" – 5:22
2. "The Wall" (Livgren, Walsh) – 4:47
3. "What's on My Mind" – 3:27
4. "Opus Insert" – 4:25
5. "Magnum Opus" (Livgren, Walsh, Williams, Hope, Ehart, Robby Steinhardt) – 8:25
6. "Point of Know Return" (Walsh, Ehart, Steinhardt) – 3:12
7. "Portrait (He Knew)" (Livgren, Walsh) – 4:34
8. "Dust in the Wind" – 3:29
9. "Closet Chronicles" (Walsh, Livgren) – 6:31
10. "People of the South Wind" – 3:39
11. "On the Other Side" (live) – 6:43
12. "A Glimpse of Home" – 6:36
13. "Relentless" – 4:57
14. "Loner" (Walsh) – 2:30
15. "Hold On" – 3:53
16. "Wheels" (Livgren, Walsh) – 4:32 (new track)

== Personnel ==
Kansas

- Steve Walsh - keyboards, vocals
- Kerry Livgren - guitars, keyboards
- Robby Steinhardt - violin, vocals
- Rich Williams - guitar
- Dave Hope - bass guitar
- Phil Ehart - drums
- David Ragsdale - violin on "Wheels"

Production

- Jeff Glixman, Vic Anesini - remastering
- "Wheels" produced by Ehart, Livgren and Walsh, mixed by Jeff Glixman
