= Always Never the Same (Kansas album) =

Studio album by Kansas
- Released: May 19, 1998
- Recorded: September 1997 – February 1998
- Studio: Southern Tracks, Electric Landlady and Tree Sound Studios, Atlanta, Georgia, Abbey Road Studios, London, UK (Orchestra recordings)
- Genre: Symphonic rock
- Length: 71:05
- Label: River North (US); Edsel (Europe); Victor (Japan)
- Producer: Phil Ehart, Rich Williams, Trammell Starks

Kansas chronology
| Freaks of Nature (1995) | Always Never the Same (1998) | King Biscuit Flower Hour Presents Kansas (1998) |

Professional ratings
Review scores
| Source | Rating |
|---|---|
| AllMusic | 3/5 stars |
| The Rolling Stone Album Guide | 1/5 stars |

Always Never the Same is the thirteenth studio album by American rock band Kansas, released in 1998. This album consists of mostly covers of the band’s previous work, re-recorded with the London Symphony Orchestra. New songs include "In Your Eyes", "The Sky Is Falling", "Need to Know" and the instrumental "Preamble". "Prelude & Introduction" is a medley of the Kansas songs "Carry On Wayward Son", "Point of Know Return", "Opus Insert", and "Lamplight Symphony". The album also includes a cover of The Beatles’ "Eleanor Rigby". "Carry On Wayward Son" was also recorded during this time, in case strong sales would bring forth a second symphonic album, but was never released. This is the final Kansas album to include songs written by lead singer and keyboardist Steve Walsh.

== Track listing ==
| No. | Title | Writer(s) | Originally from the album | Length |
|---|---|---|---|---|
| 1. | "Eleanor Rigby" (The Beatles cover) | John Lennon, Paul McCartney | | 3:22 |
| 2. | "Dust in the Wind" | Kerry Livgren | Point of Know Return (1977) | 4:01 |
| 3. | "Preamble" (orchestral) | Larry Baird | | 3:25 |
| 4. | "Song for America" | Livgren | Song for America (1975) | 9:15 |
| 5. | "In Your Eyes" (new song) | Steve Walsh | | 4:30 |
| 6. | "Miracles Out of Nowhere" | Livgren | Leftoverture (1976) | 6:27 |
| 7. | "Hold On" | Livgren | Audio-Visions (1980) | 4:18 |
| 8. | "The Sky Is Falling" (new song) | Walsh | | 7:50 |
| 9. | "Cheyenne Anthem" | Livgren | Leftoverture | 7:29 |
| 10. | "Prelude & Introduction" (medley) | Phil Ehart, Billy Greer, Robby Steinhardt, Walsh, Rich Williams, Baird | | 4:53 |
| 11. | "The Wall" | Livgren, Walsh | Leftoverture | 5:29 |
| 12. | "Need to Know" (new song) | Walsh | | 4:02 |
| 13. | "Nobody’s Home" | Livgren, Walsh | Point of Know Return | 6:04 |

== Personnel ==
Kansas

- Steve Walsh – keyboards, lead vocals
- Robby Steinhardt – violin, lead and backing vocals
- Rich Williams – guitars, producer
- Billy Greer – bass, vocals
- Phil Ehart – drums, producer

Additional musicians

- The London Symphony Orchestra, arranged and conducted by Larry Baird

Production

- Trammell Starks – producer, digital editing
- Russ Fowler, James Majors, Jim "Z" Zumpano – engineers
- Peter Cobbin – orchestra recordings engineer
- Jeff Glixman – mixing at Tree Sound Studios, Atlanta, Georgia
- Greg Calbi – mastering at Masterdisk, New York
- Brian Jobson, James Majors – digital editing
- Michael Allen – copyist
- Pennie Moore, Conni Treantafeles – art direction and design
- Marti Griffin – photography
