= Point of Know Return (song) =

1977 single by Kansas

- German cover

Single by Kansas

from the album Point of Know Return
- B-side: "Closet Chronicles"
- Released: October 1977
- Recorded: June–July 1977
- Genre: Progressive rock; progressive pop
- Length: 3:13
- Songwriters: Steve Walsh, Robby Steinhardt, Phil Ehart
- Producer: Jeff Glixman

Kansas singles chronology
"What's on My Mind" (1977)	"Point of Know Return" (1977)	"Dust in the Wind" (1978)

"Point of Know Return" is a song by the progressive rock band Kansas written by Steve Walsh (lyrics), Robby Steinhardt, and Phil Ehart (who suggested the album's title, which inspired the lyrics to the song) for their 1977 album Point of Know Return.

It has been re-released on many compilation and live albums, including The Best of Kansas, The Kansas Boxed Set, The Ultimate Kansas, Sail On: The 30th Anniversary Collection, Two for the Show, Live at the Whisky, King Biscuit Flower Hour Presents Kansas, Dust in the Wind, Device, Voice, Drum, and There's Know Place Like Home. Live video performances were also released on Device, Voice, Drum and There's Know Place Like Home. The musical publishing organization BMI presented certifications to the songwriters for over 2 million plays of the song in 2013, as part of the band's 40th anniversary celebration at a concert in Pittsburgh.

== Reception ==
Billboard described "Point of Know Return" as a "powerful high energy rocker" whose intensity is maintained throughout the song with keyboards and violins the most prominent instruments. Cash Box said that it contains "an ideal balance of pop and progressive elements, highlighted by the depth of vocal harmony that characterized ['Carry On Wayward Son']" and also has "tasteful use of rhythmic accents and Yes-inspired organ licks." Record World said that it is "a punchy rocker sparked by strong vocals, and a recurring violin/keyboard riff."

Ultimate Classic Rock critic Eduardo Rivadavia rated "Point of Know Return" as Kansas' 2nd greatest song, saying it "distills the group’s adventurous sound into three compact minutes." Classic Rock History critic Brian Kachejian rated it as Kansas' 4th greatest song, calling it "a great track that at the time, crossed the line between commercialism and substance." Classic Rock critic Dave Ling also ranked it as Kansas' 4th greatest song. I Love Classic Rock rated as one of the "Top 10 Kansas Songs Everyone Should Hear At Least Once In Their Lives" and said that it "forms around the playful and inventive violin showmanship" and "packs the intensity and substance that was evident in Leftoverture."

== Personnel ==
- Steve Walsh – lead vocals, keyboards
- Robby Steinhardt – violin, backing vocals
- Kerry Livgren – guitar
- Rich Williams – guitar
- Dave Hope – bass
- Phil Ehart – drums

== Charts ==
Chart (1977–1978)	Peak position
Canada Top Singles (RPM)	13
US Billboard Hot 100	28
US Cash Box Hot 100	17
