= King Biscuit Flower Hour Presents Kansas =

Live album by Kansas
- Released: October 20, 1998
- Recorded: February 14, 1989
- Venue: Tower Theater (Philadelphia)
- Genre: Progressive rock
- Length: 65:54
- Label: King Biscuit Flower Hour
- Producer: Kevin T. Cain, Steven Ship

Kansas chronology
Always Never the Same (1998)	King Biscuit Flower Hour Presents Kansas (1998)	Somewhere to Elsewhere (2000)

Dust in the Wind album cover

2003 re-release cover art
- The album was also retitled Kansas: Greatest Hits Live.

Professional ratings
Review scores
Source	Rating
AllMusic	3.5/5 stars

King Biscuit Flower Hour Presents Kansas is the third live album from American rock band Kansas, released in 1998 (see 1998 in music). In the UK it was released as Live on the King Biscuit Flower Hour, and in 2003 it was re-released as Greatest Hits Live (see below).

The album was recorded on February 14, 1989, at the Tower Theater in Philadelphia during their In the Spirit of Things tour and featured performances by Steve Walsh and Steve Morse. Two tracks from the original performance were omitted from the release: "Play the Game Tonight" and a cover of "Born to Be Wild." The liner notes include an extensive essay describing this era of the band and the circumstances surrounding the album and tour supporting it during which this show was recorded.

The same recordings have subsequently appeared on releases with different track order. In 2001, the same concert was released on the album Dust in the Wind by Disky Communications Europe (see below). It was also released on DVD-Audio format as From the Front Row Live, in a series of unclear licensing status and which apparently contained stereo sources attempted upmixed to multi-channel.

== Track listings ==
King Biscuit Flower Hour Presents Kansas and other versions releases by King Biscuit Flower Hour Records

1. "Magnum Opus" (Kerry Livgren, Steve Walsh, Rich Williams, Dave Hope, Phil Ehart, Robby Steinhardt) – 2:12
2. "One Big Sky" (Howard Kleinfeld, Michael Dan Ehmig, Ehart, Walsh, Bob Ezrin) – 6:11
3. "Paradox" (Livgren, Walsh) – 4:11
4. "Point of Know Return" (Walsh, Ehart, Steinhardt) – 5:16
5. "The Wall" (Livgren, Walsh) – 6:04
6. "All I Wanted" (Walsh, Steve Morse) – 5:29
7. "T.O. Witcher" (Morse, Walsh) – 1:42
8. "Dust in the Wind" (Livgren) – 4:27
9. "Miracles Out of Nowhere" (Livgren) – 6:47
10. "The Preacher" (Walsh, Morse) – 4:57
11. "House on Fire" (Walsh, Morse, Ezrin, Ehart) – 12:12
12. "Carry On Wayward Son" (Livgren) – 6:26

Dust in the Wind

1. "Miracles Out of Nowhere" – 6:47
2. "Paradox" – 4:11
3. "One Big Sky" – 6:06
4. "T.O. Witcher" – 1:37
5. "Dust in the Wind" – 4:24
6. "The Preacher" – 4:57
7. "Point of Know Return" – 5:03
8. "House on Fire" – 12:05
9. "Carry On Wayward Son" – 6:20
10. "All I Wanted" – 4:53
11. "Magnum Opus" – 2:12
12. "The Wall" – 5:43

== Personnel ==
Kansas

- Steve Walsh - vocals, keyboards
- Steve Morse - guitar
- Rich Williams - guitar
- Greg Robert - additional keyboards
- Billy Greer - bass
- Phil Ehart - drums

Production

- Kevin T. Cain, Steven Ship - executive producers
- Tom Volpicelli - engineer
- Joe Mattis - mixing
- Dixon Van Winkle - mastering
