= Carry On (Kansas album) =

Greatest hits album by Kansas
- Released: 1992
- Genre: Progressive rock
- Length: 41:25
- Label: BMG Special Products
- Producer: Various

Kansas chronology
In the Spirit of Things (1988)	Carry On (1992)	Live at the Whisky (1992)

Cover art for On the Other Side

Carry On is the second compilation from American rock band Kansas, released in 1992. It was later repackaged and re-released in 2005 as On the Other Side (see below); also, "Play the Game Tonight" and "Don't Take Your Love Away" were replaced with "What's on My Mind" and "Child of Innocence."

== Track listing ==
All songs written by Kerry Livgren, except where noted.

1. "Carry On Wayward Son" – 5:23
2. "What's on My Mind" – 3:28
3. "The Wall" (Livgren, Steve Walsh) – 4:47
4. "Dust in the Wind" – 3:25
5. "Can I Tell You" (Phil Ehart, Dave Hope, Walsh, Rich Williams) – 3:33
6. "People of the South Wind" – 3:38
7. "It Takes a Woman's Love (To Make a Man)" (Walsh) – 3:06
8. "Child of Innocence" – 4:35
9. "Two Cents Worth" (Livgren, Walsh) – 3:08
10. "On the Other Side" – 6:22

== Personnel ==
- Phil Ehart – drums
- Dave Hope – bass
- Kerry Livgren – guitar, keyboards
- Robby Steinhardt – violin, vocals, anvil
- Steve Walsh – keyboards, vocals
- Rich Williams – guitar
