= Two for the Show (Kansas album) =

- Cover photo inspired by Norman Rockwell's painting "The Charwomen"

Live album by Kansas
- Released: October 1978
- Recorded: 1977, 1978 with Record Plant Mobile Recording Unit
- Venues: The Palladium, New York City; Pine Knob Music Theatre, Clarkston, Michigan; Merriweather Post Pavilion, Columbia, Maryland
- Genre: Progressive rock • hard rock
- Length: 80:12 (original album); 148:22 (2008 expanded and remastered edition)
- Labels: Kirshner/CBS, Epic
- Producer: Kansas

Kansas chronology
Point of Know Return (1977)	Two for the Show (1978)	Monolith (1979)

Singles from Two for the Show
- 1. "Lonely Wind" Released: January 1979

Professional ratings
Review scores
Source	Rating
AllMusic	2/5 stars
Music Week	3/4 stars
The Rolling Stone Album Guide	1/5 stars

Two for the Show is the first live album by American progressive rock band Kansas, released in 1978. The album was recorded over the course of the band's three previous tours in 1977 and 1978. It was certified Gold and then Platinum shortly after its release. In 2008, a remastered and expanded edition was released to commemorate the album's 30th anniversary.

One single, "Lonely Wind," was released from the album. The single version was edited to under 3 minutes, and included a small amount of the piano solo that precedes it on the album. It received a reasonable amount of airplay and rose to No. 60 on the pop charts. Record World called it "a characteristic Kansas ballad with a lush high harmony hook."

In addition, Kirshner Records issued a promotional album of edited selections from the release, entitled Kansas Mini Concert on the spine and label, and Two for the Show Special Limited Edition on the cover. It features "Lonely Wind," "Dust in the Wind," "Song for America," and "The Wall." The same songs appear on both sides, and the first side is unbanded, meaning there is no indication on the vinyl of where each song begins. This promo album was issued with both a black and a white cover.

== Track listing ==
Side one
No.	Title	Writer(s)	Original Album	Length
1.	"Song for America"	Kerry Livgren	Song for America (1975)	7:31
2.	"Point of Know Return"	Steve Walsh, Phil Ehart, Robby Steinhardt	Point of Know Return (1977)	3:07
3.	"Paradox"	Livgren, Walsh	Point of Know Return	4:09
4.	"Icarus - Borne on Wings of Steel"	Livgren	Masque (1975)	5:58

Side two
No.	Title	Writer(s)	Original Album	Length
5.	"Portrait (He Knew)"	Livgren, Walsh	Point of Know Return	5:19
6.	"Carry On Wayward Son"	Livgren	Leftoverture (1976)	4:38
7.	"Journey from Mariabronn"	Livgren, Walsh	Kansas (1974)	8:55

Side three
No.	Title	Writer(s)	Original Album	Length
1.	"Dust in the Wind" (featuring Rich Williams acoustic guitar solo)	Livgren	Point of Know Return	6:19
2.	"Lonely Wind" (featuring Kerry Livgren piano solo)	Walsh	Kansas	4:29
3.	"Mysteries and Mayhem"	Livgren, Walsh	Masque	4:01
4.	"Excerpt from Lamplight Symphony"	Livgren	Song for America	2:39
5.	"The Wall"	Livgren, Walsh	Leftoverture	4:54

Side four
No.	Title	Writer(s)	Original Album	Length
6.	"Closet Chronicles"	Walsh, Livgren	Point of Know Return	6:55
7.	"Magnum Opus": a. "Father Padilla Meets the Perfect Gnat"; b. "Howling at the Moon"; c. "Man Overboard"; d. "Industry on Parade"; e. "Release the Beavers"; f. "Gnat Attack"	Livgren, Walsh, Rich Williams, Dave Hope, Ehart, Steinhardt	Leftoverture	11:18

* "Closet Chronicles" was omitted from the original CD release due to time constraints but appears on the remastered version of The Best of Kansas released in 1999, and appears on the second CD of the remastered version of Two for the Show.

=== 2008 remastered version ===
Two for the Show was re-released as a 2-CD set in 2008 to commemorate the 30th Anniversary of the album with a second disc of songs that did not appear on the original album (except "Closet Chronicles" which was included on the original vinyl, excluded from the original CD release, and appears here on the second CD along with the bonus material) and a 24-page booklet.

Disc one
No.	Title	Writer(s)	Original Album	Length
1.	"Song for America"	Livgren	Song for America	7:29
2.	"Point of Know Return"	Walsh, Ehart, Steinhardt	Point of Know Return	3:07
3.	"Paradox"	Livgren, Walsh	Point of Know Return	4:09
4.	"Icarus - Borne on Wings of Steel"	Livgren	Masque	5:58
5.	"Portrait (He Knew)"	Livgren, Walsh	Point of Know Return	5:18
6.	"Carry On Wayward Son"	Livgren	Leftoverture	4:38
7.	"Journey from Mariabronn"	Livgren, Walsh	Kansas	8:55
8.	"Dust in the Wind" (featuring Rich Williams acoustic guitar solo)	Livgren	Point of Know Return	6:17
9.	"Lonely Wind" (featuring Kerry Livgren piano solo)	Walsh	Kansas	4:29
10.	"Mysteries and Mayhem"	Livgren, Walsh	Masque	4:00
11.	"Excerpt from Lamplight Symphony"	Livgren	Song for America	2:38
12.	"The Wall"	Livgren, Walsh	Leftoverture	4:58
13.	"Magnum Opus: a. Father Padilla Meets the Perfect Gnat; b. Howling at the Moon; c. Man Overboard; d. Industry on Parade; e. Release the Beavers; f. Gnat Attack"	Livgren, Walsh, Williams, Hope, Ehart, Steinhardt	Leftoverture	11:14

Disc two
No.	Title	Writer(s)	Original Album	Length
1.	"Incomudro - Hymn to the Atman (Intro)/Hopelessly Human"	Livgren	Song for America/Point of Know Return	8:42
2.	"Child of Innocence"	Livgren	Masque	7:47
3.	"Belexes"	Livgren	Kansas	4:34
4.	"Cheyenne Anthem"	Livgren	Leftoverture	6:55
5.	"Lonely Street"	Walsh, Hope, Williams, Ehart	Song for America	8:20
6.	"Miracles Out of Nowhere"	Livgren	Leftoverture	7:59
7.	"The Spider" (featuring Phil Ehart drum solo)	Walsh	Point of Know Return	7:41
8.	"Closet Chronicles"	Walsh, Livgren	Point of Know Return	6:55
9.	"Down the Road"	Walsh, Livgren	Song for America	3:44
10.	"Sparks of the Tempest"	Livgren, Walsh	Point of Know Return	5:19
11.	"Bringing It Back"	J.J. Cale	Kansas	7:07

All of the bonus tracks were recorded at the time of the recording of the album but omitted from the original album for various reasons including time constraints. Different live versions of "Bringing It Back," "Down the Road," "Cheyenne Anthem," and "Sparks of the Tempest" appeared as bonus tracks on the remastered versions of Kansas, Song for America, Leftoverture, and Point of Know Return respectively. A different, earlier live version of "Lonely Street" appears as a bonus track on the later recorded U.S. version Live at the Whiskey (a different live version of "Belexes" and "Journey from Mariabronn" appear as a single bonus track on the German version of this release, available on iTunes and Apple Music)

In 2010, Legacy released the Kansas entry in Legacy's Boxed Set series known as The Music of Kansas. The third disc from this box set is culled entirely from the double CD version of this album, featuring live cuts from both the original and expanded release, marking the first compilation to feature any of the previously unreleased tracks. A four disc version of this release was also issued a year later.

== Personnel ==
Kansas

- Steve Walsh – keyboards, vocals
- Robby Steinhardt – violins, vocals
- Kerry Livgren – guitars, keyboards
- Rich Williams – guitars
- Dave Hope – bass
- Phil Ehart – percussion, drums

Production

- Kansas - producer, cover concept
- Davey Moiré - engineer
- Brad Aaron - associate engineer
- Dave Hewitt - Record Plant Mobile engineer
- George Marino - mastering at Sterling Sound, New York
- Tom Drennon - art direction and design
- Jim Barrett - illustration
- Raul Vega, Terry Ehart, Andy Freeberg, Darryl Pitt, Neal Preston - photography

2008 remastering

- Phil Ehart – producer
- Jeff Glixman - producer, mixing and mastering of the remastered edition
- Jeff Magid - remastered edition producer
- Zak Rizvi, John Andreas - remastered edition mixing
- Brian Fanning, Frank Tozour - sony PQ editing

== Charts ==
Chart (1978)	Peak position
Australian Albums (Kent Music Report)	95
Canada Top Albums/CDs (RPM)	29
US Billboard 200	32

== Certifications ==
Region	Certification	Certified units/sales
United States (RIAA)	Platinum	1,000,000^{^}
^{^} Shipments figures based on certification alone.
