= Live at the Whisky =

1992 live album by Kansas

Live album by Kansas
- Released: July 7, 1992
- Recorded: April 5, 1992, with Le Mobile Recording Facility
- Venue: Whisky a Go Go, Los Angeles, California
- Genre: Progressive rock
- Length: 70:53
- Label: Intersound
- Producer: Phil Ehart, Jeff Glixman

Kansas chronology
Carry On (1992)	Live at the Whisky (1992)	The Kansas Boxed Set (1994)

Live at the Whisky

Video by Kansas
- Released: July 7, 1992
- Recorded: April 5, 1992
- Venue: Whisky a Go Go, Los Angeles, California
- Genre: Progressive rock
- Length: 65 min.
- Label: Intersound
- Producer: Phil Ehart, Jeff Glixman

Kansas video albums chronology
Live (1984)	Live at the Whisky (1992)	Device – Voice – Drum (2002)

Live at the Whisky is the second live recording by American rock band Kansas, released in 1992. The U.S. version includes a bonus track "Lonely Street" from 1975. A German version of the release contains an alternative bonus track, "Journey from Mariabronn" which actually includes both "Belexes" and "Journey from Mariabronn" together from that same show. The German bonus track is also available on iTunes, Napster, and other streaming services.

The album notes state that it was recorded in "one take", and has been criticized by some because of the harsh vocals of singer Steve Walsh, whose voice was failing at that time as a result of a variety of issues, including fatigue and substance abuse. It was the first official Kansas release (other than compilations) not to reach the album charts, and also the first not released on a major record label.

Walsh has stated in interviews that the recording of this CD and video was doomed from the beginning and he is embarrassed of anything that has to do with it. Since the band was funding this CD and video themselves, to save money, the band used videotape instead of film, which caused problems during the filming. Excessive lighting had to be used on stage so the videotape would pick up all the images which then led to excessive heat on stage making the performers sweat which was rather unflattering when watching the finished product. A filter was used during editing that softened the images but it caused the picture to look distorted making purchasers wonder if they had received a defective item.

While the recording of the band was recorded in one take, the vocal track was not and was overdubbed at a later date. Walsh has said this was a very difficult time for him when it came to his substance abuse. He was smoking pot and using cocaine on a daily basis as well as drinking excessively, which caused him to be exhausted and run down so on top of all of those things he also happened to be sick that night. Walsh has also stated that the band has no plans on re-releasing the video in its entirety, they consider it an embarrassment and consider fans lucky if they have a copy. There is a "Director's cut" with extra performances of the video that has surfaced in recent years with the original vocal track intact and without the use of the softening filter.

Professional ratings
Review scores
Source	Rating
AllMusic	2.5/5 stars

== CD and VHS track listings ==
No.	Title	Writer(s)	Length
1.	"Introduction"		1:04
2.	"Howlin' at the Moon" (from "Magnum Opus")	Kerry Livgren, Steve Walsh, Rich Williams, Dave Hope, Phil Ehart, Robby Steinhardt	1:31
3.	"Paradox"	Livgren, Walsh	4:11
4.	"Point of Know Return"	Walsh, Ehart, Steinhardt	4:44
5.	"Song for America"	Livgren	8:57
6.	"The Wall"	Livgren, Walsh	6:07
7.	"Hold On"	Livgren	4:18
8.	"Dust in the Wind"	Livgren	3:52
9.	"Miracles Out of Nowhere"	Livgren	6:30
10.	"Mysteries and Mayhem"	Livgren, Walsh	4:54
11.	"Portrait (He Knew)"	Livgren, Walsh	5:45
12.	"Carry on Wayward Son"	Livgren	6:51
13.	"Down the Road"	Walsh, Livgren	5:51

CD bonus track
No.	Title	Writer(s)	Length
14.	"Lonely Street" (recorded in 1975 at the Agora Ballroom in Cleveland, Ohio)	Walsh, Hope, Williams, Ehart	6:28

German CD edition bonus track (also available on U.S. streaming services)
No.	Title	Writer(s)	Length
14.	"Journey from Mariabronn (also includes hidden track Belexes)"	Walsh, Livgren	12:11

== Personnel ==
Kansas

- Steve Walsh – vocals, keyboards
- Rich Williams – guitar
- David Ragsdale – violin, guitar, backing vocals
- Greg Robert – keyboards, backing vocals
- Billy Greer – bass guitar, backing and additional lead vocals
- Phil Ehart – drums, producer

Guest musicians

- Kerry Livgren – guitar on "Dust in the Wind", "Carry On Wayward Son" and "Lonely Street"
- Dave Hope – bass guitar on "Lonely Street"

Production

- Jeff Glixman – producer, mixing at Triclops Sound Studio, Atlanta, Georgia
- Guy Charbonneau – live recording engineer
- Mark Richardson – mixing assistant
- Kevin Reeves – digital editing
- Wally Traugott – digital mastering at Capitol Studios, Los Angeles, California
- Steven Parke – cover illustration
- Laurie Anderson – graphic design
- Scott Larsen – art direction
- Ginny Nichols – photography
