= Somewhere to Elsewhere =

Studio album by Kansas
- Released: July 11, 2000
- Recorded: 1999
- Studio: GrandyZine Recording Co., Berryton, Kansas
- Genre: Progressive rock, hard rock
- Length: 68:13
- Label: Magna Carta
- Producer: Kerry Livgren, Phil Ehart, Rich Williams

Kansas chronology
King Biscuit Flower Hour Presents Kansas (1998)	Somewhere to Elsewhere (2000)	Sail On: The 30th Anniversary Collection (2001)

Professional ratings
Review scores
Source	Rating
AllMusic	4/5 stars
The Rolling Stone Album Guide	1/5 stars

Somewhere to Elsewhere is the fourteenth studio album by American rock band Kansas, released in 2000. It is Kansas' first album to feature the band's original lineup (though they never were actually all together in the studio during the recording sessions) since 1980's Audio-Visions, along with Billy Greer, who joined the band in 1985. Steve Walsh tracked vocals in his home studio while working on his second solo album Glossolalia and did not join the rest of the band at Kerry Livgren's studio. His contribution were solely vocals. Livgren composed all of the album's tracks, and the hidden track "Geodesic Dome" is his first and only lead vocal on a Kansas song. Somewhere to Elsewhere is Kansas' last studio album to feature both Robby Steinhardt, who left the band in 2006 and died in 2021, and Steve Walsh, who left the band in 2014.

== Track listing ==
All songs written by Kerry Livgren.

Side one
No.	Title	Lead vocals	Length
1.	"Icarus II"	Steve Walsh	7:17
2.	"When the World Was Young"	Walsh	5:50
3.	"Grand Fun Alley"	Robby Steinhardt	4:38
4.	"The Coming Dawn (Thanatopsis)"	Walsh	5:44
5.	"Myriad"	Walsh	8:55
6.	"Look at the Time"	Billy Greer	5:37
7.	"Disappearing Skin Tight Blues"	Steinhardt	7:02
8.	"Distant Vision"	Walsh and Steinhardt	8:48
9.	"Byzantium"	Walsh	4:15
10.	"Not Man Big"	Walsh	8:39
11.	"Geodesic Dome" (hidden track)	Kerry Livgren	1:24

== Personnel ==
Kansas

- Steve Walsh - lead and backing vocals
- Kerry Livgren - guitars, keyboards, producer, engineer, mixing, lead vocals on track 11
- Robby Steinhardt - violin, viola, lead and backing vocals
- Rich Williams - guitars, producer
- Billy Greer - bass guitar, backing vocals, lead vocals on track 6
- Dave Hope - bass guitar on tracks 2 and 6
- Phil Ehart - drums, producer

Additional musicians

- Jake Livgren, Jessica Livgren, "Not Man Big Men Chorus" - additional background vocals

Production

- Brad Aaron - engineer, mixing

== Charts ==
Album

Year	Chart	Position
2000	Top Internet Albums (US)	13
2000	Top Independent Albums (US)	21
