= Device – Voice – Drum =

Video by Kansas
- Released: October 8, 2002
- Recorded: June 15, 2002
- Venue: Earthlink Live!, Atlanta, Georgia
- Genre: Progressive rock
- Length: 124:43
- Label: Compendia (US and Japan); SPV (Europe)
- Director: Michie Turpin
- Producer: Phil Ehart, Steve Rawls

Kansas video chronology
Live at the Whisky (1992)	Device – Voice – Drum (2002)	Works in Progress (2006)

Device – Voice – Drum

Live album by Kansas
- Released: October 8, 2002
- Recorded: June 15, 2002
- Venue: Earthlink Live!, Atlanta, Georgia
- Genre: Progressive rock
- Length: 108:36
- Label: Compendia (US and Japan); SPV (Europe)
- Producer: Phil Ehart, Steve Rawls

Kansas chronology
Dust in the Wind (2001)	Device – Voice – Drum (2002)	The Ultimate Kansas (2002)

Device – Voice – Drum is a live DVD by American rock band Kansas, released in 2002. The same concert was released as an enhanced double-CD live album. The CD release features the enhanced live track, "Distant Vision".

The DVD includes a short Animusic animation of a portion of the song "Miracles Out of Nowhere". Animusic also provided the CD/DVD cover art. Sketches of the members of the band by artist Clifford Bailey are featured in the liner notes.

== Track listings ==
All songs written by Kerry Livgren, except where noted.

=== DVD track listing ===
1. "Intro" – 1:26
2. "Belexes"/"Lightning's Hand" (Livgren/Livgren, Walsh) – 6:43
3. "Icarus II" – 7:12
4. "Icarus - Borne on Wings of Steel" – 6:27
5. "Song for America" – 9:27
6. "Howlin' at the Moon" (from "Magnum Opus") (Phil Ehart, Dave Hope, Livgren, Robby Steinhardt, Steve Walsh, Rich Williams) – 2:00
7. "The Wall" (Livgren, Walsh) – 5:43
8. "The Preacher" (Steve Morse, Walsh) – 4:18
9. "Journey from Mariabronn" (Livgren, Walsh) – 9:17
10. "Dust in the Wind" – 4:26
11. "Cheyenne Anthem" – 7:19
12. "Child of Innocence" – 4:54
13. "Miracles Out of Nowhere" – 6:36
14. "Point of Know Return" (Ehart, Steinhardt, Walsh) – 3:17
15. "Portrait (He Knew)"/"The Pinnacle" (Livgren, Walsh/Livgren) – 8:08
16. "Fight Fire with Fire" (John Elefante, Dino Elefante) – 3:19
17. "Play the Game Tonight" (Livgren, Williams, Ehart, Danny Flower, Rob Frazier) – 3:49
18. "Carry On Wayward Son" – 7:21

=== DVD bonus features ===
1. Looking Back – 3:05
2. DVD Thoughts – 3:11
3. Songs – 2:54
4. Making of Device, Voice, Drum – 7:25
5. Kansas Discography (with voice-over) – 4:23
6. Animusic Previews – 2:23
  - Instruments
    - Percussion instruments including the drum set
    - Bass guitar in "tower"
    - Calliope
    - Piano
    - Rock organ
    - Acoustic guitar
    - Organ stage lights
    - Lead synth lasers
    - Green electric guitar laser
    - Holographic electric violin with a laser
  - This Animusic animation has a Future Retro drum kit and its robotic drummer with two arms. The tower bass guitar (connected to this robot) is one of the Harmonic Voltage instruments. The violin laser is blue and sounds like an electric violin.

=== CD track listing ===
Disc one

1. "Intro" – 1:26
2. "Belexes"/"Lightning's Hand" – 6:43
3. "Icarus II" – 7:12
4. "Icarus - Borne on Wings of Steel" – 6:27
5. "Song for America" – 9:27
6. "Howlin' at the Moon" (from "Magnum Opus") – 2:00
7. "The Wall" – 5:43
8. "The Preacher" – 4:18
9. "Journey from Mariabronn" – 9:17
10. "Dust in the Wind" – 4:26
11. "Cheyenne Anthem" – 7:19
12. "Child of Innocence" – 4:54

Disc two

1. "Miracles Out of Nowhere" – 6:36
2. "Point of Know Return" – 3:17
3. "Portrait (He Knew)"/"The Pinnacle" – 8:08
4. "Fight Fire with Fire" – 3:19
5. "Play the Game Tonight" – 3:49
6. "Carry On Wayward Son" – 7:21
7. "Distant Vision" – 7:14 (live video)

== Personnel ==
Kansas

- Steve Walsh - keyboards, lead vocals
- Robby Steinhardt - violin, vocals
- Rich Williams - electric and acoustic guitars
- Billy Greer - bass, vocals, acoustic guitar
- Phil Ehart - drums, producer

Additional musicians

- The New Advent Choir directed by Yergan Jones
- String quartet arranged by Larry Baird:
  - Tirza Kosche, Jeanne Johnson-Watkins - violins
  - Cindy Beard - viola
  - Anna Joyner - cello

Production

- Steve Rawls - co-producer, engineer, mixing
- Michie Turpin - director
- Jeff Glixman - mixing
- Hank Willams, Jim Kaiser - mastering at MasterMix, Nashville, Tennessee
