= Sail On: The 30th Anniversary Collection =

Greatest hits album & DVD by Kansas
- Released: August 31, 2004
- Recorded: 1973–2002
- Genre: Progressive rock, hard rock
- Label: Sony
- Producer: Various

Kansas chronology
The Ultimate Kansas (2002)	Sail On: The 30th Anniversary Collection (2004)	Works in Progress (2006)

Sail On: The 30th Anniversary Collection is the fifth compilation from the band Kansas, originally released in 2004. Along with two CDs that include tracks from each one of the band's studio albums, the compilation also includes a 16-track companion DVD which features numerous television appearances, videos, and live recordings. The title Sail On comes from a lyric in the band's 1975 song "Icarus (Borne on Wings of Steel)", which is included in the collection.

Professional ratings
Review scores
Source	Rating
Allmusic	4/5 stars

== Track listing ==
All songs written by Kerry Livgren, except where noted.

=== CD one ===
1. "Can I Tell You" (Rich Williams, Phil Ehart, Dave Hope, Steve Walsh) – 3:33
2. "Journey from Mariabronn" (Livgren, Walsh) – 7:57
3. "Song for America" – 10:03
4. "Lamplight Symphony" – 8:15
5. "Icarus (Borne on Wings of Steel)" – 6:04
6. "The Pinnacle" – 9:36
7. "Child of Innocence" – 4:36
8. "Carry On Wayward Son" – 5:23
9. "Cheyenne Anthem" – 6:54
10. "Miracles Out of Nowhere" – 6:28
11. "What's on My Mind" – 3:28

=== CD two ===
1. "Point of Know Return" (Ehart, Robby Steinhardt, Walsh) – 3:13
2. "Portrait (He Knew)" (Livgren, Walsh) – 4:35
3. "Dust in the Wind" – 3:26
4. "Lightning's Hand" (Livgren, Walsh) – 4:23
5. "Sparks of the Tempest" (Livgren, Walsh) – 4:16
6. "Paradox" (Live) (Livgren, Walsh) – 4:09
7. "People of the South Wind" – 3:39
8. "Hold On" – 3:52
9. "Got to Rock On" (Walsh) – 3:22
10. "Play the Game Tonight" (Ehart, Danny Flower, Rob Frazier, Livgren, Williams) – 3:26
11. "Fight Fire with Fire" (Dino Elefante, John Elefante) – 3:41
12. "All I Wanted" (Steve Morse, Walsh) – 3:23
13. "Rainmaker" (Bob Ezrin, Morse, Walsh) – 6:47
14. "Desperate Times" (Walsh) – 5:26
15. "Eleanor Rigby" (John Lennon, Paul McCartney) – 3:23
16. "Icarus II " – 7:15

=== DVD ===
1. "Can I Tell You" (Don Kirshner's Rock Concert 1974)
2. "Journey from Mariabronn" (Don Kirshner's Rock Concert 1974)
3. "Death of Mother Nature Suite" (Don Kirshner's Rock Concert 1974)
4. "Icarus - Borne on Wings of Steel" (Don Kirshner's Rock Concert 1975)
5. "The Pinnacle" (Don Kirshner's Rock Concert 1975)
6. "Point of Know Return" (Video 1977)
7. "Dust in the Wind" (Video 1977)
8. "On the Other Side" (Video 1979)
9. "People of the South Wind" (Video 1979)
10. "Reason to Be" (Video 1979)
11. "Away from You" (Video 1979)
12. "Fight Fire With Fire" (Video 1983)
13. "All I Wanted" (Video 1986)
14. "The Preacher" (Live 2002, taken from Device – Voice – Drum)
15. "Miracles Out of Nowhere" (Live 2002, taken from Device – Voice – Drum)
16. "Carry On Wayward Son" (Live 2002, taken from Device – Voice – Drum)
17. "Distant Vision" (Live 2002, outtake from Device – Voice – Drum) (Hidden track/Easter egg)

The music videos for "Can't Cry Anymore", "Play the Game Tonight", "Windows", "Stand Beside Me", and "Everybody's My Friend" are not included on the DVD.

== Personnel ==
- Phil Ehart: drums
- John Elefante: keyboards, lead vocals on "Play the Game Tonight" and "Fight Fire With Fire"
- Dave Hope: bass guitar
- Kerry Livgren: guitars, keyboards
- Robby Steinhardt: violin, vocals
- Steve Walsh: keyboards, lead vocals
- Rich Williams: guitar
- Steve Morse: guitar, vocals
- Billy Greer: bass guitar, vocals
- David Ragsdale: violin on "Desperate Times"
- Bob Ezrin: percussion, vocals
