= The Wall (Kansas song) =

Song by Kansas

from the album Leftoverture
- Released: October 21, 1976
- Studio: Studio in the Country
- Genre: Progressive rock
- Length: 4:51
- Label: Kirshner
- Songwriters: Kerry Livgren, Steve Walsh
- Producers: Jeff Glixman, Kansas

"The Wall" is a song written by Kerry Livgren and Steve Walsh that was first released on Kansas' 1976 album Leftoverture. It was subsequently released on several of the band's live and compilation albums.

== Background ==
Music professor Mitchell Morris interprets "The Wall" and another song from Leftoverture, "Carry On Wayward Son", as examples of "turning the Romantic artist into a prophetic visionary who can be heard in terms of evangelical Protestantism.” He says that "The song spends its time exploring a state just before spiritual rebirth, though certain of that rebirth instead of constructing dramatizations of the process itself [as 'Carry On Wayward Son' does]." He says that in "The Wall" "a more communitarian vision [than in 'Carry On Wayward Son'] seems to be projected in both the lyrics and the music."

Music journalist Gary Graff described "The Wall" as a power ballad. "The Wall" consists of three verses. According to Morris, the first verse "[sets] the visionary problem", the second verse "[amplifies] the emotional state of the lyrical first person" and the last verse "[predicts] the satisfactory resolution." The song includes an instrumental intro, as well as instrumental sections between the last two verses and the end of the song. Morris describes the chord progressions and figuration and being neo-baroque, helping to convey its "grandiose inspiration."

== Reception ==
Daily Republican-Register critic Jim Marshall said in his contemporary review of Leftoverture that "The Wall" was "one of the best songs I have ever heard in my whole life." St. Louis Post-Dispatch critic John S. Cullinane said that "The Wall" is "the prettiest and the simplest" song on side 1 of Leftoverture and said that Walsh's lead vocal is "flawless."

Classic Rock History critic Brian Kachejian rated "The Wall" as Kansas' all-time best song. Ultimate Classic Rock critic Matt Wardlaw considered ""The Wall" to be a classic. Ultimate Classic Rock critic Eduardo Rivadavia rated "The Wall" as Kansas' sixth greatest song, saying it addresses the same theme that Pink Floyd addressed in their rock opera The Wall but accomplishes it in less than five minutes. Rivadavia also said of "The Wall" that it "exhibited the vast scope of the band's orchestral vision and melodic gifts like no other Kansas song before it." Chaospin critic Thomas Newman similar mentions that "Three years before Pink Floyd decided bricks and mortar deserved a metaphorical makeover, Kansas was doing the same," while noting that rather than needing an entire rock opera, Kansas was able to make their point in a song lasting less than 5 minutes. Newman rated "The Wall" as Kansas' 10th best song, praising its "vast vision and masterful execution." I Love Classic Rock rated "The Wall" as one of Kansas' 10 best love songs, describing it as a "harmonic power ballad" and a "five-minute upbeat, feel-good track."

Ronnie Platt, who became Kansas' lead singer in 2014, rated "The Wall" as one of his 10 favorite Kansas songs. Platt said "The guitar lead coming in immediately and then concluding the intro with harmony guitars, heartfelt lyrics, and a passionate, dramatic conclusion, has always been near the top of my list."

== Other appearances ==
"The Wall" has appeared on several Kansas compilation albums, including The Best of Kansas in 1984, Carry On in 1992, The Kansas Boxed Set in 1994 and The Ultimate Kansas in 2002. Live versions have appeared on Two for the Show in 1978, Live at the Whisky in 1992, King Biscuit Flower Hour Presents Kansas in 1998, the DVD Device – Voice – Drum in 2002 and the DVD version of There's Know Place Like Home in 2009. A live version recorded at the Tennessee Theatre in Knoxville, Tennessee on February 22, 2020 was released on Point of Know Return (Live & Beyond) in 2021.

Lana Lane covered "The Wall" on her 2003 album Covers Collection.
