= Always Never the Same =

Always Never the Same may refer to:

- Always Never the Same (Kansas album), 1998
- Always Never the Same (George Strait album), 1999
