= David Hope =

David Hope may refer to:

- David Hope, Baron Hope of Thornes, British former archbishop
- David Hope, Baron Hope of Craighead, Scottish judge and university chancellor
- Dave Hope, American bassist with veteran rock act, Kansas
