= Kansas (Kansas album) =

Studio album by Kansas
- Released: March 8, 1974
- Recorded: September & December 1973
- Studios: Record Plant Studios "A" and "C", New York City
- Genres: Progressive rock; boogie rock; hard rock
- Length: 45:05
- Labels: Kirshner (US); Epic (Europe)
- Producer: Wally Gold

Kansas chronology
Kansas (1974)	Song for America (1975)

Singles from Kansas
- 1. "Can I Tell You" Released: May 1974; 2. "Lonely Wind" Released: February 1975

Kansas is the debut studio album by American progressive rock band Kansas, released in 1974 by Kirshner in the United States and Epic Records in other countries.

Kansas's debut album followed the merging of two Topeka musical camps: Kerry Livgren, from a previous Kansas line-up, and White Clover, which played mainstream rock and blues. The newly formed group signed with Kirshner Records in 1973 and traveled to New York to record their first release.

The material on Kansas, written mostly by guitarist/keyboardist Livgren and vocalist/keyboardist Steve Walsh, had been culled from the repertoire of both groups. Livgren's songs were generally longer and more elaborate than Walsh's and featured mystical lyrics which reflected his intense interest in Eastern religions. "Journey from Mariabronn" was inspired by Hermann Hesse's Narcissus and Goldmund, while "Belexes" and "Apercu" were influenced by the pseudo-Asian sound of Giacomo Puccini's Turandot.

Kansas was promoted by print advertisements which included the tagline "Kansas is Koming." A promotional 7-inch single titled "Man the Stormcellars: Kansas is Koming!" was sent to radio stations and featured Don Kirshner hyping the album. Two 7-inch singles were released: "Can I Tell You" and "Lonely Wind". Both failed to chart, though a live version of "Lonely Wind" (from the double-live album Two for the Show) did reach the Top 100 in early 1979. Playlist: Bringing It Back featured five songs from this album and five from Masque. The album was reissued in remastered format on CD in 2004. A remastered version of the album appeared on vinyl in 2014.

== Artwork ==
The album cover depicts abolitionist John Brown in a scene from Tragic Prelude, a mural by Kansas native John Steuart Curry. The original mural is painted on a wall at the Kansas State Capitol in Topeka. The album cover image is severely discolored and cropped to show only a small part of the original painting.

== Reception ==
Professional ratings
Review scores
Source	Rating
AllMusic	3.5/5 stars
MusicHound Rock	2/5
ProgressiveWorld.net	5/5 stars
The Rolling Stone Album Guide	1/5 stars

In a contemporary review for New Musical Express, Max Bell wrote that, despite Kansas having all the elements for subtlety, "bristling with hard rock commonplace, speed and beat, they rapidly cancel any hints of originality", showing a lack of personality which transforms the listening of the album in a boring enterprise.

AllMusic's retrospective review gave the nod to the band's mix of progressive rock and boogie rock as being unique, but contended that it also makes them less interesting than other progressive rock bands. They also criticized their ambitiousness as being overdone: "there're a lot of scales and arpeggios, galloping triplets, dramatic organ, and stately ballads that signify nothing and go nowhere."

Tom Karr at ProgressiveWorld.net described the album as "an outstanding debut, a brilliant display of song writing and musicianship, and a great statement of Kansas's musical ethos." He felt that the song "Apercu" has "Kansas at their best, with frequent use of time and tempo changes, and well developed musical themes, showing a group of outstanding players and arrangers. The level of instrumental virtuosity displayed here is jaw dropping, and on either side of the Atlantic, there were few that could even hope to approach Kansas's mastery of their craft." He defined "Journey From Mariabronn" as "Kansas's first full-on symphonic rock masterpiece, and the song has so many strong elements and themes, it goes beyond any simple analysis. This song provides the paradigm for the great works of the future, and introduces the writing style that would produce the wonderful songs of Kansas's early discography."

Ranking on the Billboard album chart as high as #174, the Kansas album in the months subsequent to its release in the spring of 1974 sold over 135,000 units. The platinum success of Kansas' fourth and fifth album releases: Leftoverture (1976) and Point of Know Return (1977), revived commercial interest in the band's early output, it being reported in January 1978 that both the albums Kansas and Song for America had at that point each sold between 300,000 and 400,000 units, with the third Kansas album, Masque (1976), having been certified Gold for sales of 500,000 units the previous month. Both Kansas and Song for America would eventually be certified Gold for selling 500,000 units, Song for America as early as 1980 but Kansas not until 1995.

In 2026 the album earned the distinction of being named the most underrated classic rock album of all time by Collider.

== Track listing ==
Side one
No.	Title	Writer(s)	Lead vocals	Length
1.	"Can I Tell You"	Rich Williams, Steve Walsh, Phil Ehart, Dave Hope	Steinhardt and Walsh	3:32
2.	"Bringing It Back"	J. J. Cale	Steinhardt	3:33
3.	"Lonely Wind"	Walsh	Walsh	4:16
4.	"Belexes"	Kerry Livgren	Walsh	4:23
5.	"Journey from Mariabronn"	Livgren, Walsh	Walsh	7:55

Side two
No.	Title	Writer(s)	Lead vocals	Length
6.	"The Pilgrimage"	Livgren, Walsh	Steinhardt and Walsh	3:42
7.	"Aperçu"	Livgren, Walsh	Steinhardt and Walsh	9:54
8.	"Death of Mother Nature Suite"	Livgren	Steinhardt	7:43

Bonus track on 2004 CD reissue
No.	Title	Length
9.	"Bringing It Back" (Live at the Agora Ballroom, Cleveland, Ohio, 1975)	9:41

== Personnel ==
Kansas

- Steve Walsh – piano, organ, Fender Rhodes, congas, lead and backing vocals
- Kerry Livgren – guitars, piano, organ, Moog synthesizer, backing vocals
- Robby Steinhardt – violin, lead and backing vocals
- Rich Williams – electric and acoustic guitars
- Dave Hope – bass, backing vocals
- Phil Ehart – drums

Additional musicians

- Jay Siegel (from The Tokens) – vocals on "Lonely Wind"

Production

- Wally Gold – producer
- Dan Turbeville – engineer
- Kevin "Whip" Herron & Jimmy "Shoes" Iovine – assistant engineers
- Tom Rabstenek, Greg Calbi – mastering
- Ed Lee – cover design
- John Steuart Curry – cover painting
- Don Hunstein – back cover photo
- Jeff Glixman, Jeff Magid – remastered edition producers

== Charts ==
Chart (1974)	Peak position
US Billboard 200	174

== Certifications ==
Region	Certification	Certified units/sales
Canada (Music Canada)	Gold	50,000^{^}
United States (RIAA)	Gold	500,000^{^}
^{^} Shipments figures based on certification alone.
