= Audio-Visions =

Studio album by Kansas
- Released: September 1980
- Recorded: Late 1979/Early 1980
- Studios: Axis Studios, Atlanta, Georgia
- Genres: Hard rock; arena rock; progressive rock
- Length: 43:25
- Labels: Kirshner/CBS, Epic
- Producers: Kansas, Brad Aaron, Davey Moiré

Kansas chronology
Monolith (1979)	Audio-Visions (1980)	Vinyl Confessions (1982)

Singles from Audio-Visions
- 1. "Hold On" Released: September 1980 (US); 2. "Got to Rock On" Released: December 1980

Audio-Visions is the seventh studio album by American progressive rock band Kansas, released in 1980. The album was reissued in remastered format on CD in 1996 on Legacy/Epic and again in 2011, as a Japanese import vinyl-replica CD, as well as part of the Sony/Legacy domestic boxed set, Kansas Complete Album Collection 1974-1983, which packages all of the band's original releases on Kirshner and affiliated labels CBS/Columbia.

Kerry Livgren's recent conversion to Christianity is first heard on this album, primarily in the lyrics to "Hold On", which was written as an evangelistic plea to his wife. That song was the original lineup's last Top 40, peaking at No. 40 as the album's first single. The second single from the album, "Got to Rock On," charted outside the Top 40, and was released as a promo only 12" single as well, featuring a live version of the song on Side B of the promotional single, taken from an ABC Radio "the Source" live concert broadcast from Chicago. In addition, another stop on the Audio-Visions tour was broadcast on the radio show "A Night on the Road", from the Palladium in New York City. In addition to playing almost every song on the album on the tour, the band also played one selection each from Livgren and Walsh's recent solo albums. While every song from the album Monolith was played during the early part of the Monolith tour in 1979, not a single song from Monolith was played on the Audio-Visions tour.

The eighth song on this album, "No One Together", was originally intended for release on the previous album, Monolith, but it was dropped from that album due to an argument between Walsh and Livgren over whose song should be included there (with Walsh winning out the argument by having his song, "How My Soul Cries Out for You", included) and wound up on this album instead.

The album was to be the last album with the band's original lineup until 2000's Somewhere to Elsewhere, and coincidentally the band's latest studio album to be certified gold by the RIAA (which it did in December 1980).

In 2018, Friday Music released a 180-gram "blue-splatter" translucent vinyl remaster of the album, featuring a gatefold cover with the original sleeve artwork, and an insert in the first sleeve of a foldout poster of the album cover.

== Reception ==
Professional ratings
Review scores
Source	Rating
AllMusic	3/5 stars
The Rolling Stone Album Guide	1/5 stars

Rolling Stone gave a resoundingly negative review of the album, calling it "the musically overwrought and lyrically fatuous product of a collective hubris gone haywire," and mockingly referring to Kerry Livgren as "Kerry Liver." They contended that Kansas had lost all direction, with "Hold On" being the only track not lost in misdirected ambitions. AllMusic's William Ruhlmann retrospectively remarked how "nothing here matched the music from the group's late-'70s heyday", probably due to the two main songwriters being distracted by their solo careers with Kansas "becoming a part-time occupation".

Record World said the single "Got to Rock On" has "a thunderous, driving beat and dynamic tempo shifts."

== Track listing ==
Side one
No.	Title	Writer(s)	Lead Vocals	Length
1.	"Relentless"	Kerry Livgren	Walsh	4:56
2.	"Anything for You"	Steve Walsh	Walsh	3:58
3.	"Hold On"	Livgren	Walsh	3:53
4.	"Loner"	Walsh	Walsh	2:30
5.	"Curtain of Iron"	Livgren	Walsh and Steinhardt	6:12

Side two
No.	Title	Writer(s)	Lead Vocals	Length
6.	"Got to Rock On"	Walsh	Walsh	3:21
7.	"Don't Open Your Eyes"	Walsh, Rich Williams, Livgren, Phil Ehart, Dave Hope	Walsh and Steinhardt	4:05
8.	"No One Together"	Livgren	Walsh and Steinhardt	6:58
9.	"No Room for a Stranger"	Williams, Walsh	Walsh	3:00
10.	"Back Door"	Walsh	Walsh and Steinhardt	4:23

== Credits ==
Kansas

- Steve Walsh – keyboards, vibraphone, percussion, lead and backing vocals
- Kerry Livgren – guitars, keyboards, percussion, backing vocals
- Robby Steinhardt – violin, viola, lead and backing vocals
- Rich Williams – guitar, percussion, backing vocals
- Dave Hope – bass guitar, backing vocals
- Phil Ehart – drums, percussion, backing vocals

Additional personnel

- Donna Williams – additional voice and sounds
- Joey Jelf – additional voice and sounds
- Lisa White – additional voice and sounds
- Victoria Livgren – additional voice and sounds
- Terry Ehart – additional voice and sounds
- The Four Bassmen – additional voice and sounds

Production

- Kansas – producers, cover concept
- Brad Aaron, Davey Moiré – co-producers, engineers
- Greg Webster – assistant engineer
- George Marino – mastering at Sterling Sound, New York
- Tom Drennon – art direction, design, illustrations
- Peter Lloyd – cover painting
- Bob Irwin – reissue producer
- Vic Anesini – digital remastering
- Frank Tozour – Sony digital editing

== Charts ==
Chart (1980)	Peak position
Canada Top Albums/CDs (RPM)	96
Swedish Albums (Sverigetopplistan)	35
US Billboard 200	26

== Certifications ==
Region	Certification	Certified units/sales
United States (RIAA)	Gold	500,000^{^}
^{^} Shipments figures based on certification alone.
