= Point of Know Return =

1977 studio album by Kansas

Studio album by Kansas
- Released: October 1977
- Recorded: June – July 1977
- Studios: Studio in the Country (Bogalusa, Louisiana); Woodland (Nashville, Tennessee)
- Genres: Progressive rock; hard rock; progressive pop
- Length: 44:28
- Labels: Kirshner/CBS; Kirshner/Epic
- Producer: Jeff Glixman

Kansas chronology
Leftoverture (1976)	Point of Know Return (1977)	Two for the Show (1978)

Singles from Point of Know Return
- 1. "Point of Know Return" Released: October 1977; 2. "Dust in the Wind" Released: January 1978; 3. "Portrait (He Knew)" Released: May 1978

Point of Know Return is the fifth studio album by American rock band Kansas, released in 1977. The album was reissued in remastered format on CD in 2002. It was certified 4× platinum by the Recording Industry Association of America (RIAA) in May 1995.

== Composition and recording ==
The recording sessions for Point of Know Return commenced in June 1977 at Studio in the Country, the Bogalusa, Louisiana facility where Kansas' previous two albums were recorded. Due to the band encountering equipment failure at Studio in the Country, Kansas shifted recording sites, the majority of the recording of Point of Know Return being done at Woodland Sound Studios in Nashville over the month of July.

Singer/songwriter Steve Walsh left the group briefly during the recording of this album. In an interview on the weekly In the Studio with Redbeard radio show, he would admit that, at this point, he had been something of a prima donna and was attracted by the chance of a solo career.

"Dust in the Wind" is known for its sparse acoustic nature. The guitar line for the song was written by Kerry Livgren as a finger exercise for learning fingerpicking. His wife, Vicci, heard what he was doing, remarked that the melody was nice, and encouraged him to write lyrics for it. Livgren was unsure whether his fellow band members would like it since it was a departure from their signature style. However, he did offer it to them, and the song was accepted and then recorded.

The album is critically acclaimed for the singles "Point of Know Return," which was a late addition to the album, and "Portrait (He Knew)," which was written about Albert Einstein. In 1988, Livgren released an updated version of "Portrait (He Knew)" titled "Portrait II" as part of the album Prime Mover credited to his band AD. He changed the subject of the song from Einstein to Jesus Christ. Another song, "Closet Chronicles", is a Howard Hughes allegory.

== Reception ==
Professional ratings
Review scores
Source	Rating
AllMusic	4/5 stars
MusicHound Rock	3/5 stars
The Rolling Stone Album Guide	2/5 stars

In Rolling Stone, John Swenson (who sometimes gave fan favorites one or two star reviews) gave the album a mixed review, saying that though the transition to shorter songs generally works, the lyrics are "a wan and ridiculous rehash of the bargain-basement exoticism employed by the British art-rock crowd." Swenson may have softened his criticism a bit, when he wrote that though Kansas lacks a "virtuoso soloist," the band's ensemble playing is strong and purposeful.

In contrast, Robert Taylor of AllMusic wrote that Kansas' "interplay and superior musicianship make this both an essential classic rock and progressive rock recording", despite its "dated sound" and the band's struggle "to maintain a healthy balance of progression combined with pop."

Point of Know Return would be Kansas' highest-charting album in the US, peaking at No. 4 in January 1978, and would sell four million copies in the US and be certified Quadruple Platinum by the RIAA.

== Track listing ==
Side one
No.	Title	Writer(s)	Length
1.	"Point of Know Return"	Walsh, Phil Ehart, Robby Steinhardt	3:13
2.	"Paradox"	Kerry Livgren, Walsh	3:50
3.	"The Spider" (instrumental)	Walsh	2:05
4.	"Portrait (He Knew)"	Livgren, Walsh	4:38
5.	"Closet Chronicles"	Walsh, Livgren	6:31

Side two
No.	Title	Writer(s)	Length
6.	"Lightning's Hand"	Walsh, Livgren	4:24
7.	"Dust in the Wind"	Livgren	3:28
8.	"Sparks of the Tempest"	Livgren, Walsh	4:18
9.	"Nobody's Home"	Livgren, Walsh	4:40
10.	"Hopelessly Human"	Livgren	7:17

Bonus tracks on 2002 CD reissue
No.	Title	Length
11.	"Sparks of the Tempest" (Recorded live at Merriweather Post Pavilion, Maryland)	5:17
12.	"Portrait (He Knew)" (Remix)	4:50

The remix of "Portrait (He Knew)" in the 2002 remastered edition marks the third time the song has been remixed. A remix appeared on the original single. A different remix appeared on the bonus disc of a Europe-only collection from the late 1990s.

== Personnel ==
Kansas

- Steve Walsh – organ, synthesizers, vibraphone, piano, lead vocals (except on "Lightning's Hand"), backing vocals, additional percussion
- Kerry Livgren – synthesizers, piano, clavinet, electric and acoustic guitars, additional percussion
- Robby Steinhardt – violins, viola, backing vocals, lead vocals on "Closet Chronicles", "Lightning's Hand", "Sparks of the Tempest", and "Hopelessly Human"
- Rich Williams – electric and acoustic guitars
- Dave Hope – bass
- Phil Ehart – drums, timpani, chimes, additional percussion

In addition to the actual credits, the album's liner notes credit each band member with a fictional instrument, such as "chain-driven gong", "autogyro", "Rinaldo whistling machine", and "Peabody chromatic inverter".

Production

- Jeff Glixman – producer, engineer, mixing at Village Recorders, Los Angeles, August 1977, remastered edition producer
- Terry Diane Becker – additional engineering
- George Marino – mastering at Sterling Sound, New York, September 1977
- Kansas – arrangements and cover art concept
- Tom Drennon – art director
- Peter Lloyd – cover painting
- Rod Dyer – inner sleeve design
- Bob Maile – calligraphy
- Jeff Magid – remastered edition producer

== Charts ==
=== Weekly charts ===
Chart (1977–1978)	Peak position
Australian Albums (Kent Music Report)	52
Canada Top Albums/CDs (RPM)	7
Dutch Albums (Album Top 100)	33
French Albums (SNEP)	16
US Billboard 200	4

=== Year-end charts ===
Chart (1977)	Position
Canada Top Albums/CDs (RPM)	59
Chart (1978)	Position
Canada Top Albums/CDs (RPM)	10
US Billboard 200	9

== Certifications ==
Region	Certification	Certified units/sales
Canada (Music Canada)	Platinum	100,000^{^}
United States (RIAA)	4× Platinum	4,000,000^{^}
^{^} Shipments figures based on certification alone.
