= Leftoverture =

Studio album by Kansas
- Released: October 21, 1976
- Recorded: December 1975 – August 1976
- Studios: Studio in the Country, Bogalusa, Louisiana
- Genre: Progressive rock
- Length: 43:55
- Labels: Kirshner (US); Epic (Europe and Japan); CBS (Oceania)
- Producers: Jeff Glixman, Kansas

Kansas chronology
Masque (1975)	Leftoverture (1976)	Point of Know Return (1977)

Singles from Leftoverture
- 1. "Carry On Wayward Son" Released: November 19, 1976; 2. "What's on My Mind" Released: May 1977

Leftoverture is the fourth studio album by American rock band Kansas, released in 1976. The album was reissued in remastered format on CD in 2001. It was the band's first album to be certified by the Recording Industry Association of America (RIAA), and remains their highest selling album, having been certified 4× platinum in the United States.

== Background ==
Steve Walsh began to experience writer's block prior to the recording, and his contribution to the album would ultimately be limited to co-authoring three songs; it fell on Kerry Livgren to fill the void. The new compositions retained much of the classically inspired complexity of Livgren's previous work. As with their previous album, Masque, Kansas recorded Leftoverture at Studio in the Country in Bogalusa, Louisiana. The Studio in the Country was so named because, as Livgren described on In the Studio with Redbeard radio show in the episode spotlighting Leftoverture, "it was in the middle of a swamp. We'd walk out of the studio and there would be gators in front of the studio, mosquitos the size of B-52s and at times armadillos would run into the control room."

Leftoverture opens with the song "Carry On Wayward Son", which Livgren wrote as a sequel to "The Pinnacle", the final song from the previous album Masque (1975).

The album's title, Leftoverture, is a portmanteau of leftover and overture.

== Reception ==
Professional ratings
Review scores
Source	Rating
AllMusic	3.5/5 stars
Christgau's Record Guide	D+
MusicHound Rock	4/5
The Rolling Stone Album Guide	2/5 stars

The album was met with mixed reviews. Rolling Stone called Leftoverture Kansas's best album to date, and said that it "warrants Kansas a spot right alongside Boston and Styx as one of the fresh new American bands who combine hard-driving group instrumentation (with a dearth of flashy solos) with short, tight melody lines and pleasant singing." The magazine Playboy reviewed the album as "extremely strong" and lauded Kansas for representing "the solid, Midwestern values of our vast musical heartland." In contrast, Robert Christgau said the album lacked the intelligence and conviction of European progressive rock, and that the self-deprecating humor implied in the song and album titles is completely absent from the record itself.

More recently, AllMusic's Stephen Thomas Erlewine wrote that the album contains "neither hooks nor true grandiosity to make it interesting" and, despite the great single "Carry On Wayward Son", the fact that Kansas "never manage to rival it anywhere on this record is as much a testament to their crippling ambition as their lack of skills." Gary Graff was more enthusiastic, finding Leftoverture to be "Kansas' breakthrough album and a thorough representation of its assorted musical sensibilities." Ultimate Classic Rock critic Matt Wardlaw considered "Carry On Wayward Son", "Magnum Opus", "The Wall", "What's on My Mind" and "Opus Insert" to be classics. Ultimate Classic Rock critic Eduardo Rivadavia rated "Carry On Wayward Son" as Kansas' greatest song and "The Wall" as Kansas' sixth greatest song.

Classic Rock History critic Brian Kachejian rated "The Wall" as Kansas' all-time best song, as well as rating "Carry On Wayward Son" number 2 and "Miracles Out of Nowhere" number 5. Classic Rock critic Dave Ling also ranked three songs from Leftoverture among Kansas' 10 best – "Magnum Opus", "Miracles Out of Nowhere" and "Carry On Wayward Son".

Ronnie Platt, who became Kansas' lead singer in 2014, rated three songs from Leftoverture as being among his 10 favorite Kansas songs – "Carry On Wayward Son", "The Wall" and "Miracles Out of Nowhere".

== Track listing ==
All tracks are written by Kerry Livgren except where noted.

Side one
No.	Title	Writer(s)	Length
1.	"Carry On Wayward Son"		5:23
2.	"The Wall"	Livgren, Steve Walsh	4:51
3.	"What's on My Mind"		3:28
4.	"Miracles out of Nowhere"		6:28

Side two
No.	Title	Writer(s)	Length
5.	"Opus Insert"		4:30
6.	"Questions of My Childhood"	Walsh, Livgren	3:40
7.	"Cheyenne Anthem"		6:55
8.	"Magnum Opus": a. "Father Padilla Meets the Perfect Gnat"; b. "Howling at the Moon"; c. "Man Overboard"; d. "Industry on Parade"; e. "Release the Beavers"; f. "Gnat Attack"	Livgren, Walsh, Rich Williams, Dave Hope, Phil Ehart, Robby Steinhardt	8:25

Bonus tracks on 2001 CD reissue
No.	Title	Length
9.	"Carry On Wayward Son" (live at Pine Knob Music Theatre, Clarkston, Michigan, July 1978)	4:43
10.	"Cheyenne Anthem" (live at The Palladium in New York City, December 1977)	6:41

== Personnel ==
Kansas

- Steve Walsh – organ, piano, additional synthesizers, vibraphone, lead and backing vocals, congas.
- Kerry Livgren – electric guitar, piano, clavinet, Moog, Oberheim and ARP synthesizers
- Robby Steinhardt – violin, viola, lead vocals on "Miracles Out of Nowhere" and "Cheyenne Anthem", backing vocals
- Rich Williams – electric and acoustic guitars
- Dave Hope – bass guitar
- Phil Ehart – drums, percussion

Additional personnel

- Toye LaRocca, Cheryl Norman – children's voices on "Cheyenne Anthem"

Production

- Jeff Glixman – producer, assistant engineer, remastered edition producer
- Bill Evans – engineer
- Edwin Hobgood, Ray Black – additional studio assistance
- George Marino – mastering at Sterling Sound, New York City, New York
- Jeff Magid – remastered edition producer
- Dave McMacken - graphic design

== Charts ==
=== Weekly charts ===
Chart (1977)	Peak position
Australian Albums (Kent Music Report)	68
Canada Top Albums/CDs (RPM)	2
US Billboard 200	5

=== Year-end charts ===
Chart (1977)	Position
Canada Top Albums/CDs (RPM)	25
US Billboard 200	17

== Certifications ==
Region	Certification	Certified units/sales
Canada (Music Canada)	Platinum	100,000^{^}
New Zealand (RMNZ)	Gold	7,500^{‡}
United States (RIAA)	4× Platinum	4,000,000^{^}
^{^} Shipments figures based on certification alone.^{‡} Sales+streaming figures based on certification alone.
