= Kerry Livgren =

American guitarist (born 1949)

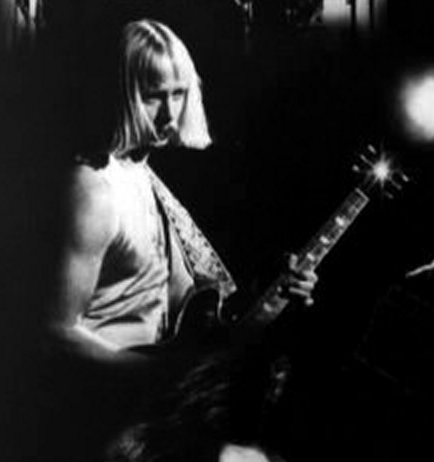
- Livgren in a 1976 promotional photo for Kansas

Background information
- Born: Kerry Allen Livgren; September 18, 1949 (age 77); Topeka, Kansas, U.S.
- Genres: Progressive rock, rock
- Occupations: Musician, songwriter
- Instruments: Guitar, keyboards
- Years active: 1974–present
- Website: numavox.com

Kerry Allen Livgren (born September 18, 1949) is an American musician, best known as one of the founding members and primary songwriters for the American rock band Kansas.

Livgren, raised in Topeka, Kansas, developed an early interest in music and songwriting. Throughout the 1960s and 1970s, he played in various bands, exploring spiritual themes in his lyrics. Livgren formed bands such as the Gimlets, Saratoga, and eventually Kansas. With Kansas, he achieved commercial success, writing hit songs like "Carry On Wayward Son" and "Dust in the Wind". In 1979, Livgren converted to evangelical Christianity, which influenced his subsequent work. He continued to work with Kansas, formed a new band called AD, and pursued a solo career. Livgren later formed a band called Proto-Kaw, which released new material until 2011. As the primary songwriter for Kansas, Livgren contributed to the band's worldwide success, with numerous Gold and multi-Platinum albums and over 14 million recordings sold.

== Biography ==
Livgren was raised in Topeka, Kansas, by his father Allen Leroy, an industrial engineer, and his mother Betty (née McElhiney). He was drawn to music at a young age, and his first musical interests developed with classical and jazz influences. His first equipment included an electric guitar he built using a cheap Stella guitar, a Sears amplifier and a low-quality Astatic microphone. Along with learning guitar, Livgren also focused on learning to write songs due to his desire for more creative expression and originality. He attended Washburn University for some time.

=== Early years: 1960s–1973 ===
Livgren was a member of numerous bands in the late 1960s and early 1970s and developed a reputation for complex compositions and poetic lyrics that explored spiritual themes. His investigations into various religions are reflected in the lyrics of his songs on Kansas' first six albums.

Livgren formed his first band, the Gimlets, with several close friends in high school, including John Pribble, drums, Scott Kessler, bass, Tim Strauss, guitar, and Dan Wright on keyboards. They soon found themselves booked after school and on weekends throughout Kansas and neighboring Missouri, where they played their original compositions, a blend of pop, English and psychedelic rock. After graduating from Topeka West High School in 1967, Livgren continued to perform with the Gimlets while at Washburn University. He then joined a predominantly black mainstream rhythm-and-blues band named the Mellotones, in which he met keyboard player Don Montre in 1969.

Forming a friendship, Livgren and Montre decided to leave the Mellotones and join the more commercially viable band the Reasons Why, which included Lynn Meredith and Wright. Though this band was doing well financially, Livgren became frustrated because of his desire for more creative expression, and he and Montre decided to start their own band. They briefly re-formed the Gimlets with former members Scott Kessler and Wright along with several new members. A short time later, they renamed the band Saratoga, after the name on the pencil that Livgren was using to write songs. Saratoga included Meredith, Montre, Wright, Livgren, Phil Ehart and Dave Hope.

In 1970, Livgren and Ehart decided to form a new group by combining the best members from Saratoga and Phil's band White Clover (which included Steve Walsh, Rich Williams, Hope and Jeff Glixman). While Livgren and Ehart were discussing what to call the new band, Hope walked in on the conversation and suggested they call themselves Kansas. This version of Kansas (referred to as "Kansas I" by fans) was known for its complex musical arrangements and originality, but the lineup lasted for only one year.

In 1971, Ehart and Hope left the group, and Livgren reworked the band and continued it under the name Kansas. (This group later became known by fans as Kansas II and is the lineup that re-formed decades later as Proto-Kaw). Kansas II continued to perform Livgren's original works, which fused experimental rock with psychedelia and jazz. During this time, Kansas II recorded a demo cassette that was released commercially 30 years later. Kansas II generated a loyal fan following, and the built-in audience helped the band secure concert bookings. However, financial problems plagued the band, and after a record deal with Jefferson Airplane's label failed to materialize and an old school bus broke down while the band was on the road touring, the band dissolved in 1973.

Shortly afterward, Livgren was invited by Ehart to join the re-formed White Clover, which also included vocalist Walsh, violinist Robby Steinhardt, bassist Hope, guitarist Williams and Ehart on drums. Before Livgren joined the band, White Clover had sent out a five-song demo tape, which Don Kirshner was interested in for his new label. As part of the effort to sign with Kirshner, the players soon renamed themselves Kansas, becoming the third, and eventually the best-known, lineup to use the name.

=== Commercial success with Kansas: 1974–1983 ===
After three albums in two years failed to provide them with a hit single, Kansas was under pressure from Kirshner and CBS records to write a hit. Livgren and the band realized it was their last chance. Because Walsh was experiencing writer's block, Livgren wrote or co-wrote all the songs for the group's fourth album, Leftoverture. On the last day of rehearsal for the new album, Livgren brought the band one more song, which they performed once before heading to the studio. The song, "Carry On Wayward Son", became Kansas' first hit, reaching No. 11.

Riding the success of Leftoverture, Livgren wrote "Dust in the Wind" for the Point of Know Return album. Like "Carry On Wayward Son", "Dust in the Wind" was added to the album at the last minute. Livgren said the song was an acoustic guitar warmup. While playing it one day at home when his wife was doing laundry, she told him he should put it on the album. Since the album at that point had extra time available, he presented the song to the band and it was included. It became their highest-charting single, reaching No. 6.

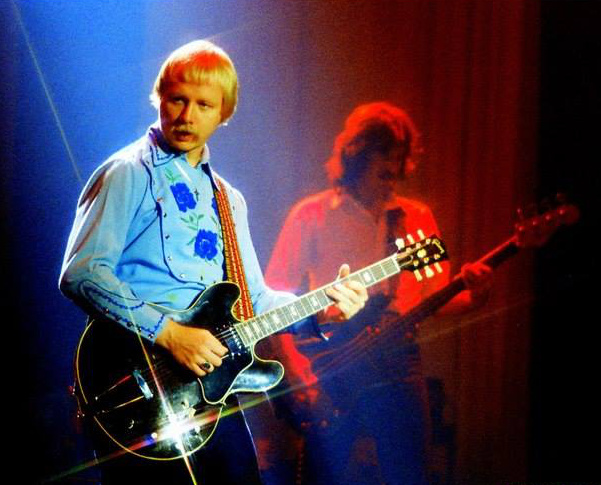
Livgren performing in Memphis, Tennessee, during the 1980 Kansas Monolith tour

In early 1979, Livgren became interested in The Urantia Book, a series of papers that claim to be a revelation authored by supernatural beings. Its influence can be felt in the lyrics of Kansas' 1979 album Monolith. Livgren subsequently rejected Urantia doctrine, and while on tour with the band in support of Monolith, he converted to Christianity. This was a result of a series of debates in the back of the tour bus with Jeff Pollard of Louisiana's Le Roux, the opening act for Kansas during the tour. The discussions between Livgren and Pollard concerned whether the Bible or the Urantia Book was the accurate record of the life of Jesus Christ. Because of the debates, Livgren became convinced that the Bible was the genuine record of Christ and that he had been mistaken in following the teachings of the Urantia Book. After a private hotel-room conversion experience, he became an evangelical Christian.

In 1980, Livgren released his first solo album, Seeds of Change. The album features several members of Kansas, along with Ambrosia singer David Pack and noted heavy-metal singer Ronnie James Dio, who sang on the tracks "To Live for the King" and "Mask of the Great Deceiver".

Livgren recorded three more albums with Kansas. However, tension was growing among the band members as a result of the increasingly Christian perspective of his lyrics. Walsh left the band near the end of 1981 as a result. Steinhardt also left, for personal reasons, prior to recording of the band's 1983 Drastic Measures album. Meanwhile, Livgren had also become increasingly dissatisfied with the band's musical direction (at least in part due to his newfound faith), and he would leave the band himself shortly after Drastic Measures was released.

Livgren has continued to appear occasionally with Kansas on various tours since the 1990s and contributed new songs to The Kansas Boxed Set in 1994 ("Wheels") and to Freaks of Nature in 1995 ("Cold Grey Morning"). In 2000, the original and current members of Kansas reunited at Livgren's studio to record a new album written entirely by Livgren, titled Somewhere to Elsewhere. Though the album received very favorable reviews, sales were not comparable to Kansas' past successes decades earlier.

=== AD : 1983–1988 ===
In 1983, after his departure from Kansas, Livgren recorded his second self-produced album for CBS, Time Line with Hope, Warren Ham, Michael Gleason and drummer Dennis Holt. By the end of the recording sessions, the session musicians had jelled, and he decided to name the group AD.

Due to legal entanglements caused by his contractual obligations with Kansas, Livgren was unable to market AD in the mainstream secular market. After negotiating with the record label, he received a waiver to perform with AD in the Christian rock market. Unfortunately, this would become a hindrance to commercial viability for the band. AD toured extensively between 1983 and 1986, sometimes playing bars and clubs one night and then churches the next. Livgren has stated on several occasions that he experienced some of the highest and lowest points in his career during his time with AD. Livgren mentions in his book Seeds of Change: The Spiritual Quest of Kerry Livgren that his time playing live with AD was his best as a guitarist.

AD released Art of the State in 1985. Due to financial difficulties, AD faded away in 1986 after releasing the album Reconstructions, though no official breakup was announced. In 1988, Livgren released a collection of previously unreleased AD songs titled Prime Mover. Livgren played all instruments, and all vocals were performed by Ham.

In 1997, Livgren rediscovered recordings of two AD performances from 1984 and 1985 that had been recorded by the soundboard engineer. Though they had not been made for release, Livgren remastered them and released them as a "thank you" to fans on a CD-R title called AD Live. The performances include mistakes and technical problems left intact and is meant as an archival release.

=== Solo years: 1989–2000 ===
In 1989, Livgren released his first all-instrumental album, One of Several Possible Musiks. He played all instruments on the album, which combines orchestral, jazz and rock styles. This effort won Livgren his first Dove Award, for Instrumental Album of the Year.

Livgren then released a double-CD retrospective, titled Decade, celebrating 10 years since his first solo recording. It included Livgren's first two albums, Seeds of Change and Time Line, in their entirety, plus tracks from other albums and previously unreleased songs. Enthusiasts of Livgren's music continue to hold this album in high regard, making it very hard to find.

In 1994, after moving back to Topeka, Livgren created GrandyZine production company and Numavox Records. He converted a restored barn on his farm into a state-of-the-art recording and production facility.

In 1995, Livgren released his next solo album, When Things Get Electric, on his new label. In 1996, he released his first soundtrack, for Sony's fourth Mind's Eye computer animation feature, titled Odyssey into the Mind's Eye. In 1998, Livgren mostly re-recorded the album Prime Mover and added five new songs and a new version of "Fair Exchange" from the Kansas album Vinyl Confessions to the reissue, Prime Mover II. (He reworked and reissued the album again in 2008 as Prime Mover (Redux).)

In 2000, Livgren released Collector's Sedition, featuring several vocalists, including his nephew, Jake Livgren. At this time, Livgren was writing new songs prolifically and realized that some of them "sounded like Kansas." He called Phil Ehart and offered him the opportunity to hear the songs. This led to a reunion album with Kansas, titled Somewhere to Elsewhere, which featured the then-touring version of Kansas along with Livgren and Dave Hope, the original bassist. The album was recorded at Livgren's Grandyzine Studio in his converted barn, where he performed on the album as lead guitarist and keyboardist and produced the album. It was the first Kansas album for which Livgren had written all the songs.

Shortly after the release of Somewhere to Elsewhere, Livgren began work on The Best of Kerry Livgren. Both retrospective and forward-looking, it contains tracks from all his solo releases and some AD tracks. The album also includes two new songs and new recordings of four older songs. Each of these new versions features the original vocalists, including Ham, Gleason and Dio.

=== Proto-Kaw: 2003–2011 ===
In 2003, Cuneiform Records issued a collection of material recorded by Kansas II, the early lineup that had included Livgren, Meredith, Wright, Montre, John Bolton, Rod Mikinski and Brad Schulz, calling the group Proto-Kaw. The band then re-formed under that name and released Before Became After in 2004 on Inside Out Records.

They released their second studio album, The Wait of Glory, on January 31, 2006, also on Inside Out Records. Unlike Before Became After, this work was composed of entirely new material written by Livgren. The package included a live concert DVD of Proto-Kaw's appearance at the 2005 NEARfest.

In late 2010, Livgren announced that the members of Proto-Kaw had decided to finish working on the band's fourth CD. Although he had suffered a stroke and was unable to play guitar or keyboard, Livgren worked with other band members to finish the project. On August 6, 2011, the band had a CD release party in Kansas City for the album, titled Forth.

== Influence and recognition ==
As primary songwriter, lead guitarist and keyboard player for Kansas, having penned such hits as "Carry On Wayward Son" and "Dust in the Wind", Livgren propelled the band to worldwide success and critical acclaim, with numerous Gold and multi-Platinum albums and more than 14 million recordings sold to date. Kansas produced eight Gold albums, one Platinum album, two quadruple-Platinum albums, one Platinum live album, and a 1 million-selling Gold single, "Dust in the Wind", according to the Kansas State Historical Society.

Kerry Livgren is listed as a "Famous Kansan" by the Kansas State Historical Society. The Platinum record awarded to him for the Kansas album Monolith hangs in the Kansas Museum of History. He was also honored by the Kansas State Legislature with a commendation on April 28, 2006.

== Guest appearances ==
Livgren's keyboard and guitar playing can be heard on the 2nd Chapter of Acts albums Rejoice (1981), Singer Sower (1983) and Night Light (1985). He also played on the Robin Crow album Electric Cinema (1992) and contributed a guitar solo to "Long Story", a song on Neal Morse's album Testimony (2003). In addition, Livgren recorded a guitar solo on the song "Rockstar Now" on the Crunchy album Loserville (2007).

On his website, Livgren reported in July 2009 that he had recently contributed to the new album by former Kansas bandmate John Elefante. Revolution of Mind by John Elefante and Mastedon was released in 2010, crediting Livgren as one of several guest guitarists.

== Book ==
In 1983, Livgren published his autobiography, Seeds of Change: The Spiritual Quest of Kerry Livgren, co-written with Kenneth Boa. A revised and expanded edition was released in 1991 that updated the book to cover his time with AD. In 2022, the book was revised and updated once more with a fresh new look and layout as well as additional photos that had not appeared in previous versions. A new preface and short "epilogue" chapter was also added to bridge the gap from the early 1990s to present day.

== Personal life ==
On September 1, 2009, Livgren had a stroke early in the day. His condition was reported as "serious but stable". By September 4, family members called his condition "positive" and said his progress in recovering was "encouraging". Livgren underwent surgery and received two stents in his carotid arteries. The area of his brain where the stroke-causing clot formed deals with language and other high-end skills. Livgren's family says his face did not have the "sagging" often found in stroke victims and he recognized family members squeezing their hands in recognition. The family established the Kansas band website as the only authorized source for information on Livgren's recovery. Livgren has now recovered partially and has resumed work on his various musical projects.

He made his first post-stroke appearance with Kansas on January 28, 2011 when he conducted the Kansas State University Symphony Orchestra for "Dust in the Wind" during a special concert celebrating the 150th anniversary of the state of Kansas. Livgren was greeted with a prolonged standing ovation.

== Discography ==
=== With Kansas ===
- 1974 Kansas
- 1975 Song for America
- 1975 Masque
- 1976 Leftoverture
- 1977 Point of Know Return
- 1978 Two for the Show live
- 1979 Monolith
- 1980 Audio-Visions
- 1982 Vinyl Confessions
- 1983 Drastic Measures
- 1992 Live at the Whisky live (guest appearance only)
- 2000 Somewhere to Elsewhere
- 2009 There's Know Place Like Home live (guest appearance only)

Compilations

- 1984 The Best of Kansas
- 1992 Carry On
- 1994 The Kansas Boxed Set
- 1999 The Best of Kansas [expanded]
- 2002 The Ultimate Kansas
- 2004 Sail On: The 30th Anniversary Collection (2CD/1DVD)
- 2005 On the Other Side re-release of Carry On

=== Solo, AD, Proto-Kaw ===
- 1980 Seeds of Change
- 1984 Time Line (Kerry Livgren/AD)
- 1985 Art of the State (AD)
- 1986 Reconstructions (AD)
- 1988 Prime Mover (Kerry Livgren/AD)
- 1989 One of Several Possible Musiks
- 1994 When Things Get Electric (Kerry Livgren and Corps de Pneuma) (remastered in 2005)
- 1997 Odyssey into the Mind's Eye soundtrack (remastered in 2005)
- 2000 Collector's Sedition (Review)
- 2002 Early Recordings from Kansas 1971–1973 (Proto-Kaw)
- 2004 Before Became After (Proto-Kaw)
- 2006 The Wait of Glory (Proto-Kaw)
- 2011 Forth (Proto-Kaw)
- 2021 The Resurrection Of Lazarus: A Cantata (Numavox Records)
- 2022 Q.A.R. (Numavox Records)

Live and compilations

- 1998 AD Live (AD) (Review)
- 1988 Compact Favorites (AD)
- 1992 Decade
- 2002 Best of Kerry Livgren

Reissues

- 1997 Reconstructions Reconstructed, reissue of Reconstructions, partly re-recorded (remastered, repackaged in 2006)
- 1998 Prime Mover II, reissue of Prime Mover, partly re-recorded, with additional tracks (Review)
- 2007 Collector's Sedition (Director's Cut), reissue of Collector's Sedition, partly re-recorded, remixed and remastered
- 2007 Decade Vol. II, reissue of Time Line (previously reissued on Decade disc 2), two tracks remixed
- 2008 Prime Mover (Redux), reissue of Prime Mover II, further re-recorded
- 2009 Decade Vol. I, reissue of Seeds of Change (previously reissued on Decade disc 1), partly re-recorded
- 2014 Before Became After, partly re-recorded, remixed and remastered
- 2015 The Wait of Glory, partly re-recorded, remixed and remastered
- 2016 Forth, partly re-recorded, remixed and remastered
- 2017 Several More Musiks, reissue of One of Several Possible Musiks, partly re-recorded, remixed and remastered, with additional tracks

=== Books ===
- 1980 Seeds of Change: The Spiritual Quest of Kerry Livgren, with Kenneth Boa; revised and expanded edition released in 1991, ISBN 0917143035

== Bibliography ==
- Contemporary Authors Online. Detroit: Gale. 2007. ISBN 978-0-7876-3995-2.
