= Dave Hope =

American bass guitarist (born 1949)

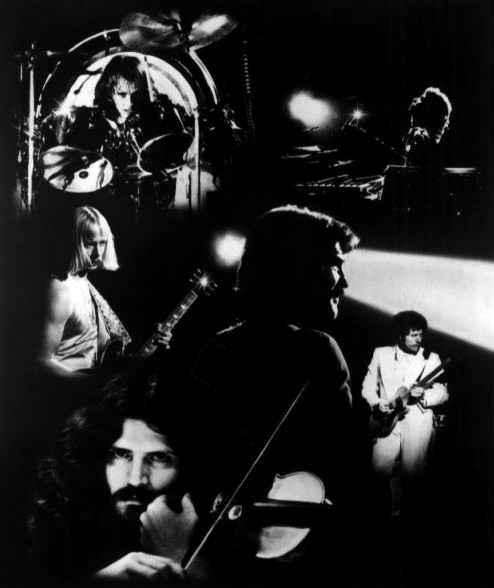
- Back to right Dave Hope, with Kansas in 1976

Background information
- Born: Dave Hope; October 7, 1949 (age 76); Topeka, Kansas, U.S.
- Origin: Topeka, Kansas
- Genres: Progressive rock, rock, Christian rock
- Occupation: Musician
- Instrument: Bass Guitar

Dave Hope (born October 7, 1949) is an American bass guitarist who played with the American progressive rock band Kansas from 1970 (original version) until the band's first split in 1983. When he was in high school, he played the tuba and trumpet in his high school band. In the 1970s, while he was in Kansas, he was known for his heavy drug use. However, in 1980, Hope became a born-again Christian and adopted a much cleaner lifestyle than before.

After the band's split, Hope started the Christian band AD with Kerry Livgren, Michael Gleason, Warren Ham, and Dennis Holt. AD released two albums and toured from 1983 to 1986 before splitting up. In 1990, a German promoter decided to reunite the original Kansas band for a special European tour. Everyone but Robby Steinhardt returned. The band decided to tour America as the original lineup again, but Hope left the band prior to the tour. In 2000, the original lineup of Kansas reunited for the album Somewhere to Elsewhere. Every member of the original lineup returned, including Hope and the band's then-current bass player, Billy Greer.

After leaving Kansas, Hope became an Anglican priest. He retired from Immanuel Anglican Church, a member congregation of the Anglican Mission in America, in Destin, Florida in 2013, where he was the head of Worship, Evangelism and Outreach. He is currently the bassist for a local rock band called "The Mulligans". In 2011, Hope was added to the West Topeka High School hall of fame.

Hope is also the author of a commentary on the Gospel of Luke, "Looking at Luke Through the Eyes of Hope".

== Discography of Dave Hope ==
=== Discography with Kansas ===
- Kansas (1974)
- Song for America (1975)
- Masque (1975)
- Leftoverture (1976)
- Point of Know Return (1977)
- Two for the Show (1978)
- Monolith (1979)
- Audio-Visions (1980)
- Vinyl Confessions (1982)
- Drastic Measures (1983)
- Somewhere to Elsewhere (2000)

=== Discography with Kerry Livgren ===
- Time Line (1984, credited as "Kerry Livgren AD")
- Art of the State (1985, credited as "AD")
- Reconstructions (1986, credited as "AD")
- Prime Mover (1988, credited as "Kerry Livgren AD")
- Reconstructions Reconstructed (1997, credited as "Kerry Livgren AD")
- Prime Mover II (1998, credited as "Kerry Livgren")

=== Discography with Ad Astra ===
- Beyond Our Bounds (2008)
