= Rich Williams =

American guitarist

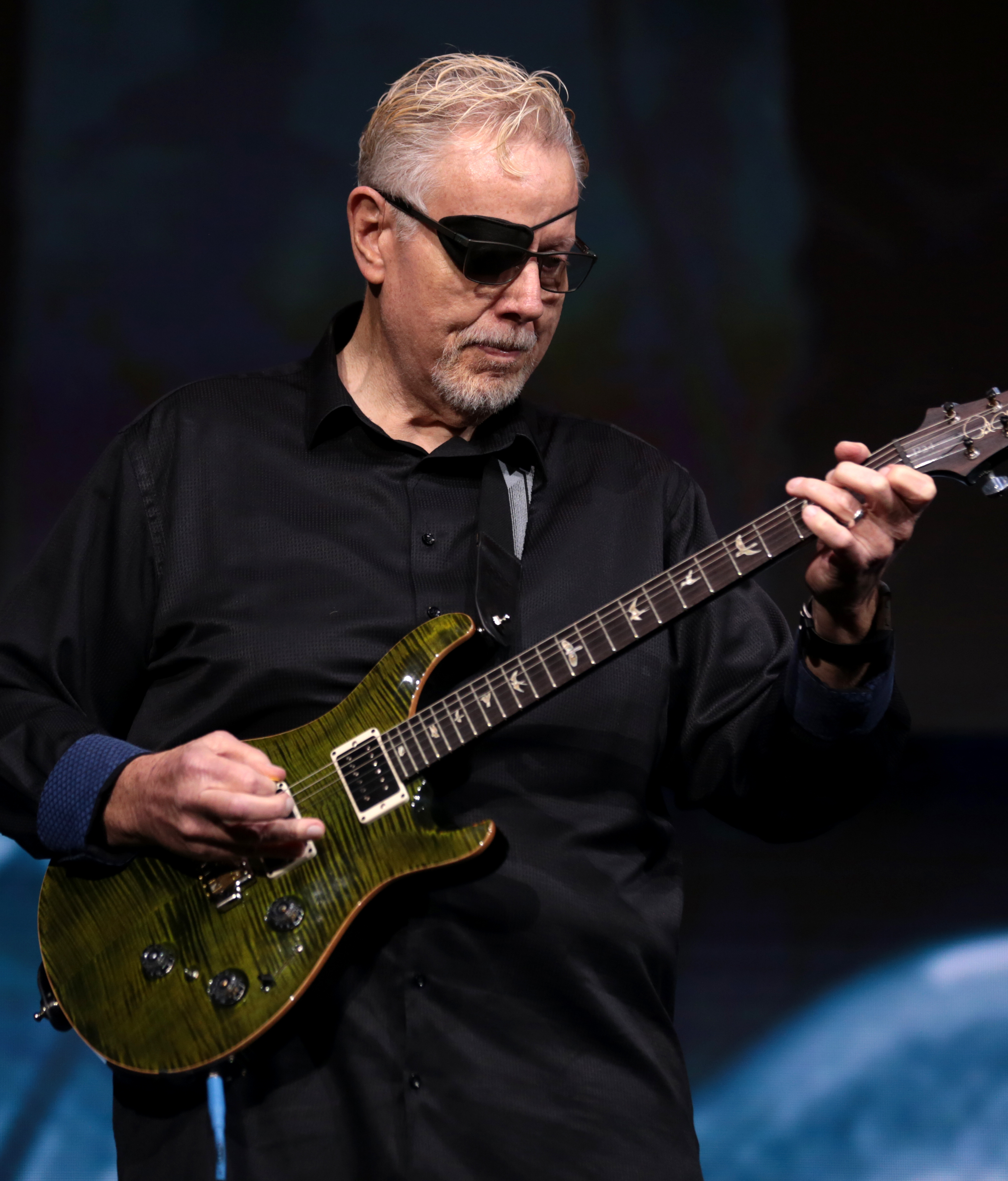
- Williams performing with Kansas in 2017

Background information
- Born: Richard John Williams; February 1, 1950 (age 76); Topeka, Kansas, U.S.
- Genres: Rock, progressive rock
- Occupation: Musician
- Instrument: Guitar
- Member of: Kansas, Native Window

Richard John Williams (born February 1, 1950) is an American guitarist, primarily known for being one of the only consistent original members of the rock band Kansas alongside drummer Phil Ehart. Both have appeared on every Kansas album to date.

== Career ==
Williams shared guitar duties with keyboardist/guitarist Kerry Livgren until 1984 when Kansas first broke up, and later from 1990 to 1991 and 1999 to 2000. From 1985 to 1991, he shared guitar-playing with Steve Morse, and later with Zak Rizvi from 2016 to 2021. Since April 2021, Williams has served as the band's only dedicated guitarist, as he also did from 1991 to 1999, and 2000 to 2016. In live performances, violinist Joe Deninzon serves as a second guitarist when the song being played contains little or no violin, as did his predecessor, David Ragsdale. Williams and Phil Ehart are the only two founding members of Kansas who have never left the band and have played on all Kansas albums. Among the songs Williams co-wrote with the band are "Can I Tell You", "No Room for a Stranger", and the hit "Play the Game Tonight".

In 2009, Williams, along with fellow Kansas members Ehart, Billy Greer, and David Ragsdale, formed a group called Native Window that released one album.

== Discography ==
=== Native Window ===
- Native Window (2009)

=== As a guest ===
- Steve Walsh – Schemer-Dreamer (1980) (on "Schemer-Dreamer/That's All Right")
- Seventh Key – Seventh Key (2001) (on "Missy", "Every Time It Rains" and "No Man's Land")
- John Elefante – On My Way to The Sun (2013) (on "This Is How The Story Goes")

== Personal life ==
Williams lost his right eye in a childhood fireworks accident. He wore a prosthetic eye for many years but now wears an eye patch instead. As a child, Williams began playing a ukulele but quickly transitioned to guitar. His early influences included the Beatles and the overall British Invasion. In 2020, Williams and his wife, Debbie, relocated to Linville, North Carolina. Williams is also a fan of the Kansas City Chiefs.
