= Phil Ehart =

American drummer

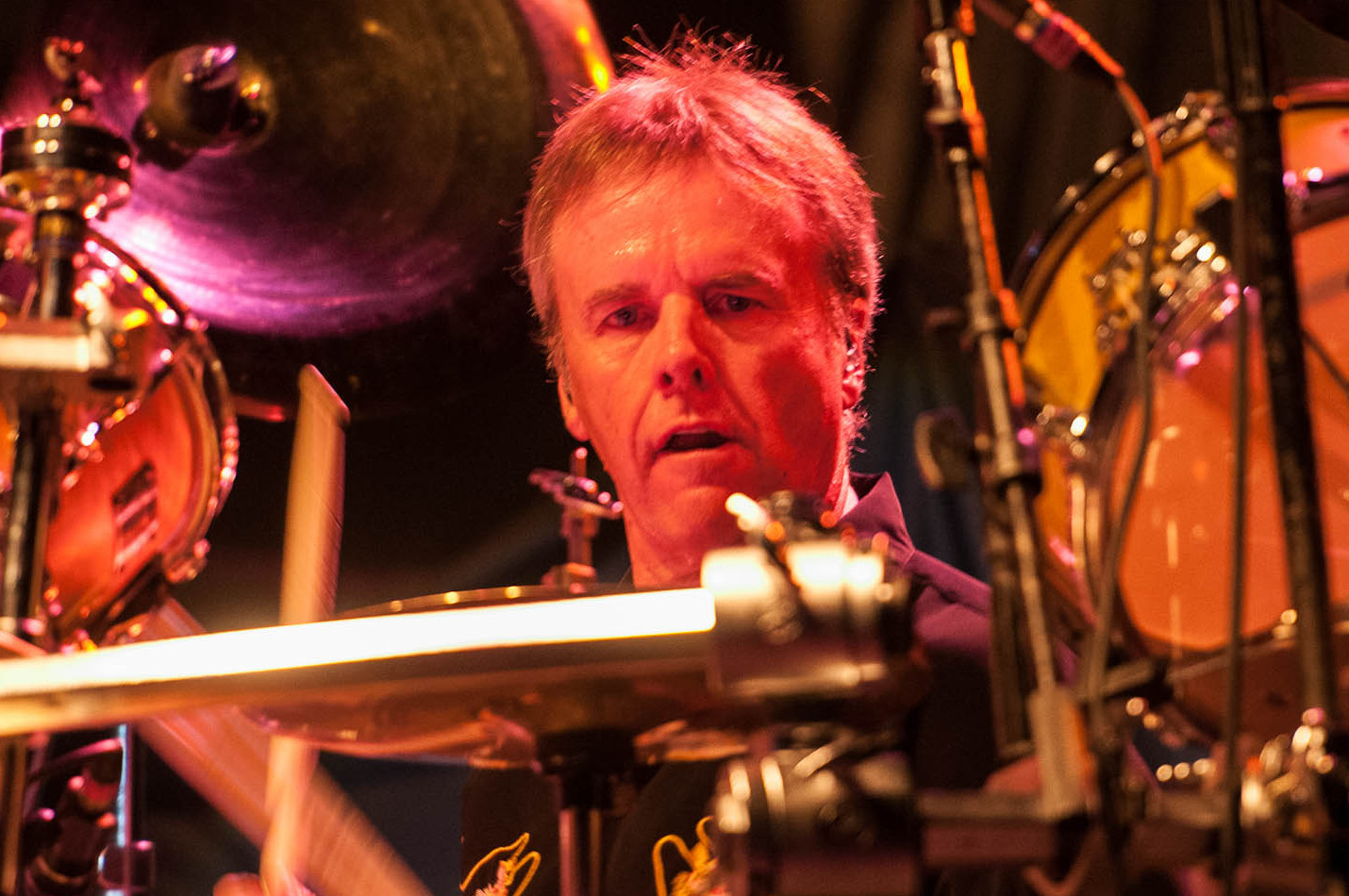
- Phil Ehart performing with Kansas in 2012

Background information
- Born: February 4, 1950 (age 76); Coffeyville, Kansas
- Genres: Rock, progressive rock
- Occupation: Musician
- Instrument: Drums
- Member of: Kansas

Phillip W. Ehart (born February 4, 1950) is the drummer in the progressive rock band Kansas. He and Rich Williams are the only two members who have appeared on every Kansas album. Though his songwriting contributions to the group were few, he co-wrote two of their biggest hits, "Point of Know Return" and "Play the Game Tonight". He has also taken on the band's management responsibilities in recent years.

== Early life ==
Born in Coffeyville, Kansas on February 4, 1950, Ehart became a drummer in grade school. The United States Air Force stationed his father in such countries as England, the Philippines, and Japan.

== Career ==
Ehart contacted Kerry Livgren about joining a band named White Clover after hearing that Livgren's second iteration of Kansas had recently disbanded. With White Clover, he performed at the New Orleans Pop Festival in 1969, which had a huge impact on him. White Clover was renamed Kansas. This third iteration of Kansas became the well-known American progressive rock band.

Like many American musicians in the early 1970s, Ehart wanted to more closely study and play the British style of popular music, so he moved to England. He did not find the atmosphere welcoming, as the musicians there were happier to learn the country and rhythm and blues styles that Ehart brought with him, so he quickly returned to America. In 1978, he and Kansas singer Steve Walsh were invited to play on Steve Hackett's second solo album, Please Don't Touch.

Ehart endorses Yamaha drums, Evans drumheads, Promark drumsticks, and is a longtime user of Zildjian cymbals. Past endorsements include Ludwig Drums, Drum Workshop, Slingerland drums, and Paiste cymbals.
