= Robby Steinhardt =

American rock violinist (1950–2021)

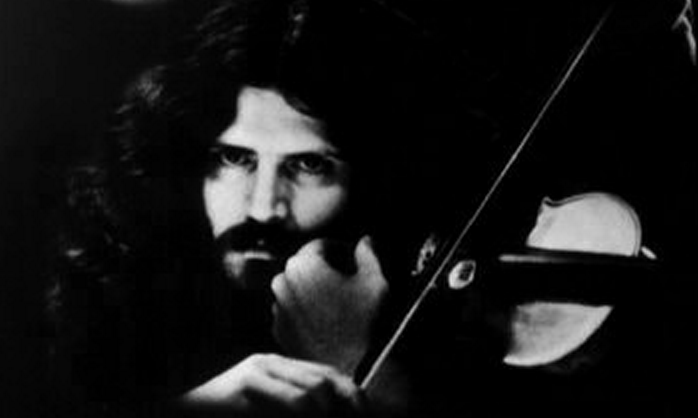
- Robby Steinhardt in a 1976 promotional photo for Kansas

Background information
- Born: Robert Eugene Steinhardt; May 25, 1950; Chicago, Illinois, US
- Origin: Lawrence, Kansas
- Died: July 17, 2021 (aged 71) Tampa, Florida, US
- Genre: Rock
- Occupation: Musician
- Instruments: Vocals; violin; viola; cello; tambourine
- Formerly of: Kansas

Robert Eugene Steinhardt (May 25, 1950 – July 17, 2021) was an American musician best known for his work with rock band Kansas, for which he was co-lead singer, violinist and MC along with keyboardist Steve Walsh, from 1973 to 1982 and from 1997 to 2006. He and Steve Walsh were the only original members of the band not from Topeka.

== Early life ==
Born in Chicago, Illinois in 1950, Steinhardt grew up in Lawrence, Kansas and was the adopted son of Ilse and Milton Steinhardt. Milton Steinhardt was the director of music history at the University of Kansas. Robby started violin lessons at age eight and was classically trained. When his family traveled to Europe, the young Steinhardt played with some orchestras there. Steinhardt attended Lawrence High School and was the concertmaster during his high school years.

== Work with Kansas ==
Steinhardt's violin sound, and its interplay with the guitar and keyboards, helped define the Kansas sound. His lead vocals provided a contrast to the high tenor of singer Steve Walsh. The two often sang in harmony, with Steinhardt taking the lower voice.

Steinhardt joined a re-formed White Clover in 1972, with the group adopting the Kansas name before their first album in 1974. He was with the group through their most successful period. In 1983, he did not show up to record the next Kansas album. His departure from the band after the Vinyl Confessions tour in 1982 was for personal reasons.

Subsequently, he fronted his own band, Steinhardt-Moon and was a member of the Stormbringer Band from 1990 to 1996, recording two CDs with the group during his membership. He also contributed to a Jethro Tull tribute album, To Cry You a Song: A Collection of Tull Tales on Magna Carta Records.

Steinhardt rejoined Kansas in 1997. In early 2006, Steinhardt once again left Kansas by mutual agreement due to the pace of touring. Since he rejoined the band in 1997, they had averaged almost 100 shows per year. Steinhardt served as the MC for the band's concerts when he was a member, with his fellow band member Kerry Livgren describing his role as: "Robby had a unique function as a violinist, second vocalist, and MC in a live situation. Robby was the link between the band on the stage and the audience." Violinist David Ragsdale (Steinhardt's original replacement) quickly replaced him again.

In 2018 Steinhardt was asked by producer Michael T. Franklin to perform on the track "Activate" for Jon Anderson of Yes. The album 1000 Hands: Chapter One had a large cast of classic rock, world music, and jazz performers. In 2020, Steinhardt and Franklin began to work on a solo project, including an album and tour set for 2021. The solo project's resulting album, Not In Kansas Anymore / A Prog Opera, was released posthumously on October 25, 2021.

== Death ==
Steinhardt died at a hospital in Tampa, Florida, from complications of acute pancreatitis on July 17, 2021, at the age of 71.
