= Akademisches Gymnasium (Vienna) =

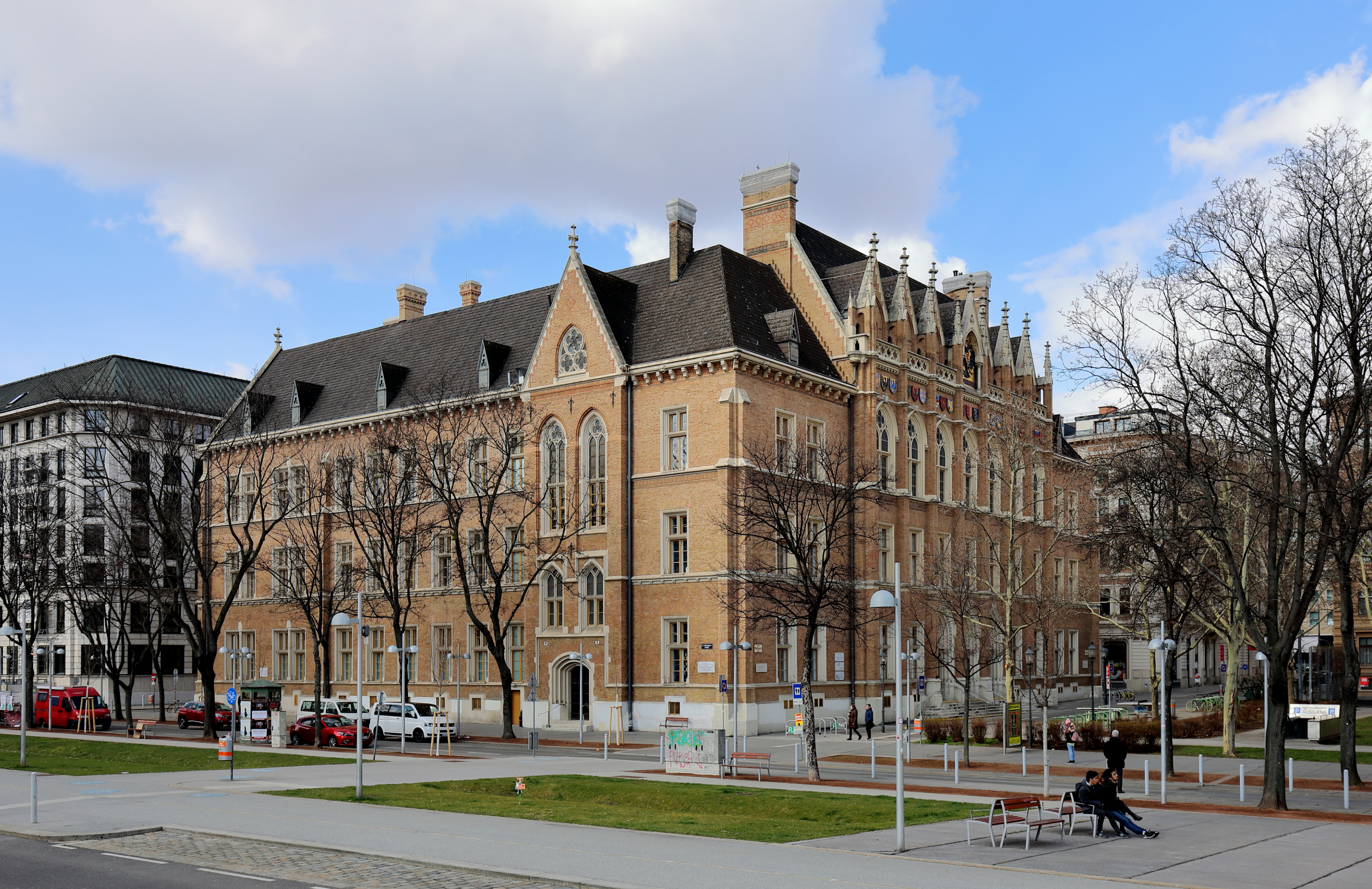

Location
- Beethovenplatz 1 Vienna, 1010; Austria
- 48°12′05″N 16°22′34″E

Information
- Type: State gymnasium school
- Founded: March 1553; 473 years ago
- Founder: Jesuits
- School district: Innere Stadt
- Head of school: Alexander Kandl
- Age range: 10 – 18
- Enrollment: 600
- Classes: 24
- Website: www.akg-wien.at

The Akademisches Gymnasium is a state gymnasium school located in Vienna, Austria. Founded by the Jesuits in March 1553, it is the oldest secondary school in Vienna and is now nondenominational and non-feepaying. The school offers a humanistic education and is known to be rather liberal compared to other traditional secondary schools in the city.

== History ==
=== 16th–18th century ===
In the 16th century, it was the privilege of the University of Vienna to decide about the founding of educational institutions. In March 1553, the Jesuits were granted permission to found the Akademisches Gymnasium.

The main educational objectives of the exclusively Jesuit teachers was to instill knowledge and the practice of Catholicism in the pupils. At the time, the Akademisches Gymnasium was located opposite the university (today the Austrian Academy of Sciences) on the premises of today's Dominican monastery. Pupils were taught in Latin.

=== 18th–20th century ===
In 1773 Pope Clement XIV dissolved the Jesuit order so that both the teaching staff and the educational objectives of the Akademisches Gymnasium changed. The new focus was on History, Mathematics, German, Literature and Geography. The school was now run by the Piarists order.

It became more profane and the spirit of the Enlightenment was felt among teachers as well as pupils. New didactical and paedagogical methods were introduced, as were tuition fees.

As a result of the reform of secondary schools in 1849 the school was restructured to its present curriculum of 8 years ending with the Matura final exam. The humanistic aspects became more and more pronounced as education focused on languages, history, mathematics and the natural sciences. The first Matura exam was held in 1851.

In 1866 the school moved to its present building at Beethovenplatz in the Innere Stadt. It was built by Friedrich von Schmidt, the architect who also designed the Vienna City Hall, in his typical Neo-Gothic style. It was decorated with murals by Josef Matyáš Trenkwald and stained glass by Carl Geyling's Erben.

=== After the World Wars ===
The period after World War I was very difficult for the Akademisches Gymnasium and it narrowly escaped closure because of a rapid decrease in the number of pupils. This development was temporarily reversed but in 1938 the school's fate was again in peril: with the Nazis coming to power in Austria, all the Jewish pupils and three teachers (one of them was David Ernst Oppenheim), had to leave the school thereby reducing the school's studentship by 40 percent. One of the most famous victims of these measures was Nobel laureate Walter Kohn.

After World War II, the Akademisches Gymnasium regained its old reputation. Known as one of the most demanding schools in Austria, it offers a general, humanistic education with a special focus on classical and modern languages preparing its pupils for further academic studies. Several of its teachers also teach at the University of Vienna. State-run, the school is free of charge and admission by merit. Nationwide examination for the Matura is only slowly being introduced in Austria since 2014/15; nevertheless, schools continue to examine their own pupils. Marks on non-centralised exams reflect the school's internal standards. The Akademisches Gymnasium has been performing Greek theatre on a semi-professional level, but is also known for excellent musical performances. Lately, the school's choir has won several competitions.

=== 21st century ===
There continues to be an emphasis on languages. Pupils have 8 years of either English or French, 6 years of Latin (5 years for intakes from 2011), and either 2 years of French or English (3 years from 2011) followed by 4 years of ancient Greek, or 6 years (7 years from 2011) of their second modern language. Italian, Spanish, Russian and Chinese are optional for the last three years.

Additionally, there are many intra- and extra-curricular projects and optional classes. The aim of the Akademisches Gymnasium is to give pupils a broad but solid general education, preparing them for study at university.

The school's main difficulty is lack of space. The landmark building cannot be enlarged, so there is not enough room to offer a place to all of the large number of applicants.

== Notable alumni ==
- Kurt Adler, chorus master and conductor (1943–1973) of the Metropolitan Opera New York City, New York (United States)
- Ludwig Adamovich Jr., President of the Austrian Constitutional Court
- Peter Altenberg, Kaffeehaus writer
- David Josef Bach, arts journalist and music critic for Vienna's Arbeiter-Zeitung (Workers' Times)
- Richard Beer-Hofmann, writer
- Baron Max Wladimir von Beck, Minister-President of Austria
- Christian Broda, federal minister of justice
- Ignaz Franz Castelli (1781–1862), writer
- Thomas Chorherr, journalist, editor-in-chief of Die Presse
- Robert Danneberg, politician
- Paul Edwards, philosopher
- Paul Ehrenfest, physicist and mathematician
- Caspar Einem, federal minister of internal affairs and transport
- Paul Chaim Eisenberg, chief rabbi of Vienna
- Cajetan von Felder, mayor of Vienna
- Leopold Fischer, aka Agehananda Bharati (1923–1991), academic Sanskritist, Hindu monk, and professor of anthropology at Syracuse University
- Wolfgang Glück, film director
- Raimund Grübl, mayor of Vienna
- Karl Samuel Grünhut, jurist
- Paul Gulda, pianist
- Wilhelm Ritter von Haidinger (1795–1871), geologist
- Michael Hainisch, Federal President of Austria
- Martin Haselböck, organist
- Friedrich Heer, writer, historian
- Hugo von Hofmannsthal, playwright
- Karl Kautsky, theoretician of orthodox Marxism
- Hans Kelsen, constitutional lawyer, author of the Constitution of Austria
- Walter Kohn, physicist, Nobel laureate for chemistry in 1998
- Stanislaus Kostka (1550–1568), Catholic saint
- Joseph Kupelwieser (1791–1866), theatre director and libretist
- Leopold Kupelwieser (1796–1862), painter
- Markus Kupferblum, theatre and opera director
- Paul Lazarsfeld, sociologist
- Robert von Lieben, physicist
- Felix von Luschan, doctor, anthropologist, explorer, archaeologist and ethnographer
- Titu Maiorescu, Prime Minister of Romania
- Miki Malör, theatre and performance artist
- Paulus Manker, actor and film director
- Tomáš Garrigue Masaryk, founder and first President of Czechoslovakia
- Alexius Meinong, philosopher
- Lise Meitner, physicist
- Ludwig von Mises, economist
- Richard von Mises, mathematician, early member of the Vienna Circle
- Johann Nestroy, actor, playwright, poet
- Ignaz von Plener, politician, minister and Minister-President of Austria, Cisleithania
- Johann Nepomuk Prix, mayor of Vienna
- Doron Rabinovici, writer
- Joseph Othmar von Rauscher (1797–1875), archbishop of Vienna
- Elise Richter, philologist
- Erwin Ringel, physician, psychologist
- Arthur Schnitzler, playwright, physician
- Erwin Schrödinger, physicist, Nobel laureate for physics in 1933
- Franz Schubert (1797–1828), composer
- Johann Carl Smirsch (1793–1869), painter
- Eduard Strauss, composer
- Franz, Prince of Thun and Hohenstein, governor of Bohemia, Minister-President of Austria
- Milan Turković, bassoonist and conductor
- Oliver Vitouch, rector of the University of Klagenfurt and president of Universities Austria
- Otto Wagner, architect

== See also ==
- List of Jesuit educational institutions
