= Miracle Mile (Guardian album) =

Studio album by Guardian
- Released: June 8, 1993
- Recorded: August 3, 1992 – December 23, 1992
- Genre: Christian metal, blues rock Hard rock, hard/metal.
- Length: 56:55
- Label: Word, Epic
- Producer: John & Dino Elefante

Guardian chronology
Fire and Love (1990)	Miracle Mile (1993)	Swing, Swang, Swung (1994)

Professional ratings
Review scores
Source	Rating
AllMusic	4.5/5 stars

Miracle Mile is the third album of Christian rock band Guardian. It was recorded at the end of 1992 and released in 1993. The album was produced by the Elefante brothers, who were also producing albums for legendary Christian band Petra.

This is considered the band's most successful album to date.

== Track listing ==
All songs written by Guardian, except where noted.

1. "Dr. Jones and the Kings of Rhythm" (Bach, Rowe, Palacios) – 5:13
2. "Shoeshine Johnny" – 4:15
3. "Long Way Home" (Palacios, Rowe) – 4:31
4. "I Found Love" (Bach, Elefante, Palacios, Rowe) – 5:24
5. "Sweet Mystery" (Bach) – 3:57
6. "Let It Roll" – 4:10
7. "Mr. Do Wrong" – 5:02
8. "Curiosity (Killed the Cat)" (Bach, Palacios, Rowe) – 4:27
9. "Sister Wisdom" (Bach, Palacios, Rowe) – 4:12
10. "The Captain" (Bach, George Breingan, Palacios) – 4:18
11. "You & I" (Bach, Palacios, Rowe) – 4:03
12. "Do You Know What Love Is" – 7:26

== Personnel ==
Guardian

- Jamie Rowe – lead vocals
- Tony Palacios – guitars, backing vocals
- David Bach – bass, backing vocals
- Karl Ney – drums

Guest musicians

- John Elefante – acoustic piano, organ
- Glen Hirami – accordion
- J.R. McNeely – bass
- Jamie Wollam – drums
- Ian Sabreti – percussion
- The Fabulous Martin Brothers Horns:
  - Scott Martin – saxophones
  - Andy Martin – trombone
  - Stan Martin – trumpet, flugelhorn
- Tom Howard – string arrangements and direction
- The Orange County Wire Choir – strings
- JoJo Beiden – backing vocals
- Jameeca LaFleur – backing vocals
- Olivia McClurkin – backing vocals
- Brandon Starr – backing vocals

== Production ==
- John Elefante – producer, engineer
- Dino Elefante – producer, engineer, mixing
- Doug Beiden – engineer, mix assistant
- J.R. McNeely – engineer
- Gil Griffith – mix assistant
- Chris Bellman – mastering
- Joe Potter – art production
- David Bach – art direction, design
- Neil Zlozower – photography
- The Whitmore Company – management
- Recorded and Mixed at Pakaderm Studios (Los Alamitos, California).
- Mastered at Bernie Grundman Mastering (Hollywood, California).
