= Swing, Swang, Swung =

Studio album by Guardian
- Released: 1994
- Studios: Snack Bar, Nashville, Tennessee
- Genre: Christian rock
- Length: 51:12
- Labels: Pakaderm, Myrrh
- Producers: John and Dino Elefante

Guardian chronology
Miracle Mile (1993)	Swing, Swang, Swung (1994)	Nunca te diré adiós (1994)

Singles from Swing, Swang, Swung
- 1. "Like The Sun" Released: 1994; 2. "C'mon Everyone" Released: 1994; 3. "See You in Heaven" Released: 1994

Professional ratings
Review scores
Source	Rating
AllMusic	2/5 stars

Swing, Swang, Swung is the fourth studio album of Christian rock band Guardian. It was released in 1994 by Pakaderm Records.

The album takes the band into experimental grounds in folk and acoustic music. However, it was harshly criticized by fans for leaving behind their rock and metal roots.

== Track listing ==
All songs written by Tony Palacios except where noted.

1. "The Way Home Back" – 4:32
2. "Endless Summer" (Bach) – 4:30
3. "C'mon Everyone" – 4:58
4. "Like the Sun" (Bach) – 5:18
5. "Rich Man Over the Line" – 4:04
6. "Your Love" (Rowe) – 4:46
7. "Don't Say That It's Over" (Bach) – 4:47
8. "See You in Heaven" – 4:38
9. "Let the Whole World" – 5:02
10. "Preacher and the Bear" (Traditional, arranged by Guardian) – 3:14
11. "Still on My Mind" – 3:48
12. "Why Don't We" (Ney) – 1:29

== Personnel ==
adapted from liner notes:

Guardian

- Jamie Rowe – lead vocals
- Tony Palacios – guitars, vocals
- David Bach – bass, vocals, rhythm guitar (7)
- Karl Ney – drums

Additional musicians

- John Elefante – Mellotron, assorted digital claviers, drums
- Michael W. Smith – acoustic piano
- J.R. McNeely – Nashville guitar, bass
- Jon Knox – drums (1, 3–6)
- Matt Davich – clarinet
- Bill Huber – trombone
- David Balph – trumpet
- The Nashville String Machine – strings
- Tom Howard – sting arrangements and director

== Production ==
- John Elefante – producer
- Dino Elefante – producer
- Mark Maxwell – A&R
- J.R. McNeely – engineer, mixing
- Ken Love – mastering
- Diana Barnes – art direction, design
- David Bach – design
- Michael Wilson – photography
- Marc Whitmore – management

Studios

- The Snack Bar (Brentwood, Tennessee) – recording location
- Sound Kitchen (Franklin, Tennessee) – mixing location
- MasterMix (Nashville, Tennessee) – mastering location
