= David Bach =

David Bach may refer to:

- David Bach (author) (born 1966), American financial columnist and author
- David Bach (musician), American bass guitarist
- David Bach (poker player) (born 1971), American professional poker player
- David Josef Bach (1874–1947), Vienna cultural figure
