= Smashes: The Best of Guardian =

Greatest hits album by Guardian
- Released: 1999
- Genre: Christian rock
- Label: Myrrh

Guardian chronology
Promesa (1997)	Smashes: The Best of Guardian (1999)	Dime (2001)

Professional ratings
Review scores
Source	Rating
The Phantom Tollbooth	not rated link
HM	not rated

Smashes: The Best of Guardian is a compilation album released by Christian rock band Guardian. The album was released in 1999 by Myrrh Records.

The album includes the band's hits since 1993 when Jamie Rowe and Karl Ney joined the band.

== Track listing ==
1. "Dr. Jones and The Kings of Rhythm" (Bach, Palacios, Rowe) - 5:10
2. "Shoeshine Johnny" (Bach, Ney, Palacios, Rowe) - 4:17
3. "The Way Back Home" (Palacios) - 4:31
4. "Endless Summer" (Bach) - 4:30
5. "C'mon Everyone" (Palacios) - 4:59
6. "This Old Man" (Palacios, Rowe, Taylor) - 2:30
7. "Lead the Way" (Rowe, Taylor) - 2:44
8. "Lion's Den" (Palacios, Rowe, Taylor) - 3:54
9. "State of Mine" (Bach, Rowe) - 3:04
10. "Psychedelic Runaway" (Palacios) - 3:25
11. "Bottlerocket" (Bach, Palacios, Rowe, Taylor) - 3:44
12. "Coffee Can" (Palacios, Taylor) - 3:44
13. "Break Me Down" (Palacios) - 3:42
14. "This Old Man (T.R.'s This Old Dub Mix)" (Palacios, Rowe, Taylor) - 4:53
15. "Bottlerocket (CHR Remix)" (Bach, Palacios, Rowe, Taylor) - 3:52
16. "Babble On (Acoustic Remix)" (Palacios, Rowe, Taylor) - 4:38
17. "Queen Esther (Mellow Remix)" (Palacios) - 3:47
18. "Bottlerocket (Dance Remix)" (Bach, Palacios, Rowe, Taylor) - 4:33

== Personnel ==
- Jamie Rowe – vocals
- David Bach – bass guitar, background vocals
- Karl Ney – drums
- Tony Palacios – guitar, background vocals
