= Fire and Love =

Studio album by Guardian
- Released: 1991
- Recorded: 1990
- Genre: Christian metal
- Length: 44:56
- Label: Pakaderm
- Producer: John & Dino Elefante

Guardian chronology
First Watch (1989)	Fire and Love (1991)	Miracle Mile (1993)

Professional ratings
Review scores
Source	Rating
AllMusic	2.5/5 stars
Cornerstone	(not rated)

Fire and Love is the second album of Christian metal band Guardian. It was released in 1991 and featured an arena rock sound, described by Cornerstone as "Bon Jovi to the bone".

This is the first album to feature Jamie Rowe on vocals and Karl Ney on drums.

== Track listing ==
All songs written by David Bach, Tony Palacios, Jamie Rowe and John Elefante except where noted.

1. "Power of Love" - 4:33
2. "Send a Message" - 4:00
3. "Time Stands Still" (Palacios) - 4:26
4. "Forever and a Day" - 5:11
5. "Takin' on the World" (Guardian, J. Elefante) - 3:52
6. "Fire and Love" - 3:25
7. "Turnaround" (Bach, Palacios, Rowe) - 4:18
8. "Time and Time Again" - 4:52
9. "The Rain" (Bach, Palacios, Rowe) - 5:31
10. "Never Say Goodbye" - 5:06

== Personnel ==
Guardian

- Jamie Rowe – lead vocals, backing vocals
- Tony Palacios – guitars, backing vocals
- David Bach – bass, backing vocals
- Karl Ney – drums

Additional musicians

- John Elefante – keyboards, backing vocals
- Glen Hirami – accordion
- Ron Eglit – pedal steel guitar
- David Raven – drums
- Dino Elefante – backing vocals

== Production ==
- John Elefante – producer, engineer
- Dino Elefante – producer, engineer, mixing
- MIke Mierau – engineer, mixing
- Jeff Simmons – engineer
- Gil Griffith – mix assistant
- Terry DeGraff – art direction, design
- Sandra Ney – cover consultant
- Jeff Jones – photography
- Recorded and mixed at Pakaderm Studios (Los Alamitos, California)
- Mastered at Precision Mastering (Hollywood, California)
