= Bottle Rocket (album) =

Studio album by Guardian
- Released: August 5, 1997
- Genre: Christian rock
- Length: 50:29
- Label: Word
- Producer: Steve Taylor

Guardian chronology
Buzz (1995)	Bottle Rocket (1997)	Promesa (1997)

Professional ratings
Review scores
Source	Rating
AllMusic	3/5 stars
The Phantom Tollbooth	(not rated)

Bottle Rocket is one of the albums from Christian rock band Guardian. The album was released on August 5, 1997 and was produced by Steve Taylor.

This album delved deeper into the alternative and grunge genre the band explored in their previous album.

== Track listing ==
1. "Are We Feeling Comfortable Yet?" (Rowe, Taylor) - 3:15
2. "Bottle Rocket" (Bach, Palacios, Rowe, Taylor) - 3:43
3. "Coffee Can" (Palacios, Taylor) - 3:44
4. "Revelation" (Bach, Rowe) - 3:46
5. "What Does It Take?" (Rowe, Taylor) - 4:09
6. "Babble On" (Palacios, Rowe, Taylor) - 4:26
7. "Blue Light Special" (Bach, Palacios, Taylor) - 2:43
8. "Break Me Down" (Palacios) - 3:40
9. "The Water Is Fine" (Palacios, Taylor) - 2:45
10. "My Queen Esther" (Palacios) - 3:47
11. "Hell to Pay" (Palacios, Taylor) - 3:22
12. "Fear the Auctioneer" (Palacios, Taylor) - 2:56
13. "Harder Than It Seems" (Rowe, Taylor) - 4:15
14. "Salvation" (Bach, Palacios, Rowe) - 3:58

== Song Meanings ==
- "Coffee Can" was written by guitarist Tony Palacios and was inspired by a recurring dream his mother had shortly before she died of cancer. In the dream she was trying to fly to heaven on a coffee can, but couldn't get it more than a foot or two off the ground. "The dream image became a metaphor for the futility of trusting in one's own strength, and consequently a metaphor of the deep need for grace".
- "My Queen Esther" and "What Does It Take" deal with the easing of burdens at the foot of the cross for "those who labor and are heavy laden."
- The title cut, "Bottle Rocket," (a 90's version of "This Little Light of Mine") is an encouragement to live out your faith in view of the world.

== Personnel ==
Guardian

- Jamie Rowe – vocals
- Tony Palacios – guitars, vocals
- David Bach – bass, vocals
- Karl Ney – drums

Guest musicians

- John Mark Painter – theremin (2), strings (2), Mellotron (2, 10, 11), keyboards (12)
- Eric Darken – percussion
- Russ Long – tambourine (6)
- Shane Boyd – poetic recitation (7)

== Production ==
- Steve Taylor – producer
- Jim Chaffee – executive producer, A&R direction
- Russ Long – engineer, mixing
- Steve Bishir – additional engineer
- Wade Jaynes – additional engineer
- David Schober – additional engineer
- Chris Grainger – recording assistant, mix assistant (5, 9, 14)
- Rich Hanson – recording assistant
- Dave Latto – recording assistant
- Amanda Sears – recording assistant
- Jason Van Pelt – recording assistant
- Kenton Kelsey – mix assistant (1-4, 6-8, 10-12)
- Bob Ludwig – mastering
- Buddy Jackson – art direction
- Christine Knubel – design
- Matthew Barnes – photography
- Lord & Michaels Inc. – management

Studios

- Recorded at Quad Studios and The Carport (Nashville, Tennessee).
- Mixed at Sound Kitchen (Franklin, Tennessee) and The Carport.
- Mastered at Gateway Mastering (Portland, Maine).
