= Promesa (album) =

Studio album by Guardian
- Released: August 6, 1998
- Genre: Christian rock
- Label: Word

Guardian chronology
Bottle Rocket (1997)	Promesa (1998)	Smashes: The Best of Guardian (1999)

Promesa is the second Spanish-language album released by Christian rock band Guardian. The album was released on August 6, 1998 and included Spanish covers of several of the songs from Buzz and Bottle Rocket.

The album followed the massive success the band had in Latin America with their first Spanish release, Nunca te diré adiós.

== Track listing ==
1. "Tu Amor" (Miracle Mile "I Found Love") – 5:20
2. "No Compitas Por Su Amor" (Buzz "Them Nails") – 2:28
3. "Sé Me Guía" (Buzz "Lead The Way") – 2:44
4. "Levántame" (Buzz "Lift Me Up") – 2:57
5. "Cómo Podría Hacerte Ver?" (Bottle Rocket "What does it take?") – 4:09
6. "Dulce Misterio" (Miracle Mile "Sweet Mystery) – 3:39
7. "Promesa" (Bottle Rocket "Revelation") – 3:55
8. "Una Tonta Realidad" (Buzz "Psychedelyc Runaway") – 3:26
9. "Esther" (Bottle Rocket "My Queen Esther") – 3:46
10. "Ya No Llores Mas" (Buzz "Lullaby") – 2:49

== Personnel ==
- Jamie Rowe – vocals
- David Bach – bass guitar, vocals
- Karl Ney – drums
- Tony Palacios – guitar, vocals
