= On Suicide =

1967 translation by Paul Friedman

On Suicide: With Particular Reference to Suicide Among Young Students
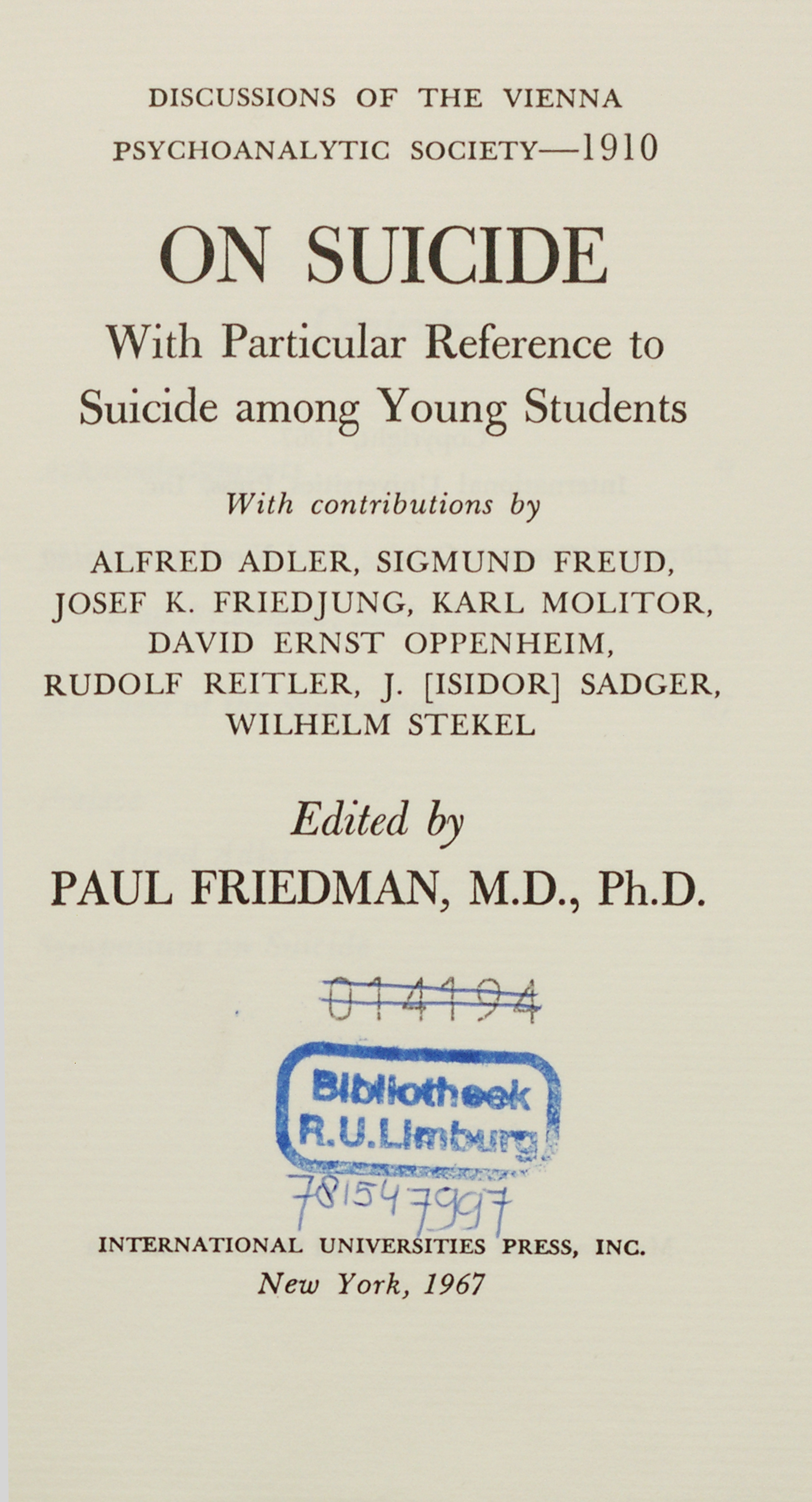
- Author: Paul Friedman
- Language: English
- Subject: Psychology, Psychoanalytic theory, Suicide
- Publisher: International Universities Press
- Publication date: 1967
- Publication place: United States
- Media type: print
- Pages: 141
- ISBN: 9780823638604

On Suicide: With Particular Reference to Suicide Among Young Students is a 1967 English translation and editing by the psychoanalyst and suicidologist Paul Friedman of the original "Über den Selbstmord insbesondere den Schüler-Selbstmord" by the Vienna Psychoanalytic Society. The original piece was published in 1910 in German and includes psychoanalytic discussions from eight members of the society about the causes and explanations for the suicide of students.

The eight members are Sigmund Freud, Alfred Adler, Josef Karl Friedjung, Carl Furtmüller (pseudonym: Karl Monitor), David Ernst Oppenheim, Rudolf Reitler, J. Isidor Sadger and Wilhelm Stekel. The translation by Friedman was a project of the Library Committee of the New York Psychoanalytic Institute to give non-German speakers access to the historical document.

== Content ==
=== Timeframe ===
In the foreword written by Paul Friedman, the author stresses the historical significance of the document as it was one of the last meetings of the society. Giving an illustration of the Zeitgeist of 1910 he describes an "epidemic" of suicides among young students, partly due to the book The Sorrows of Young Werther written by Goethe. Furthermore, the author displays the time before 1900 as a deterministic philosophy where human behavior was attributed to outer abiding causes and was rationalized.

According to Friedman, in the realm of psychiatry suicide was associated with mental disorders, caused by predisposing factors such as heredity. The etiology of suicide presented by the symposium on suicide is therefore seen as revolutionary in the author's eyes. Especially, topics such as psychosexual crisis, heterosexual and homosexual conflict, as well as an association between murder and suicide, went against the strong resistance of psychological thinking in the beginning of the 20th century.

The preface was written by Alfred Adler on behalf of the society and gives further information about the members of the circle. He describes that the Vienna psychoanalytic Society met every week for seven years and is composed of physicians and psychologists, all applying the psychoanalytic method first used by Breuer.

=== Symposium on Suicide ===
==== David Ernst Oppenheim ====
Oppenheim was an Austrian gymnasium teacher and a psychologist who starts the discussion by arguing that in the cause and prevention of suicide among young students, the least blame should be put on teachers. The educationalist argues that teachers have to observe too many children with not enough time and primarily focus on the intellectual abilities of the child. Despite having the time and resources for observation, the family of affected adolescents often do not notice or report the psychological conflicts of their child. Referring to an investigation of 320 suicide cases by Eulenburg, the psychoanalyst states that one-fourth of suicides among students can be attributed to a lack of ability in school.

He argues that blinded by their ambition, parents often force children to attend school although students experience failures due to a lack of understanding. In his opinion, mentally and physically “unfit” students should be dismissed from school. Oppenheim further notices that opportunities for self-destruction such as weapons or robes produce “suggestive excitation” in young people, luring them into an imitation of the suicidal act. In his opinion, children are more likely to imitate their environment and this effect is even further amplified by the details of suicides reported in the news.

==== Sigmund Freud ====
The neurologist does not share Oppenheim's opinion on the responsibility of schools. He is of the opinion that teachers should be supporting students as surrogates of their families and fail to arouse their interest in life. Freud later ends the discussion by claiming that there is still not enough psychoanalytic understanding about the emotional processes and changes of the libido as causes of suicide.

==== Rudolf Reitler ====
Reitler diagnoses suicidal ideas as a mixed form of psychoneurosis, phobia of examination and obsessions of self-destruction. Apart from the examination anxiety, all other motives are unconscious to the student. The outset of anxiety is often not attributed to a specific object and is therefore often described as the “fear of fear”. Unconsciously, the fear is caused by repressing a sexual urge leading to an unresolved sexual tension. The anxiety is then transferred to the social sphere namely the school environment. In Reiter's opinion students focusing completely on their anxiety and phobia of school will eventually commit suicide. Students that learn to release their sexual tension through masturbation, on the other hand, return to a healthy state.

==== Josef Karl Friedjung ====
The Austrian pediatrician and politician Friedjung illustrates the inadequacy of often obvious explanations for self-murder. He describes the suicide of a young woman interpreted by her parents as a reaction to her failed marriage but which was actually deeply rooted in the unrequited love to another man.

==== Dr. Isidor Sadger ====
The forensic doctor Sadger mainly addresses the deprivation from love as a main motive of student suicide. Sadger characterized puberty as a period of enormous need for love, emotional involvement, and sexual experiences. Unfortunately, this destitution of love is often misinterpreted by parents and teachers leading to students losing all interest in school and life in general due to a lack of affection. Finally, this perceived abandonment leads to their loss of all hope for love causing them to commit suicide.

==== Wilhelm Stekel ====
The physician Stekel, who committed suicide himself, touches on the association between suicide and murder.

"No one kills himself who has never wanted to kill another or at least wished the death of another".

— Wilhelm Stekel, On suicide

The guilt about the own sinful wishes of the death of family and teachers, which are elicited by feelings of hatred and revenge, arises the desire for punishment of oneself through suicide. Moreover, Stekel mentions that suicides often occur after ceasing from masturbation. Due to the view about onanistic acts in society many develop a disgust about themselves turning into a disgust about life in general. A possible solution is that teachers should show the child the richness of life and their independence from old imperatives and ethical or religious inhibitions.

==== Dr. Alfred Adler ====
The Austrian psychotherapist emphasizes the similarity of suicidal personalities to nervous illnesses. According to him, suicide victims are mainly shaped by an inferiority complex from their early development. This deep-seated insecurity and anxiety causes them to overcompensate with extreme ambitiousness for success, attention, and support of others. Suicide lastly demonstrates the escape from the injustices of life and the “Weltschmerz” they had to suffer from.

==== Carl Furtmüller (pseudonym: Karl Monitor) ====
Furtmüller further supports Oppenheim's defense of teachers and stresses the problem of the “privilege system” and the coercion for obedience in society. Due to overcrowding of schools, students without parental connections need the best grades to find a good job. In this competitive environment, the success of a child receives more attention than their personal development. Under these conditions, especially the suicidal personality described by Adler suffers from bullying and failure. The lack of time of teachers leads them to ignore “failures” and defiant students.

== Reception ==
- In 1968, Edwin Shneidman organized a meeting of the leading experts on suicide. The circle consisted, among six others, of Paul Friedman, and was meant to resemble the Symposium of the Vienna Psychoanalytic Society on suicide in 1910 as it took the translation "On suicide" as a starting point. From the members of the meeting in Chicago, the American Association of Suicidology (AAS) was founded which aims to research and prevent suicide to this day.
- The psychoanalytic ideas of Paul Friedman were further used in the case study of „Vivienne“, a 14-year-old student who committed suicide in 1973. In their book, John E. Mack and Holly Hickler quote Friedman's opinion that parents and school authorities are partially responsible for adolescent suicides.
- The ideas of the Symposium (1910) are still used to evaluate psychotherapy for suicidals as a current German psychology textbook shows.
- The question about the responsibility of the school system in suicide cases between 1880 and 1932 was further assessed by Joachim Schiller.

== See also ==
- Psychoanalytic theory
- Suicide
- Psychoneurosis
