= Promesa =

Promesa, or variants, may refer to:

- PROMESA, Puerto Rico Oversight, Management, and Economic Stability Act
- Promesa (album), album by Guardian
- Promesas, album by José José 1985
- La Promesa, album by Justin Quiles 2016
- La Promesa Foundation, radio network
- "Promesa", a song by Rosalía and Rauw Alejandro from RR

== See also ==
- Promession
