= First Watch =

First Watch may refer to:

- First Watch (album), a Christian rock album by Guardian
- First Watch (restaurant chain), breakfast, brunch and lunch cafes
- The "first watch" work duty in watchkeeping
