= Jamie Rowe =

American singer

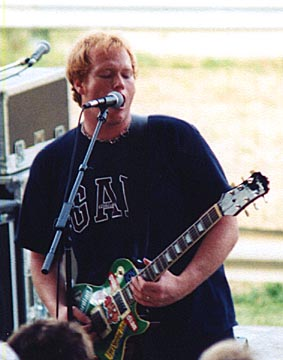
- Rowe c. 1999

Background information
- Also known as: J.R. Rowe
- Born: Earl Wilson Rowe, Jr. April 7, 1970 (age 56); Princeton, Indiana
- Origin: United States
- Genres: Christian rock, rock
- Instruments: Vocals, guitars
- Years active: 1990-present
- Website: JamieRowe.com

Earl Wilson Rowe, Jr. (born April 7, 1970), known professionally as Jamie Rowe, is a musician best known as the lead vocalist of the Christian hard rock band, Guardian. He has also been vocalist for New York-based AdrianGale, power pop band London Calling (which briefly became The Ruled), and most recently collaborating with Jamey Perrenot in The Lost Days of Summer. He has also released several solo works including the single "I Do" written for his wife, Amber Rowe, for their wedding. In 2019, a solo album, This Is Home, was recorded.

== Background ==
Billed as "J.R. Rowe," Rowe began with the band, Tempest, as a teenager in the late 1980s. Their debut album, A Coming Storm, recorded on Pure Metal Records in 1987, features Rowe's vocals with less grit and more high, falsetto screams (à la metallurgist mentor Stryper's Michael Sweet) than in his later work, and the lyrics contain a straightforward evangelical candor. The album was not released to compact disc until 1999. Tempest recorded their second and last album, The Eye of the Storm, on Pure Metal in 1988, wherein, looking at the disc insert, Rowe's former unequivocal lyrics were traded in for those with an ambiguous "you" supplanting references to God in such songs as "True Love (Never Fade Away)" and "Lost Without Your Love." Amid internal turmoil, Tempest disbanded in 1990.

Rowe joined the Los Angeles-based band Guardian after being introduced to the band by producers Dino and John Elefante. Their second release, 1991's Fire and Love, was on the Elefante's Pakaderm label imprint and distributed on Epic Records. The band had moderate success with the video for the song "Power of Love" on MTV's Headbangers Ball rotation and they toured throughout 1991 and opened a European tour with Stryper in 1992. The band released Miracle Mile in 1993, Swing, Swang, Swung in 1994, Buzz in 1995 and Bottle Rocket. They also released several Spanish-language albums, Nunca Te Diré Adiós (I Will Never Say Goodbye) in 1995, Promesa (Promise) in 1997, Dime (Tell me) in 2001 and recorded several personal projects including The Yellow and Black Attack Is Back!, a tribute to Stryper. In 2014, the band reunited to record and release a new album titled "Almost Home". The album debuted on the Top 10 Rock Chart on iTunes.

Rowe released a solo album, The Beautiful EP (1999, Massive Groove Records), which was to be followed by a full-length project. Songs for Heaven & Earth, was released in 2004. In 2006, it was re-released digitally by Rowe's own imprint, Peppermint Daisy Music.

In 2000, Rowe formed AdrianGale with Vic Rivera, Scott Miller and Scott Novello. They are a melodic rock band similar in style to Guardian. While the band's lyrics were not explicitly Christian, they were generally positive in nature. The band released four studio albums and one live album before issues with their record label forced the band to leave the name behind. The new band, known as Crunch (also the title of AdrianGale's fourth and final studio album), recorded two EPs worth of material and were a featured band at the prestigious Firefest IV Festival in Nottingham, England in October 2007 (their performance was filmed and released as a concert DVD by Transistor Pictures and the Firefest organization in 2010).

In late 2012, Kivel Records was able to come to terms with Rowe and Vic Rivera and Adriangale was successfully resurrected, resulting in Rowe and the band quietly recording their latest album, "Suckerpunch!", which was released on September 27, 2013, coinciding with their comeback appearance at MelodicRockFest 3 in Arlington Heights, Illinois. The album and performance were met with immediate praise from critics and fans alike, with Rowe and the band planning to continue recording and playing live as Adriangale.

In 2017, Rowe and Guardian bandmate David Bach joined with Rex Carroll and Mike Feighan of Whitecross to record Revival, a new compilation of Whitecross and Guardian tracks and went on a short tour to promote the project.

In February 2019, a Kickstarter campaign was launched for a new EP. It met the goal in 11 days and stretch goals converted the EP into an eight-song album. A country-influenced rock album, This Is Home is set to be released in mid-August 2019 to backers with a public release in September.

== Discography ==
Tempest

- A Coming Storm (1987, CD Released in 1988)
- Eye of the Storm (1989)

Guardian

- Fire and Love (1990)
- Miracle Mile (1993)
- Swing, Swang, Swung (1994)
- Buzz (1995)
- Nunca Te Dire Adios (1995)
- Bottle Rocket (1997)
- Promesa (1997)
- Dime (2001)
- House of Guardian: Volume 1 EP (digital download only) (2007)
- Rockin' In The Free World Single (digital download only) (2010)
- Three To Get Ready EP (digital download only) (2011)
- Almost Home (2014)
- Revival, The Great Whitecross & Guardian (2017)

Solo

- The Beautiful EP (1999)
- Peppermint Daisy Music (2000)
- Songs for Heaven and Earth (2004)
- Shelter Me Single (digital download only) (2007)
- Just Remember I Love You Single (digital download only) (2011)
- I Do (Single) 2016
- Jesus is the Way (Acoustic Version) (Single) 2018
- This is Home 2019

Adriangale

- Feel the Fire (2000)
- Under the Hood (2001)
- Re:Program (2002)
- Live Program (2003)
- Crunch (2004)
- Suckerpunch! (2013)
- Defiance (2014)

Crunch

- Starting Over EP (2007)
- Starting Over: Live at Firefest DVD (2007)
- Second Time Around EP (2010)

London Calling

- The New Sensation (2003)
- You're So Lucky (2004)

The Lost Days of Summer

- The Lost Days of Summer E.P. (2014)

Kalamity Kills

- Kalamity Kills (2023)

Contributions

- tobyMac - "Extreme Days" - songwriter
- Newsboys - "In The Hands of God" - backing vocals
- Petra - "Unseen Power" - backing vocals
- Petra - "Jekyll & Hyde" - backing vocals
- Sonic Flood - "This Generation" - backing vocals
- 7 Hours Later – "It's About Time" 2003 - Melodic Mayhem Records - guest vocalist
