= Eduard Uhl =

Mayor of Vienna (1813–1892)

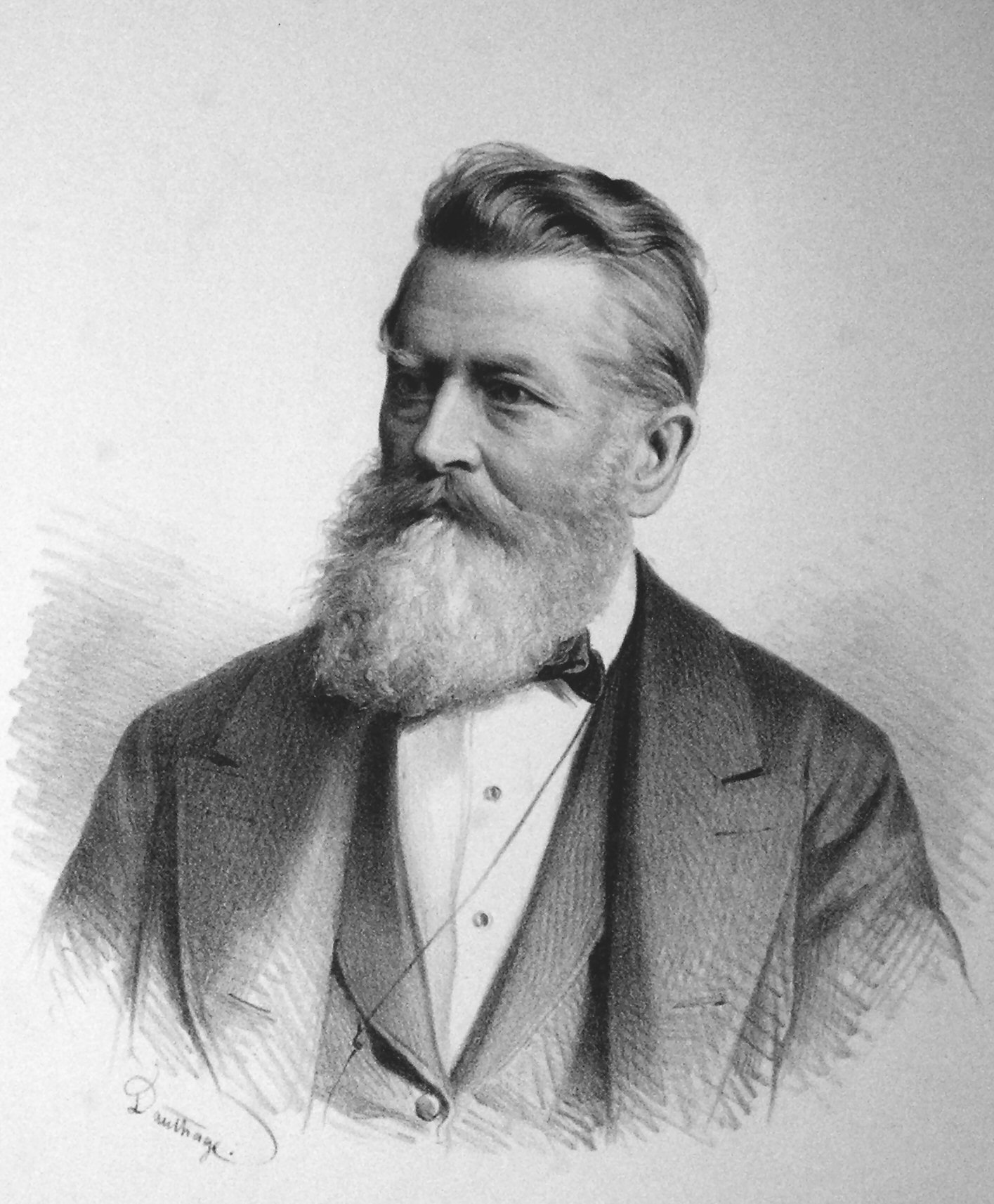

Mayor of Vienna
- In office 1882–1889
- Preceded by: Julius von Newald
- Succeeded by: Johann Prix

Personal details
- Born: 12 December 1813 Vienna, Austrian Empire
- Died: 1 November 1892 (aged 78) Vienna, Austria-Hungary

Eduard Uhl (12 December 1813 – 1 November 1892) was an Austrian politician who served as mayor of Vienna from 1882 to 1889.
