= Fight Fire with Fire (Kansas song) =

1983 single by Kansas

"Fight Fire With Fire"

Single by Kansas

from the album Drastic Measures
- B-side: "Incident on a Bridge"
- Released: August 1983
- Recorded: Early 1983
- Genre: Hard rock
- Length: 3:40
- Label: CBS Associated
- Songwriter(s): Dino Elefante, John Elefante
- Producer(s): Kansas, Neil Kernon

Kansas singles chronology
"Chasing Shadows" (1982)	"Fight Fire With Fire" (1983)	"Everybody's My Friend" (1983)

"Fight Fire with Fire" is a song by American band Kansas, written by John and Dino Elefante for the 1983 album Drastic Measures. Charting at No. 58 on the Billboard Hot 100, it became the twelfth Kansas single to chart on the Top 100. It was promoted with a music video starring Dan Shor, which was blown up to 35 mm film and displayed as a trailer in movie theaters.

The song was re-released on several compilation and live albums, including The Best of Kansas, The Ultimate Kansas, Sail On: The 30th Anniversary Collection, and the live CD/DVD combos Device, Voice, Drum and There's Know Place Like Home.

== Charts ==
Chart (1983)	Peak position
US Billboard Hot 100	58
US Mainstream Rock (Billboard)	3
