= Verneřice =

- Town
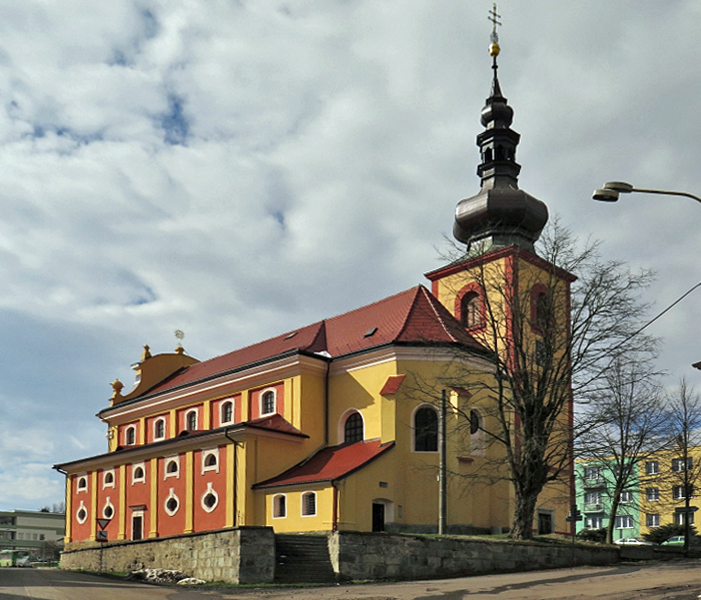
- Church of Saint Anne

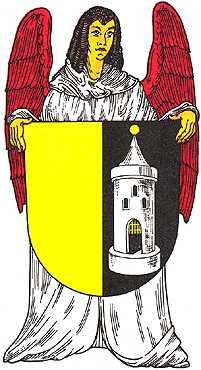
- Coat of arms

- Location in the Czech Republic
- Coordinates: 50°39′40″N 14°18′4″E
- Country: Czech Republic
- Region: Ústí nad Labem
- District: Děčín
- First mentioned: 1384

Government
  - Mayor: Roman Keznikl

Area
  - Total: 31.44 km^{2} (12.14 sq mi)
- Elevation: 493 m (1,617 ft)

Population (2026-01-01)
  - Total: 1,166
  - Density: 37.09/km^{2} (96.05/sq mi)
- Time zone: UTC+1 (CET)
  - Summer (DST): UTC+2 (CEST)
- Postal codes: 405 02, 407 25
- Website: www.vernerice.cz

Verneřice (Czech pronunciation: [ˈvɛrnɛr̝ɪtsɛ]; German: Wernstadt) is a town in Děčín District in the Ústí nad Labem Region of the Czech Republic. It has about 1,200 inhabitants. The town is located on the stream Bobří potok in the Central Bohemian Uplands.

== Administrative division ==
Verneřice consists of six municipal parts (in brackets population according to the 2021 census):

- Verneřice (878)
- Čáslav (8)
- Loučky (89)
- Příbram (73)
- Rychnov (94)
- Rytířov (32)

== Etymology ==
The original German name Wernstadt meant "Wern's town". The Czech name was created by transcription of the German name.

== Geography ==
Verneřice is located about 14 kilometres (9 mi) southeast of Děčín and 18 km (11 mi) east of Ústí nad Labem. It lies in the Central Bohemian Uplands. The highest point is the hill Buková hora at 683 m (2,241 ft) above sea level. The stream Bobří potok flows through the town. The entire municipal territory lies within the České středohoří Protected Landscape Area.

== History ==
The first written mention of Verneřice is from 1384. The settlement was probably founded in the second half of the 13th century. Verneřice was promoted to a market town in 1497. In 1522, it became a town.

The textile and shoe industry gradually developed in the town. The first cotton spinning mill in Bohemia was established here in 1707. In 1770, the entrepreneur J. J. Leitenberger founded a manufactory for fabric dyeing and in 1796 a spinning mill. In 1797, the first steam engine in Bohemia was imported to this spinning mill from England. In the 19th century there were already several spinning mills and a machine shop in the town. In the mid-19th century, lignite was mined in small mines near the town. At the beginning of the 20th century, industry declined and was replaced by agriculture.

== Demographics ==
Historical population

Year	Pop.	±%
1869	4,943	—
1880	5,063	+2.4%
1890	4,962	−2.0%
1900	4,751	−4.3%
1910	4,786	+0.7%

Year	Pop.	±%
1921	4,123	−13.9%
1930	3,953	−4.1%
1950	1,486	−62.4%
1961	1,271	−14.5%
1970	1,148	−9.7%

Year	Pop.	±%
1980	1,102	−4.0%
1991	1,074	−2.5%
2001	1,081	+0.7%
2011	1,089	+0.7%
2021	1,174	+7.8%

Source: Censuses

== Transport ==
There are no railways or major roads passing through the municipality.

== Sights ==
The main landmark of Verneřice is the Church of Saint Anne. Originally a Gothic church from the first half of the 14th century, it was rebuilt in the Baroque style in 1774–1776.

The former Leitenberger's manufactory is a Neoclassical building from 1796, protected as a cultural monument.

== Notable people ==
- Josef Strobach (1852–1905), politician, Mayor of Vienna
