= Buzz (Guardian album) =

Studio album by Guardian
- Released: October 1995
- Genre: Christian rock
- Length: 41:54
- Label: Myrrh
- Producer: Steve Taylor

Guardian chronology
Nunca te diré adiós (1994)	Buzz (1995)	Bottle Rocket (1997)

Singles from Buzz
- 1. "Lead the Way" Released: 1995

Professional ratings
Review scores
Source	Rating
Cross Rhythms	8/10

Buzz is one of the albums from Christian rock band Guardian. The album was released in October 1995 and was produced by Steve Taylor. The album takes the band into the realms of alternative music and grunge common of the 90s.

Guardian opened for Taylor in a tour which prompted them to ask him to produce their next album. Taylor was hesitant to do so at first, but then agreed as he became friends of the band.

== Track listing ==
1. "This Old Man" (Palacios, Rowe, Taylor) – 2:29
2. "Lead the Way" (Rowe, Taylor) – 2:43
3. "State of Mine" (Bach, Rowe) – 3:04
4. "The Lion's Den" (Palacios, Rowe, Taylor) – 3:54
5. "Are You Gonna Keep Your Word?" (Rowe, Taylor) – 3:34
6. "One Thing Left to Do" (Bach, Ney, Palacios, Rowe, Taylor) – 3:36
7. "Hand of the Father" (Bach, Palacios, Rowe) – 4:27
8. "Psychedelic Runaway" (Palacios) – 3:26
9. "Even It Out" (Bach, Palacios) – 3:55
10. "Lift Me Up" (Rowe) – 2:57
11. "Shorty" (Bach, Palacios) – 2:23
12. "Lullaby" (Bach) – 2:56
13. "Them Nails" (Bach, Palacios, Rowe) – 2:26

== Album artwork ==
The album slip featured four interchangeable covers. All of them references to the title Buzz. The four covers were:

- A picture of astronaut Buzz Aldrin.
- A close-up of a bee hive.
- A picture of two girls whispering between them (as in "buzzing").
- A picture of a mother giving a buzz cut haircut to her young son. Note: This picture is actually David Bach's mom giving his older brother a haircut.
Buzz Aldrin

Buzz cut

Buzz of a bee

== Personnel ==
Guardian

- Jamie Rowe – lead vocals, guitar on "Them Nails"
- Tony Palacios – guitars, backing vocals
- David Bach – bass, backing vocals
- Karl Ney – drums

Guest musicians

- Eric Darken – percussion
- John Mark Painter – string arrangements
- The Love Sponge String Quartet
  - John Catchings – cello
  - Kristin Wilkinson – viola
  - David Davidson – violin
  - Pamela Sixfin – violin

== Production ==
- Steve Taylor – producer
- Mark Maxwell – A&R direction
- Russ Long – engineer
- David Schober – additional engineer
- Rich Hanson – recording assistant
- Dave Latto – recording assistant
- Paul Skaife – recording assistant
- Rick Will – mixing
- F. Reid Shippen – mix assistant
- Bob Ludwig – mastering
- David Bach – art direction, design
- Jamie Rowe – design
- Stephen L. Buchmann – photography (bees)
- Black Box Studios – photography (whispering twins)
- NASA – photography (Buzz Aldrin)
- Commander H.E. Biedebach – photography (the haircut)

Studios

- Recorded at Quad Studios and The Carport (Nashville, Tennessee).
- Mixed at The Saltmine (Nashville, Tennessee).
- Mastered at Gateway Mastering (Portland, Maine).
