= Mastedon =

American Christian rock band

- Origin: Nashville/Davidson, Tennessee
- Genres: Christian rock, hard rock, rock
- Years active: 1987–present
- Labels: Regency, Pakaderm, Frontiers
- Past members: Dino Elefante; John Elefante; Dan Needham; Anthony Sallee; Dave Amato

Mastedon is a Christian rock band formed by brothers Dino and John Elefante (former lead singer and songwriter of Kansas) in the mid-1980s. The band was formed mainly as a studio project and have released three full-length albums and two stand-alone songs on compilation albums. Mastedon signed with Italian label Frontiers Records in 2009 and release Mastedon 3.

== History ==
The Mastedon "Wasn't It Love" song appeared on 1987 compilation California Metal, which featured tracks by up-and-coming white metal bands from California. The song was written by John and Dino Elefante and described by Cross Rhythms contributor Richard Clark as nascent "some kind of a classic". Mastedon appeared on the California Metal 2 compilation released next year with the song "Get Up". Clark opined that both songs are great examples of AOR music, "the kind of musical excellence that should be, but unfortunately isn't shown on all Christian rock/metal albums". Mastoden's debut, It's A Jungle Out There!, was release in 1989 and received positive reviews from Kerrang! and Metal Force. Clark singled out "Right Hand" as his favorite cut from the album.

== Discography ==
- "Wasn't It Love" from California Metal (1987)
- "Get Up" from California Metal II (1988)
- It's a Jungle Out There! (1989) Regency Records
- Lofcaudio (1990) Pakaderm Records
- 3 (2009) [Italy / same as Revolution of Mind (2010)]
- It's a Jungle Out There! 20th Anniversary Edition (2009) [re-release with three bonus tracks]
- Revolution of Mind (as 'John Elefante and Mastedon') (2010) [North America / same as 3 (2009)]
