= Hans von Friebeis =

Austrian politician (1855–1923)

Mayor of Vienna
- In office 1895–1896
- Preceded by: Raimund Grübl
- Succeeded by: Josef Strobach

Personal details
- Born: 24 July 1855 Bruck an der leitha, Austrian Empire
- Died: 25 October 1923 (aged 68) Gmunden, Austria

Hans von Friebeis (24 July 1855 — 25 October 1923) was a mayor of Vienna.
