= First Watch (album) =

Studio album by Guardian
- Released: 1989
- Recorded: 1989
- Genre: Christian metal
- Length: 49:07
- Label: Enigma
- Producer: Oz Fox

Guardian chronology
First Watch (1989)	Fire and Love (1990)

Singles from First Watch
- 1. "I'll Never Leave You" Released: 1989

First Watch is the first official album of Christian metal band Guardian. It was released in 1989 by Enigma Records and produced by Stryper's guitarist, Oz Fox.

This is the only album of the band (not including independent releases) to feature former members Paul Cawley (vocals) and Rikk Hart (drums). Both left the band after the tour supporting this album.

== Track listing ==
All songs written by Guardian, except where noted.

1. "I'll Never Leave You" - 4:31
2. "Mystery Man" - 4:07
3. "Livin' for the Promise" - 4:09
4. "Miracle" - 4:55
5. "Saints Battalion" - 3:46
6. "Kingdom of Rock" - 3:25
7. "The Good Life" - 4:41
8. "One of a Kind" (Guardian and Gene Thurston) - 3:32
9. "World Without Love" - 3:56
10. "Rock in Victory" - 3:49
11. "Hyperdrive" (Guardian and Mike Abbott) - 4:17
12. "Marching On" - 3:54

Tracks 11 and 12 were not featured in the original album or cassette.

== Personnel ==
Guardian

- Paul Cawley – lead vocals, guitars
- Tony Palacios – lead guitars, vocals
- David Bach – bass, vocals
- Rikk Hart – drums

Guest musicians

- Brent Jeffers – keyboards
- Oz Fox – backing vocals, guitar solo (11)
- Leslie Fox – backing vocals (7)
- Robert Sweet – backing vocals (11)

== Production ==
- Oz Fox – producer, mixing
- Dan Nebenzal – engineer, mixing
- Mike Mierau – mixing, assistant engineer
- Dino Elefante – assistant engineer, studio coordinator
- Gene Eugene – assistant engineer
- Dave Hackbarth – assistant engineer, studio coordinator
- Allen Isaacs – assistant engineer
- Jeff Simmons – assistant engineer
- Eddy Schreyer – mastering
- Paula Salvatore – studio coordinator
- Dean Van Eimeren – art direction, design
- Steve Cooper – photography
- Maria Armoudian – management
- Jeff Gordon – management

Studios

- Recorded at Sound City Studios (Van Nuys, California); Pakaderm Studios (Los Alamitos, California); Nevermore; Foxhole.
- Mixed at Pakaderm Studios
- Mastered at Capitol Mastering (Hollywood, California).
