= Josef Strobach =

Austrian politician (1852–1905)

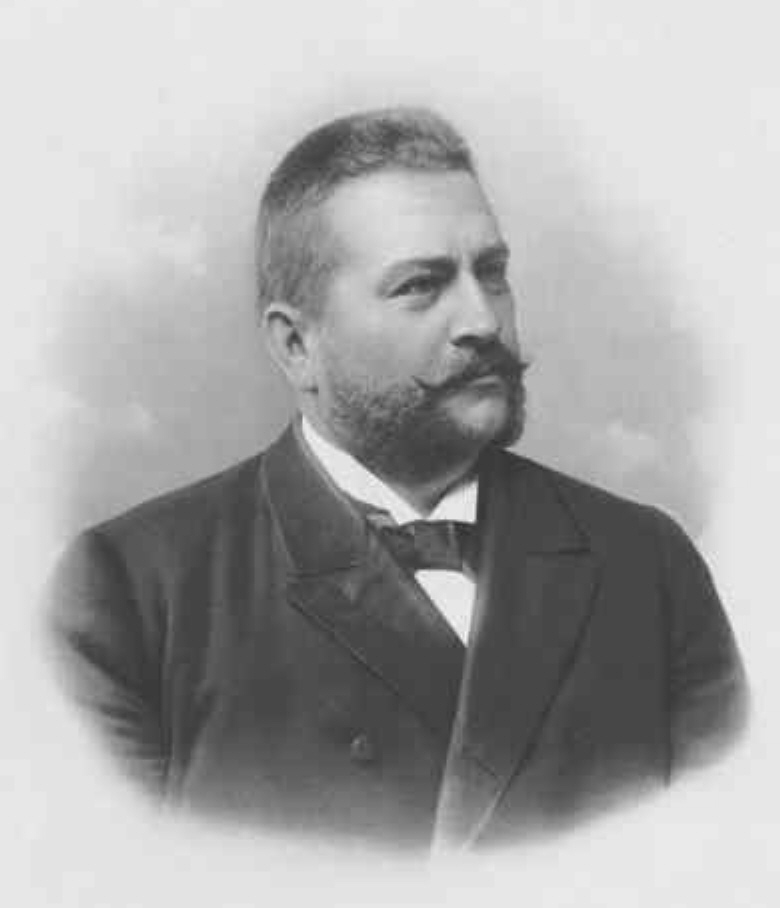
- Josef Strobach

Mayor of Vienna
- In office 1896–1897
- Preceded by: Hans von Friebeis
- Succeeded by: Karl Lueger

Personal details
- Born: 23 December 1852 Wernstadt, Bohemia, Austrian Empire
- Died: 11 May 1905 (aged 52) Vienna, Austria-Hungary
- Resting place: Vienna Central Cemetery
- Party: Christian Social Party

Josef Strobach (23 December 1852 – 11 May 1905) was an Austrian bookseller and politician, the Mayor of Vienna.
