= Raimund Grübl =

Austrian lawyer, politician and mayor of Vienna (1847–1898)

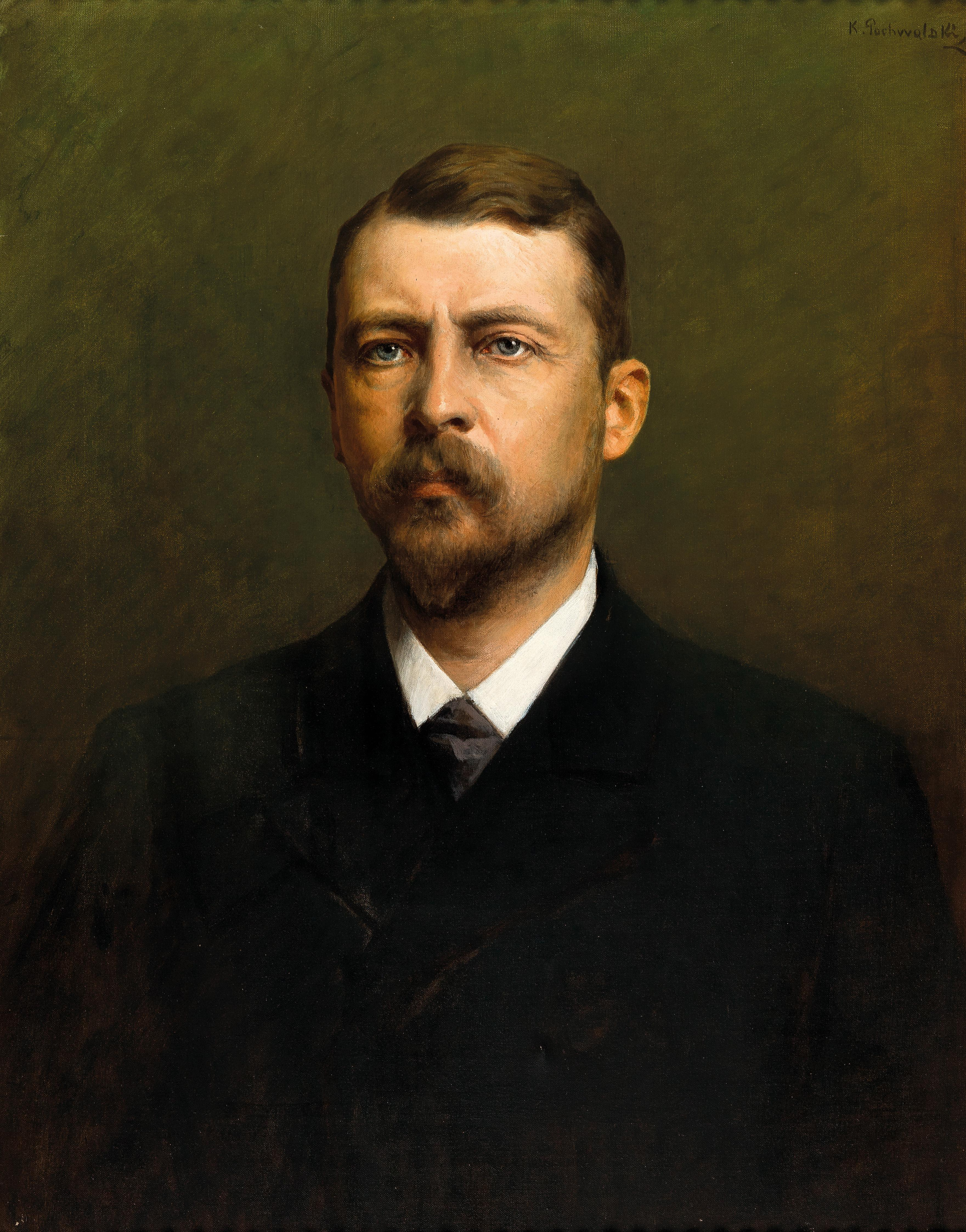
- Raimund Grübl, undated

Mayor of Vienna
- In office 1894–1895
- Preceded by: Johann Prix
- Succeeded by: Hans von Friebeis

Personal details
- Born: 12 August 1847 Vienna, Austrian Empire
- Died: 12 May 1898 (age 50) Vienna, Austria-Hungary
- Profession: lawyer

Raimund Grübl (12 August 1847, Vienna – 12 May 1898, Vienna) was an Austrian lawyer and mayor of Vienna from 1894 to 1895. He is regarded as the last liberal mayor of the city.

Grübl attended to Akademisches Gymnasium in Vienna.
