= Julius von Newald =

Austrian politician (1824–1897)

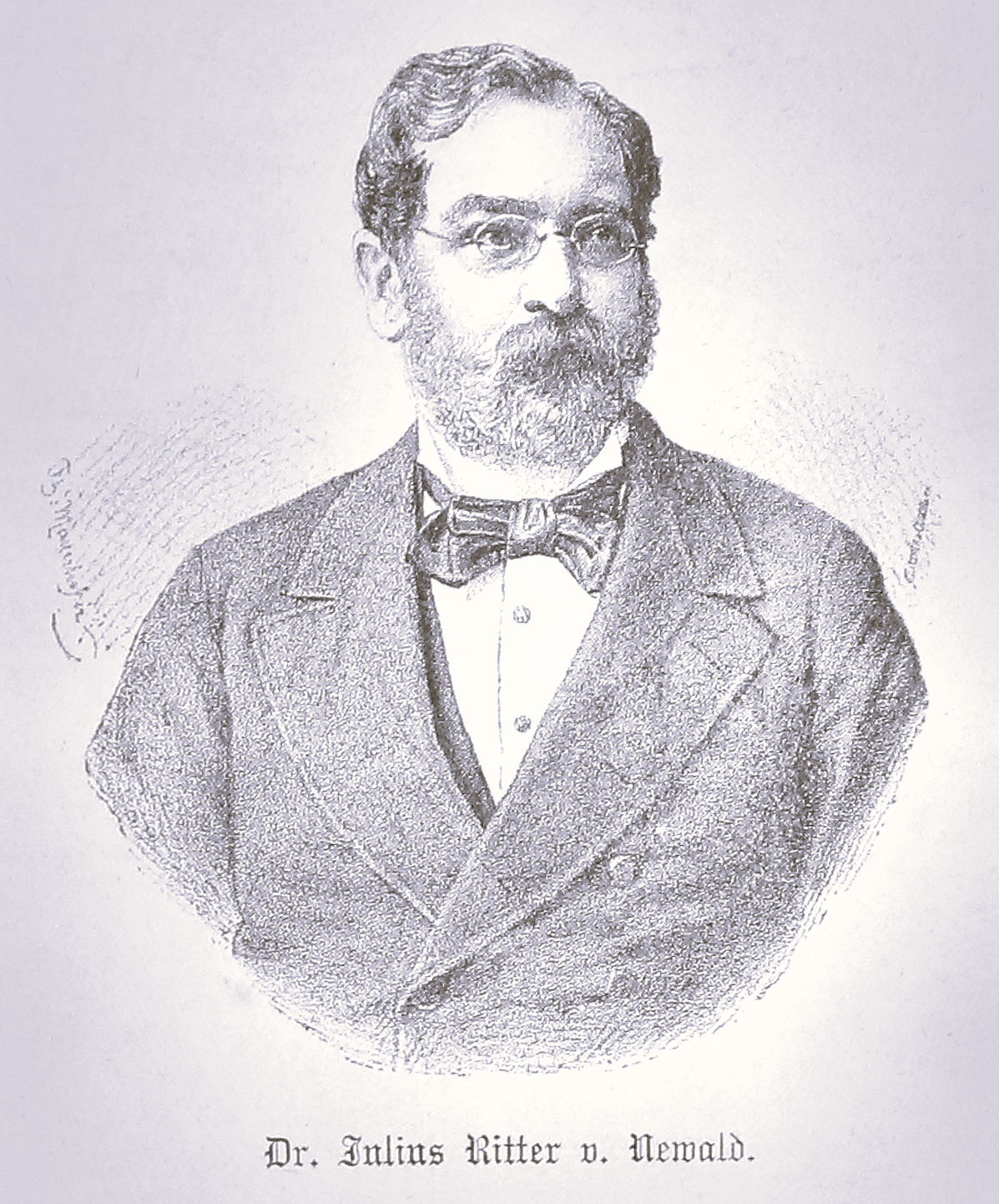

Mayor of Vienna
- In office 1878–1882
- Preceded by: Cajetan von Felder
- Succeeded by: Eduard Uhl

Personal details
- Born: 11 April 1824; Neutitschein, Moravia, Austrian Empire
- Died: 17 August 1897 (aged 72); Vienna, Austria-Hungary

Julius von Newald (April 11, 1824 – August 17, 1897) was an Austrian politician who served as mayor of Vienna from 1878 to 1882.
