= Carl Geyling's Erben =

Austrian stained glass manufacturer

Carl Geyling's Erben is a traditional Austrian stained glassmaker. The company has its headquarters in Vienna.

== History ==
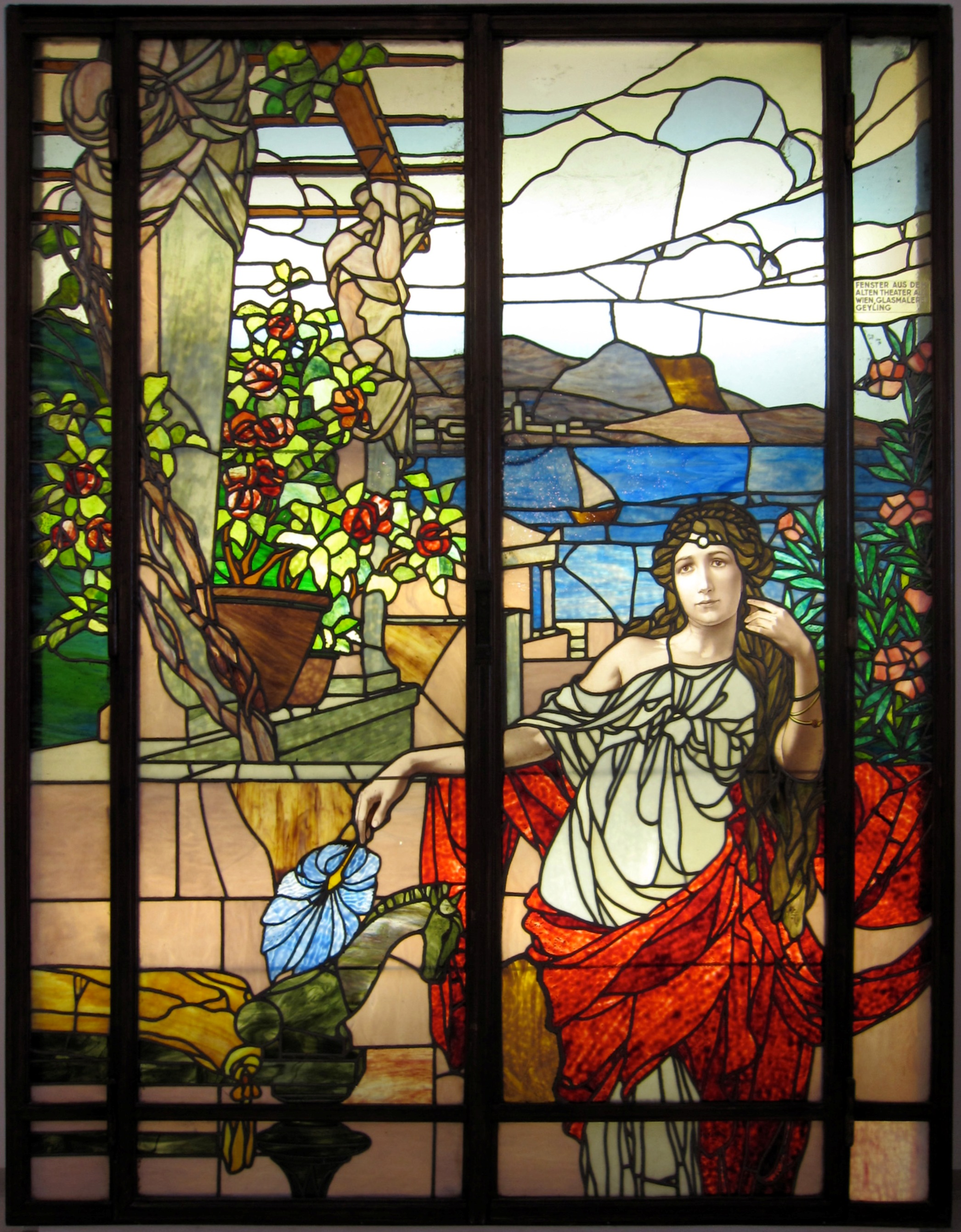
Stained glass window by Carl Geyling's Erben, made around 1900 for the old Theater an der Wien

It is one of the oldest businesses still extant in Austria and one of the oldest in its field. It was founded in 1841 by the stained glass artist Carl Geyling (1814–1880). Geyling became very successful in his field and expanded his business. His name became known outside the Austrian empire.

The company has received many commissions for public and private buildings. The owners also received an imperial warrant and became Purveyors to the Imperial and Royal Court.

Carl Geyling's Erben also worked closely together with artists of the Wiener Werkstätte, such as Josef von Führich and Koloman Moser.
