= Johann Nepomuk Prix =

Austrian politician (1836–1894)

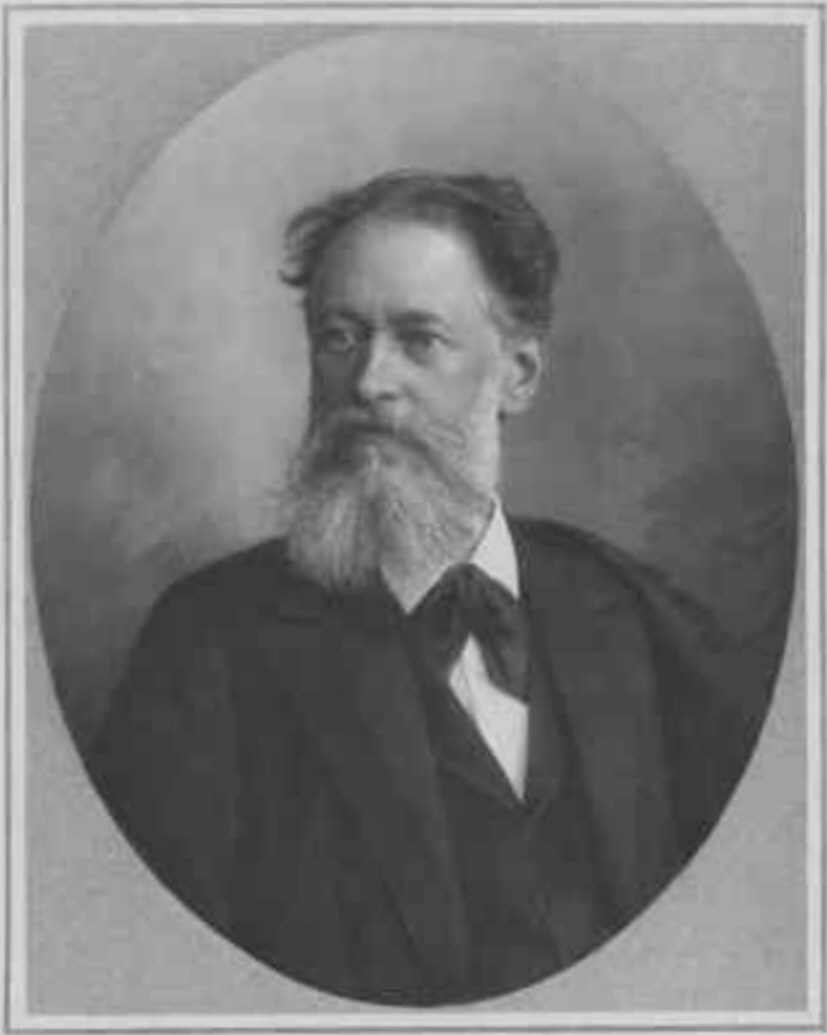
- WP Johann Nepomuk Prix

Mayor of Vienna
- In office 1889–1894
- Preceded by: Eduard Uhl
- Succeeded by: Raimund Grübl

Personal details
- Born: 1826 Vienna
- Died: 1894 (aged 67–68)

Johann Nepomuk Prix (1826 in Vienna – 1894) was a mayor of Vienna.
