= David Ernst Oppenheim =

Austrian psychologist (1881–1943)

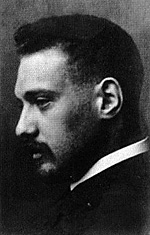
- Born: 20 April 1881; Brno, Moravia, Austria-Hungary
- Died: 18 February 1943 (aged 61); Theresienstadt Ghetto, Terezín, Protectorate of Bohemia and Moravia
- Education: Akademisches Gymnasium; University of Vienna
- Relatives: Peter Singer (grandson)

David Ernst Oppenheim (German: [ˈɔpənhaɪm]; 20 April 1881 – 18 February 1943) was an Austrian educator and psychologist who collaborated with Sigmund Freud and Alfred Adler.

== Biography ==
David Ernst Oppenheim was born in Brno, Moravia, in Austria-Hungary, to a Jewish family, and educated at the University of Vienna where he studied philology and archaeology, graduating in 1904. He worked as a professor of Greek and Latin at the Akademisches Gymnasium in Vienna, and was interested in the ancient history and mythology.

Around 1909 he contacted Sigmund Freud, and in January 1910 was accepted as a member of the Vienna Psychoanalytic Association where he gave talks on the fire as a sexual symbol and on suicides at school age. Together with Freud, he wrote a manuscript entitled “Dreams in Folklore” in 1911 which was only published in 1958, because Oppenheim left the Association and instead joined the school of Individual Psychology of Alfred Adler in 1911. Oppenheim had an important position within the new school, and he wrote several articles in the Internationale Zeitschrift für Individualpsychologie.

Oppenheim took part in World War I at the Italian front but later became a pacifist and an active member in the Social Democratic Party of Austria.

In 1938, when Austria was annexed to Nazi Germany, Oppenheim was expelled from the school in which he had taught for decades, because he was Jewish, and therefore "Untermensch", or inferior. He and his wife intended to emigrate to Australia where their daughters lived, but because of his diabetes they were not able to make the trip. In 1942, he and his wife Amalie were transported to the concentration camp in Terezín where he died in 1943, because he was not given the insulin-based medication that would have kept him alive. After World War II, his widow was able to go and be with their children in Melbourne with a part of his archives.

== Bibliography ==
- Oppenheim, D. E. (1926). Dichtung und Menschenkenntnis: Psychologische Streifzüge durch alte und neue Literatur (in German). München: Bergmann.
- Freud, Sigmund; Oppenheim, David Ernst (1958). Strachey, James (ed.). Dreams in Folklore (in English and German). Translated by A. M. O. Richards. New York: International Universities Press.

== Sources ==
- Mühlleitner, Elke, ed. (1992). Biographisches Lexikon der Psychoanalyse: Die Mitglieder der Psychologischen Mittwoch-Gesellschaft und der Wiener Psychoanalytischen Vereinigung 1902–1938 (in German). pp. 239–240. ISBN 3-89295-557-3.
- Singer, Peter (2003). Pushing Time Away: My Grandfather and the Tragedy of Jewish Vienna. Pymble (N.S.W): Fourth Estate. ISBN 0-7322-7742-6.
