= Miki Malör =

Austrian theatre creator and performance artist (born 1957)

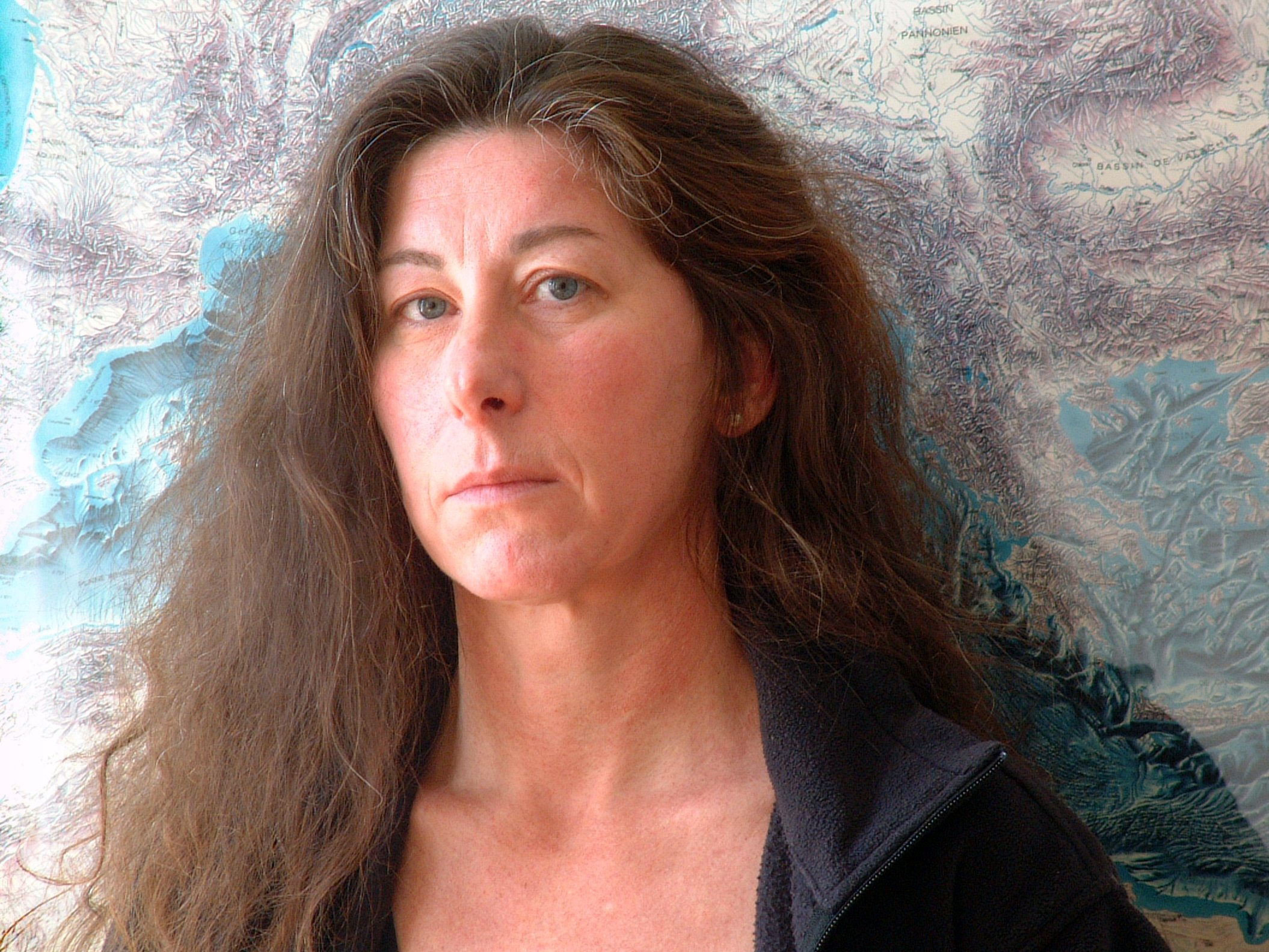
- Vienna, June 2007
- Born: Michaela Satzke; 29 August 1957 (age 68); Vienna, Austria
- Occupations: performance artist, stage director, actor, singer
- Years active: 1982–present
- Website: maloer.org/index.en.htm

Miki Malör (born 29 August 1957) is an Austrian theatre creator, director and performance artist.

== Life ==
Miki Malör studied music at the music and art academy in Vienna (MA, 1981). In addition, over the years she also had the following training: massage diploma (1994), Open Water Scuba Instructor (PADI 1995) and cave diver (NACD 1997).

Her beginnings as pianist and stage musician in cabaret and theatre performances, and as clownish singer with the rock theatre group de:Hallucination Company (1982/83) were followed by twelve years of solo tours through Europe. Characteristic for this period is the term "Comic Theatre" for her works and her declining to be catalogued as Kabarett artist. In 1986 she was awarded the Förderpreis der Stadt Mainz on occasion of the awards for the de:Deutscher Kleinkunstpreis.

Since 1995, she has abandoned cabaret and radicalised her works. The next stage were performances, installations and post-dramatic theatre. Apart from working on her own pieces, she frequently directs off-theatre productions. Miki Malör regularly produces in Vienna.

== Works ==
Miki Malör's works elude unilateral attributions: they are inspired by the avant-gardes of the 20th century, postmodern, deconstructivist, subversive, alternative, experimental, post-dramatic, feminist, rhizomatic, sensual, absurd, highly comical, intimate, transgressing taboos, excessive, and much more. Her works are neither based on drama pieces, nor are they meta-narrations, and there are no actors impersonating roles. She exclusively realises her own pieces and favours working with performers, dancers, and laypersons. Another mark of her works is her special attachment to music; her frequent trade with objects indicates a close relationship with the fine arts.

The bandwidth of her themes is extensive: one underwater piece ("Vampyroteuthis Infernalis"), two Schubert cycles ("Transit", "Prey"), "Veiling. A (Social) Game", "Hysteria!", "nationalANTHEMS” and the cult film remake "The Attack of the 50 Foot Woman".

Many of her pieces focus on female desire (e.g., "Desire As Will To Be Trapped", as well as the ongoing performance cycle "Anima"). These more and more often result in cross-genre film works ("Interior Design").

Miki Malör's theatre is fed by philosophical and depth psychological theories, the last results of which were some works on Deleuze/Guattari about the theme of Desiring Machines ("The Lady Who Ate 100 Cakes", "Tigerbalm", "100 Objects to Represent Theatre"). These works can be read as an attempt at interpreting the unconscious as a model of incessant and unfettered productivity. This leads to machines, fabrics, tableaux of desire, vestal machines of subversion, where Miki Malör's analytic background is embedded in passion, risk, and touch. Instead of representation, the impersonation on stage, there is doing, pure productivity which replaces psychological play with a radical language of images free for association.

Miki Malör has been working together with stage director Miguel Ángel Gaspar for several years.

=== Theatre / performance art (selection) ===
- Anima (Cycle, 1996–present)
  - Honey (1996)
  - Standing Up (1997)
  - Decompression Stop (1997)
  - Titi Ikoli (1998)
- Transit (after Schubert's "Winter Journey", 1998/99)
- Vampyroteuthis infernalis (an underwater piece, 1999)
- Gretchen's Plait (continuous performance, 1999/2000)
- Prey (after Schubert's "The Fair Maid of the Mill", 2000)
- "us" (60-day performance series, 2001)
- VEILING. A (Social) Game (a theatrical installation about intimacy in public, 2001)
- Desire As The Will To Be Trapped (two pieces, one book, 2003/04)
- Hysteria! A Subversive Practise (six persons in six rotating chambers, 2004)
- nationalANTHEMS (a piece for one performer, one choir, one Viennese electronics DJ, and one pop theoretician, 2005)
- The Lady Who Ate 100 Cakes (a duo in two territories, 2006)
- The Attack of the 50 Foot Woman (a guided tour through the remake of the 1950s cult classic, 2007)
- MATILDA (a one-on-one performance, 2008)
- TIGERBALM (A silent movie live on stage, 2008)
- 100 Objects to Represent Theatre (2009)
- The Love of Maggots (Cleansing. Skinning. Dialogue. 2010)

=== Film ===
- Currency (directed by Emre Tunçer, 2004)
- Interior Design (with Michael Strohmann and Yosi Wanunu, 2007)
