= Markus Kupferblum =

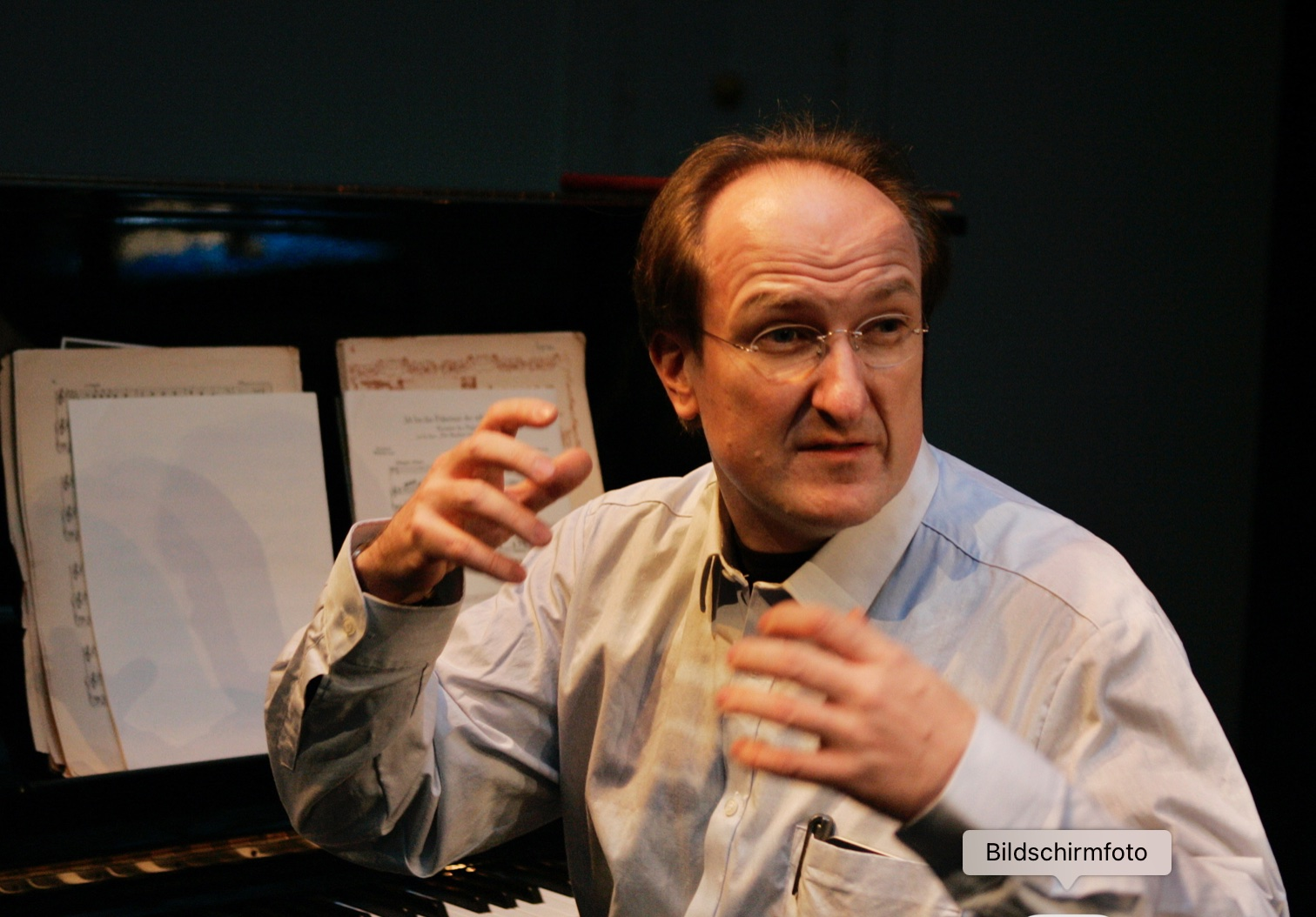
- Kupferblum in 2007
- Born: 12 June 1964 (age 62); Vienna, Austria
- Occupations: stage director, actor, clown
- Years active: 1984–present
- Website: kupferblum.com

Markus Kupferblum (born 12 June 1964) is an Austrian theatre and opera director, playwright and clown. He founded the first Austrian Fringe Opera Company, Totales Theater, in Vienna and is an expert on commedia dell'arte and mask theatre.

He studied at the University of Vienna, under Philippe Gaulier at École Philippe Gaulier and with Monika Pagneux in Paris, and at New York University. He was assistant to Antoine Vitez and Achim Freyer.

Since 2013, he has been the founder and director of the interdisciplinary music theatre ensemble Schlüterwerke in Vienna.

He has directed and shown productions in France, Austria, Germany, England, Spain, Belgium, the United States of America, Korea, Armenia, Lebanon, Iran, Israel, Russia, Lithuania, Luxemburg, Peru, Turkey, Switzerland, and Italy.

He was awarded the "1. Prix de l'Humour" at the Avignon Festival in 1993 and is known for working across the genres of opera, circus, theatre, and film and exploring unusual performance spaces for his productions.

In 2007 he received the Nestroy Theatre Prize for the best German-language fringe production for his play The Abandoned Dido.

2019 he received the Operetta Award "Operetten Frosch" by the Bavarian National Radio for his production of the Operetta Cloclo by Franz Lehár.

In 2012 he founded the European Theatre Day of Tolerance which is commemorated on every 1 February. On this occasion a Memorandum for peace and tolerance is read before the performances of almost 1,000 theaters throughout Europe and beyond.

In 2013 his book Die Geburt der Neugier aus dem Geist der Revolution. Die Commedia dell'Arte als politisches Volkstheater was published by Facultas, Vienna University Press.

In 2023 his book The Beauty of Helena - A Guide to the Art of Acting was published in a bilingual, German and English, edition at Verlag Der Apfel, Vienna, Austria

He has taught acting, directing and creative writing at, for example, the University of Vienna, Max Reinhardt Seminar, University of Music and Performing Arts (Vienna), University of Applied Arts (Vienna), Rutgers University, Michigan University, Southeastern Louisiana University, Yale University, New Haven, Columbia University und der CUNY University, both in New York City, Harvard University and the New England Conservatory in Boston, the Hochschule für Musik und Darstellende Kunst Frankfurt, Theaterakademie August Everding München, Escuela Nacional del Teatro de Bolivia, and others.

Since 2018 he has been Senior Lecturer at the University of Music and Performing Arts, Vienna, where he teaches opera directing and drama for singers.

He is a member of the International P.E.N. Club.
