= Guardian (band) =

American Christian hard rock/metal band

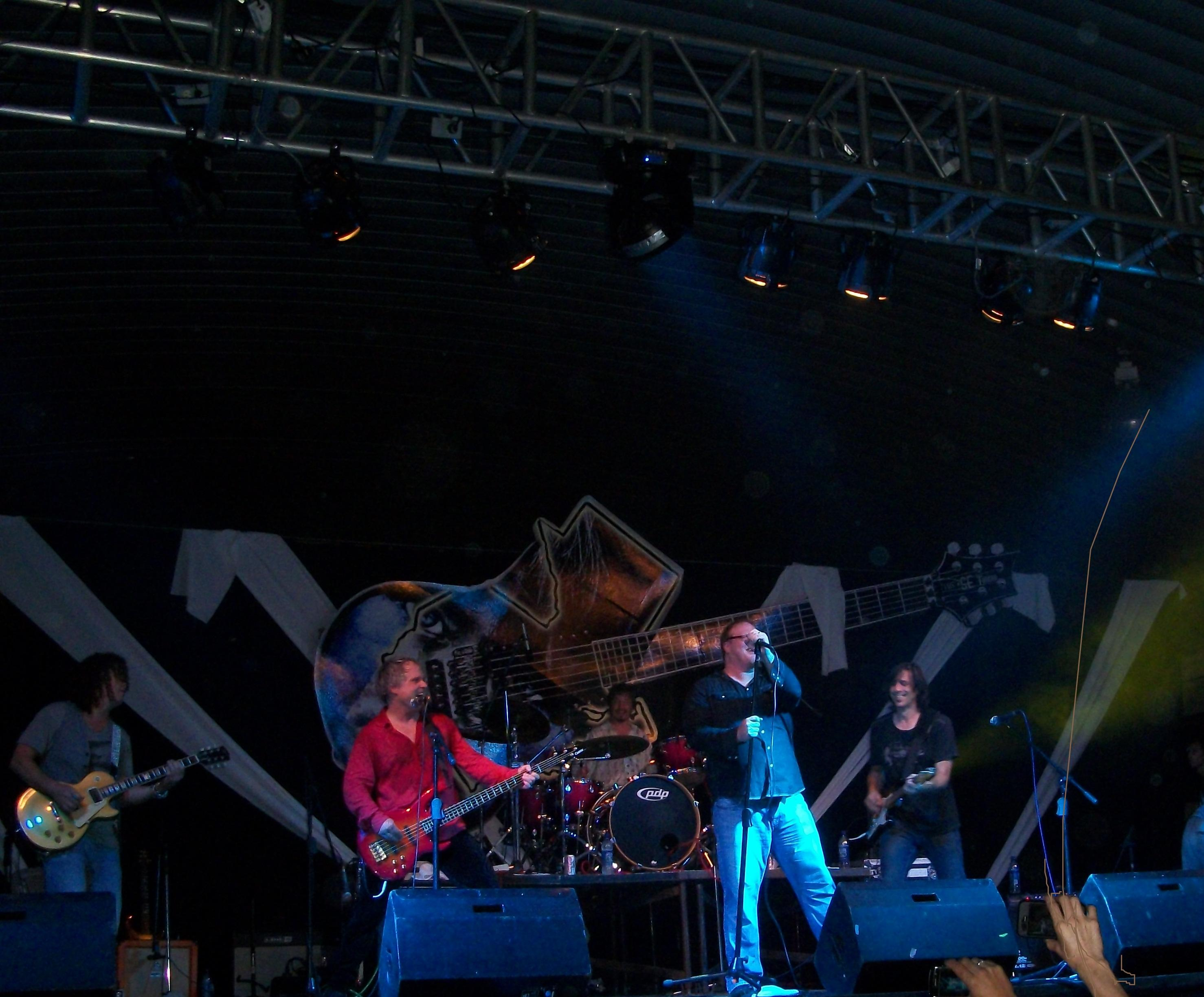
- Guardian in concert in 2011

Background information
- Origin: Los Angeles, California
- Genres: Hard rock; Christian rock; Christian metal
- Years active: 1982–present
- Labels: Enigma, Pakaderm, Myrrh
- Members: David Bach; Tony Palacios; Jamie Rowe; Karl Ney
- Past members: Paul Cawley; Rikk Hart; Jamey Perrenot; James Isham; David Caro
- Website: www.facebook.com/Houseofguardian

Guardian is an American Christian hard rock and metal band. The band has released seven studio albums, three additional albums in Spanish, and toured extensively worldwide. There are also numerous compilations, independent releases, live records and bootlegs available.

== History ==
=== The early years ===
The band was founded in 1982 under the name Fusion, by bassist David Bach and singer, songwriter and guitarist Paul Cawley. The original band lineup included drummer Steve Martinez and guitarist Gene Thurston. The group stood out in the burgeoning Los Angeles metal music scene due to their unconventional futuristic body-armor stage outfits, whose concept Cawley derived from the biblical passage in Ephesians 6 regarding "putting on the full armor of God". Member changes in 1984 included drummer Rikk Hart and guitarist, James Isham. In late 1984, Isham departed, and the trio of Cawley, Bach & Hart recorded an EP of six Cawley-penned tunes called Rock in Victory. During early 1985, the band experimented with some pop textures and were temporarily joined by keyboardist Brent Jeffers and vocalist Pat Dewey, who left shortly thereafter to form a band called The Deacons. After much searching, Cawley, Bach & Hart recruited guitarist David Caro. Caro arrived just in time for one of the first of many shifts in the band's trajectory.

The band managed to strike a record deal with Enigma Records in 1985, after Hart's high school friend, Eric Blair, (who worked for the Christian metal band Stryper) pitched the Rock in Victory EP to Enigma Records President, Wesley Hein. When they found out there was a Spanish band also going by the name Fusion, they changed the band name to Gardian – intentionally misspelled to have 7 letters. In early 1986, Caro left the band and was replaced by guitarist Tony Palacios. With Palacios, there surfaced a bootleg EP, Voyager in 1987—which were really just pre-production demos recorded in the backroom of an Orange County music store.

In 1988, the band abandoned the space armor and added the "U" to their name—while continually touring throughout California and recording demos for their record label. In 1989, Enigma/Capitol finally released their first official album, First Watch, produced by Stryper's Oz Fox. This release featured a melodic metal sound in a similar vein as Stryper or Van Halen and was followed by extensive touring through the United States and Japan. Rikk Hart departed the group in the fall of 1989 and was replaced by drummer Jason Souza for the Japanese tour. Souza was then recruited by John Alderete and John Corabi for the original lineup of The Scream and was replaced by drummer Karl Ney. In early 1990, founding member Cawley left the band.

=== The new Guardian ===
After Cawley's departure, Bach and Palacios asked to be freed of their Enigma contract, requesting a more Christian-focused label. After they were released, former Tempest singer Jamie Rowe joined the band. The new band lineup started working with new producers Dino and John Elefante on their second album, finally releasing Fire and Love in 1991 on Epic Records through the Elefante's Pakaderm label imprint. The response to the album was overwhelming and the video for the song "Power of Love" was included in the MTV's Headbangers Ball rotation. After extensive U.S touring throughout 1991 and a European tour with Stryper in 1992, the band released their third album, Miracle Mile in 1993. The album was a departure from their first two releases as the band began to integrate R&B and acoustic elements into their music. The album quickly rose the charts, and reached the CCM Top Five.

After a new record deal with Myrrh Records, they followed with an experimental acoustic album Swing, Swang, Swung in 1994. The album was recorded in producer's (John & Dino Elefante) garage and featured a stripped down, blues based sound. Also, the band's first Spanish album Nunca te diré adiós (I Will Never Say Goodbye) was released in 1995—rising the band's popularity in Latin America.

The band then switched to veteran Christian producer/artist Steve Taylor, after sharing the bill with Taylor on his worldwide Squinternational tour. Under his direction they returned to a harder sound and released Buzz in 1995. They supported the release with yet another worldwide tour—including extensive dates in Latin America. In 1997, the band released the Taylor-produced Bottle Rocket and their second Spanish album, Promesa (Promise).

With growing shifts in the Christian rock genre and their ever-growing families (Note: Palacios has six children. Bach, Ney and Rowe have four children each, for a total of 18), the band decided to take some time off from their grueling tour schedule and dedicate time to other personal projects. During this time, Bach temporarily stepped down as a full-time touring member and the band released a self-produced tribute to Stryper called The Yellow and Black Attack Is Back!. The album is a direct remake of Stryper's The Yellow and Black Attack. The band continued to play dates in the U.S. and abroad with touring bassist Brent Denny. In early 2001, Rowe, Palacios and Ney released a third Spanish album called Dime. It featured nine songs written in Spanish exclusively for this album and one in English.

=== The later years ===
In mid-2001, Guardian (including Bach) joined other legendary Christian hard rock bands (including Bride) on the HM Stage at the Cornerstone Festival near Bushnell, Illinois. The show was intended to be a tribute to the Christian metal heyday of the 80s and early 90s, however Guardian made the show a reunion of sorts and performed songs spanning their entire catalog.

In December 2005, the band recorded an updated version of "Never Say Goodbye" with producer Phil Madeira.

Guardian in Argentina 2011.

In April 2006, producer Dino Elefante told Jesus Freak Hideout that Guardian would release Triple Five, a compilation with some new songs on the Selectric Records imprint that he had partnered with Bach. Jamie Rowe said that there may be a complete CD of all new material rather than Triple Five. However, these plans were put on hold when Selectric Records was sold to Weston Entertainment.

In October 2006, Guardian made a rare live appearance at the ARPA Awards in Mexico City where they performed a medley of some of their Spanish hits.

In February 2007, Guardian joined fellow Christian-metal veterans, Bride and Tourniquet onstage in Germany at the Legends of Rock festival.

In December 2008, the band appeared at Rock & Vida in Buenos Aires, Argentina—playing before over 100,000 with newly added guitarist Jamey Perrenot.

In 2009, the band released House of Guardian—a live video documentary—as well as a complementary website: houseofguardian.com

Guardian again appeared in Europe at the Legends of Rock festival in Germany in 2010 with Perrenot solely handling all guitar duties.

The band appeared live in a series of Latin American shows in Guatemala, Argentina and Paraguay in 2011.

In early 2012, the band successfully funded a new recording though crowd sourcing. The album was christened Almost Home the day after the funding was successful.

In 2017, Guardian members Jamie Rowe (Vocals) and David Bach (Bass) partnered with Whitecross members Rex Carroll (Guitar) and Michael Feighan (Drums) to record an EP that included both Guardian and Whitecross songs. The resultant album release was entitled "Revival" and was released under the band name "The Great Whitecross & Guardian" Most notable was a remake of the Whitecross classic "Enough is Enough" as well as a cover of Jimi Hendrix "Spanish Castle Magic".

In 2019, the core Guardian line up of Rowe, Palacios, Bach & Ney reunited for a live performance and interviews for the TV show, Music Moments and Memories, which aired on the TBN network.

=== Post-Guardian ===
After the band went on semi-hiatus in the late 90s, bassist David Bach served as VP of A&R for five years with EMI's ForeFront Records. He also served in the same capacity for Sony/BMG-owned Reunion Records before reuniting with veteran producers John and Dino Elefante to serve as label chief in a production/record company called 3.1 Productions, which included the Selectric Records imprint that Bach solely oversaw.

Bach currently works for Apple Inc., overseeing Business Development for key markets in the southeast U.S.

Guitarist Tony Palacios mixes and produces records for a diverse blend of both CCM and mainstream acts.

Karl Ney is owner of The Bennett Company, an Artist and Business Management Firm which represents international CCM and mainstream recording artists

Jamie Rowe remains active as both solo artist with several solo albums plus band projects for power pop bands London Calling and The Ruled as well as melodic rock band AdrianGale. He also works as a part-time youth minister while running a successful viral marketing business. He is currently Marketing Director for the musical equipment company, Visual Sound. Rowe released his first country album, This is Home, in 2019.

Jamey Perrenot is a record producer/session guitarist in Nashville, TN.

Former guitarist David Caro currently plays guitar at his church in Hesperia, CA.

Former guitarist James Isham currently lives in Germany and performs under the name Jimi James.

Early band advocate Eric Blair currently hosts his own cable-TV music show in Southern California called the Blairing Out Show.

Former keyboardist Brent Jeffers later played keyboards with Stryper and has toured the world over with a diverse group of artists ranging from Natalie Cole to Tim McGraw. He has served as keyboard tech for the band Journey since 2002.

In 2011, Guardian founder Paul Cawley and former drummer Rikk Hart released a three-song EP called "Empire", under the band name Guardian 1.

== Band members ==
Current

- David Bach – bass (1982–present)
- Tony Palacios – guitar (1986–present)
- Jamie Rowe – vocals (1990–present)
- Karl Ney – drums (1990–present)

Former

- Paul Cawley – vocals, guitar (1982–1990)
- Gene Thurston – guitar (1983)
- James Isham – guitar (1983–1984)
- David Caro – guitar (1985–1986)
- Steve Martinez – drums (1982–1983)
- Rikk Hart – drums (1984–1989)
- Brent Jeffers – keyboards (1985)
- Pat Dewey – vocals (1985)
- Jason Souza – drums (1989)
- Brent Denny – bass (1998–2000)
- Jamey Perrenot – guitar (2008–2016)

Touring musicians

- Tracie Ferrie – bass
- Pete Orta – guitar

Timeline

== Discography ==
=== Studio ===
- First Watch (1989)
- Fire and Love (1991)
- Miracle Mile (1993)
- Swing, Swang, Swung (1994)
- Buzz (1995)
- Bottle Rocket (1997)
- Almost Home (2014)

=== Live ===
- Live (2000)

=== Compilations ===
- Smashes: The Best of Guardian (1999)
- Guardian: The Definitive Collection (2007)

=== Spanish albums ===
- Nunca te diré adiós (1995)
- Promesa (1997)
- Dime (2001)
- La Casa de Guardian: Volumen Uno (2009)

=== Independent releases ===
- Rock In Victory (1984)
- Kingdom of Rock (1996)
- Delicious Bite-Size Meat Pies (1997)
- The Yellow and Black Attack Is Back! (1999, Reviews: HM Magazine, The Phantom Tollbooth)
- Sunday Best (1999, Review: HM Magazine)
- Live! (1999 Review: HM Magazine Later issued with two fewer tracks in 2000 by Forefront Records.)
- Live at Cornerstone (2001)
- Voyager and Fusion: The Early Years (2001)
- House of Guardian: Volume One (2009)
- Three to Get Ready (EP) (2011)
- Revival: The Great Whitecross & Guardian (EP) (2017)

=== Video releases ===
- Streets of Fire (1993)
- As Seen on TV (1995)
