= David Josef Bach =

Austrian journalist (1874–1947)

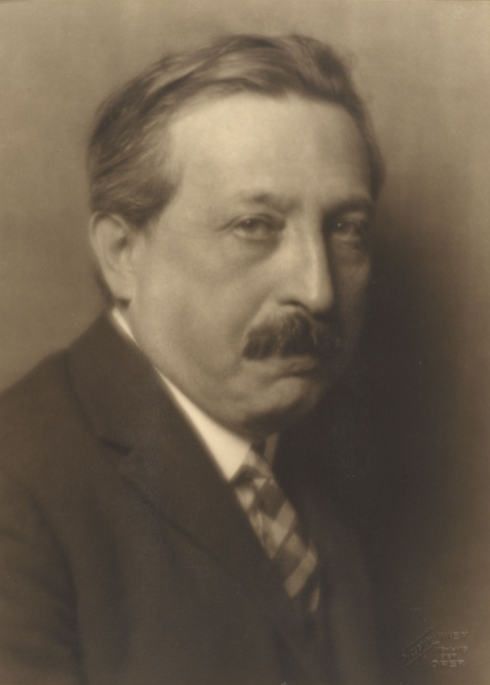
David Josef Bach

David Josef Bach (13 August 1874 – 30 January 1947) was an Austrian arts journalist, music critic, and influential figure in the cultural life of early twentieth-century Vienna, especially Red Vienna. He was part of the Austrian workers' movement and a member of the Social Democratic Workers' Party of Austria.

== Upbringing in Imperial Vienna ==
David Josef Bach was born on August 13, 1874 in Lviv (then Lemberg, Austrian Galicia) to Jewish parents married there in 1870: Eduard (b. 1846, Vienna) and Henriette (née Nelken, b. 1846, Lemberg). His siblings Max (b. 1871), Eveline, Martin, and Benno were born in Vienna. His mother was likely visiting home, perhaps due to the Panic of 1873, when she gave birth to him.

In Lehmanns Wohnungsanzeiger, Eduard was listed at Schreygasse 12b as a bookkeeper, perhaps for his wife's family business, where he may have previously worked as a clerk. The family changed apartments in Leopoldstadt, historically a Jewish ghetto: he was next listed as a hatmaker at Kaiser-Franz-Straße 30 in 1882 and at Pazmanitengasse 3 in 1883. By 1893, his widow was likely supporting her school-aged children, aided by relatives, with a dry goods store.

Bach played piano but regretted a late start. He followed Max into the Akademisches Gymnasium in 1884, where he read Felix Dahn, Georg Ebers, Gustav Freytag, and Joseph Victor von Scheffel. He recalled its clerical conservativism—a history professor bristled at Josephinism—amid "yellow" (liberal or anti-clerical) hegemony. He described his peers as mostly Jewish boys who first learned to support the pope but then, later, (pan-)German nationalism. Still, he wrote, they cared more about Burgtheater matinees than politics, even amid anarchist scares.

Arnold Schoenberg remembered Bach as one of three friends, including Oskar Adler and Alexander von Zemlinsky, who influenced his youthful explorations of music and literature. Describing him as a "linguist, a philosopher, a connoisseur of literature, and a mathematician" as well as "a good musician", Schoenberg paid tribute to his friend by saying that it was Bach who furnished his character with "the ethical and moral power needed to withstand vulgarity and commonplace popularity" (My Evolution, 1949).

== Early studies and career ==
After studying Natural Sciences at the University of Vienna, where he was influenced by Ernst Mach, Bach became a journalist, being appointed as the music critic of the Arbeiter-Zeitung ('Worker's Newspaper') in 1904 after the death of Josef Scheu (musician and Social Democrat, 1841–1904; brother of activist Andreas Scheu).

Bach supported contemporary music in a city where performances of 'modern' works would sometimes be disrupted by noisy protests. He was a loyal supporter of the slightly older Gustav Mahler and Schoenberg.

== Socialist ==
An active socialist dedicated to making the arts accessible to the working classes, it was Bach who instituted the Arbeiter-Symphonie-Konzerte ('Workers' Symphony Concerts') in Vienna in 1905. His wide-ranging activities earned him the hostility of right-wing groups, who denounced his artistic programme as part of a "Jewish conspiracy" to undermine traditional Austrian culture. Such accusations were all the more vehement because Bach was also one of the earliest members of the Vienna Psychoanalytic Society, which met under the aegis of Sigmund Freud and whose members were mostly Jewish.

== Editor-in-chief of the Arbeiter-Zeitung ==
Bach was made editor-in-chief of the literature and art section of the Arbeiter-Zeitung in 1917. Once the Social Democrats came to power in 1919, he became highly influential politically. Immediately appointed director of the Sozialdemokratische Kunststelle ('Social-Democratic Arts Council'), he was able to develop a dynamic program of cultural events as an integral part of the programme of socialist reconstruction in so-called Red Vienna. He organised readings for the workers of Vienna by the satirist Karl Kraus.

The organization of the Theatre and Music Festival of the City of Vienna in 1924 was one of the high points of his career. But he also – year in, year out – made major musical and theatrical productions available to working-class audiences through a system of subsidised block bookings.

In order to help the workers to be better prepared for the concerts, operas or plays they were planning to attend, from 1926 to 1931, the Kunststelle issued a monthly arts magazine, Kunst und Volk, in which distinguished contributors from all around Europe discussed not only the artistic events in question, but also a broad range of historical, political and social matters.

In 1933, he commissioned a painting by Oskar Kokoschka of the Wilhelminenberg Kinderheim, with its panoramic view of the City of Vienna; and invited the avant-garde stage designer Frederick Kiesler to construct a full-sized experimental stage – the Raumbühne – in the Konzerthaus.

== Cultural politics ==
Bach can be said to have held a unique position in the cultural politics of Vienna. In a situation of increasing polarization between right and left, he aimed to create a cultural consensus by including conservatives like Hugo von Hofmannsthal and Mathilde Kralik in his system of patronage, as well as radicals like Ernst Fischer and Alban Berg. The esteem in which he was held by the Viennese cultural community is reflected in the collection of eighty-eight large-format literary, artistic and musical dedications in a Kassette presented to him in August 1924 on the occasion of his fiftieth birthday. This collection, now in the care of Gonville and Caius College, Cambridge, includes original artistic works of considerable value and forms a unique time capsule of Viennese cultural life.

=== Music ===
Music was, and remained, his central focus, and it was he who founded the amateur Vienna Singverein ('Vienna Choral Society') in 1919. This organization, together with the Arbeiter-Symphonie-Konzerte and the Workers' Music Conservatoire, flourished until all were disbanded upon the new fascist government's outlawing of the Social Democratic Party and imposition of an authoritarian constitution in 1934. Anton Webern was active as a conductor of all musical organisations, and developed a close and enduring friendship with Bach. It was Bach who delivered the address which opened the concert of Webern's music given on 3 December 1933 to celebrate the composer's fiftieth birthday, and Bach who persuaded Webern not to resign from his position as president of the Vienna International Society for Contemporary Music (ISCM) chapter when his projected performance of Berg's opera Wozzeck in Florence in 1934 was cancelled for political reasons.

== Move to London ==
In 1939 Bach, his wife Gisela and nephew Herbert, emigrated to London. In England, he became a leading member of the Austrian Labour Club and president of the Union of Austrian Journalists. He continued to organise musical events, particularly concerts of chamber music, supported by members of the future Amadeus Quartet.

Bach died in London in 1947.
