= Arbeiter-Zeitung (Vienna) =

Daily newspaper published in Austria (1889-1991)

- The front page of the Arbeiter-Zeitung, 14 April 1910.
- Type: Daily newspaper
- Founded: 12 July 1889
- Ceased publication: 1991
- Political alignment: Social democrat
- Language: German

Arbeiter Zeitung (German: "Workers' Newspaper") was the daily of the Social Democrat Party and published in Austria. It existed between 1889 and 1991.

== History and profile ==
Arbeiter Zeitung was started on 12 July 1889 by the Socialist Party and Victor Adler. The paper was banned in 1934 after the 13 February issue but reappeared on 4 August 1945 as the main organ of the Austrian Social Democrat Party, continuing until 1989, providing general coverage of Austrian and international news. From 1985 through 1989 it was published under the title Neue AZ; from 1989 to 1991 it was published as AZ. From 1989 until 1991 it was published as an independent newspaper, and it ceased publication in 1991.

In the 1920s the circulation of the daily reached 100,000 copies. The paper reduced its circulation by one quarter from 1960 to 1990.

Among its noted contributors and editors in the pre-war period was its cultural editor David Josef Bach. Ernst Fischer served as the editor of the paper.

Ilse Barea-Kulcsar's serialised novel Telefónica, an account of four days during the Spanish Civil War, was published in the paper in 1949.

== See also ==
- List of newspapers in Austria
