= Cajetan von Felder =

Austrian lawyer, entomologist and politician (1814-1894)

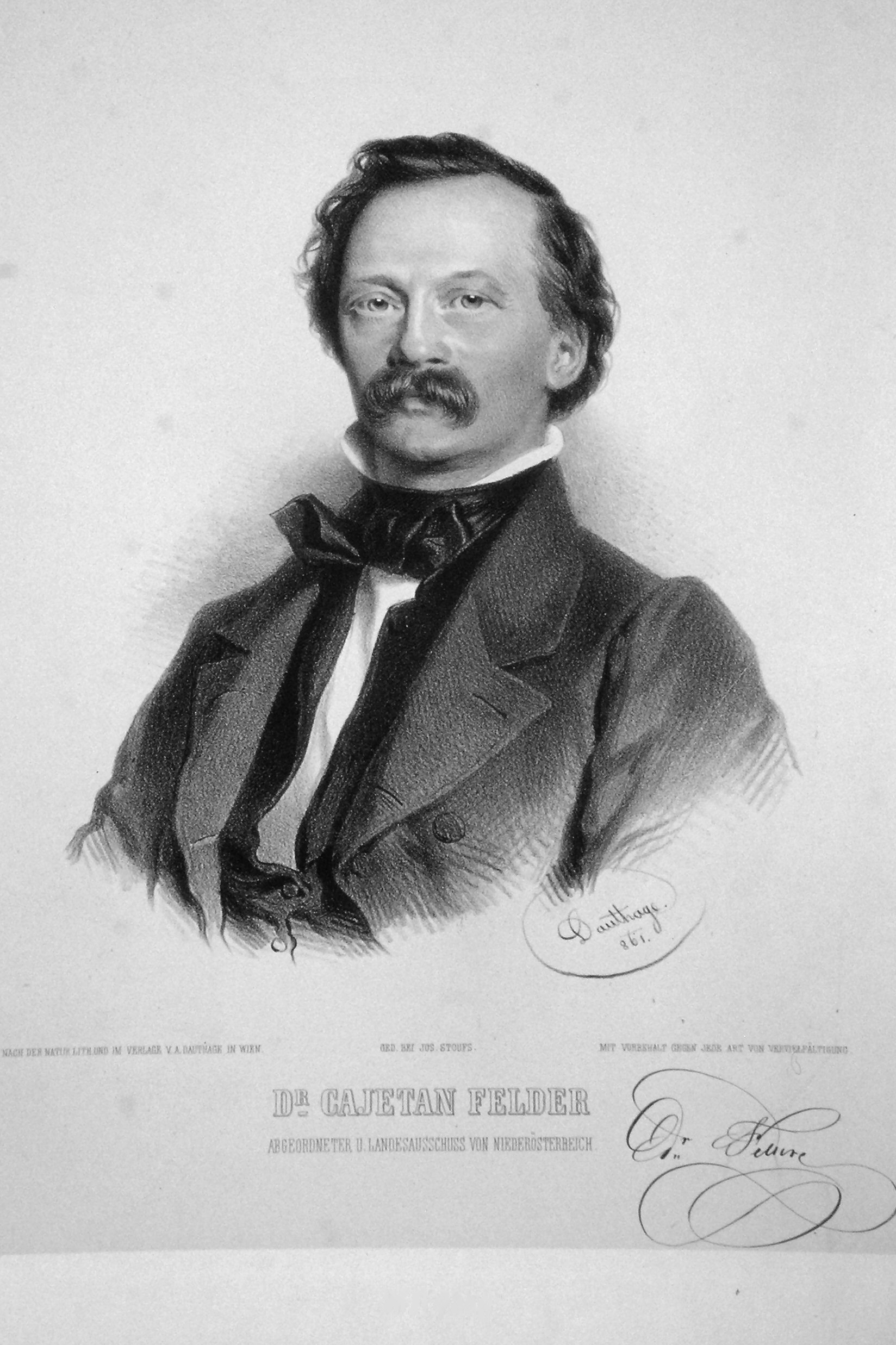
- Lithograph by Adolf Dauthage, 1861

Mayor of Vienna
- In office 20 December 1868 – 28 June 1878
- Preceded by: Andreas Zelinka
- Succeeded by: Julius von Newald

Personal details
- Born: 19 September 1814 Wieden (present-day Vienna), Austrian Empire
- Died: 30 November 1894 (aged 80) Vienna, Austria-Hungary
- Spouse: Josefine Sowa
- Children: Rudolf Felder
- Profession: Lawyer, entomologist

Baron Cajetan von Felder (German: Cajetan Freiherr von Felder; 19 September 1814 – 30 November 1894) was an Austrian lawyer, entomologist and liberal politician. He served as mayor of Vienna from 1868 to 1878.

== Life and career ==
Felder was born in Wieden, today the fourth district of Vienna. An orphan from 1826, he attended the Gymnasium of Seitenstetten Abbey, as well as schools in Brno and Vienna, and began to study law at the University of Vienna in 1834. He completed his legal internship in Brno and articled clerk in Vienna, obtaining his doctorate in 1841.

Since 1835 he had made intensive travels throughout Western and Southern Europe, mostly on foot, and studied foreign languages. From 1843 he also worked as an assistant at the Theresianum academy and as a court interpreter in Vienna, before passing the Austrian bar examination in 1848, only a few days before the outbreak of the March Revolution. In October 1848 Felder was elected to the newly established municipal council (Gemeinderat) of Vienna, however, he resigned a few months later due to political differences.

Over the next ten years he worked as a lawyer, running his own office in Vienna, and continued his study trips. He travelled to the Orient, to Africa, where in 1852 he met with young Alfred Brehm in Khartoum, through Eastern Europe, to North Cape, and through Russia. He gathered a large collection of beetle and butterflies. In 1860 he joined the Academy of Sciences Leopoldina.

In 1861, Felder again became a member of the Vienna Gemeinderat and also obtained a seat in the Landtag diet of Lower Austria. He was elected deputy mayor of Vienna in 1863 and head of the Vienna Danube regulation commission in the following year. Also in 1863, he took over the custody of 14-year-old Anton Dreher Jr., the son of late Anton Dreher, owner of one of the largest breweries in Europe. Felder mastered this task until Dreher reached majority in 1870.

When the Vienna mayor Andreas Zelinka died in office on 21 November 1868, Felder was elected his successor on December 20, outcompeting his ambitious rival Julius von Newald. Supported by a liberal majority in the municipal council, he held this office for almost ten years, being re-elected in 1871, 1874 and 1877. From 1869 he also served as vice-president of the Lower Austrian Landtag and member of the Austrian House of Lords, appointed by Emperor Franz Joseph I. One of the highlights of Felder's tenure was the erection of the lavish Vienna Town Hall on the Ringstraße boulevard from 1872 and the opening of the 1873 World Exhibition, whereby he could exploit his linguistic talent.

However, in the Vienna council, the disintegrating Liberals had to face the rising opposition of German National and Christian Social politicians like Karl Lueger. Finally in July 1878, Felder resigned from office. Elevated to the noble rank of Freiherr, he once again served as president of the Lower Austrian Landtag diet from 1880 to 1884, when he had to step back for health reasons.

In his late years, Felder retired to private life. He nearly went blind due to cataracts but published extensive memoirs. He died a few weeks after his eightieth birthday and was buried in the Weidling cemetery.

== Scientific work ==
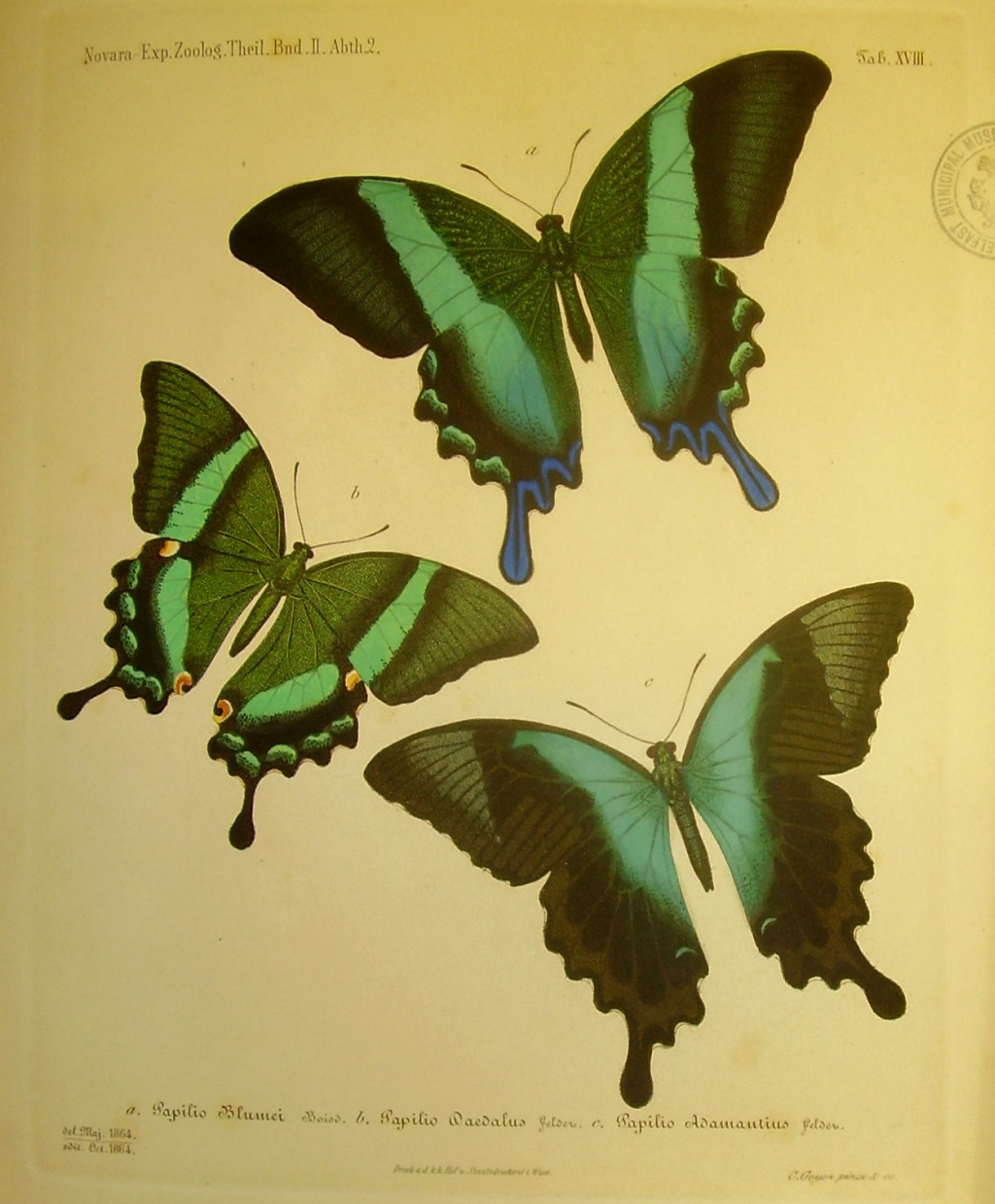
Plate from Felder's work Reise Fregatte Novara illustrating the swallowtail butterfly

Felder is also known for his work with Alois Friedrich Rogenhofer and his son Rudolf Felder, the book Reise Fregatte Novara: Zoologischer Theil., Lepidoptera, Rhopalocera (Journey of the Frigate Novara...) in three volumes (1865–1867). The SMS Novara under the command of Commodore Bernhard von Wüllerstorf-Urbair made a voyage of exploration in 1857–1859 and, with help from his son Rudolf, Cajetan von Felder (specializing in Lepidoptera) amassed a huge entomological collection that is deposited in the Naturhistorisches Museum in Vienna and the Natural History Museum in London. A collection of approximately 1,000 letters and postcards sent to Felder between c. 1856 and 1891 is also held by the Natural History Museum. They were sent to Felder, from all over the world, by leading 19th-century entomologists, and deal mainly with the exchange and purchase of specimens, Lepidoptera in particular.

| Preceded by: Andreas Zelinka | Mayor of Vienna; 1868–1878 | Succeeded by: Julius von Newald |
