= John Elefante =

Musical artist (born 1958)

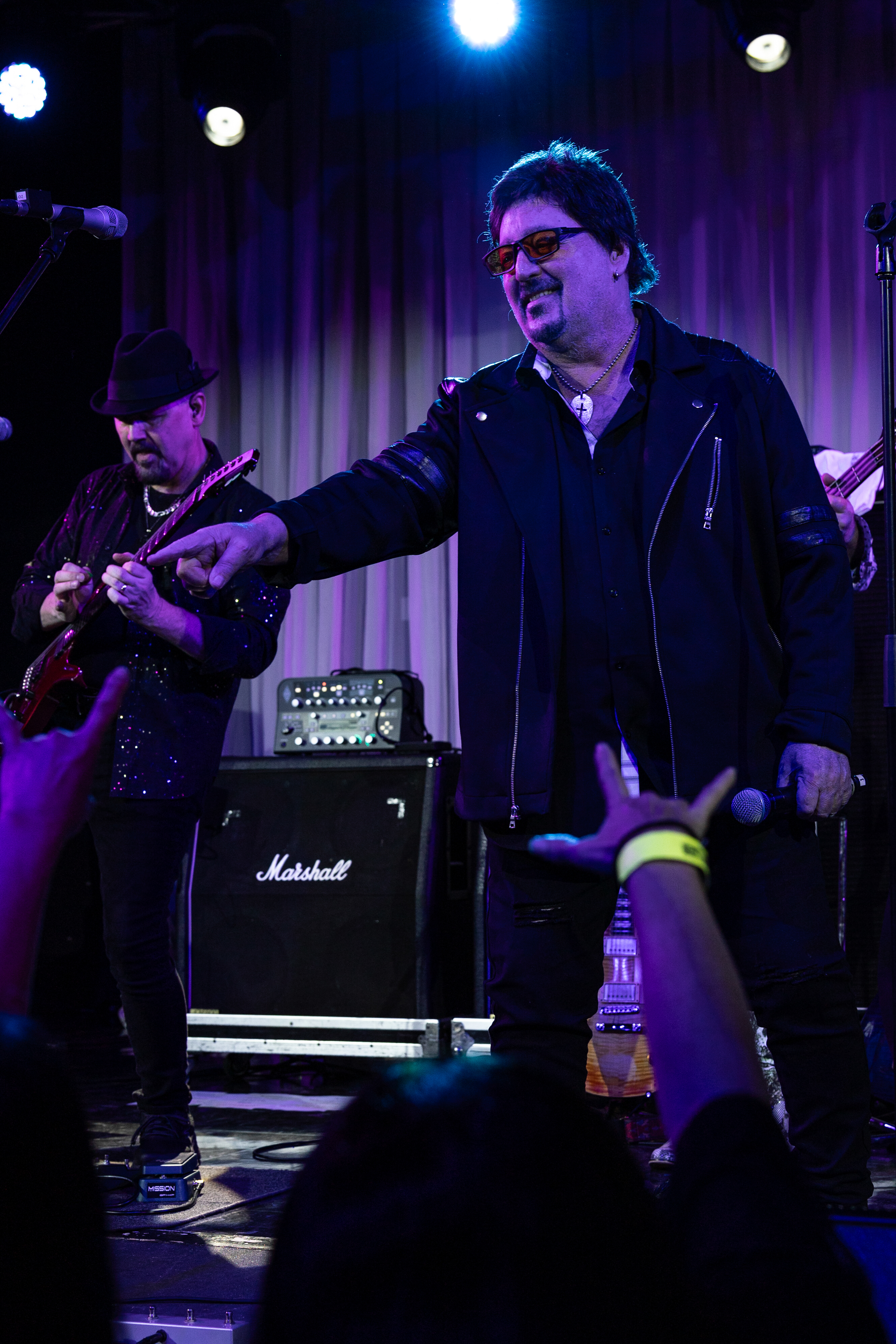
- Elefante performing with Voices of Classic Rock in 2025

Background information
- Born: March 18, 1958 (age 68); Levittown, New York, U.S.
- Genres: Hard rock; pop rock; progressive rock; Christian rock; contemporary Christian
- Occupations: Singer; songwriter; musician; record producer
- Instruments: Vocals; keyboards; guitar
- Years active: 1981–present
- Labels: Word; Pakaderm; Pamplin; Warner Music Group; Epic Records
- Website: johnelefante.com

John Elefante (born March 18, 1958) is an American singer, songwriter, musician, and record producer. From 1981–1984, he was lead vocalist of the rock group Kansas and is currently touring with several groups that have featured members from classic rock bands. His credits include writing and singing lead vocals on three multi-platinum albums. He produced albums that have earned numerous GMA Dove Awards, four Grammy Awards (most recently in 2000), and ten Grammy nominations. He has maintained a close working relationship with his brother, Dino, co-writer of several Kansas songs.

== Early life ==
He was born in Levittown, New York, but his family soon moved to Long Beach, California. He sang and played drums for his family band, The Brotherhood.

== 1981–1984: Kansas ==
In late 1981, Elefante auditioned for his second band position, as the new lead singer and keyboardist for Kansas, after the departure of its co-founder Steve Walsh. The previous year, Kansas was one of the top-grossing concert acts in the world. Several of the top vocalists of the time applied for the job, including Sammy Hagar, Dennis "Fergie" Frederiksen, and Jim Stafford.

Elefante did lead vocals and keyboards on two albums, and was a major songwriter along with Kerry Livgren. On 1982's Vinyl Confessions, he sang the No. 4 Billboard Mainstream Rock hit, "Play the Game Tonight". He wrote "Chasing Shadows" and the Top 40 single, "Right Away". In 1983, on the following album, Drastic Measures, he wrote "Fight Fire with Fire", which remains the band's highest charting single at No. 3 (Mainstream Rock). He wrote "Everybody's My Friend", which is the second single and reached No. 34 on the Billboard Mainstream Rock chart.

While with Kansas, he became a record producer. He issued Perfect Timing (1984) for the Southern California group, Sweet Comfort Band. Though not a major commercial success, Petra's Back to the Street was a Grammy-nominated, breakthrough, commercial success for both Elefante and the band. He also contributed songwriting, keyboards, background vocals, and engineering to the effort.

In 1984, on the retrospective collection The Best of Kansas, he wrote the album's one new track, "Perfect Lover". That year, he, Kerry Livgren, and Dave Hope left the band.

== 1985–1994 ==
In 1985, "Young and Innocent" appeared on the soundtrack to St. Elmo's Fire and was credited to "Elefante" – a collaborative effort by John and his brother Dino Elefante.

With both John and Dino Elefante as the band's primary producers, Petra's already popular Christian pop/rock niche was given a boost. Their accolades include multiple gold albums, 10 consecutive CCM Magazine Reader's Choice Awards, induction into the Gospel Music Hall of Fame and Hard Rock Cafe, and becoming the only artist to ever have four albums in the SoundScan top-100 Christian chart.

In 1987, while producing a various-artists album called California Metal, the album's production team of John and Dino Elefante ended up one track short and they decided to add a song which had been written for Kansas called "Wasn't It Love" (originally titled "What About Love") as the band Mastedon. Regency later requested a full-length album which became Mastedon's debut, It's a Jungle Out There.

He produced Petra's further releases, and 30 other albums. He usually performed on them, often sharing songwriting credits. He was committed as producer, eschewing other opportunities such as an offer to replace Bobby Kimball as lead singer for Grammy winners, Toto.

Elefante focused on heavier music in the early 1990s, including the Guardian release, Fire and Love, reaching regular rotation on MTV. He continued Mastedon with his brother. The band's name is a pachyderm-inspired reference to the brothers' last name. Its albums feature multiple lead singers and performances by other artists, creating an eclectic sound anchored by Elefante's songwriting. His brother Dino was songwriter and main guitarist.

Mastedon's first release is It's a Jungle Out There! (1989). In 1990, the band released Lofcaudio. This album continued the guest performance theme, though Elefante sang more of the lead vocals. Unfortunately, John and Dino's production schedule preempted any touring to commercially support the album (though the band did appear at least one Christian rock festival, Cornerstone, in 1991). The albums charted at No. 25 and No. 10, respectively.

John and Dino Elefante formed their own record label, Pakaderm. Most of the music they produced in the next 10 years was released from it. With major distribution through Word Records and A&M Records, Pakaderm became an important element in the brothers' success. Their label afforded them and their artists significant creative control, while still benefiting from major label resources.

With intense recording schedules in 1993, the brothers built their own 28,000-square-foot (2,600 m^{2}) recording studio in Nashville, called Sound Kitchen. In addition to their own productions, the brothers planned to rent time in the studio to other artists and producers.

== 1995–1999 ==
Elefante continued as producer, became record label chief, and began a solo career. He released two solo albums: Windows of Heaven (1995) and Corridors (1997).

Under the brothers’ management, Sound Kitchen recorded artists such as Bruce Springsteen, Faith Hill and Tim McGraw, and Buddy Guy. The complex was soon expanded to 80,000 square feet (7,400 m^{2}).

Elefante was hired by Pamplin Records in 1998, working with Dino to generate artist development. They produced 32 albums, most of which feature Elefante as arranger and performer. The styles include rock, gospel, pop, and metal.

In 1999, Elefante released his most popular solo effort, Defying Gravity (1999). It spawned several hit singles and mainstream music videos. He planned a 25-date solo tour but he was badly injured in an accident before the first concert and had to cancel the tour.

== 2000–2007 ==
Elefante rebounded, beginning with the production of Petra's Grammy award-winning album, Double Take. He continued working at Pamplin, producing 20 more albums for them in just three years. Simultaneously, he and Dino continued managing Sound Kitchen.

In 2002, he left Pamplin after a string of successful albums, including the debut for Natalie Grant.

That year, John and Dino sold Sound Kitchen. It had become the largest recording studio in the southeastern United States. Artists included Alabama, Amy Grant, Barry Manilow, Brad Paisley, Brooks & Dunn, Carrie Underwood, Dixie Chicks, Dolly Parton, Donna Summer, George Strait, Gretchen Wilson, Jewel, Jimmy Buffett, Julio Iglesias, Keith Urban, Kenny Rogers, LeAnn Rimes, Mary Chapin Carpenter, Michael W Smith, Peter Cetera, Reba McEntire, Rascal Flatts, Third Day, Trisha Yearwood, and Vince Gill.

Elefante started a new major-distributed label with his brother in 2003, Selectric Records. Co-managing the label with his brother, he produced 10 albums over the next three years. As a singer, he recorded with artists including Pat Boone and Bono.

In late 2006, the brothers closed the label but he produced three albums in 2007.

Elefante made a new Mastedon album, 3, featuring former Kansas bandmate Kerry Livgren. Its style is similar to Mastedon, his Kansas work, and his solo albums.

== 2010 ==
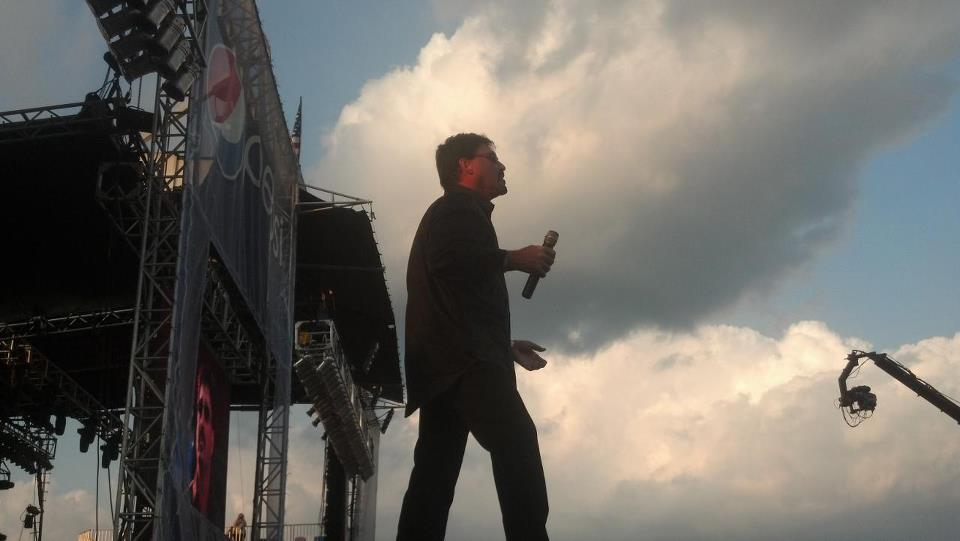
Elefante performing in 2012

As of 2010, Elefante had produced and or performed on more than 100 major label albums.

In 2010, Big3 Records rereleased 3 as Elefante's Revolution of Mind.

His latest studio album, On My Way to the Sun, released in May 2013, reunited Elefante with former Kansas bandmate Rich Williams and also featured current Kansas violinist David Ragsdale.

In 2013, Elefante released a single, "This Time" which was accompanied by a music video, that tells the story of his adopted daughter who was nearly aborted by her birth mother. The video shows a pregnant teenager entering an abortion clinic and then having a dream about a little girl she knew to be her unborn daughter.

Elefante is a member of the Jay Sekulow Band which is named after band leader Jay Sekulow, chief counsel of the American Center for Law & Justice (ACLJ), and one of Donald Trump's personal lawyers during his US presidency.

== Discography ==
Kansas

- 1982: Vinyl Confessions
- 1982: Best of Kansas Live (VHS) (a.k.a. Live Confessions DVD)
- 1983: Drastic Measures
- 1984: The Best of Kansas including "Perfect Lover" (Lead vocals, songwriter, keyboards, guitar, bass, drums, producer)

Mastedon

- 1989: It's a Jungle Out There! – Mastedon (Lead vocals, songwriter, keyboards, producer)
- 1990: Lofcaudio – Mastedon (Lead vocals, songwriter, keyboards, producer)
- 1992: Mastedon: Pakaderm Presents Video Stampede (VHS)
- 2009: 3* – Mastedon (Lead vocals, rhythm guitar, keyboards, producer, songwriter) (Europe/Asia)
- 2010: Revolution of Mind* – Mastedon (North America)

* Mastedon: 3 and Revolution Of Mind are the same album, but released in different markets.

Solo

- 1995: Windows of Heaven (Word Records) (Lead vocals, songwriter, keyboards, percussion, producer)
- 1997: Corridors (Pamplin Music) (Lead vocals, songwriter, keyboards, producer)
- 1999: Defying Gravity (Pamplin) (Lead vocals, songwriter, keyboards, producer)
- 2013: On My Way to the Sun (independent) (Lead vocals, songwriter, keyboards, producer)
- 2022: The Amazing Grace (independent) (Lead vocals, songwriter, keyboards, lead guitar, producer)

== Awards ==
- 1991 Grammy Award Best Rock Gospel Album for "Beyond Belief" – Petra (co-producer)
- 1993: GMA Dove Award Rock Song of the Year for "Destiny" – Petra (co-songwriter)
- 2000: Grammy Award Best Rock/Contemporary Gospel Album for Double Take – Petra (co-producer)

== See also ==
- Kansas
- Petra
- Mastedon
