= Tony Palacios =

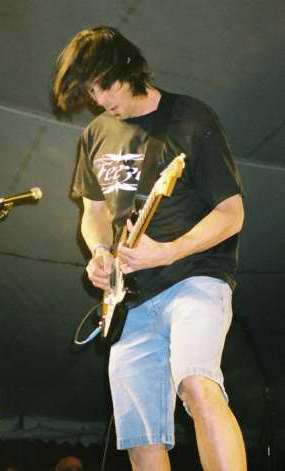
- Palacios performing live at Cornerstone 2001

Background information
- Born: March 28, 1960 (age 66)
- Origin: U.S.
- Genres: Christian rock
- Occupation: Musician
- Instruments: Guitar, vocals
- Years active: 1989–present
- Member of: Guardian

Tony Palacios is the lead guitarist of the Christian hard rock band, Guardian. Palacios joined the band in 1986 and has remained with them since, releasing nine studio albums, including three in Spanish.

In 1998, Palacios released his first instrumental guitar solo album entitled Epic Tales of Whoa! on Cadence Records. The album was assembled over a ten-year period, and received critical acclaim from the metal community. Presently he is working as a sound mixer, engineer, and producer for various Christian artists.

Palacios is best known for his use of synthetic noises in combination with "natural" guitars and other instruments to create interesting or inspiring sounds.
