= Kansas discography =

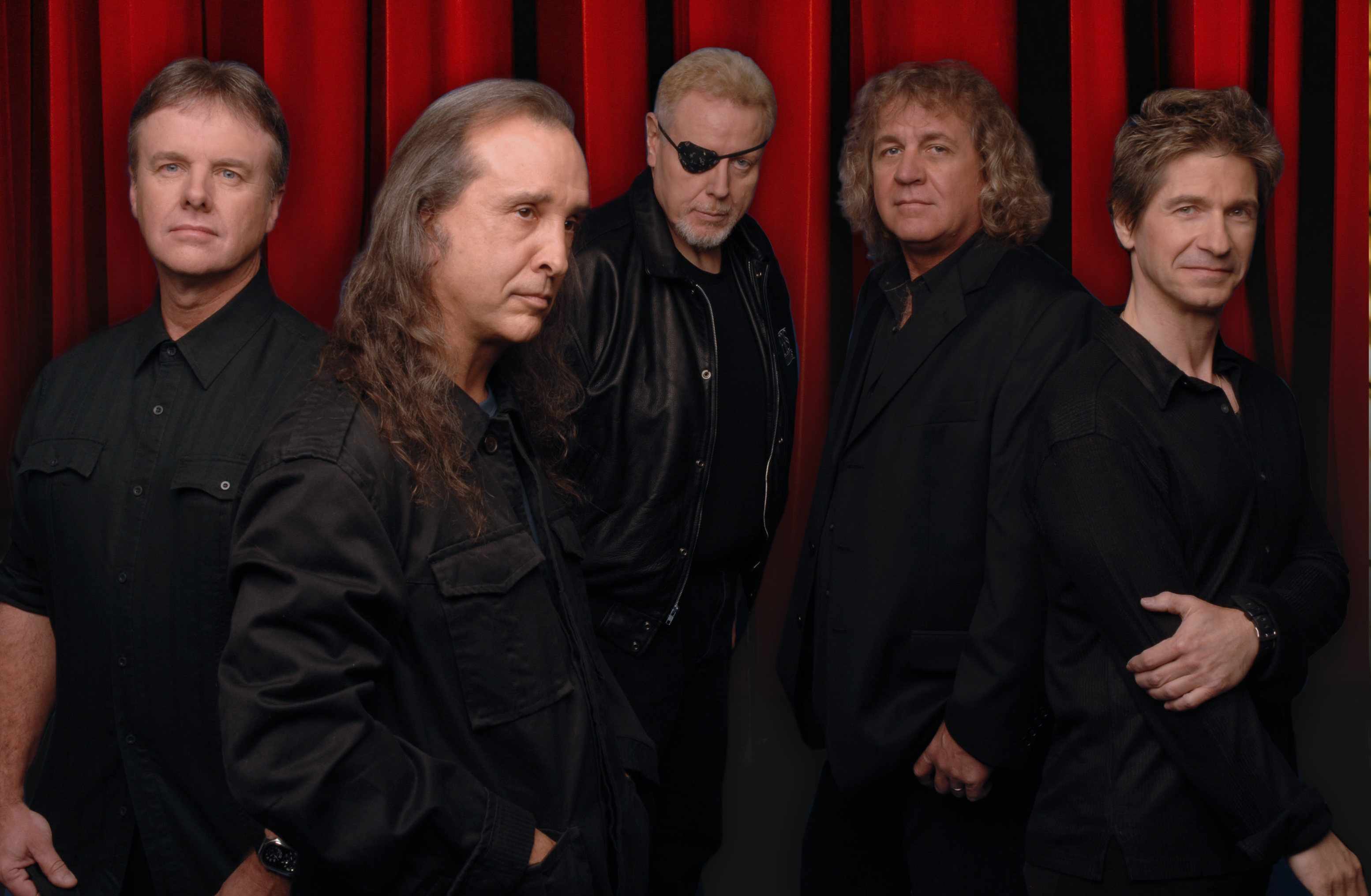
- Kansas in 2008.
- Studio albums: 16
- Live albums: 8
- Compilation albums: 9
- Singles: 29
- Music videos: 17

The discography of Kansas, an American rock band, consists of 16 studio albums, seven live albums, nine compilation albums, and 29 singles. Formed by members Kerry Livgren, Robby Steinhardt, Dave Hope, Phil Ehart, Steve Walsh, and Rich Williams, the group signed a recording contract with Kirshner Records in 1974. That same year they released their self-titled debut album.

After the release of two albums in 1975, including Masque (which eventually sold half a million copies in the United States after the group scored hit singles with later releases), the group released Leftoverture in October 1976. The album peaked at No. 5 on the Billboard 200 and spawned the single "Carry On Wayward Son", which reached No. 11 on the Billboard Hot 100, leading the album to sell over five million copies in the United States. The following year, their fifth album Point of Know Return was issued and certified four-times platinum by the Recording Industry Association of America; it spawned the top-10 single "Dust in the Wind". After the release of a live album, the group sixth studio release Monolith was issued in 1979, which spawned two singles. Audio-Visions was released in 1980 and certified gold by the Recording Industry Association of America. Their eighth studio album Vinyl Confessions contained the single "Play the Game Tonight", which became their first top-20 single on the Billboard Hot 100 in four years; however, the album itself did not sell well. Eventually, after the release of a ninth studio album in 1983, the group disbanded.

Kansas reformed again in 1985 and released the studio album Power in 1986 on MCA Records, whose single "All I Wanted" reached No. 19 on the Billboard Hot 100 that year. After the release of In the Spirit of Things in 1988, the group returned to the studio seven years later for the Freaks of Nature album (1995) on Intersound Records. In 1998, Always Never the Same was released on River North Records, followed by Somewhere to Elsewhere in 2000 on Magna Carta Records. Lineup changes in 2014 motivated a return to the studio which led to the release of The Prelude Implicit in 2016 and The Absence of Presence in 2020.

According to the Recording Industry Association of America, Kansas have sold 15.5 million physical records as well as scoring RIAA awards for digital sales of their biggest singles.

== Albums ==
=== Studio albums ===
| Year | Album details | Peak chart positions | | | | | Certifications (sales threshold) |
| Year | Album details | US | AUS | CAN | GER | SWE | Certifications (sales threshold) |
|---|---|---|---|---|---|---|---|
| 1974 | Kansas: Release date: March 8, 1974; Label: Kirshner Records | 174 | — | — | — | — | CAN: Gold; US: Gold |
| 1975 | Song for America: Release date: February 1975; Label: Kirshner Records | 57 | — | — | — | — | US: Gold |
| 1975 | Masque: Release date: September 1975; Label: Kirshner Records | 70 | — | — | — | — | US: Gold |
| 1976 | Leftoverture: Release date: October 21, 1976; Label: Kirshner Records | 5 | 68 | 2 | — | — | CAN: Platinum; US: 5× Platinum |
| 1977 | Point of Know Return: Release date: October 11, 1977; Label: Kirshner Records | 4 | 52 | 7 | — | — | CAN: Platinum; US: 4× Platinum |
| 1979 | Monolith: Release date: May 1979; Label: Kirshner Records | 10 | 69 | 18 | — | 27 | CAN: Gold; US: Gold |
| 1980 | Audio-Visions: Release date: September 1980; Label: Kirshner Records | 26 | — | 96 | — | 35 | US: Gold |
| 1982 | Vinyl Confessions: Release date: May 20, 1982; Label: Epic/Kirshner Records | 16 | — | — | 36 | — | |
| 1983 | Drastic Measures: Release date: July 1983; Label: Epic/Kirshner Records | 41 | — | — | — | — | |
| 1986 | Power: Release date: October 28, 1986; Label: MCA Records | 35 | — | 93 | — | — | |
| 1988 | In the Spirit of Things: Release date: October 25, 1988; Label: MCA Records | 114 | — | — | — | — | |
| 1995 | Freaks of Nature: Release date: May 29, 1995; Label: Magna Carta Records | — | — | — | — | — | |
| 1998 | Always Never the Same: Release date: May 19, 1998; Label: Magna Carta Records | — | — | — | — | — | |
| 2000 | Somewhere to Elsewhere: Release date: July 11, 2000; Label: Magna Carta Records | — | — | — | — | — | |
| 2016 | The Prelude Implicit: Release date: September 23, 2016; Label: Inside Out Music | 41 | — | — | 25 | 59 | |
| 2020 | The Absence of Presence: Release date: July 17, 2020; Label: Inside Out Music | — | — | — | 7 | 51 | |
"—" denotes releases that did not chart

=== Live albums ===
| Year | Album details | Peak positions | | | Certifications (sales threshold) |
| Year | Album details | US | AUS | CAN | Certifications (sales threshold) |
|---|---|---|---|---|---|
| 1978 | Two for the Show: Release date: October 1978; Label: Epic/Legacy Recordings | 32 | 95 | 29 | US: Platinum |
| 1992 | Live at the Whisky: Release date: July 7, 1992; Label: Intersound Records | — | — | — | |
| 1998 | King Biscuit Flower Hour Presents Kansas: Release date: October 20, 1998; Label: King Biscuit Flower | — | — | — | |
| 2001 | Dust in the Wind: Release date: 2001; Label: Disky Communications Europe | — | — | — | |
| 2002 | Device - Voice - Drum: Release date: October 8, 2002; Label: JVC Victor | — | — | — | |
| 2009 | There's Know Place Like Home: Release date: October 13, 2009; Label: InsideOut Music | — | — | — | |
| 2017 | Leftoverture: Live and Beyond: Release date: November 3, 2017; Label: InsideOut Music | 20 (rock sales) | — | — | |
| 2021 | Point of Know Return: Live and Beyond: Release date: May 28, 2021; Label: InsideOut Music | 53 (current album sales) | — | — | |
"—" denotes releases that did not chart

=== Compilation albums ===
| Year | Album details | Peak positions | | Certifications (sales threshold) |
| Year | Album details | US | CAN | Certifications (sales threshold) |
|---|---|---|---|---|
| 1984 | The Best of Kansas: Release date: July 31, 1984; Label: CBS Records | 154 | 86 | US: 4× Platinum |
| 1992 | Carry On: Release date: 1992; Label: Sony BMG | — | — | |
| 1994 | The Kansas Boxed Set: Release date: July 12, 1994; Label: Epic/Legacy Recordings | — | — | |
| 2002 | The Ultimate Kansas: Release date: July 2, 2002; Label: Epic/Legacy Recordings | — | — | |
| 2004 | Sail On: The 30th Anniversary Collection: Release date: August 31, 2004; Label: Sony BMG | — | — | |
| 2005 | On the Other Side: Release date: 2005; Label: Sony BMG | — | — | |
| 2006 | Works in Progress: Release date: May 23, 2006; Label: Comependia Records | — | — | |
| 2008 | Playlist: The Very Best of Kansas: Release date: April 29, 2008; Label: Sony Legacy | — | — | |
| 2015 | Miracles Out of Nowhere: Release date: March 2015; Label: Epic, Legacy Recordings | 68 | — | |
| 2022 | Another Fork In The Road - 50 Years Of Kansas: Release date: December 9, 2022; Label: InsideOut Music | — | — | |
"—" denotes releases that did not chart

== Singles ==
| Year | Title | Peak chart positions | | | | | | | Certifications (sales threshold) | Album |
| Year | Title | US | US Main. | US AC | AUS | CAN | CAN AC | UK | Certifications (sales threshold) | Album |
|---|---|---|---|---|---|---|---|---|---|---|
| 1974 | "Can I Tell You" | — | — | — | — | — | — | — | | Kansas |
| 1975 | "Lonely Wind" | — | — | — | — | — | — | — | | Kansas |
| 1975 | "Song for America" | — | — | — | — | — | — | — | | Song for America |
| 1976 | "It Takes a Woman's Love (To Make a Man)" | — | — | — | — | — | — | — | | Masque |
| 1976 | "Carry On Wayward Son" | 11 | — | — | 58 | 5 | — | 51 | GER: Gold; UK: Platinum; US: 4× Platinum | Leftoverture |
| 1977 | "What's on My Mind" | — | — | — | — | 89 | — | — | | Leftoverture |
| 1977 | "Point of Know Return" | 28 | — | — | — | 13 | — | — | | Point of Know Return |
| 1978 | "Dust in the Wind" | 6 | — | 6 | 52 | 3 | 1 | — | CAN: Gold; UK: Silver; US: 3× Platinum | Point of Know Return |
| 1978 | "Portrait (He Knew)" | 64 | — | 62 | — | — | — | — | | Point of Know Return |
| 1979 | "Lonely Wind" (live) | 60 | — | — | — | 62 | — | — | | Two for the Show |
| 1979 | "People of the South Wind" | 23 | — | — | — | 59 | — | — | | Monolith |
| 1979 | "Reason to Be" | 52 | — | — | — | — | — | — | | Monolith |
| 1980 | "Hold On" | 40 | — | — | — | — | — | — | | Audio-Visions |
| 1980 | "Got to Rock On" | 76 | — | — | — | — | — | — | | Audio-Visions |
| 1982 | "Play the Game Tonight" | 17 | 4 | — | — | 35 | — | — | | Vinyl Confessions |
| 1982 | "Chasing Shadows" [airplay] | — | 54 | — | — | — | — | — | | Vinyl Confessions |
| 1982 | "Right Away" | 73 | 33 | — | — | — | — | — | | Vinyl Confessions |
| 1983 | "Fight Fire with Fire" | 58 | 3 | — | — | — | — | 116 | | Drastic Measures |
| 1983 | "Everybody's My Friend" | — | 34 | — | — | — | — | — | | Drastic Measures |
| 1984 | "Perfect Lover" [airplay] | — | 54 | — | — | — | — | — | | The Best of Kansas |
| 1986 | "All I Wanted" | 19 | 10 | 14 | — | 75 | 29 | 187 | | Power |
| 1987 | "Power" | 84 | 38 | — | — | — | — | — | | Power |
| 1987 | "Can't Cry Anymore" | — | — | — | — | — | — | — | | Power |
| 1988 | "Stand Beside Me" | — | 13 | — | — | — | — | — | | In the Spirit of Things |
| 1995 | "Desperate Times" | — | — | — | — | — | — | — | | Freaks of Nature |
| 1995 | "Hope Once Again" | — | — | — | — | — | — | — | | Freaks of Nature |
| 2020 | "Throwing Mountains" | — | — | — | — | — | — | — | | The Absence of Presence |
| 2020 | "Memories Down the Line" | — | — | — | — | — | — | — | | The Absence of Presence |
| 2020 | "Jets Overhead" | — | — | — | — | — | — | — | | The Absence of Presence |
"—" denotes releases that did not chart

== Other album appearances ==
| Year | Song | Album |
|---|---|---|
| 2001 | "The Light" | Sounds Like Christmas |

== Music videos ==
| Year | Song | Director(s) |
|---|---|---|
| 1976 | "Carry on Wayward Son" | |
| 1977 | "Point of Know Return" | |
| 1978 | "Dust in the Wind" | Bruce Gowers |
| 1979 | "On the Other Side" | Arnold Levine |
| 1979 | "People of the South Wind" | Arnold Levine |
| 1979 | "Away from You" | Arnold Levine |
| 1979 | "Reason to Be" | Arnold Levine |
| 1982 | "Windows" | Mark Stimson |
| 1982 | "Play the Game Tonight" | Mark Stimson |
| 1983 | "Fight Fire with Fire" | Dominic Orlando |
| 1984 | "Everybody's My Friend" | Dominic Orlando |
| 1984 | "Best of Kansas (Medley)" | Ed Pacio |
| 1986 | "All I Wanted" | |
| 1987 | "Can't Cry Anymore" | James Yukich |
| 1988 | "Stand Beside Me" | Michael Patterson Candace Reckinger |
| 2017 | "Rhythm in the Spirit" | Steven C. Knapp |
| 2020 | "Throwing Mountains" | |
