= The Prelude Implicit =

Studio album by Kansas
- Released: September 23, 2016
- Recorded: January–February 2016
- Studio: Real 2 Reel Studios, Jonesboro, Georgia
- Genre: Progressive rock; hard rock
- Length: 53:19
- Label: Inside Out
- Producer: Zak Rizvi, Phil Ehart, Rich Williams

Kansas chronology
There's Know Place Like Home (2009)	The Prelude Implicit (2016)	The Absence of Presence (2020)

The Prelude Implicit is the fifteenth studio album by American progressive rock band Kansas, released in September 2016. It is their third studio album without founding member, lead vocalist and keyboardist Steve Walsh, who retired from the band in 2014; the other two being 1982's Vinyl Confessions and 1983's Drastic Measures. It is their first album with lead vocalist and keyboardist Ronnie Platt, keyboardist David Manion, and guitarist Zak Rizvi, who started as a co-producer and songwriter before being named a full member of the band as well as the first album to feature violinist David Ragsdale since Freaks of Nature.

== Background ==
The first album since 2000's Somewhere to Elsewhere, it marks the longest period between two Kansas studio albums to date. Founding member Kerry Livgren, who had returned as the main songwriter for that album, departed the band again following its release leaving Steve Walsh as the group's sole songwriter. His reluctance towards committing to new studio material left the band without new output. While the group would continue to release live and compilation albums throughout the next decade, Native Window was formed as a side project by Ehart, Greer, Ragsdale and Williams who wanted to record new material as a separate entity.

Walsh's departure in 2014 and the addition of Platt and Manion and later Rizvi paved the way for a new Kansas album.

== Reception ==
Professional ratings
Review scores
Source	Rating
AllMusic	3.5/5 stars
Ultimate Guitar Archive	7.7/10

Tim Jones of Record Collector magazine found the album "an attempted simulacrum of heyday glories, laudable while not quite scaling the heights", remarking how "the trademark intricate interplay of strings, driving rhythm and golden harmonies is all present and correct" and "should please the faithful, without eclipsing more recent predecessors like Somewhere to Elsewhere". AllMusic's James Christopher Monger praised the album for being "something that sounds both familiar and forward thinking" and wrote that "the technically superb The Prelude Implicit – literally – hits all of the right notes and should please longtime fans, despite the absence of Walsh". Ultimate Guitar staff enjoyed the balance between hard rock, AOR and prog rock of the new songs, signaling in particular "the album's grand, epic piece" "The Voyage of Eight Eighteen", which "could have been written in the same sessions that produced tracks like 'Song for America' and 'Magnum Opus'." The reviewer also wrote that the new Kansas line-up "doesn't at all sound like a band bereft of musical inspiration", but "like a band firing on all cylinders, putting out the music they actually want to make" and probably producing "the most inspired thing they've done since their heyday."

== Track listing ==
No.	Title	Writer(s)	Length
1.	"With This Heart"	Zak Rizvi, Ronnie Platt, Phil Ehart, Rich Williams, David Ragsdale	4:13
2.	"Visibility Zero"	Rizvi, Platt, Ehart	4:27
3.	"The Unsung Heroes"	Geoff Byrd, Platt, Ehart, David Manion, Ragsdale, Rizvi, Williams	5:02
4.	"Rhythm in the Spirit"	Rizvi, Platt	5:58
5.	"Refugee"	Mike Slamer, Billy Greer, Ehart, Manion, Platt, Ragsdale, Williams	4:23
6.	"The Voyage of Eight Eighteen"	Rizvi, Platt, Ehart	8:18
7.	"Camouflage"	Rizvi, Greer, Ehart, Platt	6:42
8.	"Summer"	Rizvi, Greer, Ehart, Williams, Manion, Ragsdale	4:07
9.	"Crowded Isolation"	Rizvi, Platt, Ehart, Greer, Manion, Ragsdale, Williams	6:10
10.	"Section 60" (instrumental)	Rizvi, Ehart	4:01
Total length:			53:19

Bonus tracks (Deluxe edition)
No.	Title	Lyrics	Music	Length
11.	"Home on the Range"	John H. Lomax	Daniel Kelley	3:26
12.	"Oh Shenandoah" (instrumental)		traditional	3:39
Total length:				60:24

== Personnel ==
Kansas

- Ronnie Platt – lead vocals, piano on "The Voyage of Eight Eighteen"
- Rich Williams – electric and acoustic guitars, producer
- Zak Rizvi – electric guitar, vocals, producer, mixing
- David Manion – piano, keyboards, organ and sound design
- David Ragsdale – violin, vocals
- Billy Greer – bass, vocals, lead vocals on "Summer"
- Phil Ehart – drums, percussion, producer

Production

- Chad Singer – engineer
- James Cobb, Jonathan Beckner, Will McPhaul – assistant engineers
- Jeff Glixman – mixing, mix and mastering producer
- Vlado Meller – mastering
- Denise de la Cerda – artwork
- Michie Turpin – photography
- Christine Boyd – logo and title design
- Thomas Ewerhard – album layout

== Charts ==
Chart (2016)	Peak position
Belgian Albums (Ultratop Flanders)	102
Belgian Albums (Ultratop Wallonia)	41
Dutch Albums (Album Top 100)	66
Finnish Albums (Suomen virallinen lista)	46
French Albums (SNEP)	105
German Albums (Offizielle Top 100)	25
Italian Albums (FIMI)	63
Japanese Albums (Oricon)	112
Scottish Albums (OCC)	54
Spanish Albums (PROMUSICAE)	87
Swedish Albums (Sverigetopplistan)	59
Swiss Albums (Schweizer Hitparade)	23
UK Progressive Albums (OCC)	7
UK Rock & Metal Albums (OCC)	9
US Billboard 200	41
US Independent Albums (Billboard)	3
US Top Album Sales (Billboard)	15
US Top Rock Albums (Billboard)	5
US Indie Store Album Sales (Billboard)	14

Also charted on Billboard charts at No. 17 in Vinyl Album Sales, No. 10 in Internet Albums, and No. 14 in Current Albums.
