= The Absence of Presence =

Studio album by Kansas
- Released: July 17, 2020
- Genres: Progressive rock; hard rock
- Length: 47:21
- Label: Inside Out
- Producers: Zak Rizvi, Phil Ehart, Rich Williams

Kansas chronology
The Prelude Implicit (2016)	The Absence of Presence (2020)

Singles from The Absence of Presence
- 1. "Throwing Mountains" Released: April 3, 2020; 2. "Memories Down The Line" Released: May 15, 2020; 3. "Jets Overhead" Released: June 5, 2020

Professional ratings
Review scores
Source	Rating
AllMusic	4/5 stars
Metal Hammer Germany	5/7 stars

The Absence of Presence is the sixteenth studio album by American progressive rock band Kansas. The album was originally due to be released on June 26, 2020, but due to manufacturing delays the release date was postponed to July 17, 2020. It is their fourth studio album without founding member, lead vocalist and keyboardist Steve Walsh, who retired from the band in 2014; the other three being 1982's Vinyl Confessions, 1983's Drastic Measures and 2016's The Prelude Implicit. It is Kansas' first album to feature keyboardist Tom Brislin, and the last to feature violinist David Ragsdale and bassist Billy Greer. Guitarist Zak Rizvi left the band in April 2021, nine months after the release of this album, but rejoined in 2024.

== Background ==
The Absence of Presence serves as a follow-up to The Prelude Implicit, but unlike that album, The Absence of Presence was written entirely by the band. The bulk of the songwriting duties were carried out by the band's newest members, Zak Rizvi (who wrote the music for 6 of the 9 songs) and Tom Brislin (who wrote the music for the other 3 songs, plus lyrics for 6 songs), with other lyric contributions by Ronnie Platt (2 songs) and founding member Phil Ehart (4 songs). Ehart also came up with the album title, as well as at least three of the song titles (the title track, "Throwing Mountains", and "Animals on the Roof"), which gave Brislin a concept to work with. The Absence of Presence marks the debut lead vocal from Brislin, making the total number of lead vocalists in the band at three, a feature not seen since Somewhere to Elsewhere. The album's recording sessions took place simultaneously with the band's tour cycle.

== Track listing ==
The Absence of Presence track listing
No.	Title	Lyrics	Music	Length
1.	"The Absence of Presence"	Tom Brislin, Phil Ehart	Zak Rizvi	8:22
2.	"Throwing Mountains"	Brislin, Ehart	Rizvi	6:18
3.	"Jets Overhead"	Brislin	Rizvi	5:17
4.	"Propulsion 1"	Instrumental	Brislin	2:17
5.	"Memories Down the Line"	Brislin	Brislin	4:38
6.	"Circus of Illusion"	Ronnie Platt	Rizvi	5:19
7.	"Animals on the Roof"	Brislin, Ehart	Rizvi	5:12
8.	"Never"	Platt, Ehart	Rizvi	4:50
9.	"The Song the River Sang"	Brislin	Brislin	5:05
Total length:				47:21

== Personnel ==
- Ronnie Platt – lead vocals
- Rich Williams – guitars, acoustic guitar, co-production
- Zak Rizvi – guitars, backing vocals, production, mixing
- Tom Brislin – keyboards, backing vocals, lead vocals on "The Song The River Sang"
- David Ragsdale – violin, backing vocals
- Billy Greer – bass, backing vocals
- Phil Ehart – drums, percussion, co-production

== Charts ==
Chart performance for The Absence of Presence
Chart (2020)	Peak position
Austrian Albums (Ö3 Austria)	34
Belgian Albums (Ultratop Flanders)	110
Belgian Albums (Ultratop Wallonia)	44
Dutch Albums (Album Top 100)	50
Finnish Albums (Suomen virallinen lista)	39
French Albums (SNEP)	133
German Albums (Offizielle Top 100)	7
Hungarian Albums (MAHASZ)	37
Japanese Albums (Oricon)	79
Scottish Albums (Official Charts)	39
Spanish Albums (Promusicae)	79
Swedish Albums (Sverigetopplistan)	51
Swiss Albums (Schweizer Hitparade)	4
UK Progressive Albums (Official Charts)	4
UK Rock & Metal Albums (Official Charts)	2
US Independent Albums (Billboard)	32
US Top Rock Albums (Billboard)	31
US Indie Store Album Sales (Billboard)	12
