= There's Know Place Like Home =

2009 live album by Kansas

Video by Kansas
- Released: October 13, 2009
- Recorded: February 7, 2009
- Venue: Washburn University, Topeka, Kansas
- Genre: Progressive rock
- Length: 104 min.
- Label: Star City Records (US); InsideOut Music (Europe)
- Director: Steve Angus
- Producer: Jeff Glixman, Jim Gentile, Kansas, Tom Gregory, Steve Angus

Kansas video chronology
Works in Progress (2006)	There's Know Place Like Home (2009)	The Prelude Implicit (2016)

There's Know Place Like Home

Live album by Kansas
- Released: October 13, 2009
- Recorded: February 7, 2009
- Venue: Washburn University, Topeka, Kansas
- Genre: Progressive rock
- Length: 79:03 (US); 103:59 (Europe)
- Label: Star City Records (US); InsideOut Music (Europe)
- Producer: Jeff Glixman, Jim Gentile and Kansas

Kansas chronology
Playlist: The Very Best of Kansas (2008)	There's Know Place Like Home (2009)	The Prelude Implicit (2016)

Professional ratings
Review scores
Source	Rating
AllMusic	3.5/5 stars

There's Know Place Like Home is Kansas' fifth live album. It was released as a double CD and also on DVD on October 13, 2009 and Blu-ray on November 23, 2009. The DVD charted at No. 5 on the Billboard Music DVD chart the week of its release, Kansas's only appearance on that chart.

There's Know Place Like Home is a recording of a concert that took place on February 7, 2009 in Topeka, Kansas at Washburn University (which several members of Kansas attended) along with the Washburn University Symphony Orchestra. The concert featured several orchestral arrangements by Larry Baird of Kansas songs (Baird also served as conductor for this concert) - arrangements the band has been playing with symphony orchestras around the US since the release of 1998's Always Never the Same which featured the London Symphony Orchestra accompanying the band.

The cover features the old man depicted on the cover of Leftoverture and the papers around him with a black background.

A special edition bundle has been released, containing the DVD and two CDs of the concert.

== Track listings ==
=== DVD, Blu-ray and European double CD edition ===
No.	Title	Length
1.	"Howlin' at the Moon" (excerpt from "Magnum Opus")	3:40
2.	"Belexes"	5:43
3.	"Point of Know Return"	3:25
4.	"Song for America"	9:29
5.	"On the Other Side"	7:51
6.	"Musicatto" (orchestral arrangements by Andrew Powell)	3:22
7.	"Ghosts/Rainmaker"	4:32
8.	"Nobody's Home"	4:55
9.	"Hold On"	5:07
10.	"Cheyenne Anthem"	7:34
11.	"Icarus II"	6:57
12.	"Icarus: Borne on Wings of Steel"	6:37
13.	"Miracles Out of Nowhere"	6:40
14.	"The Wall"	5:51
15.	"Fight Fire with Fire"	4:20
16.	"Dust in the Wind"	4:13
17.	"Carry On Wayward Son"	6:50
18.	"Down the Road" (Afternoon Jam)	6:53

== US CD track listing ==
No.	Title	Length
1.	"Belexes"	5:43
2.	"Point of Know Return"	3:25
3.	"Song for America"	9:29
4.	"Musicatto"	3:22
5.	"Ghosts/Rainmaker"	4:32
6.	"Nobody's Home"	4:55
7.	"Hold On"	5:07
8.	"Icarus II"	6:57
9.	"Icarus: Borne on Wings of Steel"	6:37
10.	"Miracles Out of Nowhere"	6:40
11.	"Fight Fire with Fire"	4:20
12.	"Dust in the Wind"	4:13
13.	"Carry On Wayward Son"	6:50
14.	"Down the Road" (Afternoon Jam)	6:53
Total length:		79:03

== Personnel ==
Kansas

- Steve Walsh - keyboards, lead vocals
- Rich Williams - lead guitar, acoustic guitar
- David Ragsdale - violin, electric guitar, backing vocals
- Billy Greer - bass guitar, acoustic guitar, lead and backing vocals
- Phil Ehart - drums, director

Guest musicians

- Larry Baird - conductor, orchestral arrangements
- Kerry Livgren - guitar
- Steve Morse - guitar

Production

- Jeff Glixman - director, producer, mixing
- Jim Gentile - producer
- Zak Rizvi - director, video editor
- Steve Angus - audio/video director and producer
- Tom Gregory - audio/video producer
- Curt Casassa - associate director
- Steve Rawls, Jonathan Beckner - additional post-production
- Darcy Proper - audio mastering
- Christine Boyd - graphic design

=== Washburn University Symphony Orchestra ===
==== Washburn University Staff ====
- Lori Meador - White Concert Hall Director of Operations
- Norman Gamoa - Conductor of the Washburn University Symphony Orchestra
- Alex Wise - Assistant conductor
- AnnMarie Snook - Chair of the WU Music Department
- Lyle Waring - White Concert Hall tech
- Mark Noble - Electrician
- Lynn Wilson - Theater tech
- Elisa Bicker - Pipe organ instructor

==== Violin ====
- Carlos Cabezas, Principal
- Román Carranza
- Emilio Castro
- Manda Chui
- Diana Crain
- William Darst, Concertmaster
- Amanda Huguenin
- Eun Hye Kim
- Robert Johnson
- Valeriya Kanaeva
- Michelle Lassiter
- Michael Putnam
- Manuel Tábora
- Mario Zelaya

==== Viola ====
- Solmer Alvarez
- Lucia Darst
- Marcela Fernández
- Caitlin Givens
- Roberto Henríquez, Principal
- Lindsay Paul

==== Cello ====
- Austin Abernathy
- Samuel Cho, Principal
- Taryn Doty
- Milovan Paz
- Esther Valladares
- Phillip Watson

==== Bass ====
- Courtney Doole
- Carrie Drexler, Principal
- Jeff Torrez
- Aaron Roeckers
- Joel Stratton

==== Flute ====
- Erica Nightengale, Principal
- Christopher Roth
- Jessica Vogel, Piccolo

==== Oboe ====
- Robyn Bolton, English Horn
- Chelsea Loder
- José Salazar, Principal

==== Clarinet ====
- Amanda Mayo, Principal
- Anthony Roth
- Bailey Altman, Bass Clarinet

==== Bassoon ====
- Natalie Moreland, Principal
- Genni Newsham

==== Horn ====
- James Gutiérrez
- Anna Lischke, Associate Principal
- Raúl Rodríguez, Principal
- Jacob Trabert
- Yiyang Zhang

==== Trumpet ====
- James Kirkwood
- Travis Mott
- Juan Pablo Rodríguez, Principal
- Jakub Roštík

==== Trombone ====
- Neil McKay
- Tyson Sterling
- Paul Kirkwood, Principal

==== Tuba ====
- Benjamin Thomson, Principal

==== Harp ====
- Lauren Woidela
- Mariela Flores, Principal

==== Keyboards ====
- Allegra Fisher, Principal
- Jordan Ward, Celesta

==== Timpani & percussion ====
- William Arasmith
- Matthew Bell
- Jason Degenhardt
- Brandon Graves
- David Liston
- Theodore Musick, Principal
- Lucas Whippo
- David Wingerson
