= In the Spirit of Things =

Studio album by Kansas
- Released: October 25, 1988
- Recorded: 1988
- Studios: Soundscape (Atlanta); Can-Am (Los Angeles); Ocean Way (Hollywood)
- Genres: Art rock; pop rock; hard rock
- Length: 52:54
- Label: MCA
- Producers: Bob Ezrin, Greg Ladanyi, Phil Ehart

Kansas chronology
Power (1986)	In the Spirit of Things (1988)	Carry On (1992)

Singles from In the Spirit of Things
- 1. "Stand Beside Me" Released: October 31, 1988 (US)

In the Spirit of Things is the eleventh studio album by American rock band Kansas, released in 1988 (see 1988 in music). It is a very loosely organized concept album, telling the story of a flood hitting the real Kansas city of Neosho Falls in 1951. It was the first Kansas album since 1975's Masque to lack a hit single.

== History ==
According to the author Dan Fitzgerald, Rich Williams was inspired to create this album after having read the book Ghost Towns of Kansas, Volume II (1979), specifically the chapter on Neosho Falls.

The album is Kansas's last studio effort for a major label. It didn't receive much promotion, as MCA Records dropped a slew of "older" artists shortly after its release and famously switched its attention to current younger acts such as Tiffany. Kansas got caught in that decision and the album was a commercial failure. The label did produce several promotional materials for the record, including a glossy video for "Stand Beside Me". The song was played regularly on MTV and allowed the single to hit the album rock charts, the last Kansas single to chart in any format. Other songs were released in odd formats, such as a 12" promotional single of "I Counted on Love", an import edited CD single of "House on Fire", and a small-sized CD single of "Stand Beside Me". The album would also be the last Kansas release to appear in vinyl format until the release of The Prelude Implicit in 2016.

A tour in support of this album included a broadcast by the King Biscuit Flower Hour, which many years later released the show as a CD.

== Reception ==
Professional ratings
Review scores
Source	Rating
AllMusic	3/5 stars
The Rolling Stone Album Guide	1/5 stars

In its retrospective review, AllMusic deemed the album "one of the group's more consistent albums and easily a latter-day highlight." They criticized the album's dated production and the lack of a single to compare to their 1970s hits, but argued it to be one of Kansas's most focused efforts.

== Track listing ==
Side one
No.	Title	Writer(s)	Length
1.	"Ghosts"	Steve Walsh, Steve Morse, Bob Ezrin	4:18
2.	"One Big Sky" (additional lyrics by Ezrin, Walsh, Phil Ehart)	Howard Kleinfeld, Michael Dan Ehmig	5:17
3.	"Inside of Me"	Morse, Walsh	4:42
4.	"One Man, One Heart"	Mark Spiro, Dann Huff	4:20
5.	"House on Fire"	Walsh, Morse, Ezrin, Ehart	4:42
6.	"Once in a Lifetime"	Antonina Armato, Dennis Morgan, Albert Hammond	4:14

Side two
No.	Title	Writer(s)	Length
7.	"Stand Beside Me"	Marc Jordan, Bruce Gaitsch	3:28
8.	"I Counted on Love"	Morse, Walsh	3:33
9.	"The Preacher"	Walsh, Morse	4:18
10.	"Rainmaker"	Walsh, Morse, Ezrin	6:44
11.	"T.O. Witcher" (instrumental)	Morse	1:39
12.	"Bells of Saint James"	Walsh, Morse	5:39

== Personnel ==
Kansas

- Steve Walsh - keyboards, lead vocals
- Steve Morse - guitars, vocals
- Rich Williams - guitars
- Billy Greer - bass, vocals
- Phil Ehart - drums, co-producer on tracks 4, 6 and 7

Additional personnel

- Greg Robert - keyboard programming, background vocals
- Christopher Yavelow - Kurzweil synthesizer sound design
- Ricky Keller - percussion programming on track 2, keyboards programming on track 4
- Steve Croes - Synclavier
- Terry Brock - background vocals on track 4
- John Pierce - fretless bass on track 7
- Bob Ezrin - percussion, vocals, background vocals
- Rev. James Cleveland and the Southern California Community Choir - background vocals on tracks 2, 9 and 10

Production

- Bob Ezrin - producer, engineer, mixing, arrangements with Kansas
- Greg Ladanyi - co-producer on tracks 4, 6 and 7, engineer, mixing
- Garth Richardson - engineer, mixing
- Stan Katayama, Bob Loftus, Brendan O'Brien - engineers
- Lawrence Fried, Edd Miller - assistant engineers
- Stephen Marcussen, Doug Sax, Mike Reese - mastering
- Robert Hrycyna - production and technical supervisor
- Jack Adams - equipment assistant
- Storm Thorgerson - art direction
- Paul Maxon - photography, photography production
- Tony May, Glenn Wexler, Derek Burnett - photography
- Jon Crossland - stylist

== Charts ==
Chart (1988)	Peak position
US Billboard 200	114
