= Works in Progress (Kansas album) =

Compilation album & DVD by Kansas
- Released: May 23, 2006
- Genre: Progressive rock
- Length: 68:15
- Label: Compendia Intersound

Kansas chronology
Sail On: The 30th Anniversary Collection (2004)	Works in Progress (2006)	There's Know Place Like Home (2009)

Professional ratings
Review scores
Source	Rating
AllMusic	2.5/5 stars

Works in Progress is a CD/DVD release from the band Kansas, bringing together songs from the last ten years (1992–2002) of the band's career, featuring music from Live at the Whisky, Freaks of Nature, and Device – Voice – Drum. In addition, the companion DVD collects a number of live performances originally featured on Live at the Whisky and Device – Voice – Drum. The title is a pun based on their progressive rock genre.

== Track listing ==
=== CD ===
1. "Mysteries & Mayhem" (from Live at the Whisky) - 8:25
2. "Portrait (He Knew)" (from Live at the Whisky) - 5:38
3. "Down the Road" (from Live at the Whisky) - 5:51
4. "Black Fathom 4" (from Freaks of Nature) - 5:54
5. "Freaks of Nature" (from Freaks of Nature) - 4:07
6. "Under the Knife" (from Freaks of Nature) - 5:00
7. "I Can Fly" (from Freaks of Nature) - 5:21
8. "Peaceful and Warm" (from Freaks of Nature) - 6:47
9. "The Wall" (from Always Never the Same) - 5:30
10. "Cheyenne Anthem" (from Always Never the Same) - 7:30
11. "Hold On" (from Always Never the Same) - 4:15
12. "Dust in the Wind" (from Always Never the Same) - 3:57

=== DVD ===
1. "Intro"
2. "Belexes"
3. "Icarus II"
4. "Icarus I"
5. "M & M"
6. "Portrait"
7. "Down the Road"
8. "Hold On"
9. "Dust in the Wind"

== Personnel ==
- Steve Walsh: lead vocals, keyboards
- Billy Greer: bass guitar, backup vocals
- Rich Williams: electric and acoustic guitars
- David Ragsdale: violin on recordings from Freaks of Nature and Live at the Whisky
- Phil Ehart: drums
- Robby Steinhardt: violin, lead and backup vocals on recordings from Device – Voice – Drum and Always Never the Same
- Greg Robert: keyboards and backup vocals on recordings from Freaks of Nature and Live at the Whisky
