= Portrait (He Knew) =

Song by Kansas

- German single cover

Single by Kansas

from the album Point of Know Return
- B-side: "Lightning's Hand"
- Released: May 1978
- Recorded: 1977
- Genre: Progressive rock, Hard rock
- Length: 4:30
- Songwriters: Kerry Livgren, Steve Walsh

Kansas singles chronology
"Dust in the Wind"	"Portrait (He Knew)"	"People of the South Wind"

"Portrait (He Knew)" is a song by the American progressive rock band Kansas. It was written by Kerry Livgren and Steve Walsh and was recorded for the band's fifth album, Point of Know Return. The song was also released as a single after the success of "Point of Know Return" and "Dust in the Wind" and charted at #64 on the Billboard Hot 100. It was later released on the live and compilation albums Two for the Show, Live at the Whisky, Device, Voice, Drum, The Kansas Boxed Set, The Ultimate Kansas, Sail On: The 30th Anniversary Collection, Works in Progress, and Playlist: The Very Best of Kansas. It appears in a number of different mixes and lengths: the original album version, the edited single version, a different single edit that appears as a bonus track on the European-only 1999 compilation Definitive Collection, and a new remix by original producer Jeff Glixman, issued as a bonus track on the 2002 CD remaster of its original parent album. It was also released on the DVDs of Device, Voice, Drum and Works in Progress.

== Background ==
The inspiration for the song came from Kerry Livgren's admiration for Albert Einstein. He wrote the lyrics in a time when he was going through a spiritual transitional phase in his life, and after converting to Christianity, he re-recorded the song with his band AD, modifying the lyrics to make them fit the story of Jesus Christ and retitling the song "Portrait II".

== Reception ==
Billboard described "Portrait (He Knew)" as "a rivieting, snarling rock number which winds up in a frenzied rock climax." Cash Box said that "a strong bobbing beat provides a romping backdrop for the excellent and melodic singing." Record World said that it "continues the serious – some would say religious – lyrical concerns of the hit 'Dust In The Wind,' but returns to Kansas' more familiar, rocking style." Ultimate Classic Rock critic Eduardo Rivadavia rated "Portrait (He Knew)" as Kansas' 8th greatest song, saying it "exemplifies the sort of cerebral subject matter that inspired the group at the start of its career." I Love Classic Rock rated as one of the "Top 10 Kansas Songs Everyone Should Hear At Least Once In Their Lives" and said that it "tackles the subject of the mind, which spurred on to fan the interests of the band in its earlier years."

== Charts ==
Chart (1978)	Peak position
US Billboard Hot 100	64
US Adult Contemporary (Billboard)	62
