= Native Window =

- Origin: Topeka, Kansas, United States
- Genres: Progressive rock
- Years active: 2009
- Spinoff of: Kansas
- Members: Phil Ehart; Billy Greer; Rich Williams; David Ragsdale

Native Window was an American progressive rock spin-off band of the popular rock group Kansas.

== Discography ==
1. Native Window (2009)
