= Play the Game Tonight =

Single by Kansas

from the album Vinyl Confessions
- B-side: "Play On"
- Released: May 1982
- Recorded: 1981–1982
- Genre: Progressive rock, pop rock
- Length: 3:26
- Label: Kirshner, Legacy/Epic
- Songwriters: Phil Ehart, Danny Flower, Rob Frazier, Kerry Livgren, Rich Williams
- Producers: Kansas, Ken Scott

Kansas singles chronology
"Got to Rock On" (1981)	"Play the Game Tonight" (1982)	"Right Away" (1982)

Music video
- "Play the Game Tonight" on YouTube

"Play the Game Tonight" is a progressive rock single recorded by Kansas for their 1982 album Vinyl Confessions. It managed to chart at No. 17 on the Billboard Hot 100 chart (where it remained for 3 weeks), becoming the 15th single, 10th top 100 hit, sixth top 40 hit, and the third of four Top 20 hits produced by Kansas.

The song was recorded during the John Elefante period of Kansas and was on the first of two albums to be produced during that period (the other being Drastic Measures). The original version was written by outside songwriters, and members of Kansas modified the lyrics and received co-writers’ credit. The song has been included on several live and compilation albums, including The Best of Kansas, The Ultimate Kansas, Sail On: The 30th Anniversary Collection, and the Device, Voice, Drum live CD/DVD combo.

== Structure ==
The song begins with a slow, mysterious piano intro played by John Elefante, which continues playing as Elefante comes in on vocals, singing the first verse. As the verse progresses to the end, there is an increase in volume leading up to the chorus, where Elefante is backed by Robby Steinhardt, Dave Hope, Kerry Livgren, and Roger Taylor on vocals. The same structure repeats with the second verse and chorus, leading up to a violin solo by Steinhardt, progressing into the third and final chorus. On the album Vinyl Confessions, a follow-up to the song, "Play On", is played near the end of the album.

== Reception ==
Cash Box described "Play the Game Tonight" as "a stormy- slice of ornate pop/rock, moving from a quiet 'Dust In The Wind'-type opening to a marching chorus."

== Music video ==
The music video depicts, in between the band playing the song, a chess game played by two hooded beings. One is dressed in white and represents Life and Mankind's greatest achievements (a baby developing in a womb and a Moon landing (Apollo 11 ?) is seen in two clippings), while the other wears black and is meant to represent Death and Destruction (as seen by clips of a military landing (war) and a nuclear explosion). The pieces in the chess set are characters from J.R.R. Tolkien's The Lord of the Rings. At the end of the video, the chess piece that is the rook, on the side of the figure in white, makes a move across the board to the king piece of the figure in black; putting him into either check or checkmate, as the camera zooms out and the black figure pauses, before the video fades out.

== Personnel ==
- John Elefante - lead vocals
- Robby Steinhardt - backing vocals, violin
- Kerry Livgren - piano, backing vocals
- Rich Williams - guitar
- Dave Hope - bass guitar
- Phil Ehart - drums

== Charts ==
Chart (1982)	Peak position
Canada Top Singles (RPM)	35
US Billboard Hot 100	17
US Mainstream Rock Airplay (Billboard)	4
