= Carry On Wayward Son =

1976 single by Kansas

Single by Kansas

from the album Leftoverture
- B-side: "Questions of My Childhood"
- Released: November 19, 1976
- Studio: Studio in the Country
- Genre: Progressive rock; hard rock
- Length: 5:26 (album version); 4:38 ("50 years" album version); 3:26 (single edit)
- Label: Kirshner
- Songwriter: Kerry Livgren
- Producers: Jeff Glixman; Kansas

Kansas singles chronology
"It Takes a Woman's Love (To Make a Man)" (1976)	"Carry On Wayward Son" (1976)	"What's on My Mind" (1976)

Music video
- "Carry On Wayward Son" on YouTube

"Carry On Wayward Son" is a song by American rock band Kansas, released on their 1976 studio album, Leftoverture. Written by guitarist Kerry Livgren, the song became the band's first top 40 hit, reaching No. 11 on the US Billboard Hot 100 in early 1977.

The song has since remained a classic rock radio staple and a signature song for the band.

== Background ==
While Kansas' previous three albums had split songwriting duties between lead vocalist Steve Walsh and band member Kerry Livgren, the latter essentially provided all the material for the band's fourth album release, Leftoverture. According to Livgren, "On the very first day of rehearsals, Steve...said that he had nothing – not a single song. I don't relish that kind of pressure, but with hindsight it really brought out the best in me." Although based in Atlanta, Georgia, Kansas had returned to its Topeka, Kansas, hometown to work up material for what would be the Leftoverture album, the band rehearsing in a vacant store in a strip mall the material Livgren was working up on a Lowrey organ at his parents' home where he was staying. "Carry On Wayward Son" was written after the band had completed rehearsals. Livgren, who perceived the song as being "beamed down" to him in full, in 2004 stated: "It's an autobiographical song. Parallel to my musical career I've always been on a spiritual sojourn, looking for truth and meaning. It was a song of self-encouragement. I was telling myself to keep on looking and I would find what I sought." Livgren was born again on July 25, 1979, and since 1980 recorded primarily as a Christian rock artist.

When it came out, there was nothing like it. [It has] so many musically interesting parts. It wasn't rubber-stamped; it was unique to itself. It's a great sing-along. It had a lot of things going for it. When we recorded it, we knew we had a great song.

...we didn't realize what it would turn into. It's become part of rock-&-roll culture. But then it seemed like a fluke. It was the right song at the right time.

— Kansas guitarist Rich Williams on the song's impact and enduring appeal

Drummer Phil Ehart recalled that Livgren mentioned a new song as Kansas was packing up to leave Topeka for Studio in the Country, the Louisiana facility where Leftoverture was recorded from December 1975, with Livgren presenting "Carry On Wayward Son" to his bandmates only after they had reached the studio. According to Livgren "It was the last night we were in Topeka. I came into the studio on the last day and said, ‘I think you better hear this one’. The guys looked at each other and said, ‘We gotta do this’." In 2004, Ehart recalled, "It was the last, last [song] to be submitted for...Leftoverture...I can't even remember if we dropped something else to get [it] on there...[When] we recorded it, we didn't really think it would be a hit [as] it was about six minutes long...We were on the road [in December 1976 when] our manager...said: 'Well, you're not gonna believe this, but we actually have a hit song.' We said, 'What?' He said, 'Yeah. "Carry On Wayward Son" is shooting up the charts.' And it barely made it on the album!"

Kansas' other guitarist Rich Williams indicated in 2004 that the success of "Carry On Wayward Son" was not a total surprise to the band: "As far as knowing what a hit was, we didn't have any idea. But we knew there was something special about ['Carry On Wayward Son']. It was very easy to listen to but still very different."

== Release and impact ==
Subsequent to the October 21, 1976, release of the Leftoverture album, the track "Carry On Wayward Son" became an FM radio favorite, causing the November 23 single release of a 3:26 edit of the 5:26 album track (itself trimmed from 7:30 minutes). Many Top 40 stations aired — and today’s Classic Rock stations continue to air — the full album cut rather than the single edit.

Debuting at No. 86 on the Billboard Hot 100 dated December 25, 1976, "Carry On Wayward Son" reached the top 40 — at No. 36 — seven weeks later, the single in its first months of release typically garnering attention in what could be termed secondary markets being "added" by major market radio stations such as WABC-AM (NYC) and KHJ-AM (LA) only in March 1977. Ultimately "Carry On Wayward Son" reached a chart peak of No. 11 on the Hot 100 dated April 2, 1977: Internationally the single reached No. 5 in Canada, No. 51 in the UK and No. 58 in Australia All initial releases of the single had "Questions of My Childhood" as the B-side.

"Carry On Wayward Son" was later included on almost all Kansas compilation albums (except for Works in Progress) and was heard on all Kansas live albums. It was certified gold by the RIAA for sales of 500,000 units on December 18, 1990, and reached quadruple platinum, or 4 million, on November 26, 2019. "Carry On Wayward Son" is 96th on VH1's 100 Greatest Hard Rock Songs.

Ultimate Classic Rock critic Eduardo Rivadavia rated "Carry On Wayward Son" as Kansas's greatest song, saying it "combines their progressive and commercial instincts" and "fluidly shifts between studied technique and an infectious melody, culminating in a soaring chorus." Classic Rock critic Dave Ling also ranked it as Kansas' greatest song.

== Personnel ==
- Steve Walsh – lead vocals, piano, organ
- Robby Steinhardt – backing vocals
- Kerry Livgren – guitar, piano
- Rich Williams – acoustic and electric guitar
- Dave Hope – bass
- Phil Ehart – drums

== Charts ==
Chart (1976–1978)	Peak position
Australian Singles (Kent Music Report)	58
Canada Top Singles (RPM)	5
UK Singles (Official Charts)	51
US Billboard Hot 100	11

Chart (2022)	Peak position
Hungary (Single Top 40)	13

== Certifications ==
Region	Certification	Certified units/sales
Germany (BVMI)	Gold	250,000^{‡}
New Zealand (RMNZ)	2× Platinum	60,000^{‡}
United Kingdom (BPI)	Platinum	600,000^{‡}
United States (RIAA)	4× Platinum	4,000,000^{‡}
^{‡} Sales+streaming figures based on certification alone.

== Cover versions ==
- In 2016, American heavy metal band Anthrax released a cover version of the song on their Limited Edition Box Set of the album For All Kings, and in 2017 as a 12-inch maxi-single with "Black Math" on the B-side.
- In 2018, American female duo Neoni released a reimagined cover version of the single that ended the series finale of Supernatural, "Carry On". The original had previously been featured in nearly every season finale of the series.
