= David Ragsdale =

American musician

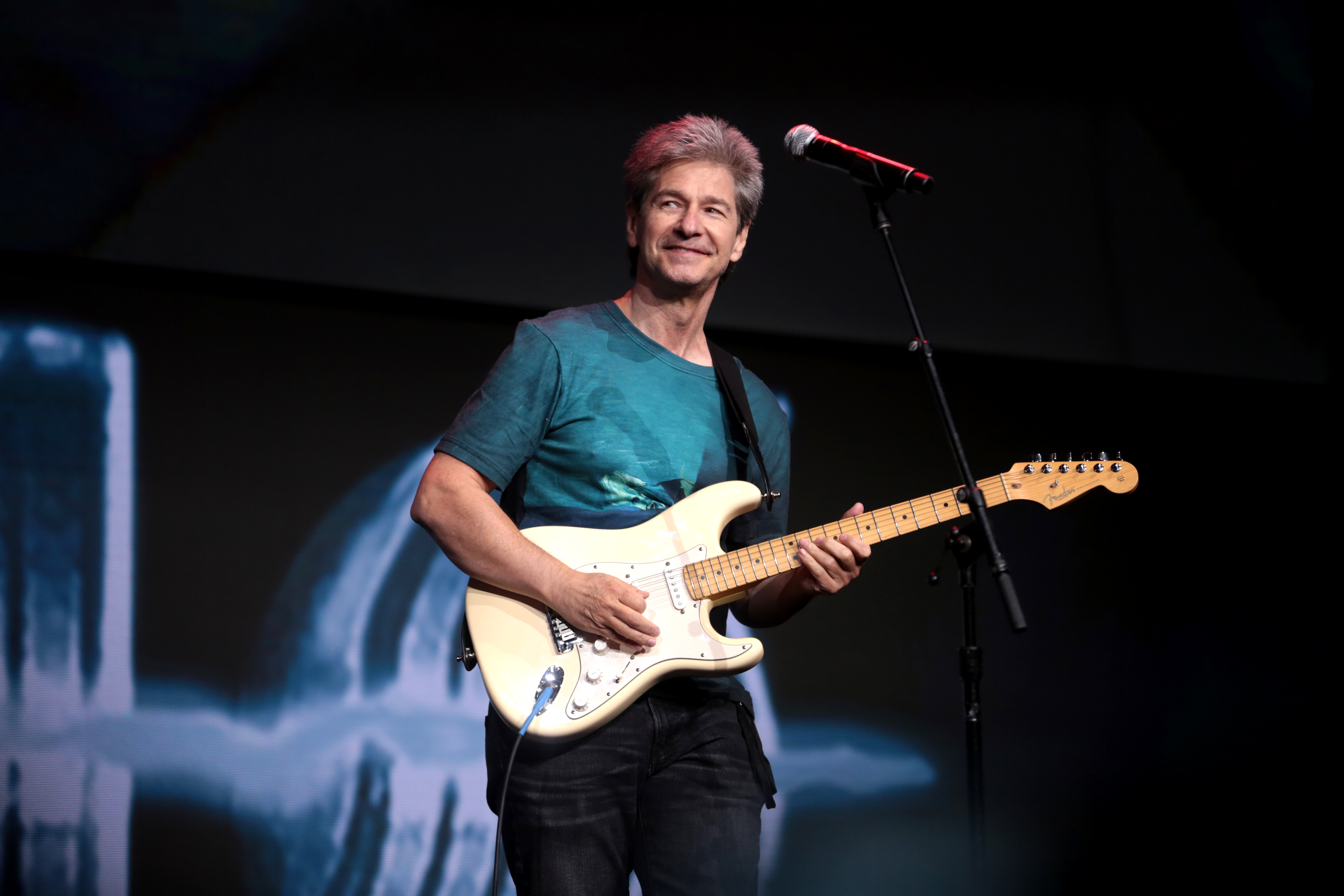
- Ragsdale performing with Kansas in 2017.

Background information
- Born: April 3, 1958 (age 68); Columbus, Georgia, United States
- Genres: Rock, progressive rock
- Occupation: Musician
- Instruments: Violin; guitar
- Years active: 1980–present

David Lasater Ragsdale (born April 3, 1958) is an American musician. He is best known as the violinist and guitarist for the rock band Kansas from 1991 to 1997 and from 2006 to 2023. He toured for four years with Louise Mandrell before joining Kansas, and he released a solo album in 1997. Ragsdale has appeared as a guest artist with various other bands.

== Early life ==
Ragsdale was born into a musical family. He started violin at the age of three at the insistence of his mother, training in classical music. At around 13 years old, he picked up the guitar to express himself through rock music, because he had not heard violin in rock. At the age of 16 in 1974, as he was getting more proficient on guitar, Ragsdale heard the song "Can I Tell You" from the Kansas album Kansas, featuring the hard-rocking violin of Robby Steinhardt. Ragsdale realized that the violin could be prominent in rock, and his interest in violin was renewed.

In 1980, Ragsdale entered the University of Tulsa on a music scholarship. He studied violin with Paris-trained Nell Gotkovsky, aiming to become a symphony violinist. He played with the Tulsa Philharmonic during his college years, and earned a Bachelor of Arts degree in music.

== Career ==
After college, Ragsdale moved to Nashville to pursue a music career, and eventually joined country music singer Louise Mandrell on tour for four years in the late 1980s. In January 1987, Mandrell performed with her band in New York City on The Tonight Show Starring Johnny Carson. During this visit, Ragsdale stayed with a hometown friend who was working in New York, and the friend played for him the 1986 Kansas album Power. Ragsdale felt that the album was missing violin sounds, so he arranged a violin part and made a new recording with his own violin mixed in. Kansas member Phil Ehart heard a cassette tape of the recording and phoned Ragsdale to praise it, but Ehart did not ask Ragsdale to join the band at that time. Ragsdale kept in touch for the next four years, sending Ehart copies of his best work.

Ragsdale left Mandrell's tour in 1989 and moved to Los Angeles where he played rock music. Ehart phoned him there in early 1991, inviting him to record violin with the band at a studio in Atlanta. After a few weeks of sessions, the band welcomed Ragsdale as a full member, to begin touring that summer. He appeared on the band's 1992 album Live at the Whisky, the 1994 song "Wheels" (the final track of The Kansas Boxed Set), and the 1995 album Freaks of Nature. One of Ragsdale's favorite contributions was on the latter album, the song "Black Fathom 4".

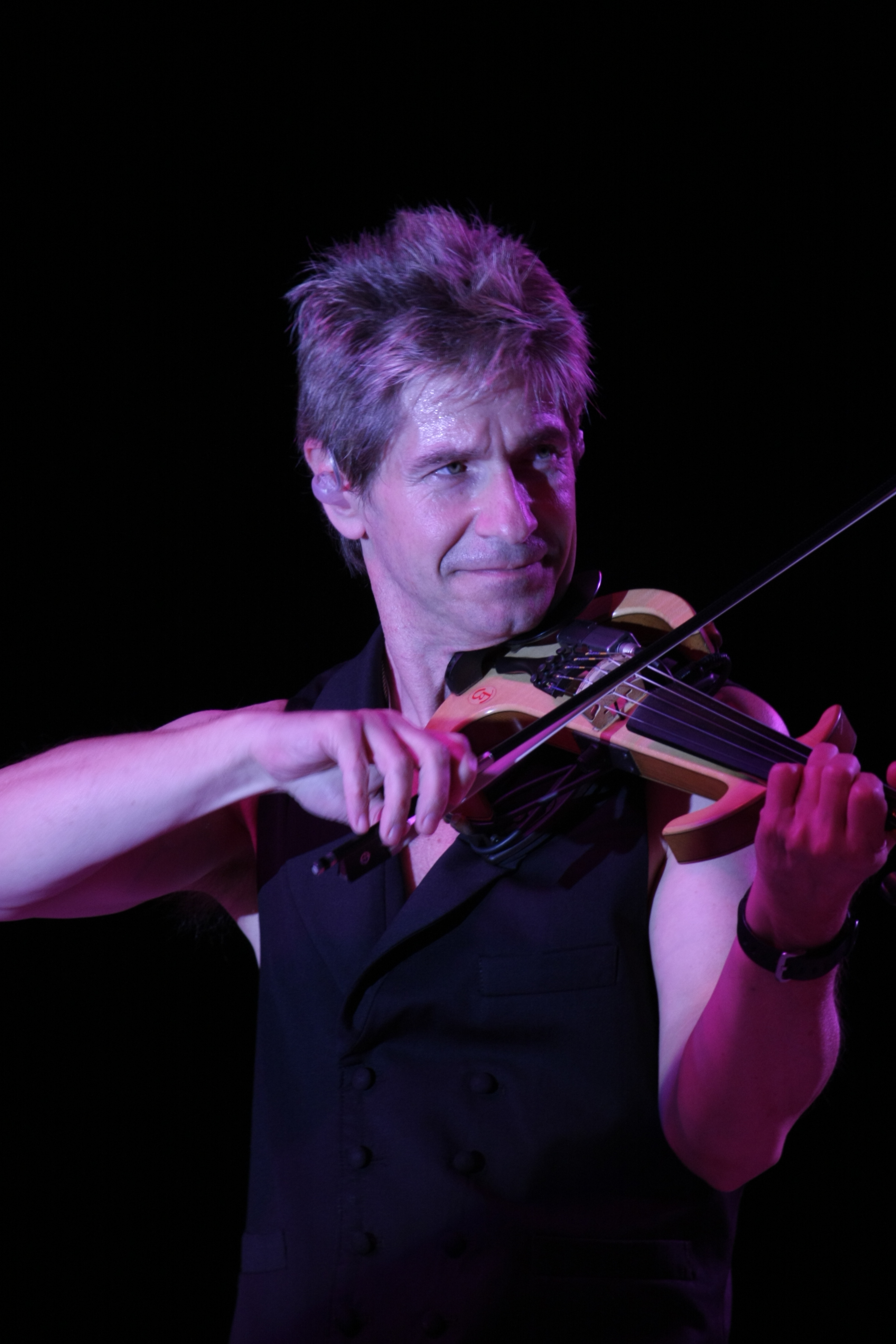
Ragsdale playing the violin with Kansas in 2008.

While with Kansas, Ragsdale participated in recordings with the Smashing Pumpkins (two songs on Siamese Dream), Jason Bonham's 1994 Motherland project (the song "Y" from Peace 4 Me), and with Queensrÿche on the song "Sign of the Times".

Weary of touring, Ragsdale left Kansas in 1997 and released a solo album, David and Goliath. (The album was reissued in November 2006 after he rejoined Kansas.) He moved to Las Vegas, Nevada, and played in rock theater shows.

In 2006, Ragsdale rejoined Kansas to replace the retiring Steinhardt. Ragsdale toured extensively, and performed on the Kansas albums There's Know Place Like Home (2009), The Prelude Implicit (2016) and The Absence of Presence (2020).

On May 22, 2023, Kansas announced on their website that Ragsdale was leaving the band.

== Musical style ==
In his youth, Ragsdale was inspired by gypsy jazz violinist Stéphane Grappelli as well as electric jazz violinists Jean-Luc Ponty and Jerry Goodman. Robby Steinhardt of Kansas was a major influence on Ragsdale. Even though he played fiddle-style country music with Mandrell, he does not consider himself a fiddler.

Ragsdale has played violin from the age of three, and guitar from his teens. Starting in the late 1980s, he has played an unusual five-string acoustic violin made by Seman Violins in Skokie, Illinois. He often plays a Steinberger electric guitar. One experimental violin he played was a prototype headless electric model handcrafted in graphite composite by Ned Steinberger; in September 1991 this "priceless one-of-a-kind" prototype was stolen from Ragsdale's backstage dressing room at Showcase in Raleigh, North Carolina.

== Discography ==
=== Solo ===
- David and Goliath – (Renaissance Records, 1997)

=== With Kansas ===
- Live at the Whisky – (1992)
- The Kansas Boxed Set – (1994) on the new track "Wheels"
- Freaks of Nature – (1995)
- There's Know Place Like Home – (2009)
- The Prelude Implicit – (2016)
- The Absence of Presence – (2020)

=== Guest ===
- The Smashing Pumpkins: Siamese Dream – "Disarm" and "Luna" (1993)
- Motherland: Peace 4 Me – "Y" (1994)
- Kerry Livgren and Corps de Pneuma: When Things Get Electric – (1995)
- Queensrÿche: Hear in the Now Frontier – (1997) (on "Sign of the Times")
- Salem Hill: The Robbery of Murder (1998)
- John Elefante: On My Way to the Sun – (2013) (on "This Is How the Story Goes")
- Seventh Key: I Will Survive - (2013) (on "Sea of Dreams" and "What Love's Supposed To Be")
- Glass Hammer: Ode to Echo (2014)
- Spock's Beard: The Oblivion Particle (2015)
