= Song for America =

Studio album by Kansas
- Released: February 1975
- Recorded: December 1974
- Studio: Wally Heider's Studio 3 (Hollywood)
- Genres: Progressive rock; hard rock
- Length: 45:08
- Labels: Kirshner (US); Epic (rest of the world)
- Producers: Jeff Glixman, Wally Gold

Kansas chronology
| Kansas (1974) | Song for America (1975) | Masque (1975) |

Singles from Song for America
- 1. "Song for America" Released: April 1975

Song for America is the second studio album by American progressive rock band Kansas, released in 1975. The album was reissued in remastered format on CD in 2004. The 10-minute title track was edited down to three minutes for release as a single. The 45 R.P.M. edit resurfaced 29 years later as a bonus track on the remastered release, which provided improved sound as well as expanded liner notes, rare photos, and a live version of "Down the Road".

== Reception ==
Professional ratings
Review scores
| Source | Rating |
|---|---|
| AllMusic | 3/5 stars |
| MusicHound Rock | 3/5 |
| The Rolling Stone Album Guide | 1/5 stars |
| Sea of Tranquility | 5/5 stars |

AllMusic, in a retrospective review, praised the "intense energy" of the album's shorter songs, but contended that the longer songs require too much active listening to appreciate. They concluded that the album is "a good (if not adolescent) recording for a group of this genre." Conversely, Gary Graff described the title track as "one of prog-rock's sonic gems," recommending the album to "Those interested in Kansas at its most bombastic."

Steve Pettengill, writing for Sea of Tranquility webzine, describes the album as "full tilt symphonic rock with none of the stadium rock numbers that would pop up on later albums. Comprising four lengthy intricate pieces and two very American style romps, Kansas' second album very admirably showcases the band's trademark duality as proggers and rockers."

Ranking on the Billboard album chart with a peak of #57, Song for America would in the months subsequent to its February 1975 release sell approximately 250,000 units. Like all three of Kansas' first three album releases, Song for America attracted new commercial interest due to the platinum success of the band's fourth and fifth studio albums: Leftoverture (1976) and Point of Know Return (1977). Reported as having sold between 300,000 and 400,000 units in January 1978, Song for America would be certified Gold for sales of 500,000 units in June 1980.

== Track listing ==
Side one
| No. | Title | Writer(s) | Lead vocals | Length |
|---|---|---|---|---|
| 1. | "Down the Road" | Steve Walsh, Kerry Livgren | Steinhardt | 3:43 |
| 2. | "Song for America" | Livgren | Walsh and Steinhardt | 10:03 |
| 3. | "Lamplight Symphony" | Livgren | Walsh and Steinhardt | 8:17 |

Side two
| No. | Title | Writer(s) | Lead vocals | Length |
|---|---|---|---|---|
| 4. | "Lonely Street" | Walsh, Dave Hope, Rich Williams, Phil Ehart | Walsh | 5:43 |
| 5. | "The Devil Game" | Walsh, Hope | Walsh | 5:04 |
| 6. | "Incomudro - Hymn to the Atman" | Livgren | Walsh | 12:11 |

Bonus tracks on 2004 CD reissue
| No. | Title | Length |
|---|---|---|
| 7. | "Song for America" (Single edit) | 3:02 |
| 8. | "Down the Road" (Live at the Agora Ballroom, Cleveland, Ohio, 1975) | 3:53 |

Bonus tracks on Japan Blu-spec 2011 CD reissue
| No. | Title | Length |
|---|---|---|
| 9. | "Incomudro - Hymn to the Atman" (Live) | 16:10 |

== Personnel ==
Kansas

- Steve Walsh – organ, ARP and Moog synthesizers, lead vocals
- Kerry Livgren – electric and rhythm guitars, Moog and ARP synthesizers, ARP strings, piano (except on "Down the Road")
- Robby Steinhardt – violin, backing vocals, lead vocals
- Rich Williams – electric, acoustic, and rhythm guitars
- Dave Hope – bass guitar
- Phil Ehart – drums, glockenspiel on "Song for America", Moog drum and gong on "Incomudro - Hymn to the Atman"

Production

- Jeff Glixman – producer, remastered edition producer
- Wally Gold – producer
- Peter Granet – engineer
- Tom Rabstenek – mastering
- Ed Lee – art direction
- Peter Lloyd – cover painting
- Jeff Magid – remastered edition producer

== Charts ==
| Chart (1975) | Peak position |
|---|---|
| US Billboard 200 | 57 |

== Certifications ==
| Region | Certification | Certified units/sales |
|---|---|---|
| United States (RIAA) | Gold | 500,000^{^} |
^{^} Shipments figures based on certification alone.
