= Hold On (Kansas song) =

Single by Kansas

from the album Audio-Visions
- Released: September 1980
- Recorded: 1979
- Genre: Progressive rock, Christian rock
- Length: 3:53
- Label: Kirshner
- Songwriter(s): Kerry Livgren
- Producer(s): Kansas

Kansas singles chronology
"Reason to Be" (1979)	"Hold On" (1980)	"Got to Rock On" (1981)

"Hold On" is a single by the progressive rock band Kansas. It was the band's 13th single, eighth top 100 hit, and fifth top 40 hit, peaking at number 40. The song was first released on the 1980 album Audio-Visions, which was the last album recorded with the original band before Steve Walsh left. The song was written by Kerry Livgren to try to convince his wife to convert to Christianity along with him, which proved successful and the couple have remained active in their faith ever since. It was further re-released on several compilation and live albums, including The Best of Kansas, The Kansas Boxed Set, The Ultimate Kansas, Sail On: The 30th Anniversary Collection, Live at the Whisky, and the CD/DVD combos of Device, Voice, Drum, Works in Progress, and There's Know Place Like Home. An orchestral version of the song appears on the album Always Never the Same, recorded with the London Symphony Orchestra.

Record World called it a "ballad with a recurring surge of power at the hook" and praised "Steve Walsh's dynamic vocals."

== Charts ==
Chart (1980)	Peak position
US Billboard Hot 100	40
