= Ronnie Platt =

American singer (born 1962)

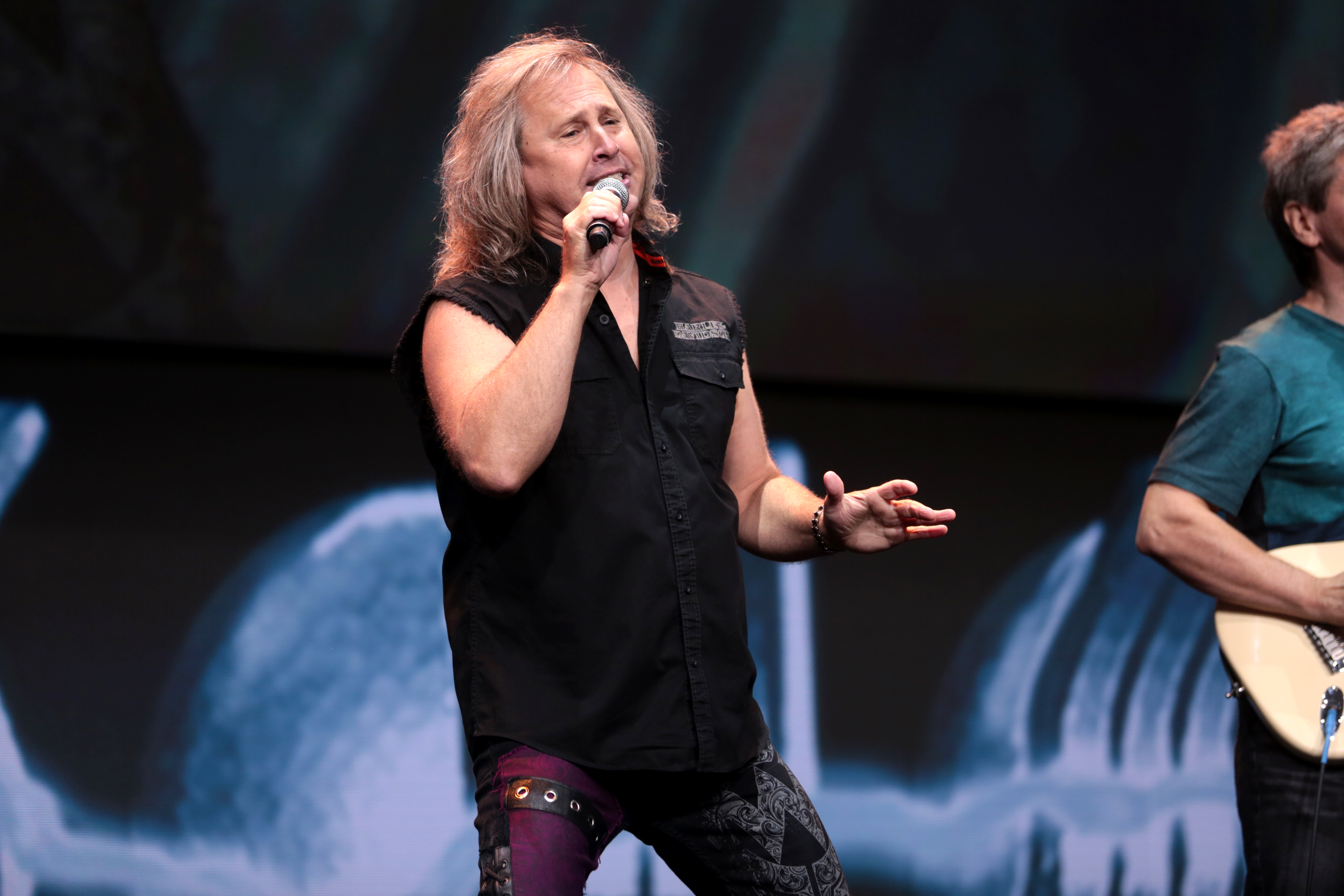
- Platt in 2017

Background information
- Born: February 24, 1962 (age 64)
- Occupation: Singer
- Years active: 2007–present

Ronald Platt (born February 24, 1962) is an American singer who is best known as the current lead singer for the rock band Kansas since 2014, after Steve Walsh's retirement. He is also the former lead singer of the band Shooting Star.

Platt started his career as a truck driver before joining Shooting Star in 2007. He also played with various cover bands in Chicago. After Walsh retired from Kansas in 2014, Platt messaged lead guitarist Rich Williams on Facebook and asked to be considered for the position. Platt ultimately took over lead vocals and keyboard. In 2016, he appeared on his first Kansas album, The Prelude Implicit.

== Health ==
In February 2025, Platt was diagnosed with thyroid cancer and he survived after his thyroid cancer was surgically removed.
