= All I Wanted (Kansas song) =

Single by Kansas

from the album Power
- B-side: "We're Not Alone Anymore"
- Released: October 1986
- Recorded: 1986
- Genre: Soft rock; synth-pop
- Length: 3:20
- Label: MCA
- Songwriters: Steve Walsh, Steve Morse
- Producer: Andrew Powell

Kansas singles chronology
"Perfect Lover" (1984)	"All I Wanted" (1986)	"Power" (1987)

"All I Wanted" is a single by the band Kansas. The song was released on the band's 1986 album Power and written by Steve Walsh and Steve Morse.

== Background ==
It was their seventh and final Top 40 appearance, charting at #19 on the Billboard Hot 100 chart. The song takes a more pop approach than the band's previous songs.

== Reception ==
Billboard said that it's "synth-based and relatively mellow." Cash Box called it a "... blustery mainstream rock ballad. Well crafted melodies, flawless production and sterling musicianship are featured."

== Charts ==
Chart (1986–1987)	Peak position
Canada Top Singles (RPM)	75
Canada Adult Contemporary (RPM)	10
US Billboard Hot 100	19
US Adult Contemporary (Billboard)	14
US Mainstream Rock (Billboard)	10
