= Masque (Kansas album) =

Studio album by Kansas
- Released: September 1975
- Recorded: 1975
- Studios: Studio in the Country, Bogalusa, Louisiana
- Genres: Hard rock; progressive rock
- Length: 40:44
- Labels: Kirshner (US); Epic (rest of the world)
- Producer: Jeff Glixman

Kansas chronology
Song for America (1975)	Masque (1975)	Leftoverture (1976)

Singles from Masque
- 1. "It Takes a Woman's Love" Released: February 1976

Masque is the third studio album by American progressive rock band Kansas. The album was released in September 1975, remastered for CD in 2001, and again remastered and reissued on vinyl in 2014. The opening track, "It Takes a Woman's Love (To Make a Man)", was remixed for release as a single, including additional guest vocals and segments far different from the album version, but was not popular. The album includes both songs in the epic progressive rock style which Kansas favored and songs which took the heartland rock elements of their sound in a pop-oriented direction, foreshadowing their next album Leftoverture, on which those two approaches were more integrated.

Masque peaked at #70 on the Billboard album chart, and approximately 250,000 units were sold within months. Like all three of Kansas' first three album releases, Masque attracted new commercial interest due to the platinum success of the band's fourth and fifth studio albums (Leftoverture and Point of Know Return), being certified Gold for sales of 500,000 units in December 1977.

== Background and recording ==
Masque was written and recorded at a time when Kansas were unsure of their band identity. Guitarist/Keyboardist Kerry Livgren commented, "There's the really progressive side of the band and then on the other end of the spectrum there's something like 'It Takes a Woman's Love'. You put those on the same album, and it's like 'Who are these guys?' We wondered that too." "It Takes a Woman's Love" was written specifically to appease record label owner Don Kirshner's demands for the band to produce a song with the potential to be a hit single.

The sessions were produced by longtime Kansas associate Jeff Glixman (Masque was the first Kansas album produced solely by him) and held at Studio in the Country. The brand new studio was described by drummer Phil Ehart as "way out in the bayous", and during recording sessions alligators and armadillos wandered into the studio. Relations between the band members were strong, and they commented in later years that the struggle to make Kansas a success forged a tight bond between them.

Neither of the two bonus tracks on the 2001 CD reissue were taken from the Masque sessions; they were included because they are early recordings of songs which later appeared on Masque. Specifically, the bonus cut of "Child of Innocence" was recorded at a band rehearsal in Topeka, Kansas, and the bonus cut of "It's You" was recorded at a studio in Tulsa, Oklahoma as part of a studio session that was not for a specific album.

== Reception ==
Professional ratings
Review scores
Source	Rating
AllMusic	3.5/5 stars
MusicHound Rock	4/5
The Rolling Stone Album Guide	1/5 stars

In a retrospective review, Bret Adams of Allmusic said that Masque "foreshadows the tight melodies and instrumental interplay on the next two albums, Leftoverture and Point of Know Return, which together serve as the peak of Kansas's vision." He remarked that Robby Steinhardt's violin work stood as distinctive from other progressive rock violinists, and praised the bleak lyrics and combination of satisfying rock with dense progressive arrangements on individual songs such as "Two Cents Worth", "Icarus - Borne on Wings of Steel", and "Mysteries and Mayhem".

== Track listing ==
Side one
No.	Title	Writer(s)	Lead vocals	Length
1.	"It Takes a Woman's Love (To Make a Man)"	Steve Walsh	Walsh	3:08
2.	"Two Cents Worth"	Kerry Livgren, Walsh	Walsh	3:08
3.	"Icarus - Borne on Wings of Steel"	Livgren	Walsh	6:03
4.	"All the World"	Walsh, Robby Steinhardt	Walsh and Steinhardt	7:11

Side two
No.	Title	Writer(s)	Lead vocals	Length
5.	"Child of Innocence"	Livgren	Walsh and Steinhardt	4:36
6.	"It's You"	Walsh	Walsh	2:31
7.	"Mysteries and Mayhem"	Livgren, Walsh	Walsh and Steinhardt	4:18
8.	"The Pinnacle"	Livgren	Walsh and Steinhardt	9:44

Bonus tracks on 2001 CD reissue
No.	Title	Length
9.	"Child of Innocence" (Band rehearsal recording)	5:04
10.	"It's You" (Demo from a non-album recording session)	2:41

== Personnel ==
- Kansas
  - Steve Walsh – organ, piano, clavinet, Moog synthesizer, congas, lead and backing vocals
  - Kerry Livgren – lead and rhythm guitars, acoustic guitar, piano, clavinet, Moog and ARP synthesizers
  - Robby Steinhardt – violin, lead and backing vocals
  - Rich Williams – lead and rhythm guitars
  - Dave Hope – bass guitar
  - Phil Ehart – drums, percussion
- Additional musicians
  - Earl Lon Price – saxophone on track 1
- Production
  - Jeff Glixman – producer, remastered edition producer
  - Lee Peterzell – engineer
  - Jimmy Stroud – assistant engineer
  - Jeff Magid – remastered edition producer

== Charts ==
Chart (1976)	Peak position
US Billboard 200	70

== Certifications ==
Region	Certification	Certified units/sales
United States (RIAA)	Gold	500,000^{^}
^{^} Shipments figures based on certification alone.
