= Vinyl Confessions =

Studio album by Kansas
- Released: May 20, 1982
- Recorded: Late 1981/Early 1982
- Studio: Chateau Recorders, North Hollywood, California
- Genre: Pop rock; arena rock; progressive rock; Christian rock
- Length: 43:20
- Label: Kirshner
- Producer: Kansas, Ken Scott

Kansas chronology
Audio-Visions (1980)	Vinyl Confessions (1982)	Drastic Measures (1983)

Singles from Vinyl Confessions
- 1. "Play the Game Tonight" Released: June 1982 (US); 2. "Right Away" Released: August 1982

Vinyl Confessions is the eighth studio album by American rock band Kansas, released in 1982. It includes "Play the Game Tonight", which broke the Top 20 and is Kansas's third highest-charting single, surpassed only by "Carry on Wayward Son" and "Dust in the Wind". The album was reissued in remastered format on CD in 1996 on Legacy/Epic and again in 2011.

== Background ==
Vinyl Confessions was a major turning point for the band. After the conversion of both guitarist/keyboard player Kerry Livgren and bass player Dave Hope to Evangelical Christianity, and the focus that Livgren placed on his religion in the band's lyrics, lead singer Steve Walsh did not agree with the new direction of the band and left to form his own band, Streets. Walsh had also contributed much as a songwriter, so the band was forced to find a new lead singer who not only had a vocal style that fit the band's music, but also could contribute material for the upcoming album. After a long audition process, the choice came down to three strong candidates: Warren Ham, Michael Gleason and John Elefante. The band eventually settled on Elefante.

"Fair Exchange" described the world under the rule of the Anti-Christ, while "Chasing Shadows" pointed out the frustration in seeking anything outside Biblical truth. "Diamonds and Pearls" emphasized the value of spiritual wealth over financial wealth, while "Face It", "Windows" and "Borderline" all had strong evangelistic appeals to the listener. The album's closer, "Crossfire", made the album's position abundantly clear in its indirect reference to Jesus Christ ("the one who rose").

Vinyl Confessions did not go unnoticed by the nascent Contemporary Christian music (CCM) industry, which was just coming into its own at that time. Numerous Christian magazines trumpeted Kansas' new musical direction, and CCM Magazine even chose Vinyl Confessions as the No. 1 CCM album of 1982. All this attention created an entirely new audience of listeners for Kansas, but it also created further tensions within the band. Those tensions came to a head during the recording of their next album, Drastic Measures.

Queen drummer Roger Taylor was recording a solo album in the studio next door, and contributed background vocals on a handful of songs on the album.

Vinyl Confessions was also the last album with violinist/vocalist Robby Steinhardt, who left the band after the supporting tour and did not return until 1997.

== Reception ==
Professional ratings
Review scores
Source	Rating
AllMusic	3/5 stars
Melodic.net	5/5 stars
The Rolling Stone Album Guide	1.5/5 stars

While acknowledging the comeback success of the single "Play the Game Tonight", AllMusic's retrospective review was largely negative. They criticized the Christian lyrics as being "often of a judgmental, us-versus-you nature", and insinuated that the album fell more into a generic pop rock vein than Kansas's earlier albums ("it was getting hard to distinguish Kansas from Foreigner and Journey").

== Track listing ==
Side one
No.	Title	Writer(s)	Length
1.	"Play the Game Tonight"	Kerry Livgren, Rich Williams, Phil Ehart, Danny Flower, Rob Frazier	3:26
2.	"Right Away"	John Elefante, Dino Elefante	4:06
3.	"Fair Exchange"	Livgren	5:01
4.	"Chasing Shadows"	J. Elefante, D. Elefante	3:20
5.	"Diamonds and Pearls"	Livgren	4:50

Side two
No.	Title	Writer(s)	Length
6.	"Face It"	J. Elefante, D. Elefante	4:17
7.	"Windows"	Livgren	3:32
8.	"Borderline"	Livgren	4:00
9.	"Play On"	J. Elefante, Livgren	3:32
10.	"Crossfire"	Livgren	6:35

== Personnel ==
Kansas

- John Elefante – keyboards, lead vocals
- Kerry Livgren – guitar, keyboards, Synclavier programming
- Robby Steinhardt – violin, vocals, lead vocals on "Crossfire"
- Rich Williams – guitar
- Dave Hope – bass
- Phil Ehart – drums

Additional musicians

- Warren Ham – harmonica
- Bill Bergman – alto saxophone, tenor saxophone on tracks 2, 5 and 6
- Lee Thornburg, John Berry Jr. – trumpets on tracks 2 and 5
- Greg Smith – baritone saxophone on tracks 2 and 5
- Jim Coile – tenor saxophone on tracks 2 and 5
- Ben Dahlke – bassoon on track 5
- David Pack, Donna Williams – background vocals
- Roger Taylor – background vocals on "Right Away", "Diamonds and Pearls", "Play the Game Tonight"

Production

- Kansas – producer
- Ken Scott – producer, engineer
- Brian Leshon, David Spritz, Phil Jost, Ralph Sutton – assistant engineers
- Stan Ricker – mastering at Original Masteringworks/Mobile Fidelity Sound Lab, California
- Tom Drennon – art direction and design
- Andrew Barnum – additional art
- Glen Wexler – photography

== Charts ==
Chart (1982)	Peak position
German Albums (Offizielle Top 100)	36
US Billboard 200	16
