= Power (Kansas album) =

Studio album by Kansas
- Released: October 28, 1986
- Recorded: 1986
- Studios: The Castle, Franklin, Tennessee; Abbey Road Studios, London, England (orchestra recording)
- Genres: Hard rock, arena rock, pop rock
- Length: 39:29
- Label: MCA
- Producers: Andrew Powell, Phil Ehart

Kansas chronology
The Best of Kansas (1984)	Power (1986)	In the Spirit of Things (1988)

Singles from Power
- 1. "All I Wanted" Released: October 1986 (US); 2. "Power" Released: February 1987; 3. "Can't Cry Anymore" Released: April 1987

Power is the tenth studio album by American rock band Kansas, released in 1986. It was the band's first studio album for MCA Records. The album featured a new lineup, as the band reformed after a period of hiatus.

== Reception ==
Professional ratings
Review scores
Source	Rating
AllMusic	3/5 stars
Kerrang!	2.5/5 stars
The Rolling Stone Album Guide	1/5 stars

In a contemporary review, Xavier Russel of the British magazine Kerrang! called the pompous sound of Kansas "very dated" and, despite a few pleasant rockers like "Musicatto", found other songs "embarrassing beyond belief". In his retrospective review, AllMusic reviewer Bret Adams remarked that Kansas took a dramatic change in musical viewpoints, becoming "more hard rock and pop than prog rock", which "probably surprised longtime Kansas fans" but gave the band "an interesting, if ultimately short-lived, new direction."

== Track listing ==
All tracks are written by Steve Morse and Steve Walsh except where noted.

Side one
No.	Title	Writer(s)	Length
1.	"Silhouettes in Disguise"		4:26
2.	"Power"	Randy Goodrum, Steve Morse, Steve Walsh	4:25
3.	"All I Wanted"		3:20
4.	"Secret Service"	John Booth Aclin, Ron Miller, Morse, Walsh	4:42
5.	"We're Not Alone Anymore"		4:16

Side two
No.	Title	Writer(s)	Length
6.	"Musicatto" (instrumental)		3:30
7.	"Taking In the View"		3:06
8.	"Three Pretenders"	Billy Greer, Morse, Walsh	3:50
9.	"Tomb 19"		3:46
10.	"Can't Cry Anymore" (The Producers cover)	Tim Smith, Van Temple	4:01

== Personnel ==
- Steve Walsh – lead vocals, keyboards
- Steve Morse – guitar, backing vocals
- Billy Greer – bass, guitar, backing vocals
- Rich Williams – guitar, backing vocals
- Phil Ehart – drums, percussions

== Charts ==
Chart (1987)	Peak position
Canada Top Albums/CDs (RPM)	92
US Billboard 200	35
