= Freaks of Nature (Kansas album) =

Studio album by Kansas
- Released: May 29, 1995
- Recorded: 1995
- Studio: Caribbean Sound Basin, Trinidad, West Indies
- Genre: Art rock, hard rock
- Length: 45:14
- Label: Intersound (US); Essential/Castle Communications (Europe); Sony Music (Japan)
- Producer: Jeff Glixman

Kansas chronology
The Kansas Boxed Set (1994)	Freaks of Nature (1995)	Always Never the Same (1998)

Professional ratings
Review scores
Source	Rating
AllMusic	2/5 stars
The Encyclopedia of Popular Music	2/5 stars
Entertainment Weekly	B−
(The New) Rolling Stone Album Guide	1/5 stars

Freaks of Nature is the twelfth studio album by the American rock band Kansas, released in 1995. Two edited singles were issued but did not chart, nor did the album itself, making it the only Kansas studio album not to appear on any Billboard chart. The band promoted the album by touring with the Alan Parsons Project, and then opening for Styx.

== Production ==
Recorded in Trinidad, the album was produced by Jeff Glixman. Violinist David Ragsdale cowrote four of Freaks of Nature's songs. The band chose to forgo the overproduction of previous albums, including eschewing orchestral instrumentation.

== Critical reception ==
Entertainment Weekly wrote that "the techno synths and hoedown fiddles of 'Need' and the AOR schmaltz and African drums on 'I Can Fly' are fairly innovative syntheses." The Washington Post determined that the band "continues to sound like a middle-American knockoff of such British predecessors as Yes."

The Deseret News noted that "the world-rhythm-inspired 'Need' adds a new angle to Kansas' Midwest progression while the album's title cut is pure, blues-based rock-a-rolla." USA Today concluded: "If you insist on listening to overblown art-rock, the band's new Freaks of Nature album isn't any worse than 'Carry On Wayward Son'."

== Track listing ==
No.	Title	Writer(s)	Length
1.	"I Can Fly"	David Ragsdale, Steve Walsh	5:21
2.	"Desperate Times"	Walsh	5:25
3.	"Hope Once Again"	Walsh	4:34
4.	"Black Fathom 4"	Walsh, Ragsdale	5:54
5.	"Under the Knife"	Walsh, Ragsdale	4:54
6.	"Need"	Walsh	3:59
7.	"Freaks of Nature"	Ragsdale, Walsh, Phil Ehart	4:05
8.	"Cold Grey Morning"	Kerry Livgren	4:14
9.	"Peaceful and Warm"	Walsh	6:44

== Personnel ==
- Phil Ehart - drums, percussion
- Rich Williams - guitar, backing vocals
- Steve Walsh - lead vocals, keyboards
- Billy Greer - bass, guitar, backing vocals
- Greg Robert - keyboards, backing vocals
- David Ragsdale - violin, backing vocals
