= Jeff Glixman =

American record producer

Jeff Glixman is an American record producer. He has produced, mixed or remastered artists such as Kansas, Magnum, Gary Moore, Yngwie Malmsteen, The Georgia Satellites, Black Sabbath and Ludacris. Combined sales of his projects exceed 30 million units.

== Career ==
His first production was the 1975 Kansas album Song for America and he went on to produce their albums Masque (1975), Leftoverture (1976) and Point of Know Return (1977). He wrote additional lyrics on Black Sabbath's Seventh Star (1986). In addition, Glixman has worked as a mixer on 5.1 surround sound projects for the Allman Brothers' Eat a Peach and At Fillmore East, Ludacris' Chicken-n-Beer, Marvin Gaye's Let's Get It On and Bob Marley & The Wailers' Live at Leeds, the second disc in the reissue of Burnin'.

Glixman is the Executive Vice President of StarCity Recording Company in Bethlehem, Pennsylvania, and is involved in the ownership and management of professional studios including Axis Sound Studios in Atlanta, Georgia, Caribbean Sound Basin in Trinidad and Lobo Recording Studios in Deer Park, New York.

== Discography ==
The following is an incomplete list of the records worked on by Glixman since 1974.

Title	Year	Artist	Credited role
Song for America	1975	Kansas	Producer
Masque	1975	Kansas	Producer
Leftoverture	1976	Kansas	Producer
Point of Know Return	1977	Kansas	Producer
Paul Stanley	1978	Kiss	Producer, engineer
Corridors of Power	1982	Gary Moore	Producer
Chase the Dragon	1982	Magnum	Producer
Second Opinion	1982	4 Out of 5 Doctors	Producer
Victims of the Future	1983	Gary Moore	Producer
On My Own Two Feet	1983	Paul Barrere	Producer
Power & the Glory	1983	Saxon	Producer
Georgia Satellites	1986	The Georgia Satellites	Producer
Seventh Star	1986	Black Sabbath	Producer
The Eternal Idol	1987	Black Sabbath	Producer
Mirador	1987	Magnum	Producer
Odyssey	1988	Yngwie Malmsteen	Producer
Saraya	1989	Saraya	Producer
Foundation	1990	Magnum	Producer
Electric Light Orchestra Part Two	1991	ELO Part II	Producer
Live at the Whisky	1992	Kansas	Producer, mixer
Freaks of Nature	1995	Kansas	Producer
The Sabbath Stones	1996	Black Sabbath	Producer
Worlds Away	1996	John Norum	Producer
Always Never the Same	1998	Kansas	Mixer
Road to Paradise: Anthology 1978–83		Magnum	Producer
Double LIVE!	1998	Yngwie Malmsteen	Engineer
Best of Yngwie Malmsteen Live	1998	Yngwie Malmsteen	Mixing
Maximum 80's	1998	Various Artists	Producer
Best of Kansas (1999)	1999	Kansas	Remastering
Out in the Fields: The Very Best of Gary Moore	1998	Gary Moore	Producer
Rock: Train Kept a Rollin'	1999	Various Artists	Producer
Under a Violet Moon	1999	Blackmore's Night	Engineer, Keyboards
Double Live	2000	Yngwie Malmsteen	Mixing
Who Are We Living For?	2000	Dispatch	Mixing Engineer
Archives	2001	Yngwie Malmsteen	Mixing
Pleasure to Burn	2001	Burning Rain	Mixing
Leftoverture (Bonus Tracks)	2001	Kansas	Assistant Engineer
Madhouse: The Very Best of Anthrax	2001	Anthrax	Mastering
Masque (Bonus Tracks)	2001	Kansas	Producer
Universal Motown All-Stars: Holiday Revue It	2002	Various Artists	Producer
20th Century Masters - The Millennium Collection: The Best of Head East	2001	Head East	Producer
Like, Omigod! The '80s Pop Culture Box (Totally)	2002	Various Artists	Producer
Long Days, Black Nights (Compilation)	2002	Magnum	Producer
Point of Know Return (Remastered)	2002	Kansas	Engineer
Blind Date (Windsong)	2002	Blind Date	Producer
Ultimate Kansas	2002	Kansas	Producer
Let's Get It On (Remastered) (Bonus Tracks)	2003	Marvin Gaye	Mixing
Device Voice Drum	2002	Kansas	Mixing
Instrumental Best	2004	Yngwie Malmsteen	Engineer/Mixing
Mullets Rock	2003	Various Artists	Producer
Doc Rock: Campfire Class (Can)	2004	Various Artists	Producer
Instrumental Best Album	2004	Yngwie Malmsteen	Mixing
Burnin (Remastered) (Dlx) (Exp) (Dig)	2004	Bob Marley & the Wailers	Mixing
Sail On: The 30th Anniversary Collection 1974-2004	2004	Kansas	Compilation Producer
20th Century Masters: Millennium Collection (Remastered)	2005	Yngwie Malmsteen	Producer
Chase the Dragon (Bonus Tracks #2)	2005	Magnum	Engineer
Live (Eng) (Remastered) (Dig)	2005	Yngwie Malmsteen	Mixing
Room V	2005	Shadow Gallery	Mastering
Corridors Of Power (Bonus Tracks) (Eng)	2005	Gary Moore	Producer
Upstairs	2005	Orange Sky	Mixing
Works in Progress	2006	Kansas	Mastering
Gold: Southern Rock (Remastered)	2005	Various Artists	Producer
Gold: '80s Metal	2007	Various Artists	Producer
Ace Gene Peter & Paul (Box)	2006	Kiss	Engineer
Masters of Rock	2007	Saxon	Producer
Mullets Rock! Too!	2007	Various Artists	Producer
Reconstruction	2007	4 Out of 5 Doctors	Producer
Song For America (Bonus Track) (Remastered) (Exp)		Kansas	Reissue Producer
This Time Around (compilation)	2007	Glenn Hughes	Engineer
Kansas (Bonus Tracks) (Remastered)	2008	Kansas	Reissue Producer
Outlaw Country	2008	Various Artists	Producer
I Forgot What You Taught Me	2008	Sam Barsh	Producer
Reconstruction	2008	Four Out Of Five Doctors	Producer
Essential 3.0	2008	Kansas	Compilation Producer
Kansas Two for the Show (30th Anniversary Edition)	2008	Kansas	Producer/Mastering/Mixing
Out the Mud	2020	Chapel Hart	Producer
