= Drastic Measures =

Studio album by Kansas
- Released: July 1983
- Recorded: Early 1983
- Studios: Lakewood Fairgrounds, Atlanta, Georgia with Le Mobile Recording Facility, Bullet Recording, Nashville, Tennessee
- Genres: Pop rock; hard rock; Christian rock
- Length: 42:00
- Labels: CBS Associated/Kirshner, Epic
- Producers: Kansas and Neil Kernon

Kansas chronology
Vinyl Confessions (1982)	Drastic Measures (1983)	The Best of Kansas (1984)

Singles from Drastic Measures
- 1. "Fight Fire with Fire" Released: August 1983; 2. "Everybody's My Friend" Released: November 1983

Professional ratings
Review scores
Source	Rating
AllMusic	2/5 stars
Melodic.net	5/5 stars
The Rolling Stone Album Guide	1/5 stars

Drastic Measures is the ninth studio album by American rock band Kansas, released in 1983.

The shift in direction that Kansas took with Vinyl Confessions took its toll before recording began on this album. After hearing that Christian fans of Kansas were using lyrics from Vinyl Confessions in religious tracts and handing them out prior to the band's live appearances, violinist Robby Steinhardt grew tired of Kansas's new Christian affiliation and quit the band at the end of the 1982 tour.

Despite the success of Vinyl Confessions, both among mainstream and Christian audiences, the album was criticized in some quarters — especially by Rolling Stone — for being too repetitive of Kansas' prior efforts. Drastic Measures was new lead singer John Elefante's attempt to change that perception, and his compositions dominate the album, with Kansas co-founder Kerry Livgren only contributing three tracks. Because the sound of Drastic Measures is more akin to the successful records that Loverboy and Foreigner were putting out at the time, Livgren was greatly displeased. This is bluntly expressed in his lyrics for "Mainstream", which are as much a criticism of the band's new direction as they are a slam at the music industry in general.

With the exception of the last three songs on the record, any Christian lyrical content was mostly indirect and oblique, although this was primarily due to Livgren holding back a number of songs for his future projects. Combined with a strange choice for an album cover, the new Kansas presented on Drastic Measures confused long-time fans and disappointed Christian listeners. The album was the band's lowest-charting record since their debut in 1974 and the tensions within the band eventually became too much. Kansas officially disbanded after giving a New Year's Eve concert at the end of their 1983 tour, although Ehart, Williams, and Elefante stayed to record the song "Perfect Lover" for The Best of Kansas compilation album.

Livgren and Dave Hope left the band to found AD, while Elefante went on to become a successful producer of contemporary Christian music bands like Petra as well as a popular CCM performer in his own right; as of 2021 he has never performed with Kansas again.

One of the first rock videos (along with "Beat It" and "New Frontier") to be shot on 35-mm film and exhibited in movie theaters as a trailer, the music video for "Fight Fire with Fire", directed by Dominic Orlando, was released theatrically across the U.S. in 1983 as a short subject with Francis Ford Coppola's Rumble Fish. The song reached No. 3 on the Billboard Mainstream Rock Chart and No. 58 on the Hot 100. The song also appeared on Kansas: Small Anthology and on every version of The Awesome Kansas Mix.

The album was re-released on CD in remastered form in February 1996 on Legacy/Epic Records, then again in 2011 on Rock Candy Records.

== Track listing ==
All tracks are written by John Elefante and Dino Elefante except where noted.

Side one
No.	Title	Writer(s)	Length
1.	"Fight Fire with Fire"		3:40
2.	"Everybody's My Friend"		4:09
3.	"Mainstream"	Kerry Livgren	6:36
4.	"Andi"	J. Elefante	4:15

Side two
No.	Title	Writer(s)	Length
1.	"Going Through the Motions"		5:43
2.	"Get Rich"		3:43
3.	"Don't Take Your Love Away"		3:44
4.	"End of the Age"	Livgren	4:33
5.	"Incident on a Bridge"	Livgren	5:37

== Personnel ==
Kansas

- John Elefante – keyboards, lead vocals
- Kerry Livgren – guitar, keyboards, Synclavier II programming
- Rich Williams – guitar
- Dave Hope – bass guitar
- Phil Ehart – drums

Additional musicians

- Jim Vest – steel guitar on tracks 4 and 7
- David Pack, Terry Brock, Kyle Henderson – background vocals

Production

- Neil Kernon – producer, engineer, mixing at Bullet Recording, Nashville, Tennessee
- Cliff Bonnell, Guy Charbonneau – Le Mobile engineers
- Danny Mundhenk – Bullet Recording engineer
- Howie Weinberg – mastering at Masterdisk, New York
- Drennon Studio – art direction
- Glen Wexler – photography

== Charts ==
Chart (1983)	Peak position
US Billboard 200	41
