= Dennis Holt (drummer) =

- Born: June 3, 1958 (age 68); Honolulu, HI, U.S.
- Origin: Nashville, TN, U.S.
- Genres: Christian, gospel, rock, Christian rock, country, pop
- Occupation: Musician
- Instruments: Drums, percussion
- Years active: 1970–present
- Formerly of: AD

Dennis Holt (born June 3, 1958) is an American drummer, percussionist, and singer. He was the drummer for the Christian rock band AD. In addition to his work with AD, he has also played drums as a touring drummer and session drummer since the 1970s. Artists he has collaborated with include Kansas, Kerry Livgren, Joe Nichols, Taylor Swift, Lee Brice, and Chase Rice.

== Early life ==
Holt was born on June 3, 1958, in Honolulu, Hawaii. He first started playing the drum set at age nine. Throughout middle school and high school, he played drums and percussion in the school marching band and orchestra.

== Career ==
Holt's first paid performances as a drummer came at age 12 in 1970. He played more gigs and joined various pop and rock bands as he built his career. Meanwhile, he moved to Florida, California, and Colorado before settling in Nashville, Tennessee, where he has worked as a session drummer since the late 1970s.

By 1983, Holt became good friends with Kansas's lead guitarist and songwriter Kerry Livgren and occasionally filled in for their drummer, Phil Ehart, from 1983 to 1985. Impressed by Holt's drumming and Christian faith, Livgren hired Holt for his Christian rock band, AD. Holt played drums and percussion and sang vocals on the albums Time Line, Art of the State, Reconstructions, AD Live, Decade, and Reconstructions: Reconstructed, and toured across the United States with AD in 1984 and 1985. Livgren and Holt remain friends today.

After AD's split, Holt returned to Nashville and continued playing drums for rock, pop, Christian, gospel, Christian rock, country, jazz, and R&B artists, on tour and in the studio. Artists he has recorded and performed with include country singers Emmylou Harris, Loretta Lynn, Hank Williams, Jr., Ricky Skaggs, Marie Osmond, B. J. Thomas, K. T. Oslin, Pam Tillis, Restless Heart, Lorrie Morgan, Trisha Yearwood, Joe Nichols, Mindy McCready, Lee Ann Womack, Buddy Miller, Trent Tomlinson, Taylor Swift, Lee Brice, and Chase Rice, Christian artists Whiteheart, Holy Soldier, Larry Norman, Phil Keaggy, Kerry Livgren, Richie Furay, Sixpence None the Richer, and Jeremy Camp, rock artists Kansas, T-Bone Burnett, Danny Seraphine, Kim Carnes, and Sam Phillips, and R&B artists Dobie Gray, The Pointer Sisters, Sheila E., and Deniece Williams.

He has also recorded drums and percussion for radio and TV jingles for McDonald's, Pepsi, Air National Guard, 7-Eleven, IBM, Miller Brewing Company, Discover Card, Diet Coke, and Mazda.

Holt currently works as a regular studio drummer for audio engineer John McBride at Blackbird Studio and as a freelance session drummer on the music website SoundBetter.

== Gear ==
Holt endorses DW drums, Paiste cymbals, Innovative Percussion drumsticks and mallets, and Remo drumheads.

== Personal life ==
Holt is a Christian. He has often played the drums on mission trips around the world.

He is a fan of the Florida Gators and the Los Angeles Dodgers.

== Discography ==
with Kerry Livgren & AD

- Time Line (1984)
- Art of the State (1985)
- Reconstructions (1987)
- Compact Favorites (1988)
- Decade (1992)
- Reconstructions: Reconstructed (1997)
- AD Live (1998)

As a session/touring drummer and percussionist

- The Archers – Fresh Surrender (1977)
- Mickey & Becki – Brand New (1979)
- Scott Wesley Brown – Signature (1982)
- Whiteheart – Whiteheart (1982)
- Gordon Jensen – Fighting the Fight (1984)
- Billy Crockett – Carrier (1984)
- Pam Mark Hall – Supply and Demand (1984)
- Whiteheart – Vital Signs (1984)
- Brent Lamb – Tug of War (1984)
- Chris Christian – Let the Music Start (1984)
- The Imperials – The Imperials Sing the Classics (1984)
- Restless Heart – Restless Heart (1985)
- The Hemphills – Excited! (1985)
- Twenty Twenty – Twenty Twenty (1985)
- Wayne Watson – Giants in the Land (1985)
- David Martin – Stronger Than the Weight (1985)
- Tim Daniel – A Vision Beyond (1985)
- Silverwind – Set Apart (1986)
- Cruse – Long Journey Home (1986)
- Carman – A Long Time Ago...in a Land Called Bethlehem (1986)
- 2nd Chapter of Acts – Hymns (1986)
- Tony Elenburg – First Things First (1986)
- The Pointer Sisters – Hot Together (1986)
- Wayne Watson – Watercolor Ponies (1987)
- Whiteheart – Greatest Hits (1987)
- Laury Boone Browning – Thursday's Child (1987)
- Shout – It Won't Be Long (1988)
- Steve Taylor – The Best We Could Find (1988)
- Carman – Live: Radically Saved (1988)
- Don Francisco – High Praise (1988)
- The Maranatha! Singers – Hallelujah: 16 Songs of Joyful Boasting (1988)
- Terry Blackwood – Keep Pressing On (1989)
- Whiteheart – Collector's Disc (1989)
- Deniece Williams – Special Love (1989)
- The Maranatha! Singers – Hosanna: 15 Songs of Freedom (1989)
- Phil and John – Don't Look Now...It's The Hallelujah Brothers (1989)
- Word Records – Our Hymns (1989)
- Richard Souther – Cross Currents (1989)
- Narada Productions – The Narada Collection, Vol. 2 (1989)
- Angie Alan – Angie Alan (1990)
- The Maranatha! Singers – We Shall Stand: The Spiritual Warfare Series, Vol. 2 (1990)
- Bluestone Band – Praise in the Streets (1991)
- Tom Stipe – Never Too Late (1991)
- 2nd Chapter of Acts – Hymns II (1991)
- Danny Daniels – Hearts on Fire (1991)
- Don Francisco – Vision of the Valley (1991)
- Julie Meyer – Tomorrow's Calling (1992)
- Shout – At the Top of Their Lungs (1992)
- Ernie Rettino – Psalty's Funtastic Praise Party! (1993)
- Terri Lynn – Inside a Tear (1993)
- Whiteheart – Vital Signs Gold Series (1994)
- Danny Daniels – Praise Collection (1994)
- Jon Chandler – Out West of Laramie (1994)
- Maree McRae – I Won't Settle for Less (1995)
- Geoff Moore – Familiar Stranger: The Early Works of Geoff Moore (1995)
- Wayne Watson – The Very Best (1995)
- Phil Keaggy – Time 1 (1995)
- Phil Keaggy – Time 2 (1995)
- Holy Soldier – Promise Man (1995)
- Will Colliver – Fading to Grey (1996)
- Romantic Interludes – Acapulco Moon (1996)
- Brad Lee – Outside Lookin' In (1996)
- Jon Chandler – Keepers of the Flame (1996)
- Joe Nichols – Joe Nichols (1996)
- Kate Campbell – Moonpie Dreams (1997)
- Richie Furay – In My Father's House (1997)
- Jamie Owens-Collins – Seasons (1997)
- Linda Storey – Willow Tree (1998)
- Mitch McVicker – Mitch McVicker (1998)
- Calvary Chapel Music – Praise Vol. 1: Give Thanks To The Lord (1998)
- Calvary Chapel Music – Praise Vol. 2: Until You Return (1998)
- Calvary Chapel Music – Praise Vol. 3: There Is A River (1998)
- Calvary Chapel Music – Praise Vol. 4: We Remember (1999)
- Calvary Chapel Music – Praise Vol. 5: When I Walk With You (1999)
- Calvary Chapel Music – Worship Alive, Vol. 2 (1999)
- Calvary Chapel Music – In God We Trust, Vol. 3 (1999)
- Crossroads Worship – Sing to the Living God, Vol. 2 (1999)
- Maranatha! Praise Band – Praise 20: Who Is Like the Lord (1999)
- Brenda Harp – The Road Home (1999)
- Jon Chandler – Westerns (1999)
- Ener-Jazz – Acoustic Energy (1999)
- Women of Faith – Extravagant Grace (2000)
- Sheila Walsh – Blue Waters (2000)
- Mitch McVicker – Chasing the Horizon (2000)
- Stan Sinclair – Just One Man (2000)
- Danny Daniels – Northern Light (2000)
- Terry Scott Taylor – Avocado Faultline (2000)
- Various Artists – Eterne: Never Be the Same (2000)
- Various Artists – All Who Trust in the Lord (2000)
- City on a Hill – City on a Hill: Songs of Worship and Praise (2000)
- Phil Keaggy – Zion (2000)
- Melissa Tawlks – Mystery Revealed (2000)
- Rebecca St. James – Transform (2000)
- Nadia – Nadia (2001)
- Peter Dawson Band – Do You Don't or Do You Do? (2001)
- Paul Baloche – God of Wonders (2001)
- Various Artists – Your Love Broke Through: The Worship Songs of Keith Green (2002)
- City on a Hill – City on a Hill: Sing Alleluia (2002)
- City on a Hill – Our God of Wonders, Vol. 1: A Gathering of Your Favorite Artists and Worship Songs (2002)
- Vineyard Music – The Call (2002)
- Owen Temple – Right Here and Now (2002)
- Various Artists – Making God Smile: An Artists' Tribute to the Songs of Beach Boy Brian Wilson (2002)
- Joe Nichols – Six of One, Half a Dozen of the Other (2002)
- Jon Chandler – Sepia Soul: The Best of Jon Chandler (2002)
- City on a Hill – City on a Hill: It's Christmas Time (2002)
- Russell Smith – The End Is Not in Sight (2002)
- Various Artists – A Life God Rewards (2002)
- GlassByrd – Open Wide This Window (2003)
- The Hoskins Family – Places to Go, People to See (2003)
- Brooks Williams – Nectar (2003)
- Restless Heart – RCA Country Legends (2003)
- Rebecca St. James – Wait for Me: The Best from Rebecca St. James (2003)
- Lost Dogs – Nazarene Crying Towel (2003)
- Jake Armerding – Jake Armerding (2003)
- Greg Trooper – Floating (2003)
- Christ Tabernacle Choir – Inhabit the Praise (2003)
- Jill Paquette – Jill Paquette (2003)
- Myrrh – Bridge (2003)
- City on a Hill – City on a Hill: The Gathering (2003)
- R.J. Helton – Real Life (2004)
- Promise Keepers – Uprising: A Revolution of the Soul (2004)
- James Clay – James Clay (2004)
- Charity Von – Charity Von (2004)
- City on a Hill – City on a Hill: The Collection (2004)
- Legacy Five – Monuments (2004)
- The Drunk Cowboys – Honky Tonkin' the Beatles (2004)
- Lisa Layne – All I Want for Christmas is You (2004)
- Kristina – Hymns: The Old Made New (2005)
- Richie Furay – I Am Sure (2005)
- Michelle Tumes, Susan Ashton, and Christine Dente – Lost in Wonder: Voices of Worship (2005)
- Various Artists – Worship Hymns, Vol. 1: The Old Made New (2005)
- Scott Wesley Brown – The Old Hymns Made New (2005)
- Various Artists – Come Let Us Adore Him: A Christmas Worship Experience (2005)
- Joe Nichols – The Early Years (2005)
- Joan Enguita – Two Suitcases (2005)
- Trent Tomlinson – Country Is My Rock (2006)
- Jadon Lavik – Life on the Inside (2006)
- Various Artists – Worship Hymns 3-Disc Set: The Old Made New (2006)
- Allen Brown – Foolin' Myself (2006)
- Various Artists – Life is Precious: A Wes King Tribute (2006)
- Taylor Swift – Taylor Swift (2006)
- Richie Furay – The Heartbeat of Love (2006)
- Jeremy Camp – Beyond Measure (2006)
- Andy Bromley – One Way (2007)
- The Hanshaws – The Hanshaws (2007)
- Jason Harrod – Bright as You (2007)
- Deon Taylor – Light After Dark (2007)
- Heather Rigdon – Young & Naïve (2007)
- Heather Wiggins – Heather Wiggins (2007)
- Twila Paris – Small Sacrifice (2007)
- Various Artists – Truckers' Tracks, Vol. 1: Saddle Up and Ride (2008)
- The Roys – Good Days (2008)
- The Robertson Brothers – Flight 1974 (2008)
- Taylor Swift – Beautiful Eyes (2008)
- Mike Aiken – Hula Girl Highway (2008)
- Mark Burchfield – Country Piano Christmas (2008)
- Randy Rigby and Ed Edwards – Uncorked: Sounds of the Wine Country (2008)
- Taylor Swift – Taylor Swift Karaoke (2009)
- Adele Morgan – This One Life (2009)
- Jason Rogers – Jason Rogers (2009)
- Sam L. Rainwater – Vacation Location (2009)
- Lee Brice – Love Like Crazy (2010)
- Chris McClarney – Defender (2010)
- Brent Burns – Cuban Sugar (2010)
- Various Artists – Modern Hymnal 2.0 (2010)
- Various Artists – Love Divine: The Hymns of Charles Wesley (2011)
- Various Artists – Worship Devotional: August (2011)
- Levi Riggs – There's Still a Place for That (2011)
- Various Artists – Act of Valor: The Album (2012)
- Chase Rice – Dirt Road Communion (2012)
- Don Moen – Uncharted Territory (2012)
- Various Artists – Mercyland: Hymns for the Rest of Us (2012)
- Lee Brice – Hard 2 Love (2012)
- Brent Burns – Baby Boomers (2012)
- Buffy Lawson – I'm Leaving You for Me (2012)
- Various Artists – Let Us in Americana: The Music of Paul McCartney (2013)
- Richie Furay – Hand In Hand (2015)
- The Long and Short of It – You Made Me Stronger (2015)
- K. T. Oslin - Simply (2015)
- 8 Ball Aitken – 8 Ball Aitken (2016)
- Forlorn Strangers – Forlorn Strangers (2016)
- Various Artists – Treasure of the Broken Land: The Songs of Mark Heard (2017)
- ESOEBO – IV (2017)
- Peter Rogan – Still Tryin' to Believe (2019)
- Matt Backer – Backernalia (2021)
- Various Artists – Classic Yuletide Anthems (2024)
- Johanna Marianna – "Jealousy" (2024)
- Various Artists – Rockin' Christmas Songs (2024)
