= Mylon LeFevre discography =

Discography of the Gospel Music Hall of Fame inductee Mylon LeFevre

This is a discography for the Gospel Music Hall of Fame inductee Mylon LeFevre.

== Albums ==
Year	Album	Peak Chart Position	Label	Producer
1964	New Found Joy		Skylite Records	
1968	Your Only Tomorrow		Sing Records	
1970	Mylon (We Believe)		Cotillion Records	Allen Toussaint
1971	Holy Smoke		Columbia	Felix Pappalardi
1972	Over the Influence		Columbia	Allen Toussaint
1973	On the Road to Freedom (with Alvin Lee)	138	Columbia	Alvin Lee
1977	Weak at the Knees	30	Warner Bros.	Jerry Crutchfield
1978	Love Rustler		Warner Bros.	Jerry Crutchfield
1980	Rock & Roll Resurrection	33	Mercury	Allen Toussaint
1993	Faith, Hope & Love	28	Star Song	Scott Allen, Mylon Lefevre
2003	Bow Down		Angel Band Music	

=== Mylon and Broken Heart ===
Year	Album	US Christian	Record label
1982	Brand New Start		MCA Songbird
1983	More	15	Myrrh
1983	Live Forever		Myrrh
1985	Sheep In Wolves Clothing	17	Myrrh
1986	Look Up	26	CBS Associated
1987	Crack the Sky	5	Myrrh
1988	Face the Music	3	Star Song
1989	Big World	10	Star Song
1990	Crank It Up	4	Star Song

=== Compilations ===
- 1988: Mylon and Broken Heart, Greatest Hits (Myrrh)
- 1992: A Decade of Love (Star Song)
- 2007: The Definitive Collection (Word)

== Charting singles ==
Year	Single	CCM peak chart positions				Album
Year	Single	Inspo	AC	CHR	Rock	Album
1983	"My Heart Belongs to Him"	10	10	10	—	More
1983	"Free Man"	—	—	—	4	More
1985	"The Warrior"	4	4	2	—	Sheep in Wolves' Clothing
1985	"He Is Strong"	29	29	4	—	Sheep in Wolves' Clothing
1985	"Gospel Ship"	—	—	—	12	Sheep in Wolves' Clothing
1986	"Trains Up in the Sky"	—	—	5	4	Sheep in Wolves' Clothing
1986	"Morning Star"	13	13	—	—	Sheep in Wolves' Clothing
1987	"For My Growing"	—	9	–	–	Crack the Sky
1987	"Crack the Sky"	—	—	1	1	Crack the Sky
1987	"Love God, Hate Sin"	—	—	–	1	Crack the Sky
1987	"Closer Than a Heartbeat"	—	—	6	–	Crack the Sky
1988	"Let Me Be the One"	–	–	11	12	Crack the Sky
1988	"Again and Again"	—	1	–	–	Face the Music
1988	"Won by One"	—	—	2	1	Face the Music
1988	"Sixteen"	—	—	12	3	Face the Music
1988	"Mercy Seat"	8	3	14	—	Face the Music
1988	"Change"	–	—	—	16	Face the Music
1988	"Modern Man"	37	7	—	–	Face the Music
1989	"Talk to Me"	—	—	–	9	Face the Music
1989	"Lamb of God"	13	–	—	—	Face the Music
1989	"Jesus, It's You"	10	1	5	—	Big World
1989	"Big World"	–	—	–	6	Big World
1989	"Turn the Tables on Me"	–	—	–	9	Big World
1989	"Movin' On"	16	12	–	–	Big World
1989	"Love Comes Down"	–	22	1	–	Big World
1990	"Give It Away"	8	3	8	–	Crank It Up
1990	"Denomination Demolition"	–	–	–	4	Crank It Up
1990	"Shower the People"	–	4	4	–	Crank It Up
1990	"Crank It Up"	–	–	–	8	Crank It Up
1991	"Letter from the Front"	–	19	3	–	Crank It Up
1991	"Heaven"	–	–	–	5	Crank It Up
1991	"Going Home"	–	25	–	–	Crank It Up
1991	"World Changer"	–	–	–	19	Crank It Up
1991	"Secret Place"	–	2	13	–	A Decade of Love
1992	"Invincible Love"	3	1	–	–	Faith, Hope & Love
1993	"Closer Than a Friend"	10	1	–	–	Faith, Hope & Love
1993	"Give Thanks"	2	6	–	–	Faith, Hope & Love
1993	"Faithful"	12	–	–	–	Faith, Hope & Love
1993	"Holy Is the Lord"	7	–	–	–	Faith, Hope & Love
"—" denotes singles that did not chart.

== As a member of The LeFevres ==
- 1960: The LeFevres In Stereo (Sing Records)
- 1965: Sing the Gospel (Sing)
- 1965: Songs of Happiness (Sing)
- 1965: You Need the Lord (Sing)
- 1966: Without Him (Sing)
- 1970: The LeFevres Present Pierce and Mylon Lefevre (Canaan) compilation from earlier recordings

== As a member of The Stamps Quartet ==
- 1967: Music Music Music (Skylite)
- 1968: J.D. Sumner & the Colorful Stamps (Skylite)

== Appearances on other albums ==
- 1974: Third Annual Pipe Dream – Atlanta Rhythm Section (Polydor)
- 1975: Sammy Johns – Sammy Johns (GRC)
- 1975: Tommy (soundtrack) – (chorus) (Polydor)
- 1976: Volunteer Jam – The Charlie Daniels Band
- 1980: Seeds of Change – Kerry Livgren (Kirshner)
- 1984: Super Jammin' – Earl Scruggs Revue (Columbia)
- 1990: Love Broke Thru – Phil Keaggy (New Song)
- 1990: Our Christmas – various artists "O Holy Night" (Word)
- 1992: A Few Good Men – Gaither Vocal Band (title song) (Star Song)
- 1994: I Was On His Mind – Kenneth Copeland "Without Him" (KCP)
- 1996: Shelter – Gary Chapman "Gospel Ship" (Reunion)
- 1998: In His Presence – Phil Driscoll (Most High Music)
- 1998: Step Up to the Microphone – Newsboys (Star Song)
- 2014: Sun and Shield – Peter Furler Band (New Day/Platinum Pop)

== Video ==
- 1985: The CAUSE — "Do Something Now" (Myrrh)
- 1985: Mylon LeFevre and Broken Heart: 4 Concept Videos/Interview (Myrrh)
- 1988: Mylon Lefevre and Broken Heart: Sheep In Wolves Clothing Live (Myrrh)
- 1992: Mylon and Broken Heart — Crank It Up (Star Song)

=== Gaither Homecoming Video performances ===
- 1996: Ryman Gospel Reunion — "Without Him"
- 2004: Turn Your Radio On
- 2009: Joy In My Heart — "Without Him"
