= Michael Gleason (musician) =

American musician, singer and songwriter

- Born: Michael Gleason; Kansas, United States
- Origin: Wichita, Kansas
- Genres: Progressive rock, Christian rock, acoustic, instrumental music
- Occupations: Songwriter, record producer; recording artist
- Instruments: Vocals; keyboards; guitar
- Years active: 1983–present

Michael Gleason is an American musician, singer and songwriter, best known as one of the founding members of the 1980s rock band AD.

== Biography ==
Gleason grew up around Wichita, Kansas. He was drawn to music at a young age. When he was in high school and early college he became increasingly interested in 1970s progressive rock music. In particular, he was an admirer of Kansas. He had performed in night clubs for years before he joined Kansas as a touring member. Despite being increasingly attracted by rock music, he did not choose a typical rock'n'roll lifestyle but he wanted to share a positive message, written from a Christian worldview. As Gleason stated in an interview in 1990, "I had the very good fortune of being raised in a home with two parents who were strong committed believers. So whether Jesus Christ was the truth or was real was never really a question. It was in my earliest upbringing. It was a natural part of me as a child. Of course, there came that moment of truth later on as an adolescent where I internalised that and made it my own. I'm committed to it, and have seen it borne out in the lives of people around me".

=== Early 1980s ===
Being an admirer of the music of Kansas and their main songwriter, Kerry Livgren, Gleason did some multi-track studio work that he sent to a post office box, which was on Livgren's first solo album, Seeds of Change from 1980. Several months later, Livgren called him back and asked him if he could join him on a new solo record. After vocalist Steve Walsh left Kansas in 1981, Gleason was among the hopefuls to become the new Kansas frontman, along with Warren Ham and others. Although John Elefante became new lead singer and keyboardist of Kansas, both Gleason and Ham left an impression on Livgren and were invited to join Kansas in the Drastic Measures tour in 1983 as touring members. Gleason played additional keyboards and added background vocals.

=== AD, 1983–1988 ===
In 1983, Livgren recorded his second solo release along with himself on guitar and keyboard, Michael Gleason on vocals, keyboards and guitar, Warren Ham on saxophone, flute, harmonica and vocals, Dave Hope on bass, and Dennis Holt on drums. While Livgren and Hope had still been members of Kansas officially during the recording process, both left the band after a final New Year's Eve performance on December 31, 1983, which was at least partly a result of their new-found Christian beliefs that they felt unable to share in a free creative way due to rising tension with other band members and with the record label, Kirshner Records. During sessions for the album, it became apparent that the musicians shared many interests, not the least of which was their Christian faith. After years of feeling isolated and artistically stifled in Kansas, Livgren found working with fellow Christians refreshing. By the end of the recording sessions, the session musicians had jelled, and Livgren decided to name the group AD. Finally, their first album, Time Line, was released in 1984 and credited to Kerry Livgren/AD. However, it received virtually no promotion from CBS Records, who probably saw the side project as a threat to the continued success of Kansas. Due to legal entanglements caused by his contractual obligations with Kansas, Livgren was unable to market AD in the mainstream secular market. After negotiating with the record label, he received a waiver to perform with AD in the Christian rock market. This would become a hindrance to commercial viability for the band.

AD released their second album Art of the State in 1985. AD toured extensively in 1984 and 1985, sometimes playing bars and clubs one night and then churches the next. In spite of favorable album reviews, the tour for Art of the State was not as successful as intended, resulting in Warren Ham's departure from the band in 1986.

After Ham's departure, Gleason handled all lead vocals alone on AD's third album Reconstructions, which was released in 1986. Because of financial difficulties and the inability to keep up with the lack of support, AD faded away after its release, though no official breakup was announced.

In 1988, Livgren released a collection of previously unreleased AD songs titled Prime Mover, which was credited once again to Kerry Livgren/AD. Livgren played most instruments, while lead vocals, saxophone and blues harp were performed by Warren Ham. Gleason wrote the song I'll Follow You for this album and performed background vocals on it. Sparrow Records also released an AD compilation including songs from Art of the State and Reconstructions in 1988 called Compact Favorites.

In 1992, Sparrow released a Kerry Livgren/AD two-CD collection called Decade that featured the whole Time Line (AD) and Seeds of Change (Kerry Livgren) albums as well as songs from Art of the State (AD), Reconstructions (AD), Prime Mover (Kerry Livgren/AD) and One of Several Possible Musiks (Kerry Livgren). In addition, two previously unreleased songs from the Time Line sessions in 1983 with Michael Gleason on vocals were included. These two songs as well as another previously unreleased track, All in Time, which was originally recorded in 1986 and written and sung by Gleason, were included in the reissue Reconstructions Reconstructed, released by Livgren's Numavox record company in 1997 and again - remastered and repackaged - in 2006. In 1997, Livgren rediscovered recordings of two AD performances from 1984 and 1985, remastered them and released them as AD Live in 1998.

=== Solo artist and producer ===
In 1986, while he was still in AD, Michael Gleason recorded his first solo effort, called Voices from the Old World, an instrumental orchestral album. This album was later reissued on cd in 1998 by Numavox Records.

In 1987, he formed Pressure Point Productions in Atlanta, Georgia. He then began song writing, session and production work for other artists, including Steven Curtis Chapman, Wes King, Newsboys, Michael Card, Steve Green, Geoff Moore & The Distance, and many others. He also released instrumental songs for various compilations, including Lifetimes for the 1987 album Jazz Flavors Cats IV.

Gleason released his first rock solo album, Children of Choices, in 1990 through Pakaderm Records. The album featured an album-oriented rock sound, influenced by modern pop elements and was produced by himself as well as John and Dino Elefante. It enjoyed critical success, with two singles garnering top-five CCM chart positions.

Gleason wrote the CCM-chart-topping Say the Word for Truth's 1998 album Never Be the Same, and the #1 CCM hit The Stranger performed by Aaron Jeoffrey.

In 2001, he released his third solo project called Every Road, moving into a more mature rock/acoustic/singer-songwriter style.

In 2005, his fourth solo album, Cornerstone, came out, which is in style similar to Every Road but with a stronger contemporary praise & worship direction.

In addition, he wrote and performed songs for the Why Don't You: Songs That Teach Character (2002) and Why Don't You: Songs That Build Character (2005) children's music compilations as well as the song Throw Me a Line for the Letters to God Soundtrack (2010).

== Discography ==
=== with AD ===
- 1984 Time Line (CBS / Sparrow Records)
- 1985 Art of the State (Sparrow Records)
- 1986 Reconstructions (Sparrow Records)
- 1988 Prime Mover (only as guest musician on I'll Follow You) (Sparrow Records)

Live and compilations

- 1998 AD Live (recorded in 1984 and 1985, CD-R, Numavox Records)
- 1988 Compact Favorites (Sparrow Records)
- 1992 Decade (double-cd set featuring songs from all four AD studio albums as well as from Kerry Livgren's solo records Seeds of Change and One of Several Possible Musiks) (Sparrow Records)
- 2002 The Best of Kerry Livgren (features 2 AD songs with Michael Gleason on lead vocals, with Exiles being a completely re-recorded version) (Numavox Records)

Reissues

- 1997 Reconstructions Reconstructed, reissue of Reconstructions, partly re-recorded (remastered, repackaged in 2006 as CD-R) (Numavox Records)
- 1998 Art of the State, remastered reissue (reissued again in 2013) (CD-R, Numavox Records)
- 2007 Decade Vol. II, reissue of Time Line (previously reissued on Decade disc 2), remastered and partly re-recorded (CD-R, Numavox Records)

=== Solo records ===
- 1986 Voices from the Old World (Kerygma Records; reissue in 1998 by Numavox Records)
- 1990 Children of Choices (Pakaderm Records)
- 2001 Every Road (Pressure Point Productions)
- 2005 Cornerstone (Pressure Point Productions)

== See also ==
- AD
- Kansas
