= AD (band) =

American Christian rock band

- Also known as: Kerry Livgren/AD
- Genres: Christian rock
- Years active: 1983–1988
- Labels: Sparrow, CBS Associated, Kerygma, Numavox
- Past members: Kerry Livgren; Dave Hope; Michael Gleason; Dennis Holt; Warren Ham

AD was a 1980s Christian rock band, featuring former Kansas members Kerry Livgren (guitar, keyboard, synthesizers, backing vocals) and Dave Hope (bass), former Bloodrock member Warren Ham (lead vocals, saxophone, flute, harmonica), who had toured as a sideman with Kansas in 1982, Michael Gleason (lead vocals, keyboards, guitar), who had replaced Ham as a touring member of Kansas in 1983, and Dennis Holt (drums).

== Background ==
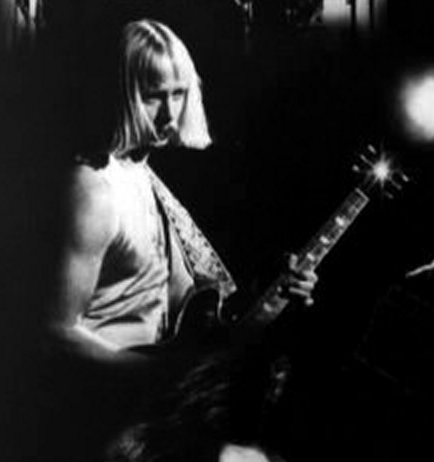
Kerry Livgren in 1976

Throughout the 1970s and into the early 1980s, Kerry Livgren had been guitarist, keyboardist, and principal composer for the successful American rock band, Kansas. During his tenure with the group, he had explored numerous eastern religions such as Hinduism and Buddhism. These themes often appeared in the lyrics to songs on early Kansas records such as Kansas, Song for America, and Masque.

Livgren became a born-again Christian in 1979, followed by Kansas bassist Dave Hope in 1980. The change of lyrical direction in Audio-Visions due to Livgren's conversion began to create a rift between the members of Kansas. The strong focus that Livgren placed on his Christian faith in lyrics of songs to be recorded for Vinyl Confessions, especially in "Crossfire", turned out to be the last straw for Kansas's original lead vocalist Steve Walsh, who left Kansas to form the band Streets in 1981.

The remaining Kansas members held numerous auditions to select a new lead vocalist that could effectively replace Steve Walsh's songwriting and singing skills. Eventually, John Elefante was hired as Walsh's replacement, but hopefuls Warren Ham and Michael Gleason left an impression on Kerry Livgren, who was in the process of writing material for a second solo album for CBS Records. Instead of using different musicians for each song as he had done on his 1980 solo album Seeds of Change, he would put together a single group consisting of himself, Dave Hope, Warren Ham, Michael Gleason and Dennis Holt.

During Kansas's time with John Elefante as lead vocalist and keyboardist, Livgren became increasingly uncomfortable with Kansas representing his Christian worldview. After a final New Year's Eve performance on December 31, 1983, Livgren and Hope left the band.

== 1983-1984: A new band - Time Line ==
In 1983, after Livgren's departure from Kansas, he finished recording his second self-produced album for CBS, Time Line, with himself on guitar and keyboard, Hope on bass, Ham on saxophone, flute, harmonica and vocals, Gleason on vocals, keyboards and guitar and Holt on drums. During sessions for the album, it became apparent that the musicians shared many interests, not the least of which was their Christian faith. After years of feeling isolated and artistically stifled in Kansas, Livgren found working with fellow Christians refreshing. By the end of the recording sessions, the session musicians had jelled, and Livgren decided to name the group AD. Time Line was released in 1984 and credited to Kerry Livgren/AD. It received virtually no promotion from CBS Records, who probably saw the side project as a threat to the continued success of Kansas. Due to legal entanglements caused by his contractual obligations with Kansas, Livgren was unable to market AD in the mainstream secular market. After negotiating with the record label, he received a waiver to perform with AD in the Christian rock market. This would become a hindrance to commercial viability for the band.

== 1985-1988: Art of the State to Prime Mover ==
AD toured extensively between 1983 and 1985, sometimes playing bars and clubs one night and then churches the next. Livgren has stated on several occasions that he experienced some of the highest and lowest points in his career during his time with AD. Livgren mentions in his book Seeds of Change: The Spiritual Quest of Kerry Livgren that his time playing live with AD was his best as a guitarist.

Art of the State was released in 1985 on Livgren's own Christian label, Kerygma Records, distributed by Sparrow Records, and was the first album credited to the band name AD. The group began touring, but were quickly discouraged by a lack of professionalism in the Christian venues. After the tour, Ham left the band, and the remaining four members decided to produce one more album before ending AD. Gleason was left to handle the lead vocals alone on the next album, appropriately titled Reconstructions. Due to financial difficulties, AD faded away in 1986 after its release, even though no official breakup was announced. In an interview, Livgren said that AD played its last gig in Detroit on December 31, 1985 but never received any more requests for shows after that, so the members just drifted off into other projects.

Although AD had been unofficially disbanded for two years, Livgren and Ham put together one more album to pay off band bills, with the band name reverting to Kerry Livgren/AD. Released in 1988, Prime Mover was a collection of previously unreleased AD songs. Livgren played all instruments, and all vocals were performed by Ham.

== 1989–present: Recent activity ==
In 1992, Livgren released a double-CD retrospective titled Decade, celebrating 10 years since his first solo recording. It included Livgren's first two solo albums Seeds of Change and Time Line in their entirety, plus tracks from other albums, including Art of the State, Prime Mover and One of Several Possible Musiks, and previously unreleased songs.

In the late 1990s, Livgren re-released Art of the State on his new independent record label, Numavox Records. A partially re-recorded version of Reconstructions was also released in 1997.

In 1997, Livgren discovered recordings of two AD performances from 1984 and 1985 that had been made by the soundboard engineer during the Art of the State tour. Though the recordings had not been made for release, Livgren remastered them and released them as a "thank you" to fans on a CD-R title called AD Live. The performances include mistakes and technical problems left intact and is meant as an archival release.

In 1998, Livgren mostly re-recorded Prime Mover and added five new songs and a new version of "Fair Exchange" from the Kansas album Vinyl Confessions in the reissue, Prime Mover II.

Shortly after the release of the Kansas album Somewhere to Elsewhere in 2000, Livgren began work on the album The Best of Kerry Livgren. Both retrospective and forward-looking, it contains tracks from all his solo releases and some AD tracks. The album also includes two new songs and new recordings of four older songs. Each of these new versions features the original vocalists, including Ham, Gleason, and Ronnie James Dio.

In 2008, Livgren reworked and reissued Prime Mover again as Prime Mover (Redux).

== Books ==
A revised and expanded edition of Livgren's 1985 autobiography, Seeds of Change: The Spiritual Quest of Kerry Livgren, co-written with Kenneth Boa, was released in 1991 that updated the book to cover his time with AD.

== Discography ==
- Time Line (1984, credited to Kerry Livgren/AD)
- Art of the State (1985, credited to AD)
- Reconstructions (1987, credited to AD)
- Prime Mover (1988, credited to Kerry Livgren/AD)
- Reconstructions Reconstructed (1997, credited to Kerry Livgren/AD)
- AD Live (1998)
- Prime Mover II (1998, credited to Kerry Livgren)
