= City on a Hill (series) =

Christian compilation album series

City On A Hill is a series of praise and worship music compilations performed by contemporary Christian musicians and produced by Steve Hindalong, Derri Daugherty, and Marc Byrd, who are current members of Christian rock band the Choir. The project includes

- City on a Hill: Songs of Worship and Praise (2000)
- City on a Hill: Sing Alleluia (2002)
- City on a Hill: It's Christmas Time (2002)
- City on a Hill: The Gathering (2003)

Artists who have collaborated on the various recordings include Jars of Clay, Third Day, Caedmon's Call, Sixpence None the Richer, Tait, Phil Keaggy, Sonicflood with Peter Furler, Terry Taylor, Gene Eugene, The Choir, FFH, Out of Eden, Silers Bald, Jennifer Knapp, Nichole Nordeman, Sara Groves, Andrew Peterson, Bebo Norman, Ginny Owens, Paul Colman Trio, Fernando Ortega and GlassByrd.

== Quotes ==
Our concept of "community," is one that takes the emphasis off of the particular artist who may have their name on the song, and places it where it belongs, in worship and exaltation of God.

— Steve Hindalong, Producer

Never before have so many artists joined together, and collaborated together, with one purpose - worshipping God. It's been amazing to see how these different groups have embraced the idea of working with each other.

— Robert Beeson, President, Essential Records
