= Art of the State =

Studio album by AD
- Released: 1985
- Genre: Christian rock
- Length: 43:19
- Label: Sparrow
- Producer: Kerry Livgren

AD chronology
| Time Line (1984) | Art of the State (1985) | Reconstructions (1987) |

Professional ratings
Review scores
| Source | Rating |
|---|---|
| AllMusic | 4/5 stars |

Art of the State is the first studio album by the Christian rock band AD, and the third solo album for its leader Kerry Livgren. The album was re-issued in the late 1990s under Livgren's new record label, Numavox Records.

== Background ==
In 1984, Kerry Livgren released Time Line, his second solo album, which was credited to Kerry Livgren/AD. The group AD was formally named by the end of the recording sessions. Because of contractual obligations to Kansas, Livgren was unable to market AD in the mainstream secular market. Due to Livgren's contractual obligations, AD could not be marketed in the mainstream secular market; after negotiations, Livgren received a waiver to perform with AD in the Christian rock market; This restriction became a hindrance to the band's commercial viability.

Realizing the limited options, the group accepted the offer and began work on their next record, which contained songs relating in strictly Christian themes. Livgren also decided with the others that AD should receive full credit for the production of the album, rather than the album being split half and half for its creation. The tour for the band, unfortunately, was not as successful as intended, resulting in Warren Ham's departure from the band after the tour for Art of the State had ended.

== Reception ==
Compared to review that Time Line received, AllMusic gave Art of the State a much more favorable review of four stars out of five; a drastic improvement from the 1984 release that both Livgren and AD took ownership of. Marked as a religious album, it was said to be unique in its own way and has created an enjoyable experience for the listener. It has been said to be strongly focused on songs of worship and praise while providing other songs of controversial subjects at the same time.

== Track listing ==
All songs written by Kerry Livgren, otherwise indicated

1. "All Creation Sings" - 4:22
2. "We Are the Men" - 4:41
3. "Lead Me to Reason" (Michael Gleason) - 3:56
4. "The Only Way to Have a Friend" - 4:16
5. "Games of Chance and Circumstance" (Gleason) - 4:18
6. "The Fury" - 5:34
7. "Progress" - 4:39
8. "Heartland" (Gleason) - 3:42
9. "Zion" (Warren Ham, Livgren) - 3:26
10. "Up from the Wasteland" (Gleason, Livgren) - 4:25

== Personnel ==
A.D.

- Michael Gleason – lead vocals (1, 5, 6, 10), backing vocals, keyboards, guitars
- Warren Ham – lead vocals (1–4, 7–9), backing vocals, keyboards, harmonica, woodwinds
- Kerry Livgren – keyboards, guitars
- Dave Hope – bass guitar
- Dennis Holt – drums, percussion, backing vocals

Additional vocals

- Debi Chapman (1, 10)
- Susan Shewbridge (1, 10)

Production

- Mark Ferjulian – executive producer
- Ken Marcellino – executive producer, art direction, front cover art concept
- Kerry Livgren – producer, engineer
- Michael Gleason – assistant engineer, front cover art concept
- Gary Westman – additional engineer
- Glenn Meadows – mastering at Georgetown Masters (Nashville, Tennessee)
- Bill Murphy – art direction
- Tim Wild – front cover illustrations
- FM Management – management
