= In Awe =

In Awe may refer to:

- "In Awe", an album by Midnite
- "In Awe", song by the Heritage Singers
- "In Awe", single by Sied van Riel with Waakop Reijers 2012
- "In Awe", song from Where I Belong (Revive album)
- "In Awe", song by Dan Macaulay
- In Awe, a 1997 book by Scott Heim
