= 19th GMA Dove Awards =

1988 US music awards ceremony

- Date: April 14, 1988
- Location: Nashville, Tennessee

The 19th Annual GMA Dove Awards were held on 1988 recognizing accomplishments of musicians for the year 1987. The show was held in Nashville, Tennessee.

== Award recipients ==
- Song of the Year
  - "In The Name Of The Lord"; Phil McHugh, Gloria Gaither, Sandi Patti; River Oaks Music, Sandi's Songs (BMI), Gaither Music (ASCAP)
- Songwriter of the Year
  - Larnelle Harris
- Male Vocalist of the Year
  - Larnelle Harris
- Female Vocalist of the Year
  - Sandi Patti
- Group of the Year
  - First Call
- Artist of the Year
  - Sandi Patti
- New Artist of the Year
  - Bebe & Cece Winans
- Southern Gospel Album of the Year
  - Symphony of Praise; The Cathedrals; Lari Goss; RiverSong
- Inspirational Album of the Year
  - The Father Hath Provided; Larnelle Harris; Greg Nelson; Benson Records
- Pop/Contemporary Album of the Year
  - Watercolour Ponies; Wayne Watson; Wayne Watson, Paul Mills; DaySpring
- Rock Album of the Year
  - Crack the Sky; Mylon LeFevre & Broken Heart; Mylon LeFevre, Joe Hardy; Myrrh Records
- Contemporary Gospel Album of the Year
  - Decisions (The Winans album); The Winans; Marvin Winans, Barry Hankerson, Carvin Winans, Michael Winans; Qwest/Warner Bros.
- Traditional Gospel Album of the Year
  - One Lord, One Faith, One Baptism; Aretha Franklin; Aretha Franklin; Arista Records
- Instrumental Album of the Year
  - The Wind & The Wheat; Phil Keaggy; Phil Keaggy, Tom Coomes; Colours
- Praise and Worship Album of the Year
  - The Final Word; Michael Card; Norbert Putnam; Sparrow
- Children's Music Album of the Year
  - Bullfrogs & Butterflies Part III; The Agapeland Singers & Candle; Tony Salerno; Sparrow
- Musical Album of the Year
  - A Son! A Savior!; Claire Cloninger, Gary Rhodes, Bob Krogstad; Word
- Short Form Music Video of the Year
  - "Stay for Awhile"; Amy Grant; Marc Ball; Jack Cole; Myrrh
- Long Form Music Video of the Year
  - The Big Picture Tour Video; Michael W. Smith; Brian Shipley; Stephen Bowlby; Reunion
- Recorded Music Packaging of the Year
  - John Summers, Erik Neuhaus Peaceful Meditation; Greg Buchanan
