= Trafalgar Street =

Trafalgar Street may refer to:

- Trafalgar Street, Brighton
- Trafalgar Street, Nelson, New Zealand
- Trafalgar Street (album), a 2006 album by Revive
