= Reconstructions (Kerry Livgren album) =

Studio album by AD
- Released: 1987
- Recorded: 1986
- Genres: Rock, Christian rock
- Length: 32:14
- Label: Sparrow
- Producer: Kerry Livgren

AD chronology
Art of the State (1985)	Reconstructions (1987)	Prime Mover (1988)

Professional ratings
Review scores
Source	Rating
AllMusic	3/5 stars
Kerrang!	4/5 stars

Reconstructions is the second studio album by the Christian rock group AD. It was re-released and remastered with the title Reconstructions: Reconstructed, with a different order of songs.

== Background ==
Warren Ham left AD after the end of the Art of the State Tour in 1985. As a result, he was not featured on the second album released by the band. Michael Gleason, who has worked with Livgren and the others in the past, replaces Ham on lead vocals on Reconstructions. Times were financially harder for the band following the release of Art of the State and with Ham's recent departure, the group decided that Reconstructions would be AD's final album as a group. The band's official breakup was never announced, as the group has dissipated from the inability to keep up with the lack of support.

== Reception ==
AllMusic gave the album a decent rating of three out of five, calling Reconstructions "A very strong record with excellent arrangements and excellent songwriting", yet recalling how many of the songs suffer in sound quality due to Kerry's inexperience as a strong worker in the field of sound engineering. Kerrang! rock music magazine gave the band's release a good rating of four out of five.

== Track listing ==
No.	Title	Writer(s)	Length
1.	"All Fall Down"	Michael Gleason, Kerry Livgren	4:27
2.	"Life of Crime"	Michael Gleason	4:16
3.	"No Standing"	Kerry Livgren	3:58
4.	"Exiles"	Kerry Livgren	4:15
5.	"We Draw the Line"	Kerry Livgren	3:43
6.	"Walking the Wire (With No Apologies to the Supreme Court)"	Michael Gleason	3:44
7.	"You Are the Distance"	Michael Gleason, Kerry Livgren	4:06
8.	"Highway to the Heart"	Michael Gleason	3:45
9.	"One Golden Thread"	Kerry Livgren	4:20
Total length:			32:14

== Personnel ==
A.D.

- Michael Gleason – lead vocals, backing vocals, keyboards
- Kerry Livgren – keyboards, guitars, percussion
- Dave Hope – bass
- Dennis Holt – drums, percussion

Additional vocals

- Terry Brock – backing vocals (2, 4-6, 8, 9)
- Keith Evans – backing vocals (7)

Production

- Kerry Livgren – producer, engineer
- Steve Hall – mastering at Future Disc (Hollywood, California)
- Jean Hoefel – art direction
- Jim Shanman – jacket design
