= Where I Belong (Revive album) =

Studio album by Revive
- Released: October 2004
- Recorded: Melbourne: Rangemaster, Crystal Mastering Studios, Sydney: Sony Studios
- Genre: Christian rock
- Length: 51:51
- Label: Koorong
- Producer: Phil Gaudion

Revive chronology
Where I Belong (2004)	Trafalgar Street (2006)

Professional ratings
Review scores
Source	Rating
Sydney Anglicans	link

Where I Belong is the debut full-length album by Australian Christian rock band Revive. It was released in October 2004 on Koorong, an independent record label, and produced by Phil Gaudion in Crystal Studios and Sony Studios.

== Background ==
Revive members Tyler Hall on guitar and Dave Hanbury on vocals had played together as Me + Ty, in Sydney, at local churches and schools through 2003; they released a single, "Going Up?". They were joined by Mike TenKate on drums and Rich Thompson on bass guitar, and became Revive in 2004. Hanbury recalled their first interstate trip to perform at a Queensland festival ended en route with a disabled van.

That night in the van, God was forcing us to rethink our band's true purpose. We realized our focus had blurred, but we came away from that night renewed, and refreshed in our purpose.

— Dave Hanbury, November 2004

By October 2004, they had released, Where I Belong on Koorong, an independent record label, as their debut album, which was produced by Phil Gaudion (from Paul Colman Trio) in Crystal Studios and Sony Studios.

== Track listing ==
1. "Find It Here" – 4:17
2. "Wash Away" – 3:51
3. "Power" – 3:38
4. "Where I Belong" – 4:25
5. "Carefree" – 4:09
6. "Forever" – 3:56
7. "In Awe" – 4:38
8. "Lift Me Up" – 3:32
9. "Coming Back" – 2:04
10. "Always" – 4:29
11. "You Know" – 12:52
  - Features hidden track "I'm a Punker" at 10:00

== Personnel ==
Revive members

- Tyler Hall – guitars: acoustic, lead
- Dave Hanbury – vocals
- Mike TenKate – drums
- Rich Thompson – bass guitar

Production details

- Producer – Phil Gaudion
  - Recorded at Rangemaster (David Carr's Studio, Melbourne), overdubs/mixes (Wyong, New South Wales)
- Mastering – Crystal Mastering Studios (Melbourne), Sony Music Studios (Sydney)
