= Time Line (AD album) =

Studio album by Kerry Livgren
- Released: September 1984
- Studios: Camp Dunwoody Studios (Dunwoody, Georgia)
- Genre: Progressive rock
- Length: 65:59
- Label: Kirshner
- Producer: Kerry Livgren

Kerry Livgren chronology
Seeds of Change (1980)	Time Line (1984)	Art of the State (1985)

Professional ratings
Review scores
Source	Rating
AllMusic	1.5/5 stars

Time Line is an album by American Christian rock musician Kerry Livgren, released in 1984. It features his newly formed band, AD.

== Background ==
After Kerry left his previous band, Kansas, in 1983, he and his newly formed crew began production for Livgren's second solo album. Time Line was made for CBS Records and was recorded with material created by the crew. While recording, Kerry and his new crew all shared the same interest in Christianity and all the members had come together to form AD by the end of the session. Due to a complication in the label release, Time Line was unable to receive much attention compared to some of Livgren's past works with Kansas.

== Reception ==
AllMusic gave the album one and a half stars out of five. The album was said to be "blatantly stale" throughout its duration, lacking the creativity that Seeds of Change provided.

== Track listing ==
All tracks written by Kerry Livgren except where noted

1. "Time Line" – 4:04
2. "Tonight" – 4:53
3. "Make or Break It" (Gleason) – 3:49
4. "Take Us to the Water" – 4:28
5. "Beyond the Pale" (Gleason, Livgren) – 3:33
6. "New Age Blues" (Gleason, Livgren) – 3:54
7. "Slow Motion Suicide" – 4:46
8. "High on a Hill" – 3:52
9. "Life Undercover" – 3:27
10. "Welcome to the War" – 5:11
11. "Interview with Kerry Livgren" – 24:08 (bonus track, only featured on 1996 reissue)

== Personnel ==
A.D.

- Michael Gleason – lead vocals, backing vocals, keyboards, percussion
- Kerry Livgren – keyboards, guitars, bass, DMX programming
- Dave Hope – bass guitar
- Dennis Holt – drums (1–5, 7, 9, 10), percussion
- Warren Ham – lead vocals, backing vocals, woodwinds, harmonica

Additional musicians

- David Pack – guitar licks (6)
- Scott Meeder – drums (6)
- Craig Harber – drums (8)
- John Elefante – percussion (1), backing vocals (1)
- Terry Brock – backing vocals (2, 8)
- Kyle Henderson – backing vocals (6)

Production

- Budd Carr – executive producer
- Mark Ferjulian – executive producer, design concept, management
- Ken Marcellino – executive producer, art direction, design concept, management
- Kerry Livgren – producer, engineer, design concept
- Michael Gleason – assistant producer (10), assistant engineer (10)
- Davey Moire – assistant producer (10), assistant engineer (10)
- Glenn Meadows – mastering at Georgetown Masters (Nashville, Tennessee)
- Frank Tozour – Sony release editing
- Rick Griffin – front cover illustration, logo design, design concept
- Mark Tucker – back cover photography
