= Prime Mover (album) =

Studio album by AD
- Released: 1988
- Recorded: 1986–1988
- Genres: Progressive rock, Christian rock
- Length: 40:27
- Label: Sparrow
- Producer: Kerry Livgren

AD chronology
Reconstructions (1987)	Prime Mover (1988)	One of Several Possible Musiks (1989)

Professional ratings
Review scores
Source	Rating
AllMusic	3/5 stars

Prime Mover is the third and final studio album by the Christian Rock band AD. Prime Mover has been re-released twice since its first release in 1988. It was re-recorded in 1998 and titled Prime Mover II, and released in 2008 with another title, Prime Mover (redux).

== Background ==
Three years after AD has faded away, Kerry Livgren and Warren Ham had decided to come together once more and create one more album under the band's name, in order to fix up the financial debts that ended the group in the first place and to say one last goodbye for all the effort and work that the musicians had done. All the songs that were released on the album had been written by Kerry (except for I'll Follow You) prior to Prime Mover's departure to the Christian Music Marketplace.

== Production ==
Compared to some of AD's works prior to Prime Mover, everyone in the five man band had a position and a part. Lacking this, Livgren and Ham were left as a duo to create the music themselves. Warren Ham contributed his role as the lead vocalist, while Kerry played most of the instruments, which included guitars, bass, drums and keyboards. While most of the songs were intriguing, two of the tracks out the full nine stood out the most. Portrait II was a remake of Portrait (He Knew), a song released by Kansas on their 1977 album Point of Know Return, in which the lyrics have been redone to tell the story of Christ rather than before with Albert Einstein. The other track, T.G.B, is a song that was deemed by most critics as "A fine piece of hard and blues rock".

== Reception ==
AllMusic gave the album three out of five stars and labeled it as a solid album, yet cheaply made and hastily recorded in studios. The review also claims that the album provided some of the best works that both Livgren and Ham have done together.

== Track listing ==
All songs written by Kerry Livgren except where noted.

1. "Don't Pass Me By" – 4:24
2. "Fathers and Sons" – 4:02
3. "Portrait II" (Livgren, Steve Walsh) – 5:40
4. "Children of the Shadows" – 4:57
5. "Wandering Spirit" – 4:06
6. "I'll Follow You" – 3:58 (Michael Gleason)
7. "New Kind of Love" – 3:51
8. "One More Song" – 4:15
9. "T.G.B." – 5:59

== Musicians ==
- Kerry Livgren - guitars, bass, drum programming, keyboards, background vocals
- Warren Ham - lead and background vocals, harmonica, woodwinds

Guest musicians

- Michael Gleason - songwriter and background vocals on I'll Follow You
- Dean Heitkamp - background vocals
