= Blink (Revive album) =

Studio album by Revive
- Released: June 22, 2010
- Genre: Christian rock
- Length: 39:41
- Label: Essential

Revive chronology
Chorus of the Saints (2009)	Blink (2010)

Singles from Blink
- 1. "Blink" Released: March 2010

Professional ratings
Review scores
Source	Rating
Jesus Freak Hideout	3/5 stars

Blink is an album from Christian rock band Revive released on June 22, 2010. Blink is their fourth studio album and second release on Essential Records.

== Track listing ==
No.	Title	Writer(s)	Length
1.	"Almost Missed this Moment"	Ben Glover, Dave Hanbury, Mike Tenkate, Rich Thompson	3:32
2.	"My Hope"	Tyler Hall, Hanbury, Jason Ingram, Tenkate, Thompson	4:02
3.	"Something Glorious"	Hall, Hanbury, Ingram, Tenkate, Thompson	3:28
4.	"Blink"	Hanbury, Ingram, Tenkate, Thompson	3:55
5.	"All of This Is for You"	Hanbury, Ingram, Tenkate, Thompson	3:59
6.	"Hold On Love"	Hanbury, Ingram, Tenkate, Thompson	3:36
7.	"Don't Give Up the Fight"	Glover, Hanbury, Tenkate, Thompson	3:14
8.	"Love Found Me"	Hall, Hanbury, Ingram, Tenkate, Thompson	3:30
9.	"We Were Meant to Be"	Hanbury, Phillip LaRue, Tenkate, Thompson	3:54
10.	"Love Rule Today"	Hall, Hanbury, Ingram, Paul Moak, Tenkate, Thompson	3:04
11.	"Welcome to Eternity"	Hall, Hanbury, Tenkate, Thompson	3:34
Total length:			39:41
