= City on a Hill: The Gathering =

Compilation album by Various Artists
- Released: September 23, 2003
- Genre: Contemporary Christian music
- Label: Essential

Series chronology
City on a Hill: It's Christmas Time (2002)	City on a Hill: The Gathering (2003)

Professional ratings
Review scores
Source	Rating
The Phantom Tollbooth	link
Jesus Freak Hideout	link
Christianity Today	link

City on a Hill: The Gathering is the fourth album released in the City on a Hill series of compilation albums by popular contemporary Christian musicians.

== Track listing ==
1. "Shall We Gather at River" - Prelude
2. "The Gathering" - Caedmon's Call, Dan Haseltine, Charlie Lowell, Bebo Norman, Sara Groves
3. "Kyrie Eleison" - Leigh Nash & friends
4. "Beautiful Scandalous Night" - Sixpence None the Richer and Bebo Norman
5. "Jesus Went to the Garden" - Derri Daugherty, Paul Colman, Dan Haseltine, Sara Groves, GlassByrd
6. "Table of the Lord" - FFH and Paul Colman
7. "Holy is the Lord" - Andrew Peterson
8. "We Will Trust You" - Ginny Owens and GlassByrd
9. "Come Thou Fount of Every Blessing" - Jars of Clay
10. "Come Be Who You Are" - Sara Groves
11. "Instrument of Peace" - Paul Colman Trio
12. "Hallelujah Never Ending" - Caedmon's Call and Silers Bald
13. "Open Your Eyes" - Ginny Owens
14. "Marvelous Light" - Dan Haseltine, Ginny Owens, and friends
