= Chorus of the Saints =

Chorus Of The Saints

Studio album by Revive
- Released: 2008
- Studio: Consuming Fire Productions
- Genre: Christian rock
- Length: 38:03
- Label: Essential
- Producer: Mac Powell, Revive

Revive chronology
Trafalgar Street (2006)	Chorus Of The Saints (2008)	Blink (2010)

Professional ratings
Review scores
Source	Rating
Jesus Freak Hideout	3.5/5 stars

Chorus of the Saints is the third full-length album by Australian Christian rock band Revive.

== Track listing ==
1. "Chorus of the Saints" – 3:26
2. "Can't Change Yesterday" – 3:21
3. "You Know" (featuring Mac Powell of Third Day) – 3:41
4. "Don't Look Anywhere Else" – 3:28
5. "Power" – 3:43
6. "Stay" – 3:37
7. "Distant Memories" – 3:18
8. "You're All I Need" – 3:30
9. "Wonder Why" – 3:17
10. "Sit With Me" – 3:53
11. "Promise of Tomorrow" - 3:00
12. "Welcome to Eternity" (available as a free download from website)
