= City on a Hill: It's Christmas Time =

Compilation album by Various artists
- Released: September 24, 2002
- Genres: Contemporary Christian music, Christmas music
- Length: 40:41
- Label: Essential

Series chronology
City on a Hill: Sing Alleluia (2002)	City on a Hill: It's Christmas Time (2002)	City on a Hill: The Gathering (2003)

Professional ratings
Review scores
Source	Rating
AllMusic	3/5 stars
The Christian Post	mixed
Crosswalk.com	positive
Jesus Freak Hideout	4/5 stars
The Phantom Tollbooth	4/5 stars

City on a Hill: It's Christmas Time, released on September 24, 2002, is the third album in the City on a Hill series of compilation albums by popular contemporary Christian musicians.

== Track listing ==
No.	Title	Writer(s)	Performer(s)	Length
1.	"I Heard the Bells on Christmas Day"	Henry Wadsworth Longfellow, John Baptiste Calkin	Steve Hindalong	0:32
2.	"It's Christmas Time"	Terry Scott Taylor, Steve Hindalong	Cliff Young, Danielle Young, Derri Daugherty, Sara Groves, Dan Haseltine Out of Eden, Leigh Nash, Michael Tait, Terry Scott Taylor, Mac Powell	3:11
3.	"Silent Night"	Joseph Mohr, Franz Gruber	Sixpence None the Richer	3:39
4.	"Holy Emmanuel"	Taylor, Hindalong	Terry Scott Taylor	2:51
5.	"Babe in the Straw"	Steve Hindalong, Derri Daugherty	Caedmon's Call	4:56
6.	"Child of Love"	Matthew West, Hindalong, Mark Lee	Sara Groves	3:25
7.	"Bethlehem Town"	Dan Haseltine, Charlie Lowell, Stephen Mason, Matt Odmark	Jars of Clay	4:35
8.	"Manger Throne"	Julie Miller	Third Day, Derri Daugherty, Julie Miller	3:25
9.	"Away in a Manger"	James R. Murray, William James Kirkpatrick, traditional	Julie Miller, Derri Daugherty	1:47
10.	"Do You Hear What I Hear?"	Noel Regney, Gloria Shayne	Out of Eden	3:00
11.	"In the Bleak Midwinter"	Christina Rosseti, Gustav Holst, traditional	Paul Colman Trio	3:47
12.	"O Holy Night"	Placide Cappeau, Adolphe Adam	Michael Tait, Leigh Nash	5:33
Total length:				40:41
