= Sun and Shield =

Studio album by Peter Furler Band
- Released: 11 March 2014
- Studios: IHOF Studios (Nashville, Tennessee)
- Genres: Christian rock, contemporary Christian music
- Length: 34:04
- Label: New Day/Platinum Pop
- Producers: Peter Furler, Steve Taylor, John Mark Painter

Sun and Shield is the debut album from Christian music group Peter Furler Band, and the album released on 11 March 2014 by New Day Christian Records and Platinum Pop Records. The producers of the album were Peter Furler and Steve Taylor.

== Critical reception ==
Professional ratings
Review scores
Source	Rating
CCM Magazine	4/5 stars
CM Addict	4/5 stars
Indie Vision Music	4/5 stars
Jesus Freak Hideout	3.5/5 stars 4/5 stars
Louder Than the Music	4/5 stars
New Release Tuesday	2.5/5 stars

Sun and Shield garnered generally positive reception from music critics. Andy Argyrakis of CCM Magazine rated the album four out of five stars, stating that Furler "translates his previous act's glory days to present tense." At Indie Vision Music, Jonathan Andre rated the album four stars out of five, writing that the release "provides us with sounds of what 3 piece acoustic pop/rock would sound like, and the result is ten tracks that speak about love, hope, life, God, emotion, encouragement and songs to declare out with fervent praise as Peter, Dave and Jeff solidly debut an album that’s destined to be a standout amongst CCM/pop/indie rock fans alike." David Bunce of CM Addict rated the album a four out of five stars, saying that he "recommend[s] this album, [because] it's creativity and uniqueness is seen from its clever lyrics, to its variety of instrumental hooks." At Louder Than the Music, Wesley Huntley rated the album four stars out of five, noting the lyricism as "both challenging and encouraging."

Jesus Freak Hideout reviewed the album four-times by Roger Gelwicks three-and-a-half stars, Mark Rice four stars, John DiBiase four stars and Michael Weaver three-and-a-half stars out of five on all of them. Gelwicks stating that the release "is not a terribly polished album, but it reminds Furler's fans of why they fell in love with his musical style in the first place", which "There's an aura of nostalgia that keeps the album afloat, and it's a unique pop effort that keeps 2014 favorably unpredictable." Rice saying that "In all honesty, this isn't the most unified effort I've ever heard, but it is far from disjointed and lacks any significant lackluster effort or filler, and the mid-1990s vibe hold it together better than anything else. But simply put, there is a lot to like here and very little to dislike." According to DiBiase he says that "It's a wonderful reminder of how diverse in style, topics and emotions Christian music can (and used to) be, and a great first effort from Peter Furler Band." Weaver writing that the release is "a bit refreshing" because "This may not be the best pop-rock album to come out this year, but it's pretty solid nonetheless."

At New Release Tuesday, Marcus Hathcock rated the album two-and-a-half stars out of five, stating that "Sun and Shield highlights lots of things that are good about Peter Furler, but sadly they're mired in a lot of sub-par production": however, he says that "If you can focus on the foundation of the songs, the incredible wordplay, and the fun Aussie-sounding musical licks, then you'll be in a good spot with this album."

== Commercial performance ==
For the Billboard charting week of 29 March 2014, Sun and Shield was the No. 23 Christian Album sold and it was the No. 37 Independent Album sold.

== Track listing ==
No.	Title	Writer(s)	Length
1.	"Sun and Shield"	Peter Furler, Steve Taylor, John Mark Painter, Jimmy Abegg	2:53
2.	"So High"	Furler, Taylor	3:08
3.	"Dare I Say"	Furler, Taylor	3:42
4.	"Shame"	Furler, Taylor	3:00
5.	"Yeshua" (featuring Mylon LeFevre)	Peter Furler, Summer Furler	4:11
6.	"The Overcomer"	Jeff Frankenstein, Furler, Taylor	3:18
7.	"It's Alright (For Lazarus)"	Furler, Taylor	4:06
8.	"Right Wrong Girl"	Furler, Taylor, Abegg	2:41
9.	"The High Road"	Furler, Taylor, Abegg, Painter	3:06
10.	"We Won't Forget"	Furler, Taylor, Painter, Abegg	3:59
Total length:			34:04

== Personnel ==
=== Band Members ===
- Peter Furler – vocals, guitars
- Dave Ghazarian – bass
- Jeff Irizarry – drums

Additional musicians

- John Mark Painter
- Jimmy Abegg
- Steve Taylor
- Blair Masters
- Phil Joel
- Jeff Frankenstein – additional programming (6)
- Mylon LeFevre – vocals (5)

=== Production ===
- Peter Furler – producer, additional photography
- John Mark Painter – producer, recording
- Steve Taylor – producer
- Jimmy Abegg – co-producer, additional photography
- Michael Howell – additional engineer (5)
- F. Reid Shippen – mixing at Robot Lemon (Nashville, Tennessee)
- Dan Shike – mastering at Tone and Volume Mastering (Nashville, Tennessee)
- Gerard Beckham – design, cover photography, additional photography
- David Dobson – additional photography
- Phil Joel – additional photography
- Lindsey Little – additional photography
- Max Hsu – additional photography

== Chart performance ==
Chart (2014)	Peak position
US Christian Albums (Billboard)	23
US Independent Albums (Billboard)	37
