= Give Me Jesus =

American Christian spiritual song

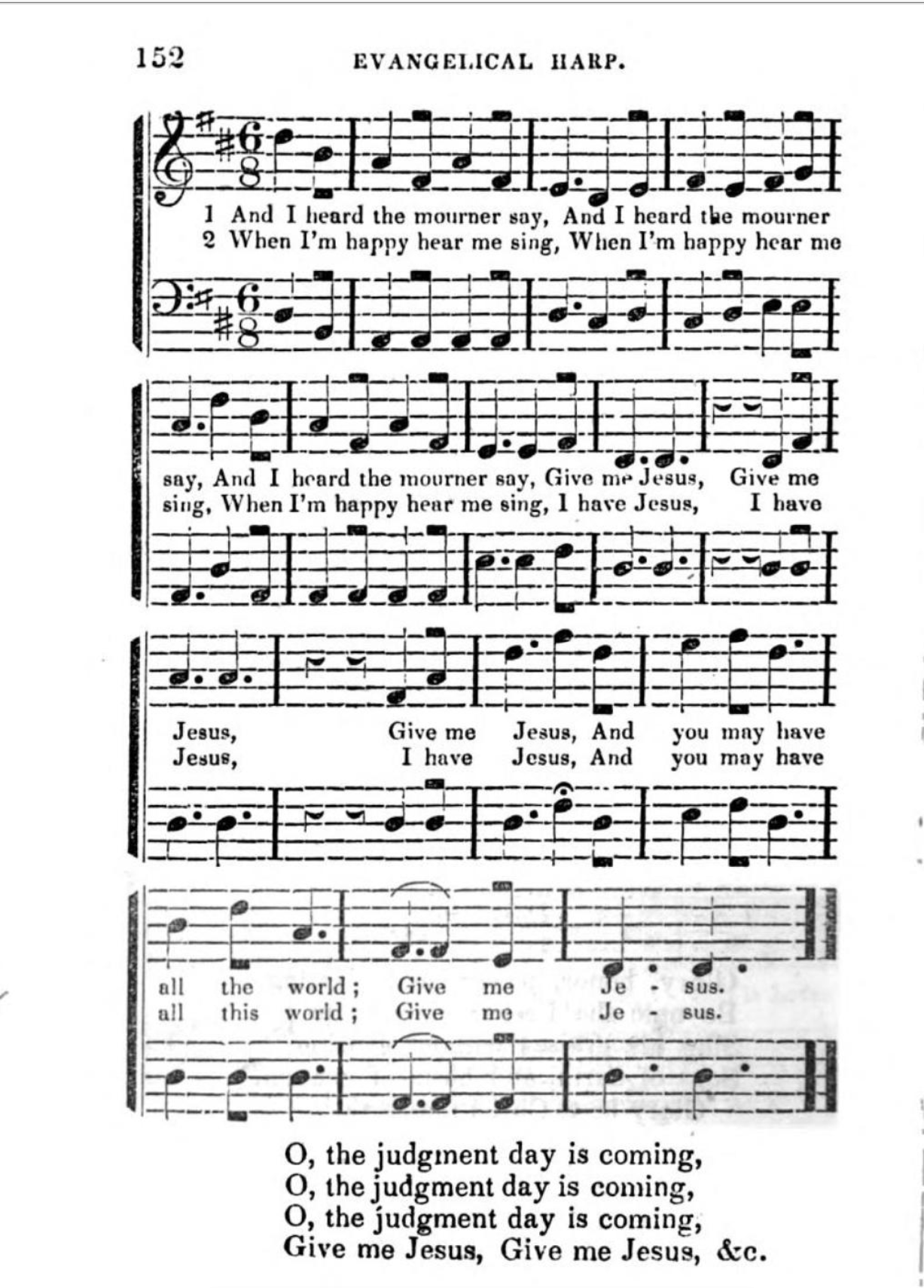
Early version of "Give Me Jesus" as published in the Evangelical Harp in 1845

Give Me Jesus (also known as And I Heard the Mourner Say) is a traditional American Christian spiritual song. The song references Matthew 16 (Matthew 16:26) and other passages in the Book of Matthew regarding the Judgment Day.

Possibly the earliest known version of "Give Me Jesus" was published in the United States in 1845 by the Rev. Jacob Knapp, a Baptist minister from New York. By 1849 the Methodists published a version, and the song was popularized in the mid-nineteenth century through various camp meetings and hymnals. "Give Me Jesus" was popular among African American congregations, and Slave Songs of the United States (1867) mentions that former slaves in Port Royal, South Carolina, sang it, although the song may not have originated solely with slaves, as it was published previously by the Methodists. However, African American congregations likely influenced its modern form. In 1873 the Fisk Jubilee Singers published a version of the song that remains popular today. Notable nineteenth-century songwriters published versions and derivations of the song, including Fanny Crosby with "Take the World, But Give Me Jesus", and musicians such as Vince Gill and Fernando Ortega have covered and interpreted the song in the twenty-first century.

Minnesota Twins third baseman Gio Urshela uses the song as his walk-up song during at-bats at Target Field.
