= Jacob Knapp =

American Baptist preacher and hymnwriter (1799–1874)

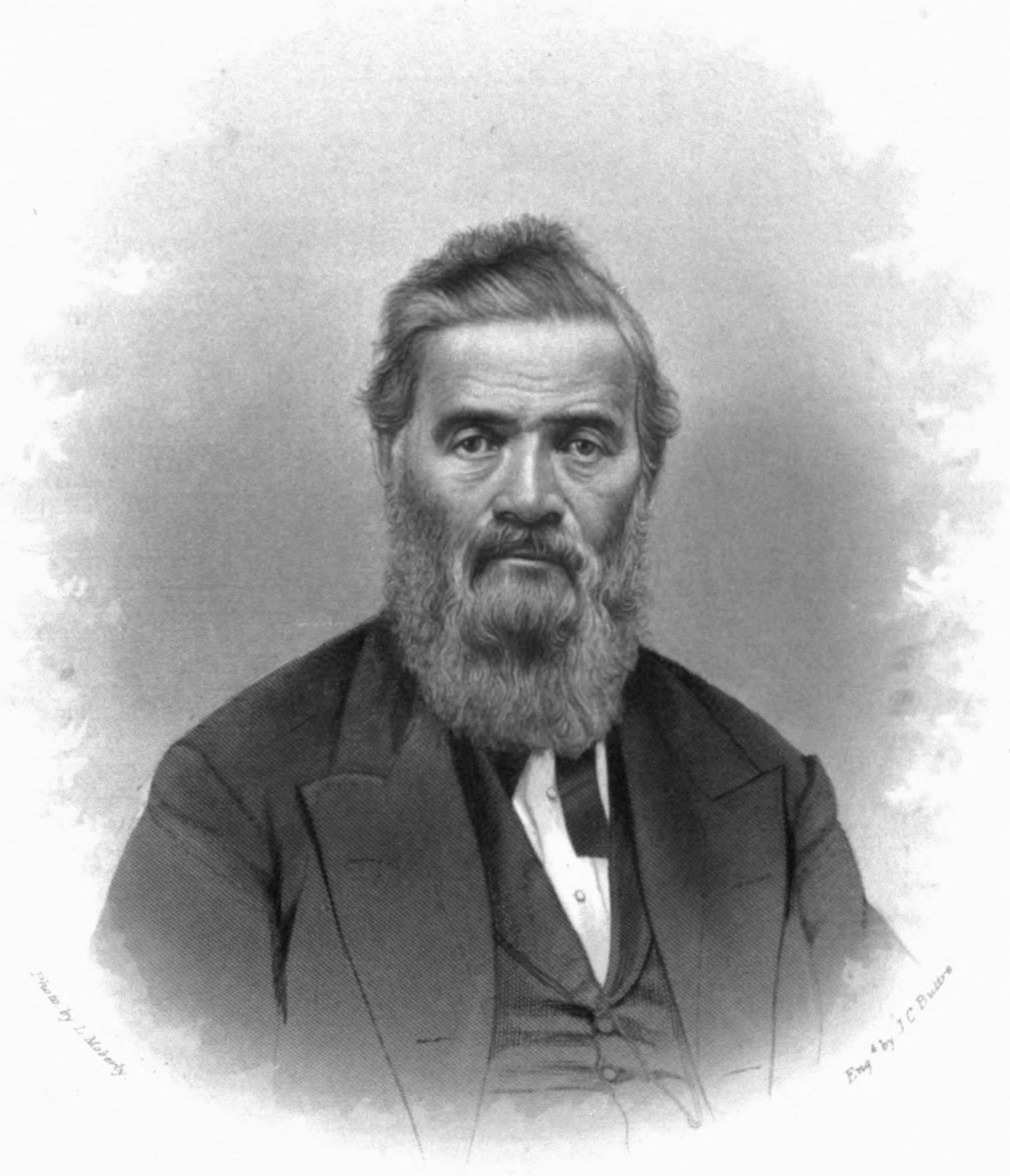

Signature
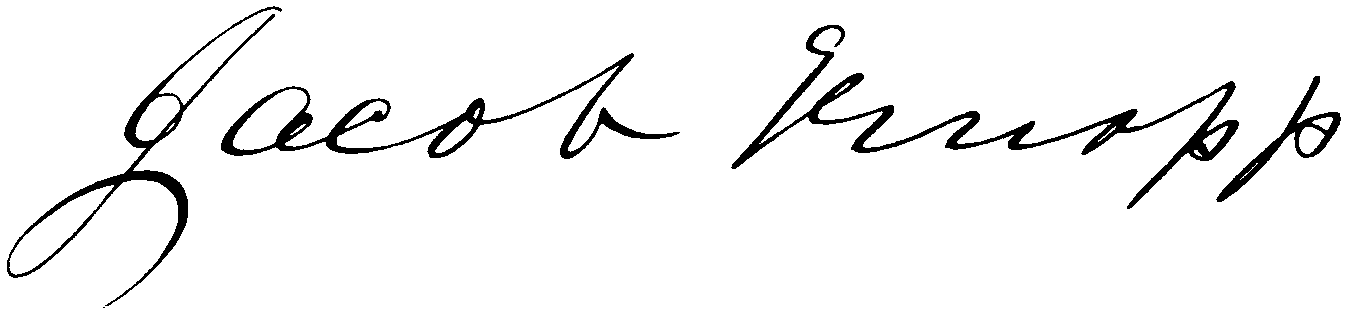

Jacob Knapp (December 7, 1799, Otsego County, New York - March 2, 1874, Rockford, Illinois) was a popular Baptist preacher of the 19th-century United States.

== Biography ==
He entered the theological institution (now Colgate University) at Hamilton, New York, in 1821, and began active work as pastor of the Baptist church in Springfield, New York, where he also managed a farm. From there he moved to Watertown, New York, where he was also at the same time pastor of a church and manager of a large farm, displaying a full degree of energy and capacity in each occupation.

In 1832 he experienced deeper religious impressions, which he himself was accustomed to call his second conversion. He gave up his secular employment, and undertook a wider work as an evangelist. He applied to the New York State Baptist convention for appointment as their missionary, but, as they hesitated to appoint him, he began preaching as an evangelist on his own responsibility. He preached at first in school houses and obscure churches, but was soon sought by the largest churches and most distinguished pastors. In Baltimore, Boston, and New York, vast numbers attended his preaching, and such excitement prevailed that mobs threatened him and his hearers, and the protection of the civil authorities was necessary. His preaching was stern and terrible, yet cultivated and able men were moved by it, as well as the populace. Thousands believed themselves converted under his ministry.

In 1845 Knapp published a collection of hymns entitled The Evangelical Harp: A New Collection of Hymns and Tunes Designed for Revivals of Religion, and For Family and Social Worship, which was the first publication of various popular hymns including "Give Me Jesus."

A few years before his death he visited California. In his old age he had acquired, by several judicious business investments, a comfortable competency, which he proposed shortly before his death to distribute among the benevolent societies of his church.
