= One of Several Possible Musiks =

Studio album by Kerry Livgren
- Released: 1989
- Genre: Progressive rock
- Length: 41:29
- Label: Grandyzine Productions
- Producer: Kerry Livgren

Kerry Livgren chronology
Prime Mover (1988)	One of Several Possible Musiks (1989)	When Things Get Electric (1995)

Professional ratings
Review scores
Source	Rating
AllMusic	4.5/5 stars

One of Several Possible Musiks is the sixth solo album by musician Kerry Livgren. The album won a Dove Award for Instrumental Album of the Year.

== Reception ==
In his review, Allmusic editor Mark W.B. Allender praises Kerry Livgren's work as, "a spectacular collection of songs that highlight Livgren's prowess as a composer better than any of his previous releases and his ability as a performer free to explore musically with little restraint. Great guitar work abounds, and it is mystical, almost dreamy in places."

== Track listing ==
1. "Ancient Wing" - 4:12
2. "And I Saw, as It Were...Konelrad" - 4:53
3. "Colonnade Gardens" - 4:07
4. "In the Sides of the North" - 4:22
5. "Alenna in the Sun" - 4:16
6. "Tannin Danse" - 3:34
7. "The Far Country" - 3:43
8. "Diaspora" - 3:32
9. "A Fistful of Drachma" - 4:05
10. "Tenth of Nisan" - 4:45

== Personnel ==
- Kerry Livgren - multi instruments, producer, composer, engineer, mixing
- Glenn Meadows - mastering

== Accolades ==
GMA Dove Award

Year	Winner	Category
1990	One of Several Possible Musiks	Instrumental Album of the Year
