= Forlorn Strangers =

US musical group

- Origin: Nashville, Tennessee
- Genres: Americana
- Years active: 2013–present
- Members: Chris Banke; Abigail Dempsey; Hannah Leigh; Benjamin Lusk; Jesse Thompson
- Website: www.forlornstrangers.com

Forlorn Strangers were an American americana band from Nashville, Tennessee.

== Career ==
Forlorn Strangers released their first EP, While The Grass Grows, in September 2013. In January 2015, the band released their second EP titled American Magic Tricks. In August 2016, the group released their self-titled debut album.

== Band members ==
- Chris Banke (vocals/guitar)
- Abigail Dempsey (vocals/fiddle)
- Hannah Leigh (vocals/mandolin)
- Benjamin Lusk (vocals/banjo, guitar, piano)
- Jesse Thompson (upright bass/dobro/pedal steel)

== Discography ==
Studio albums

- Forlorn Strangers (2016)

EPs

- While The Grass Grows (2013)
- American Magic Tricks (2015)
