= Fernando Ortega =

American singer

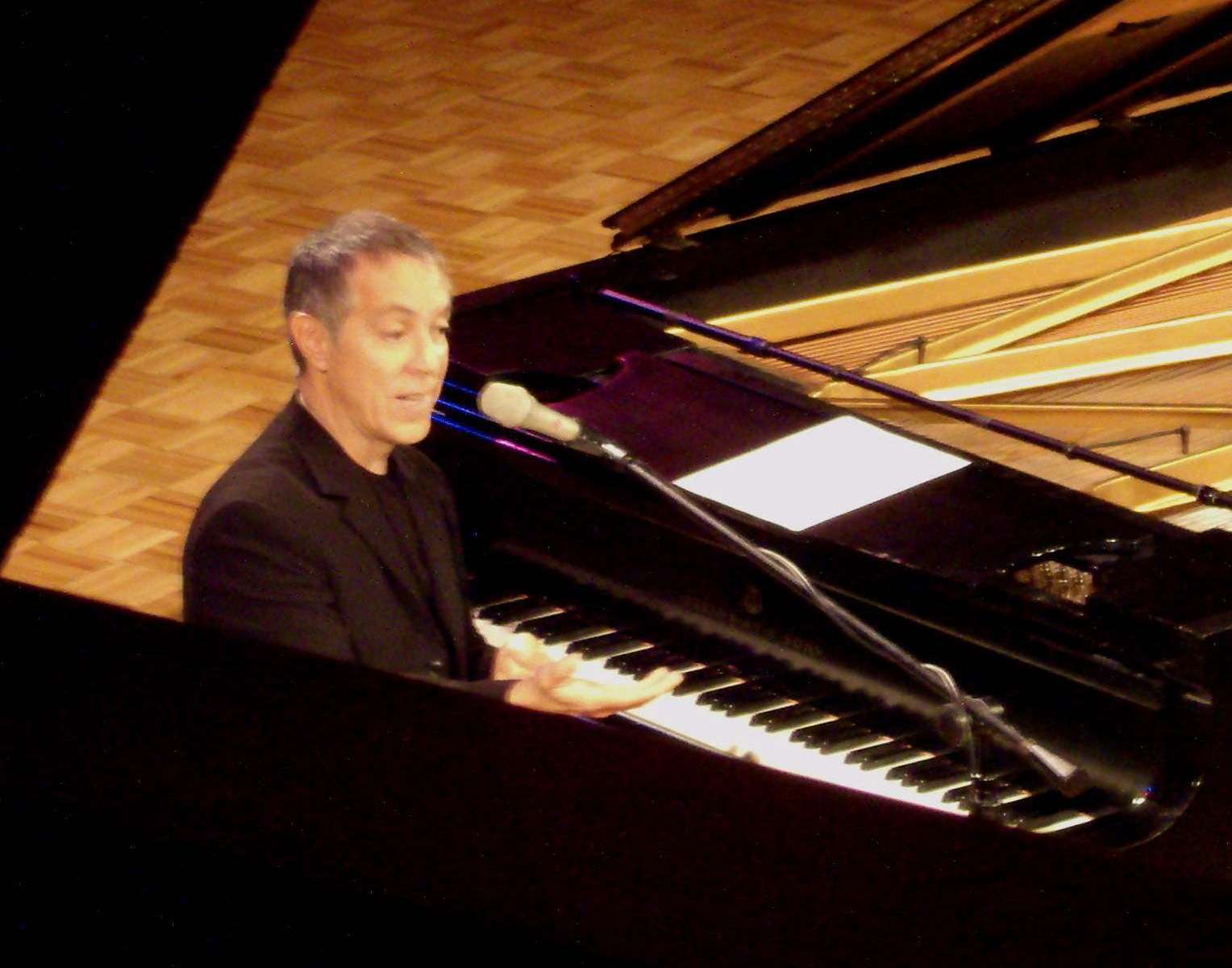
- Ortega in 2008
- Born: Juan Fernando Ortega; March 2, 1957 (age 69); Albuquerque, New Mexico, U.S.
- Education: Music at the University of New Mexico
- Known for: Christian singer, songwriter
- Website: fernandoortega.com

Juan Fernando Ortega (born March 2, 1957) is a singer-songwriter in contemporary Christian music. He is noted both for his interpretations of many traditional hymns and songs, such as "Give Me Jesus", "Be Thou My Vision" and "Praise to the Lord, the Almighty", and for writing clear and easily understood songs such as "This Good Day".

== Biography ==
Ortega was born and raised in Albuquerque, New Mexico, near the banks of the Rio Grande. He started learning piano at eight years of age. Through his father's work with the United States Department of State, he also spent time in Ecuador and Barbados. His family lived in Chimayó, New Mexico, for eight generations, a legacy cited as an influence on his music.

Ortega graduated from Valley High School and the University of New Mexico, where he received his bachelor's degree in music education. He is a member and former worship leader at an Anglican church in Albuquerque.

It is from his heritage and classical training at the University of New Mexico that Ortega derives his sound, embracing country, classical, Celtic, Latin American, world, modern folk and rustic hymnody.

== Discography ==
=== Studio albums ===
- In a Welcome Field (1991/2000)
- Meditations of the Heart - piano solos (1993)
- Hymns and Meditations (1994)
- Night of Your Return (1996)
- This Bright Hour (1997)
- The Breaking of the Dawn (1998)
- Home (2000)
- Camino Largo (2001)
- Storm (2002)
- Hymns of Worship (2003)
- Fernando Ortega (2004)
- Beginnings (2005)
- The Shadow of Your Wings: Hymns and Sacred Songs (2006)
- Christmas Songs (2008)
- Meditations of the Heart: Encore – piano solos (2011)
- Come Down O Love Divine (2011)
- The Crucifixion Of Jesus (2017)

=== Compilation Albums ===
- Fernando Ortega: The Ultimate Collection (2014)
- Best Of – Live In St. Paul – CD (2015)
- Give Me Jesus: The Biggest Hits of Fernando Ortega (2017)

=== EPs ===
- Give Me Jesus (1999)
- Lo, How a Rose E'er Blooming (2020)
- Jesus, Bread of Life (2024)

=== Singles ===
- My Song is Love Unknown (2017)
- Dark Eyes (2021)

=== Other appearances ===
- Promise Keepers: The Making of a Godly Man ("Jehová, Señor De Los Cielos" and "Jesus, You Are My Life") (1997)
- Calvary Chapel Music Praise, Vol. 1: Give Thanks to the Lord ("How I Love You Lord" and "Teach Me Your Ways") (1999)
- Calvary Chapel Worship Alive, Vol. 1 ("I Will Delight" and "Lord, Listen to Your Children Praying") (1999)
- A Collection of Hymns - Next Door Savior ("How Deep the Father's Love For Us") (2003)
- The Odes Project, Vol. 1 & 2 ("Sing Allelu" and "I Stretched Out My Hands") (2008)

== Charts ==
Storm reached No. 197 on the Billboard 200 in 2002.

Christmas Songs reached No. 36 on the Billboard Christmas Album Chart in 2009.

== Awards ==
Dove Awards

- 1998
  - Bluegrass Song: "Children of the Living God"
- 2000
  - Inspirational Album: Home
- 2002
  - Special Event Album of the Year: City on a Hill: Sing Alleluia (various artists)

== Gallery ==
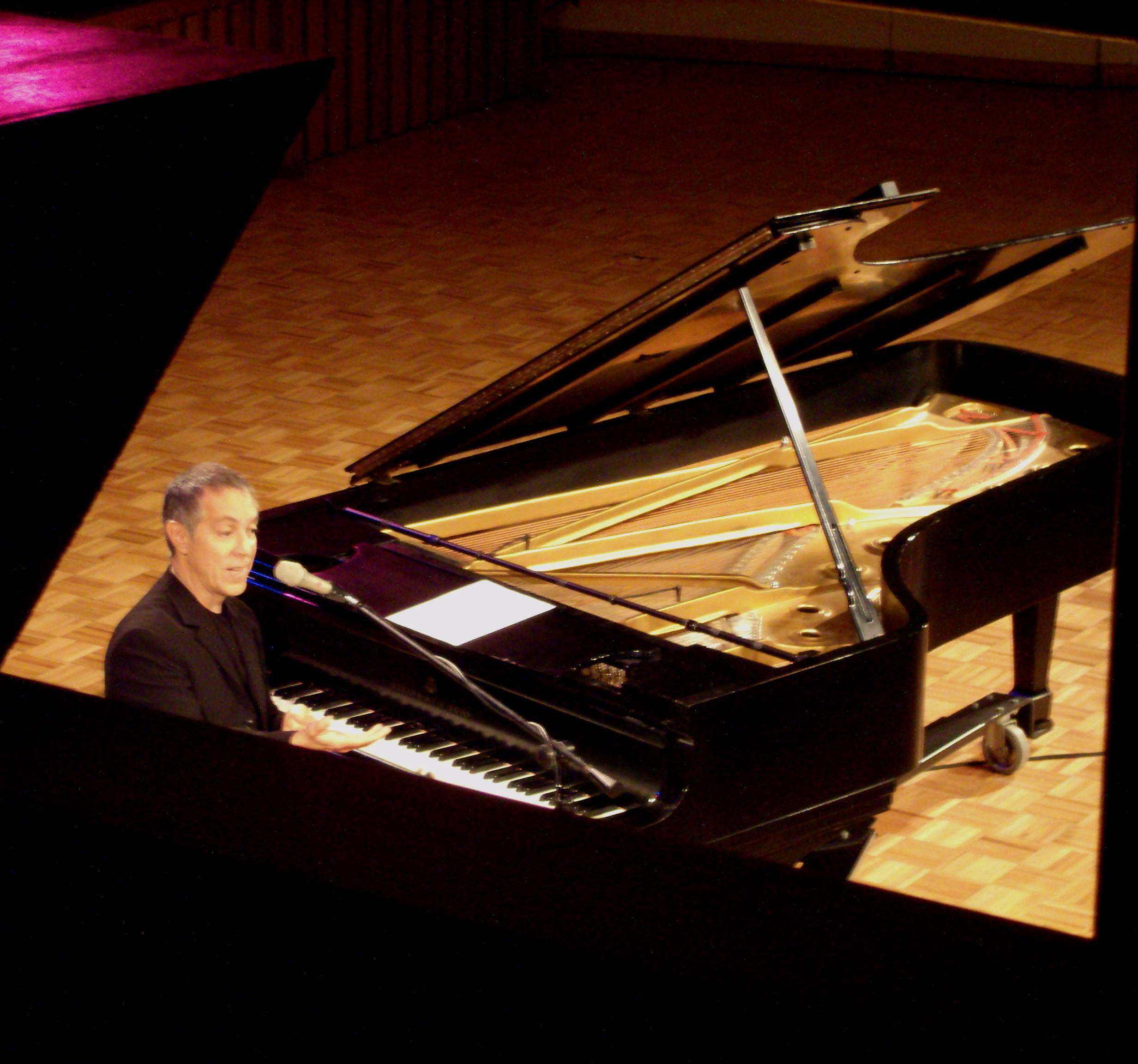
Fernando Ortega performing at Taylor University
