= Phil Gaudion =

Australian professional drummer

Phil Gaudion is an Australian professional drummer who played for the Paul Colman Trio. He is from Melbourne. He started drumming at the age of twelve and guitar at age 10.

Paul Colman Trio was nominated for a Grammy Award in the Pop-Contemporary Gospel category in 2003 and also won a Dove Award for New Artist of the Year in 2003.

After disbanding with the trio in 2004, Phil returned to his homeland.

He continues to be involved in music as a producer, engineer, mastering engineer and session drummer in his home town of Melbourne Australia.

Instagram Page
