= Peter Furler =

Australian musician (born 1966)

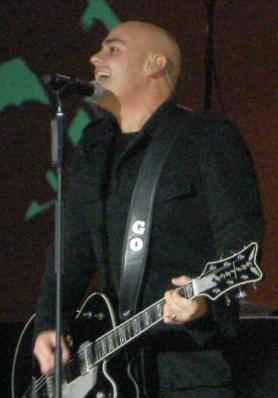
- Furler performing in March 2009

Background information
- Born: Peter Andrew Furler; 8 September 1966 (age 59); McLaren Vale, South Australia, Australia
- Origin: South Australia, Australia
- Genres: Christian pop; Christian rock
- Occupations: Singer; record label executive; songwriter
- Instruments: Vocals; guitar; drums
- Years active: 1986–present
- Member of: Steve Taylor & The Perfect Foil; Peter Furler Band
- Formerly of: Newsboys
- Spouse: Summer LeFevre (m. 1991)
- Website: www.peterfurler.com
- Relatives: Sia Furler (cousin)

Peter Andrew Furler (born 8 September 1966) is an Australian musician, songwriter, producer and record executive, best known as the co-founder and lead vocalist of the Christian rock band Newsboys from 1986 to 2009.

== Biography ==
Furler was born in McLaren Vale, South Australia on 8 September 1966, the third of six children of missionaries Bill and Rosalie Furler. Furler formed the Newsboys in 1985 with friends George Perdikis, Sean Taylor, and John James. He has written and produced most of Newsboys' songs, as well as co-writing/producing songs for other recording artists. He also frequently collaborated with Steve Taylor. Furler was originally the band's drummer and shared lead vocal duties, but became the band's primary lead singer after the departure of John James in 1997.

In July 1999, Furler, along with fellow Australians Dale Bray and Wes Campbell, founded Inpop Records.

In 2009, Furler left the Newsboys and began pursuing a solo career. He continued to make special appearances on tour with the band until his final appearance on 11 September 2009, in Orlando, Florida. Furler released his debut solo album, On Fire, on 21 June 2011 . The first single from the album, "Reach", was released to radio 25 March 2011 for sale on 19 April 2011. Furler participated in the Winter Jam 2012 tour.

In 2010, Furler became the drummer for longtime Newsboys songwriting collaborator Steve Taylor's new band, Steve Taylor & The Perfect Foil. Their album, Goliath, was released on 18 November 2014. Furler also played drums for former Newsboy Phil Joel's album deliberateKids2.

Furler formed the Peter Furler Band in 2012. The band includes Dave Ghazarian (formerly of Superchick and Audio Adrenaline) on bass and Jeff Irizarry on drums. Their album, Sun and Shield, was released on 11 March 2014.

On 7 October 2014, Furler released Christmas, his first Christmas album, on which he collaborated with pianist and guitarist David Ian.

In 2017, Furler collaborated with the Newsboys again for "The Cross Has the Final Word" single, which was his first involvement in the band since leaving in 2009. In 2018, he and Phil Joel began touring with Newsboys as Newsboys United. They released the album United in 2019. Furler once again departed the group in 2022.

== Personal life ==
Furler married Summer Andrea LeFevre, daughter of musician Mylon LeFevre, on 12 March 1991.

He is the cousin of singer-songwriter Sia.

== Discography ==
=== With Newsboys ===
- (1988) Read All About It, drums and vocals
- (1990) Hell Is for Wimps, drums and vocals
- (1991) Boys Will Be Boyz, drums and vocals
- (1992) Not Ashamed, lead vocals (shared with John James), drums, songwriting and co-production (shared with Steve Taylor)
- (1994) Going Public, lead vocals (shared with John James), drums, programming, songwriting and co-production (shared with Steve Taylor)
- (1996) Take Me To Your Leader, lead vocals (shared with John James and Phil Joel), drums, guitar, keyboard, harmonica, kazoo, songwriting and co-production (shared with Steve Taylor)
- (1998) Step Up to the Microphone, lead vocals (shared with Jody Davis and Phil Joel), guitar, drums, songwriting and production
- (1999) Love Liberty Disco, lead vocals, guitar, drums, songwriting and production
- (2002) Thrive, lead vocals, guitar, drums, songwriting and production
- (2003) Adoration: The Worship Album, lead vocals, guitar, drums, songwriting and production
- (2004) Devotion, lead vocals, guitar, drums, songwriting and production
- (2006) GO, lead vocals, guitar, drums, songwriting and production
- (2009) In the Hands of God, lead vocals, guitar, drums, songwriting and production
- (2019) United, lead vocals, guitar, drums, songwriting and co-production (shared with Geoff Duncan)

=== Solo ===
==== Studio albums ====
List of studio albums, with selected chart positions
Title	Album details	Peak chart positions				
Title	Album details	US	US Christ.	US Indie	US Current	US Jazz
On Fire	Released: 21 June 2011; Label: Sparrow Records; Formats: CD, digital download	91	2	—	82	—
Sun and Shield (Peter Furler Band)	Released: 11 March 2014; Label: New Day/Platinum Pop; Formats: CD, digital download	—	23	37	199	—
Christmas (featuring David Ian)	Released: 7 October 2014; Label: Prescott; Formats: CD, digital download	—	—	—	—	15

==== Singles ====
Year	Single	Album	Peak chart positions (US Billboard Christian charts)					
Year	Single	Album	Christian	Digital	AC	AC Indic	CHR	Inspo
2011	"Reach"	On Fire	7	27	9	5	8	15
2012	"Matter of Faith"	On Fire	34	–	–	15	29	–
2012	"I'm Alive"	On Fire	17	–	20	16	17	–
2014	"Sun and Shield"	Sun and Shield (Peter Furler Band)	–	–	–	–	–	–
2014	"So High"	Sun and Shield (Peter Furler Band)	–	–	–	–	–	–
2015	"The Overcomer"	Sun and Shield (Peter Furler Band)	–	–	–	–	–	–
2015	"It's Alright (For Lazarus)"	Sun and Shield (Peter Furler Band)	–	–	–	–	–	–

==== Compilation contributions and featured songs ====
Released	Song	Album	Label(s)
23 September 2011	"No Compromise (Daniel)"	Music Inspired by The Story	EMI Christian Music
5 May 2017	"The Cross Has the Final Word" (Newsboys featuring Peter Furler)	United (Deluxe Edition)	Fair Trade Services
	"Greatness of Our God" (Newsboys featuring Peter Furler)	United	Fair Trade Services
21 March 2019	"Symphony" (Newsboys featuring Peter Furler)	United	Fair Trade Services
	"This I Know" (Newsboys featuring Peter Furler)	United	Fair Trade Services
