= City on a Hill: Sing Alleluia =

Compilation album by Various Artists
- Released: February 19, 2002
- Genre: CCM
- Label: Essential

Series chronology
City on a Hill: Songs of Worship and Praise (2000)	City on a Hill: Sing Alleluia (2002)	City on a Hill: It's Christmas Time (2002)

Professional ratings
Review scores
Source	Rating
Jesus Freak Hideout	(not rated)
Moody Magazine	(series review)
The Phantom Tollbooth	(not rated)
Worship Music.com	(not rated)

City on a Hill: Sing Alleluia was released in 2002. The album is the second in the City on a Hill series of compilation albums by popular contemporary Christian musicians. The album received the Gospel Music Association's Special Event Album of the Year award for 2003.

== Track listing ==
1. "All Creatures of Our God and King" (choral prelude)
2. "Sing Alleluia" - Jennifer Knapp & Mac Powell (of Third Day)
3. "Holy Is Your Name" - Bebo Norman, Cliff & Danielle Young (of Caedmon's Call)
4. "You Are Holy" - Nichole Nordeman
5. "Our Great God" - Mac Powell (of Third Day) & Fernando Ortega
6. "Marvelous Light" - Derek Webb
7. "The Comforter Has Come" - Jars of Clay
8. "Shine Your Light" - Nichole Nordeman & FFH
9. "Hide Me In Your Heart" - FFH
10. "Hallowed" - Jennifer Knapp & Phil Keaggy
11. "Lift Up Your Hearts (Sursum Corda)" - Derri Daugherty
12. "Communion" - Cliff & Danielle Young (of Caedmon's Call) & Phil Keaggy
13. "All Creatures of Our God and King" (choral postlude)
