= Drumstick =

Drumstick may refer to:

- Drum stick, a tool for playing drums
- The drumstick tree, Moringa oleifera, or the pods and leaves of that tree used as a vegetable
- Drumstick (frozen dairy dessert), a brand of frozen dairy dessert
- Drumstick (poultry), the leg of a bird used as food
- Drumstick (video game character), a video game character found in Diddy Kong Racing
- Drumstick, a chewy candy by Swizzels Matlow
- Shevagyachya Shenga or Drumsticks, a 1955 Marathi language Indian film
- Neutrophil drumstick, a drumstick-shaped appendage in the cell nucleus of a neutrophil which contains the inactivated X chromosome
