= Revive (band) =

American Christian rock band

- Origin: Australia
- Genres: Christian rock
- Years active: 2001–2011
- Past members: Dave Hanbury; Tyler Hall; Rich Thompson; Mike Tenkate; A.J. Cheek; Michael Wright

Revive (sometimes styled Rev!ve) was an Australian Christian rock band, originally consisting of singer Dave Hanbury, guitarist Tyler Hall, bassist Rich Thompson, and drummer Mike Tenkate.

== History ==
The band was formed by Hanbury and Hall in Sydney, Australia in 2001. Both had been songwriters for youth groups and school ministries. After recruiting Thompson and Tenkate, they released their debut album Where I Belong in 2004. After their second album Trafalgar Street was released in 2006, they supported Third Day on an Australian tour. The band relocated to Atlanta, Georgia in 2007, and recorded their third album Chorus of the Saints with Third Day's Mac Powell producing. Along with Third Day, the band have cited Switchfoot and Steven Curtis Chapman as influences.

Hall left the band in 2009 to return to Australia and was replaced by Nevertheless guitarist A.J. Cheek. This lineup released the album Blink in 2010. That year they participated in the "Fly Me to the Show" tour with several other Christian rock acts. Tenkate then left the band and was replaced by Michael Wright. After a tour with Anthem Lights, the band broke up in 2011.

== Awards ==
- Runner up for best Gospel song at the Oz Music Awards 2005
- Nominated best Gospel group at the Australian Gospel Music Awards 2005
- Runner up for best Gospel song at the Australian Gospel Music Awards 2005
- WINNER best gospel video at the Australian Gospel Music Awards 2006
- International Song writing competition finalist in 2005 and in 2007 for best Gospel song
- 2007 music Oz WINNER of Best Christian song Can't Change Yesterday.
- 2007 WINNER of Australian Gospel Music Awards for Best Rock Song These Days
- Nominated for "New Artist of the Year" at the 2010 Dove Awards

== Discography ==
=== Albums ===
Year	Title	Label
2004	Where I Belong	Independent
2006	Trafalgar Street	Independent
2008	Chorus of the Saints	Essential
2010	Blink	Essential

=== Singles ===
Year	Title	Album
January 2009	"Chorus of the Saints"	Chorus of the Saints
January 2010	"Blink"	Blink
August 2010	"Almost Missed This Moment"	Blink
October 2010	"Something Glorious"	Blink
October 2010	"The First Noel"	The Essential Christmas Collection

== Trivia ==
- The Song "Blink" was featured in the preview for the ABC Drama Rookie Blue
- The Song "Something Glorious" was featured in the preview for ABC Drama Secret Millionaire
- The Song "Can't Change Yesterday" was featured on an episode of The Gospel Music Channel's Kitchen Sink.
- The Song "Can't Change Yesterday" was also featured on the Australian version of Jamie's Kitchen.
- Revive was listed as Billboard's list of bands to watch in 2009—the only Christian band on the list.
- "The First Noel" single climbed as high as number 8 on the Christian AC Chart (01/08/2011).
