= Peter Furler Band =

Christian music duo

Peter Furler & Phil Joel
- Origin: Australia and United States
- Genres: Christian rock, contemporary Christian music
- Years active: 2012–present
- Labels: New Day Christian (independent), Platinum Pop (independent)
- Members: Peter Furler; Phil Joel
- Past members: Jeff Irizarry; Dave Ghazarian; Jared Byers; Paul Colman
- Website: peterfurler.com

The Peter Furler Band is a Christian rock band from both Australia and the United States. It started in 2012 by Peter Furler, and the band released their first album Sun and Shield in 2014 on their independent label New Day Christian Records and Platinum Pop Records. It is the second solo project of Peter Furler.

== Background ==
The band started in January 2012 by former Newsboys frontman Peter Furler joining with Dave Ghazarian formerly of Audio Adrenaline and Superchick, Jeff Irizarry, and Phil Joel formerly of the Newsboys. Joel left, however, shortly after its formation. The band released its debut studio album, Sun and Shield, on March 11, 2014, through their own, independent label, New Day Christian Records and Platinum Pop Records. The album charted on Billboard Christian Albums and Independent Albums charts.

== Discography ==
=== Studio albums ===
List of studio albums, with selected chart positions
Title	Album details	Peak chart positions	
Title	Album details	US CHR	US INDIE
Sun and Shield	Released: March 11, 2014; Label: New Day/Platinum Pop; CD, digital download	23	37
