= Crack the Sky (Mylon LeFevre and Broken Heart album) =

Studio album by Mylon LeFevre
- Released: May 26, 1987
- Recorded: 1987
- Studio: Ardent Studios (Memphis, Tennessee)
- Genre: Rock; Pop
- Length: 36:06
- Label: Myrrh
- Producer: Mylon LeFevre; Joe Hardy

Mylon LeFevre chronology
Look Up! (1986)	Crack the Sky (1987)	Face the Music (1988)

Crack the Sky is the fifth studio album by the Christian rock band Mylon LeFevre and Broken Heart, released in 1987 under the Myrrh Records label. The album showcases the band's commitment to blending rock and contemporary Christian music, solidifying their influence in the genre during the late 1980s.

== Track listing ==
The album features a collection of tracks that blend rock rhythms with spiritual themes. All songs were written by Mylon LeFevre, Scott Allen, Kenneth Bentley, Paul Joseph, and Joe Hardy, except where noted.

Original album release: side one
No.	Title	Writer(s)	Length
1.	"Crack the Sky"		4:00
2.	"Love God, Hate Sin"		3:35
3.	"Closer than a Heartbeat"		3:41
4.	"Give It Up"		3:01
5.	"I Belong"	Don Peris, Karen Peris	3:47

Original album release: side two
No.	Title	Length
1.	"Let Me Be the One"	3:45
2.	"Reach for the Sky"	5:47
3.	"Heart on Fire"	3:11
4.	"For My Growing" (duet with Carole Ford)	4:42

== Personnel ==
Mylon LeFevre & Broken Heart

- Mylon LeFevre – vocals, guitars
- Paul Joseph – synthesizers, vocals
- Scott Allen – guitars, vocals
- Trent Argante – guitars, vocals
- Kenneth Bentley – bass, vocals, lead vocal (4)
- Ben Hewitt – digital drums, percussion

Additional Musicians

- Joe Hardy – Emulator programming, Fairlight programming
- Carole Ford – vocals (9)

Production Team

- Mylon LeFevre – producer
- Joe Hardy – producer, engineer, mixing
- Masterdisk (Nashville, Tennessee) – mastering location
- Loren Balman – art direction
- Jackson Design – cover design
- Jimmy Collins – cover photography
