= Seeds of Change (album) =

Studio album by Kerry Livgren
- Released: July 1980
- Recorded: February – March 1980
- Studios: Axis Studios, Atlanta, Georgia
- Genres: Progressive rock, Christian rock
- Length: 42:26
- Label: Kirshner/CBS
- Producers: Kerry Livgren, Brad Aaron

Kerry Livgren chronology
Seeds of Change (1980)	Time Line (1984)

Singles from Seeds of Change
- 1. "Mask of the Great Deceiver" / "To Live for the King" Released: 1980

Professional ratings
Review scores
Source	Rating
AllMusic	3/5 stars

Seeds of Change is Kerry Livgren's first solo album. Released in 1980 while he still was a member of Kansas, it features guest appearances by three fellow Kansas members: Steve Walsh, Phil Ehart and Robby Steinhardt. Singer Ronnie James Dio and members of LeRoux, Jethro Tull, Ambrosia, and Atlanta Rhythm Section are also featured. In 1996, Seeds of Change was reissued by Renaissance Records with an interview with Livgren as a bonus track.

== Background ==
Seeds of Change marked a new chapter in Kerry Livgren's music, recorded after his conversion to Christianity in 1979. His religious beliefs were reflected in lyrics on the Kansas album Vinyl Confessions as well as Seeds of Change. This eventually would cause tension within the band.

The inclusion of Ronnie James Dio, who was Black Sabbath's lead vocalist at the time, caused controversy, as Black Sabbath is considered satanic by some Christians.

== Track listing ==
All songs written by Kerry Livgren

Side one

1. "Just One Way" – 5:45
2. "Mask of the Great Deceiver" – 7:34
3. "How Can You Live" – 4:12
4. "Whiskey Seed" – 5:33

Side two

1. "To Live for the King" – 4:55
2. "Down to the Core" – 5:18
3. "Ground Zero" – 8:33

== Personnel ==
"Just One Way" (track 1);

Drums - Barriemore Barlow
Bass - Paul Goddard
Trumpets and percussion - Bobby Campo
Lead vocals - Jeff Pollard
Background vocals - Jeff Pollard, Mylon LeFevre, John Fristoe
guitars, piano, synthesizers - Kerry Livgren

"Mask of the Great Deceiver" (track 2);

Drums - Barriemore Barlow
Bass - Paul Goddard
vocals - Ronnie James Dio
Guitars, synthesizers - Kerry Livgren

"How Can You Live?" (track 3);

Drums - Barriemore Barlow
Tambourine - Bobby Campo
Background vocals - John Fristoe, Joey Jelf, Mylon LeFevre
Lead vocals - Steve Walsh
Bass, guitars, piano, organ, synthesizers - Kerry Livgren

"Whiskey Seed" (track 4);

Drums - Phil Ehart
Bass - Paul Goddard
Vocals - Kerry Livgren, Mylon LeFevre
Harmonica - Darryl Kutz
Background vocals - "The Moaning Multitudes"
Guitars, mongo drums - Kerry Livgren

"To Live For the King" (track 5);

Drums - John Thompson
Bass - Gary Gilbert
Lead vocals - Ronnie James Dio
Background vocals - Joey Jelf, Steve Walsh, Donna Williams
Guitars - Kerry Livgren

"Down to the Core" (track 6);

Drums - Barriemore Barlow
Lead vocals - Davy Moire
Background vocals - Victoria Livgren
Horns - Bobby Campo
Bass, guitars, clavinet, Fender Rhodes - Kerry Livgren

"Ground Zero" (track 7);

Drums - Phil Ehart
Lead vocals - David Pack
Background vocals - Donna Williams, Brad Aaron, Mylon LeFevre, Davy Moire, Steve Venezia
Violins - Robby Steinhardt
Gong - John Thompson
Piano, guitars, synthesizers, percussion - Kerry Livgren
