= Mylon LeFevre =

American Christian rock singer (1944–2023)

- LeFevre, circa early 1970s

Background information
- Also known as: Mylon & Broken Heart
- Born: Mylon Rae LeFevre; October 6, 1944; Gulfport, Mississippi, U.S.
- Died: September 8, 2023 (aged 78) Newark, Texas, U.S.
- Genres: Southern gospel; rock and roll; Southern rock; Christian rock; contemporary Christian
- Instruments: Vocals, guitar
- Years active: 1966–2023
- Labels: Star Song; Word; Cotillion; Columbia; Warner; Mercury
- Formerly of: The LeFevres; Stamps Quartet; Alvin Lee; White Heart
- Website: mylon.org

Mylon Rae LeFevre (October 6, 1944 – September 8, 2023) was an American Christian rock singer known for his work with his band Mylon and Broken Heart. He was inducted into the Gospel Music Hall of Fame and traveled around the United States, ministering, teaching, and singing. He occasionally appeared on television networks such as TBN, Daystar, and Victory Channel.

== Biography ==
=== Early years ===
Born on October 6, 1944, in Gulfport, Mississippi, into the pioneering Southern gospel family, The LeFevres, Mylon was the youngest son of Eva Mae and Urias LeFevre. When he was old enough, he began to sing and play guitar with the group.

As a teen, LeFevre was expelled from a private religious high school when his father took him out of school to perform with the family at a local concert. When he was 17 years, he wrote his first song, "Without Him". While stationed at Fort Jackson, South Carolina in the U.S. Army, where he was paid $84 per month, the LeFevres performed at the National Quartet Convention in Memphis. That weekend, LeFevre hitchhiked over 600 miles to get there. Onstage, singing "Without Him", he did not know that Elvis Presley was there. After the concert, Presley asked to meet LeFevre. Presley eventually recorded the song for his album, How Great Thou Art; within the next year, over a hundred artists would record LeFevre's song. According to LeFevre, writing the song took about twenty minutes and produced an initial royalty check of approximately $90,000. With the money, he purchased his first car, a Chevrolet Corvette, one of many sports cars he later owned.

After being discharged from the Army, LeFevre became a member of the Stamps Quartet (1966–1968). In 1964, LeFevre released his first solo album, New Found Joy, on Skylite Records. In 1968, he released Your Only Tomorrow.

LeFevre wanted to write and sing contemporary music which gives glory to God, but there seemed to be no place for his music—or his longer hair and long sideburns—in his family or the church. His first mainstream album, titled Mylon (We Believe) (Cotillion Records, 1970), is considered by some to be the first true "Jesus Rock" album, although Larry Norman's Upon This Rock preceded that album by about a year. LeFevre took the classic song, "Old Gospel Ship", setting the familiar southern gospel melody to a rock and roll tempo.

=== 1970s–early 1980s ===
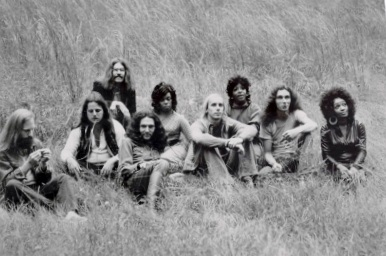
Mylon LeFevre and the Holy Smoke Doo Dah Band

In 1970, LeFevre signed with Columbia Records and formed the Holy Smoke Doo Dah Band with Auburn Burrell and J.P. Lauzon on guitar, drummer Marty Simon, Tom Robb on bass, and keyboardist Lester Langdale. From 1970 through 1980, he recorded and performed with Eric Clapton, Elton John, Billy Joel, Duane Allman, Berry Oakley, Little Richard, and the Who among others. The album On the Road to Freedom was produced by Alvin Lee and recorded in George Harrison's studio with Ron Wood, Steve Winwood, Jim Capaldi, and Mick Fleetwood, and released in 1973. Lee & Harrison are also contributing writers/musicians. In 1974, LeFevre appeared as a fill-in vocalist on several tracks for the Atlanta Rhythm Section's album Third Annual Pipe Dream.

LeFevre began getting high to deal with the stress and to fit in. His drug use escalated to a near-fatal overdose of heroin in 1973. So LeFevre committed himself to a drug treatment program that year. Seven months later, he left clean.

In 1976 LeFevre met Danny Davenport, a promotion exec with Warner Bros. and the two of them became friends. The friendship escalated into a Warner Bros. contract which yielded two albums: Weak at the Knees and Love Rustler. In 1980, LeFevre attended a concert by the CCM (contemporary Christian music) group 2nd Chapter of Acts. Their long hair and music showed that they were not concerned with outward appearances but with issues of the heart. Buck Herring, the group's leader, led the people in prayer and LeFevre prayed along and submitted to Jesus as the Lord of his life.

=== Broken Heart era ===
LeFevre quit secular rock music and returned to his home church at Mt. Paran Church of God, in Atlanta, where he worked as a janitor while attending Bible-study classes. His first challenge was to get out of his music contract which, according to the terms, could only be broken "by an act of God". LeFevre's attorney argued that being born again is an act of God and won the case. In return for being released from his contract, LeFevre agreed to give up all future royalties on his songs, publishing, and recordings.

In 1981, he started a Christian band called The Gathering Ground Band, later renamed Airborn with some musicians he met in the Bible study: Dean Harrington (lead guitar, vocals, percussion), Don Woods (drums/percussion), Kim Klaudt (bass), Mike Adams (rhythm guitar), and Michael Milsap (keyboards). In 1982, the band changed their name to Broken Heart. A small offshoot gospel label from MCA Records known as Songbird released Broken Heart's first album Brand New Start (1982), with Dean Harrington, Kenny Bentley (bass/vocals), Stan Coates (keyboards/vocals), Ben Hewitt (drums/percussion), and Mike Adams as members. Other musicians who helped with the first album were Joe Hardy (bass, guitars, percussion), John Hampton (drums), Ed DeGarmo (of DeGarmo and Key; organ/synthesizer), Jack Holder (guitar/background vocals), Phil Driscoll (trumpet/flugelhorn). Later members of the band included Tim Huffman (guitars/vocals) and Scott Allen (rhythm guitar/vocals).

Other musicians who helped with Mylon and Broken Heart albums over the years were Kerry Livgren (of Kansas), Phil Keaggy, Ed Zimmerman, The 2nd Chapter of Acts, the group Sevenfold, and Jimi Jamison. Two more albums came out in 1983, More and Live Forever (recorded at Six Flags Over Georgia). Over the next decade, the group released 10 albums and traveled over a million miles. In 1986, the group attempted to cross over to mainstream rock by rechristening itself as 'Look Up' and they released an album with that name on CBS Associated. The album contains a retooled update of "Peace Begins Within" from the Mylon (We Believe) album and a cover of DeGarmo and Key's "Love is All You Need". Over the years guitarists Scott Allen, David Payton, Michael Tyrrell, Trent Argante, and Skip Benicky in addition to keyboardists Stan Coates, Paul Joseph, and Marshall Pratt were members. Many members of Broken Heart have become solo artists, music producers, worship leaders, pastors, and teachers.

In 1987, the band received a Rock Album of the Year GMA Dove Award for Crack the Sky. In the same year, they received a Grammy Award for Best Gospel Performance by a Duo, Group, Choir, or Chorus.

About the period (1982–1991), LeFevre said, "I was a Christian musician who preached a little, worshiped a little, and rocked a lot." Then in mid-1989 he suffered a heart attack on a tour bus while touring with White Heart. Doctors advised him to stop touring but against the physician's advice, LeFevre completed his scheduled obligations and finished his concert tours. Mylon and Broken Heart continued touring through 1990 to support Crank It Up. They disbanded after the tour was completed.

=== Solo career ===
In 1992, LeFevre inked a solo recording deal with Star Song Records and began releasing material which was less musically "edgy" than past offerings. His first release for the label, Faith, Hope & Love, included guest appearances from Carman, 4Him, Michael W. Smith, and Steven Curtis Chapman among other popular Christian musicians of the day along with Broken Heart bandmates Bentley, Hardy, and Hewitt.

After his heart attack, LeFevre increasingly turned to preaching and teaching as his vocation. He and his wife Christi ministered in about 75 churches a year. He spoke at motorcycle rallies, NASCAR owner/driver chapel services, NFL and NBA chapel services as well as in Russia, Australia, Canada, the Philippines, the Cayman Islands, and Mexico. In 2003 he released Bow Down, produced by his son-in-law Peter Furler of the Newsboys, a Christian band. The couple's home church was Eagle Mountain International Church in Newark, Texas northwest of Fort Worth.

== Personal life and death ==
LeFevre died of cancer on September 8, 2023, at the age of 78.

== Discography ==
- 1964: New Found Joy
- 1968: Your Only Tomorrow
- 1970: Mylon (We Believe)
- 1971: Holy Smoke
- 1972: Over the Influence
- 1973: On the Road to Freedom (with Alvin Lee)
- 1977: Weak at the Knees
- 1978: Love Rustler
- 1980: Rock & Roll Resurrection
- 1982: Brand New Start
- 1983: More
- 1983: Live Forever
- 1985: Sheep In Wolves Clothing
- 1986: Look Up
- 1987: Crack the Sky
- 1988: Face the Music
- 1989: Big World
- 1990: Crank It Up
- 1992: A Decade of Love
- 1993: Faith, Hope & Love
- 2003: Bow Down

== Awards ==
=== Grammy ===
- 1988: Best Gospel Performance by a Duo or Group, Choir or Chorus for Crack the Sky

=== GMA Dove Awards ===
- 1988: Rock Album of the Year for Crack the Sky
- 1989: Rock Song of the Year for "Won by One"
