= Paul Colman Trio =

Australian contemporary Christian music group

- Also known as: pc3
- Origin: Melbourne, Victoria, Australia
- Genres: Contemporary Christian music
- Years active: 1998–2004, 2009–present
- Label: Essential
- Members: Paul Colman; Phil Gaudion; Grant Norsworthy
- Website: paulcolmantrio.com

Paul Colman Trio (often stylised as pc3) are an Australian contemporary Christian music group formed in 1998, composed of Paul Colman on lead vocals and guitars, Phil Gaudion on drums and vocals, and Grant Norsworthy on bass guitar and vocals. The band released five studio albums and had Christian radio hit singles including "Turn", "The Selfish Song", and "Fill My Cup". Their major-label studio album, New Map of the World (2002), received a Grammy nomination for Best Pop/Contemporary Gospel Album. They disbanded in February 2004 and re-united in April 2009.

== History ==
Paul Colman had started his music career as a solo artist, releasing two albums in the late 1990s. His trio, pc3, was formed in Melbourne in 1998 with Colman joined by Phil Gaudion on drums and vocals, and Grant Norsworthy on bass guitar and vocals. They issued two studio albums and two live albums, before breaking into the United States market with pc3 – Live Acoustic album in 2001. The group relocated to Nashville TN and performed at contemporary Christian music festivals and supported US band Third Day on an 80 city tour as opening band in 2002. Norsworthy described the US scene, "it's bigger than the entire Australian music scene over there in America, and there's amazing infrastructure – radio stations, TV stations, magazines totally dedicated to Christian music."

Paul Colman Trio issued two more studio albums, including New Map of the World in 2002. This received a Grammy nomination for Best Pop/Contemporary Gospel Album. Colman told Mick Bunworth of The 7.30 Report that he wrote lyrics "set against the backdrop of a faith, of the fact that God made the universe." The trio undertook international tours before disbanding in February 2004 as they would be "taking a break as a recording/performing band", citing "financial and family considerations" as primary reasons.

In April 2009 Paul Colman Trio re-formed after a five-year break for a reunion show at Easterfest in Toowoomba. Early in January 2011 pc3 spent time in Nashville and recorded a new album, Return, which was released in April that year. They supported the release with a national tour of Australia.

The band toured Australia again in 2012 and then most recently in July 2023 for a one off “Unrepentant Nostalgia” concert which can be purchased from the band’s website www.paulcolmantrio.com

== Discography ==
- Serious Fun, 1999
- Turn, 2000
- pc3 – Live Acoustic, 2001
- pc3 – Live Electric, 2001
- pc3 – Live (USA version), 2001
- New Map of the World, 2002
- One, 2003 (two different versions exist—11 song and 12 song—The 11 song is a New Zealand / Australian edit that includes the songs "Your Love" and "Love this Life" but removes "Pray", "Live it!" and "Save my Soul".)
- Return, 2011

Awards
Preceded by ZOEgirl	GMA's New Artist of the Year; 2003	Succeeded by Jeremy Camp
