= Warren Ham =

American musician (born 1952)

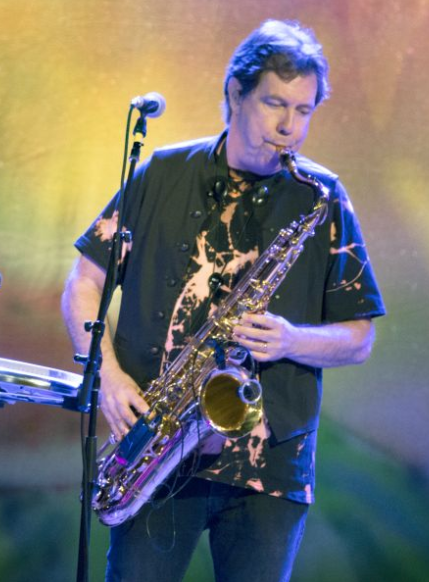
- Ham performing with Ringo Starr in 2018

Background information
- Born: Warren Lee Ham; October 26, 1952 (age 73)
- Origin: Fort Worth, Texas, U.S.
- Genres: Pop; rock; CCM
- Occupations: Musician; singer
- Instruments: Vocals; saxophone; flute; harmonica; keyboards; percussion; trumpet
- Member of: Toto; Ringo Starr & His All-Starr Band
- Formerly of: Bloodrock; Black Rose; Kansas; AD; The Four Seasons
- Spouse: Avah Derderian

Warren Lee Ham (born October 26, 1952) is an American saxophonist, singer, and multi-instrumentalist. He is best known for playing with Kansas (1982), Toto (1986–1988, and since 2017) and Ringo Starr & His All-Starr Band (since 2014).

== Career ==
During the early '70s, Ham and his brother Bill formed The Ham Brothers Band and included Ira Wilkes on bass, Red Young on piano and organ and Dahrell Norris on drums. The group recorded for Texas producer Huey P. Meaux. Despite critical acclaim for the work, the album never made it in the marketplace. It was soon taken out of print. In 1978, The Ham Brothers band had replaced Wilkes and Young with Bob Parr and Ken Rarrick, both from the acclaimed jazz education program at the University of North Texas. Later that same year, David Gates, of Bread fame, hired the Ham Brothers to tour as part of Bread. The act was then billed as David Gates and Bread. A year later, pop diva Cher secured the services of the same band. When Cher recorded the project album Black Rose, Ham joined the band for the recording and the subsequent supporting tour.

In his early years, Ham was a vocalist and played the reeds for the Fort Worth, Texas based Bloodrock (1972–74). Ham appeared on the last two Bloodrock albums: Passage and Whirlwind Tongues.

In 1982, Ham auditioned to replace Steve Walsh as lead singer of Kansas, but was beaten out by John Elefante. Instead, the band hired Ham to tour with them, contributing saxophones, flute, harmonica, additional keyboards, and backing vocals. When Kerry Livgren left Kansas in 1984 to form his own Christian rock band AD, Ham went with him as the new band's lead singer. He appeared on three of the band's four albums, and toured with them. Since the demise of AD, he has released solo recordings in the contemporary Christian music genre, first in 2000 with Come On Children. In between Kansas and AD, Ham toured with Donna Summer on her 1983 tour.

In 1986, Ham joined Toto, touring with them from 1986 to 1988 and from 2017 on. From late 1988 to 1989 when Toto was on a hiatus, Ham toured with Toto guitarist Steve Lukather's solo band. They first performed in local clubs in November 1988 and then embarked on a Japanese tour in August 1989, opening for Bad English, Chuck Berry, and Jeff Beck. He provided saxophones, harmonica, backing vocals, and occasional lead vocals with both Toto and Lukather.

In 1989, Ham toured with Amy Grant, contributing saxophones, flute, and backing vocals.

From 1993 to 1996, he was a featured vocalist and instrumentalist for the Maranatha! Promise Band – the worship band for the Promise Keepers men's movement put together by Maranatha! Music. He appeared on their 1993 album, Face to Face with the song "This Is What I Believe", and on their 1996 album, Break Down the Walls, on the song "Send Me" along with Steven Jackson and Leonard Tucker. He was also a part of the live touring version of the Promise Band for the 1995 Promise Keepers conference season where he played harmonica, saxophone, trumpet, flute, and other wind instruments along with backing vocals. This was documented in the VHS video and CD "Live Worship with the Maranatha! Promise Band" where he most famously played an intro to "Man of the Spirit, Man of the Word".

From 1996 to 2000, Ham toured as part of Frankie Valli and The Four Seasons.

In 2000, he authored the book Beginning Blues/Rock Harmonica (ISBN 0-8256-1154-7).

Ham toured with Olivia Newton-John in 2006 as an instrumentalist and vocalist, notably performing John Travolta's part with Newton-John on her No. 1 Grease hit, "You're the One That I Want".

Ham also appeared once again as a member of Donna Summer's live band on her 2008 tour supporting her album Crayons. Ham has toured with Ringo Starr and His All-Starr Band in all tours since 2014.
