= The Essential Michael Bolton =

2005 album by Michael Bolton

Compilation album by Michael Bolton
- Released: April 25, 2005
- Genre: Pop rock
- Length: 2:22:51
- Labels: Columbia; Legacy; Sony

Michael Bolton chronology
To Love Somebody – The Best of Michael Bolton (2005)	The Essential Michael Bolton (2005)	The Very Best of Michael Bolton (2005)

Professional ratings
Review scores
Source	Rating
AllMusic	4/5 stars

The Essential Michael Bolton is a two-disc compilation album by American singer Michael Bolton, released on April 25, 2005. It is a repacked version of Michael Bolton's 2002 album The Ultimate Collection. In 2005, a DVD was released with the album containing all 32 music videos. The album only charted in Denmark. In 2009, Columbia released a 3.0 edition of The Essential Michael Bolton containing eight bonus tracks.

== Track listing ==
=== Disc one ===
No.	Title	Writer(s)	Originally from	Length
1.	"Soul Provider"	Michael Bolton, Andrew Goldmark	Soul Provider (1989)	4:28
2.	"(Sittin' On) The Dock of the Bay"	Otis Redding, Steve Cropper	The Hunger (1987)	3:52
3.	"How Am I Supposed to Live Without You"	Michael Bolton, Doug James	Soul Provider (1989)	4:15
4.	"How Can We Be Lovers?"	Michael Bolton, Diane Warren, Desmond Child	Soul Provider (1989)	3:54
5.	"When I'm Back on My Feet Again"	Diane Warren	Soul Provider (1989)	3:47
6.	"Georgia on My Mind"	Hoagy Carmichael, Stuart Gorrell	Soul Provider (1989)	4:57
7.	"Time, Love and Tenderness"	Diane Warren	Time, Love & Tenderness (1991)	4:17
8.	"When a Man Loves a Woman"	Calvin Lewis, Andrew Wright	Time, Love & Tenderness (1991)	3:50
9.	"Missing You Now" (featuring Kenny G)	Michael Bolton, Diane Warren, Walter Afanasieff	Time, Love & Tenderness (1991)	4:32
10.	"Steel Bars"	Michael Bolton, Bob Dylan, Bob Halligan Jr.	Time, Love & Tenderness (1991)	3:25
11.	"Said I Loved You...But I Lied"	Michael Bolton, Robert John "Mutt" Lange	The One Thing (1993)	5:01
12.	"Lean on Me"	Bill Withers	The One Thing (1993)	5:17
13.	"Can I Touch You...There?"	Michael Bolton, Robert John "Mutt" Lange	Greatest Hits (1985–1995) (1995)	5:15
14.	"Love Is the Power"	Michael Bolton, Diane Warren, Walter Afanasieff	This Is The Time: The Christmas Album (1996)	5:33
15.	"Soul Of My Soul"	Michael Bolton, Diane Warren, Walter Afanasieff	The One Thing (1993)	5:41
16.	"A Whiter Shade of Pale"	Gary Brooker, Keith Reid, Matthew Fisher	Timeless: The Classics Vol. 2 (1999)	4:42
Total length:				1:12:57

=== Disc two ===
No.	Title	Writer(s)	Originally from	Length
1.	"I Promise You"	Michael Bolton, Robert John "Mutt" Lange	Greatest Hits (1985–1995) (1995)	5:17
2.	"I Found Someone"	Michael Bolton, Mark Mangold	Greatest Hits (1985–1995) (1995)	3:47
3.	"A Love So Beautiful"	Roy Orbison, Jeff Lynne	Greatest Hits (1985–1995) (1995)	4:05
4.	"Ain't Got Nothing If You Ain't Got Love"	Michael Bolton, Robert John "Mutt" Lange	The One Thing (1993)	5:03
5.	"Drift Away"	Mentor Williams	Timeless: The Classics (1992)	6:05
6.	"Reach Out I'll Be There" (featuring The Four Tops)	Lamont Dozier, Brian Holland, Eddie Holland	Timeless: The Classics (1992)	3:48
7.	"The Best of Love"	Michael Bolton, Babyface	All That Matters (1997)	4:15
8.	"Go the Distance"	Alan Menken, David Zippel	All That Matters (1997) / Hercules: An Original Walt Disney Records Soundtrack (1997)	4:42
9.	"Sexual Healing"	Marvin Gaye, Odell Brown, David Ritz	Timeless: The Classics Vol. 2 (1999)	4:35
10.	"Ain't No Sunshine"	Bill Withers	Timeless: The Classics Vol. 2 (1999)	3:34
11.	"Nessun Dorma! From Turandot"	Giacomo Puccini	My Secret Passion: The Arias (1998)	3:13
12.	"Once In a Lifetime"	Michael Bolton, Diane Warren, Walter Afanasieff	Only You (1994)	5:53
13.	"A Dream Is a Wish Your Heart Makes"	Mack David, Al Hoffman, Jerry Livingston	Non-Album Single (1991)	3:13
14.	"To Love Somebody"	Barry Gibb, Robin Gibb	Timeless: The Classics (1992)	4:06
15.	"Now That I Found You"	Michael Bolton, Diane Warren	Time, Love & Tenderness (1991)	4:32
16.	"That's What Love Is All About"	Michael Bolton, Eric Kaz	The Hunger (1987)	3:57
Total length:				1:10:13

== Charts ==
Weekly chart performance for The Essential Michael Bolton
Chart (2005)	Peak position
Danish Albums (Hitlisten)	18

Chart (2025)	Peak position
Greek Albums (IFPI)	52

== Certifications ==
Certifications for The Essential Michael Bolton
Region	Certification	Certified units/sales
United Kingdom (BPI)	Silver	60,000^{‡}
^{‡} Sales+streaming figures based on certification alone.

== Release history ==
Region	Date	Label	Format	Catalogue
Europe	2002	Columbia Records	CD	513975 2
South Africa	2002	Columbia Records	CD	CDCOL 6723
United States	2002	Columbia Records	CD	88697 42575 2
