= List of awards and nominations received by Michael Bolton =

Michael Bolton awards and nominations
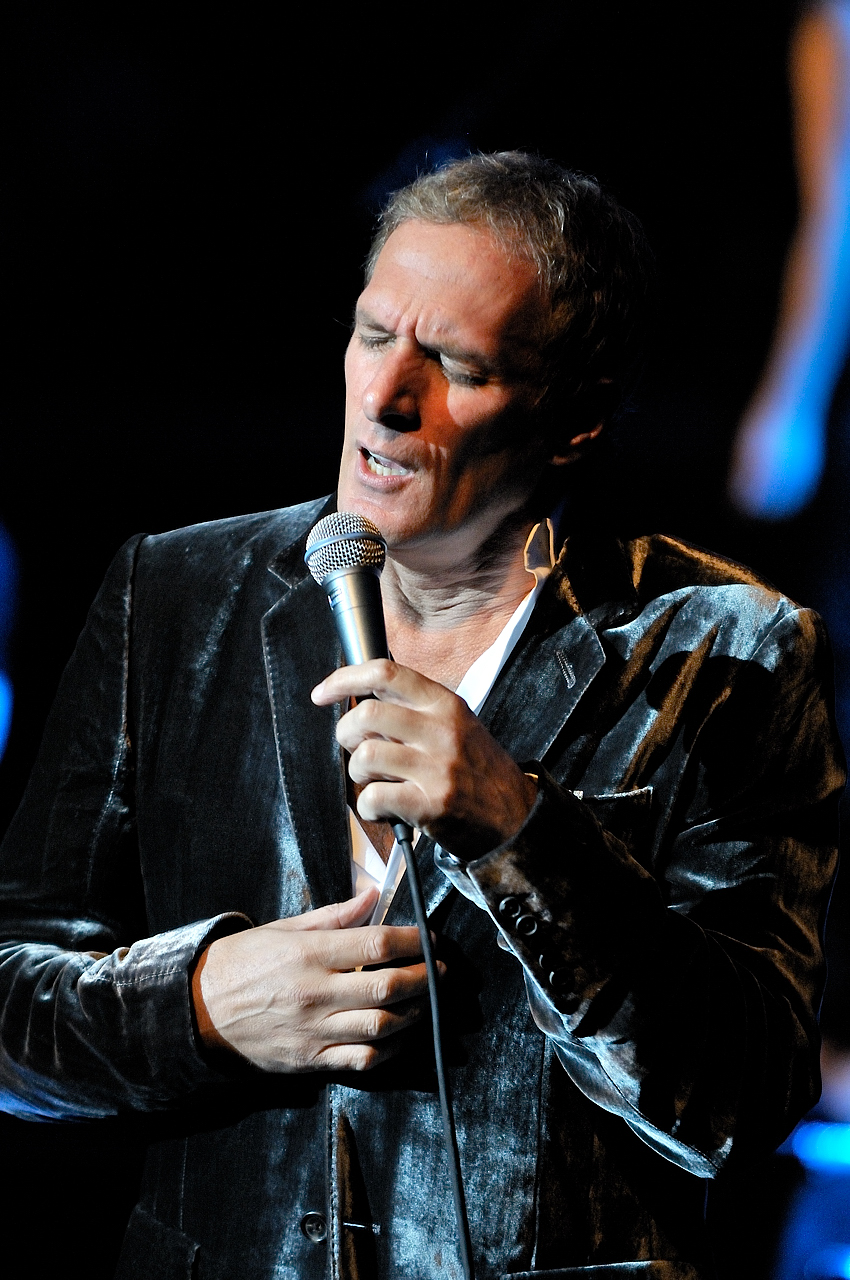
- Bolton in Barcelona, Spain, January 2010
Awards and nominations
Award	Wins	Nominations
American Music Awards	6	10
Grammy	2	4
BMI Awards	1	1
Primetime Emmy Awards	0	2

Totals (Note: Certain award groups do not simply award one winner. They acknowledge several different recipients, have runners-up, and have third place. Since this is a specific recognition and is different from losing an award, runner-up mentions are considered wins in this award tally. For simplification and to avoid errors, each award in this list has been presumed to have had a prior nomination.)
- Wins: 17
- Nominations: 27

This is a comprehensive list of awards and nominations received by American singer/songwriter Michael Bolton.

== ASCAP Pop Music Awards ==
Year	Nominee / work	Award	Result	Ref.
1989	"That's What Love Is All About"	Most Performed Songs	Won	
1991	"How Am I Supposed to Live Without You"	Most Performed Songs	Won	
1991	"How Can We Be Lovers?"	Most Performed Songs	Won	
1991	"Soul Provider"	Most Performed Songs	Won	

== American Music Awards ==
The American Music Awards is an annual awards ceremony created by Dick Clark in 1973. Bolton has won 6 awards from 10 nominations.

Year	Nominee/work	Award	Result
1991	Michael Bolton	Favorite Pop/Rock Male Artist	Nominated
1992	Michael Bolton	Favorite Pop/Rock Male Artist	Won
1992	Time, Love & Tenderness	Favorite Pop/Rock Album	Won
1993	Michael Bolton	Favorite Adult Contemporary Artist	Won
1993	Michael Bolton	Favorite Pop/Rock Male Artist	Won
1994	Michael Bolton	Favorite Adult Contemporary Artist	Nominated
1994	Michael Bolton	Favorite Pop/Rock Male Artist	Nominated
1995	Michael Bolton	Favorite Adult Contemporary Artist	Won
1995	Michael Bolton	Favorite Pop/Rock Male Artist	Won
1998	Michael Bolton	Favorite Adult Contemporary Artist	Nominated

== BMI Awards ==
Year	Nominee/work	Award	Result	Ref.
1993	Time, Love & Tenderness	Songwriter of the Year	Won	
1993	"Love is a Wonderful Thing"	Award-Winning Songs	Won	
1993	"Missing You Now"	Award-Winning Songs	Won	
1993	"Steel Bars"	Award-Winning Songs	Won	
1993	"How Can We Be Lovers?"	1 Million Award	Won	
1993	"Love is a Wonderful Thing"	1 Million Award	Won	
1993	"Soul Provider"	1 Million Award	Won	
1996	"Ain't Got Nothing If You Ain't Got Love"	Award-Winning Songs	Won	
1996	"Once in a Lifetime"	Award-Winning Songs	Won	

== Grammy Awards ==
The Grammy Awards are held annually by the National Academy of Recording Arts and Sciences. Bolton has won 2 awards from 4 nominations.

Year	Nominee/work	Award	Result
1990	How Am I Supposed to Live Without You	Best Male Pop Vocal Performance	Won
1991	Georgia on My Mind	Best Male Pop Vocal Performance	Nominated
1992	When a Man Loves a Woman	Best Male Pop Vocal Performance	Won
1995	Said I Loved You...But I Lied	Best Male Pop Vocal Performance	Nominated

== Juno Awards ==
Juno Awards are presented annually to Canadian musical artists and bands to acknowledge their artistic and technical achievements in all aspects of music. Winners are currently chosen by members of the Canadian Academy of Recording Arts and Sciences or, depending on the award, a panel of experts.

Year	Nominee/work	Award	Result
1992	Time, Love & Tenderness	Best Selling Album by a Foreign Artist	Nominated
1992	Michael Bolton	Foreign Entertainer of the Year	Nominated

== National Child Labor Committee ==
Year	Nominee/work	Award	Result
1994	Michael Bolton	Lewis Hine Award for Foreign Entertainer of the Year	Won

== Primetime Emmy Awards ==
Year	Nominee/work	Award	Result
2005	Terror at Home: Domestic Violence in America	Outstanding Original Music and Lyrics; For the song:"The Tears of the Angels"	Nominated
2017	Honest Trailers	Outstanding Short Form Variety Series	Nominated

== Pollstar Concert Industry Awards ==
Year	Nominee / work	Award	Result	Ref.
1991	Tour	Most Creative Tour Package	Won	

== Songwriters Hall of Fame ==
Year	Nominee/work	Award	Result
1995	Michael Bolton	Howie Richmond Hitmaker Award	Won

== Virgin Media Music Awards ==
Year	Nominee/work	Award	Result	Ref.
2011	"Jack Sparrow (with The Lonely Island)	Best Video	Nominated	
2011	"Jack Sparrow (with The Lonely Island)	Best Collaboration	Nominated	
