= Greatest Hits (1985–1995) =

Compilation album by Michael Bolton
- Released: September 19, 1995
- Studio: Passion Studios (Westport, Connecticut); The Hit Factory, Sony Music Studios and Right Track Recording (New York City, New York); WallyWorld Studios (San Rafael, California); Record Plant (Los Angeles, California); Cherokee Studios (Hollywood, California); The Dugout (Nashville, Tennessee)
- Genre: AOR; pop rock; soft rock; adult contemporary
- Length: 74:12
- Label: Columbia
- Producer: Keith Diamond; Jonathan Cain; Peter Bunetta; Rick Chudacoff; Michael Bolton; Guy Roche; Susan Hamilton; Michael Omartian; Desmond Child; Walter Afanasieff; Robert John "Mutt" Lange; Tommy Sims

Michael Bolton chronology
The One Thing (1993)	Greatest Hits (1985–1995) (1995)	This Is The Time: The Christmas Album (1996)

Greatest Hits (1985–1995) is a compilation album by American singer Michael Bolton, released in 1995. The album features Bolton's biggest hit singles from his four previous albums: The Hunger, Soul Provider, Time, Love & Tenderness and The One Thing, plus five new recordings. The album achieved a great deal of success, going 3× platinum in the US.

Professional ratings
Review scores
Source	Rating
AllMusic	AMG link

== Track listing ==
No.	Title	Writer(s)	Album	Length
1.	"That's What Love Is All About"	Michael Bolton, Eric Kaz	The Hunger, 1987	3:57
2.	"(Sittin' On) The Dock of the Bay"	Steve Cropper, Otis Redding	The Hunger	3:52
3.	"Soul Provider"	Bolton, Andy Goldmark	Soul Provider, 1989	4:26
4.	"How Am I Supposed to Live Without You"	Bolton, Doug James	Soul Provider	4:15
5.	"How Can We Be Lovers?"	Bolton, Desmond Child, Diane Warren	Soul Provider	3:56
6.	"When I'm Back on My Feet Again"	Warren	Soul Provider	3:49
7.	"Georgia on My Mind"	Hoagy Carmichael, Stuart Gorrell	Soul Provider	4:57
8.	"Time, Love and Tenderness"	Warren	Time, Love & Tenderness, 1991	4:18
9.	"When a Man Loves a Woman"	Calvin Lewis, Andrew Wright	Time, Love & Tenderness	3:51
10.	"Missing You Now"	Walter Afanasieff, Bolton, Warren	Time, Love & Tenderness	4:25
11.	"Steel Bars"	Bolton, Bob Dylan	Time, Love & Tenderness	4:25
12.	"Said I Loved You...But I Lied"	Bolton, Robert John "Mutt" Lange	The One Thing, 1993	5:01
13.	"Can I Touch You...There?"	Bolton, Lange		5:17
14.	"I Promise You"	Bolton, Lange		5:21
15.	"I Found Someone"	Bolton, Mark Mangold		3:53
16.	"A Love So Beautiful"	Roy Orbison, Jeff Lynne		4:07
17.	"This River"	Warren		5:17

== Personnel ==
=== Tracks 13–17 ===
- Michael Bolton – vocals, arrangements (15, 16)
- Tommy Sims – keyboards (13, 17), programming (13, 17), guitars (13, 17), bass (17), drum programming (17), arrangements (17)
- Jan Mullaney – additional keyboards (13)
- Danny Duncan – programming assistant (13, 14), keyboard programming (17)
- Walter Afanasieff – keyboards (15, 16), Hammond B3 organ (15), synth bass (15, 16), drum and rhythm programming (15, 16), arrangements (15, 16)
- Gary Cirimelli – Macintosh programming (15, 16), digital and synthesizer programming (15, 16)
- Dann Huff – guitars (14–17), guitar solo (17)
- Chris McHugh – drums (17)
- Brenda Braxton – backing vocals (13)
- Victor Trent Cook – backing vocals (13)
- Pattie Darcy Jones – backing vocals (13)
- Mutt Lange – backing vocals (13, 14)
- Larry Batiste – backing vocals (15)
- Portia Griffin – backing vocals (15)
- Pat Hawk – backing vocals (15)
- Vann Johnson – backing vocals (15)
- Janis Liebhart – backing vocals (15)
- Claytoven Richardson – backing vocals (15)
- Alex Brown – backing vocals (16)
- Jim Gilstrap – backing vocals (16)
- Phillip Ingram – backing vocals (16)
- Rose Stone – backing vocals (16)
- Bob Carlisle – backing vocals (17)
- Kim Fleming – backing vocals (17)
- Vicki Hampton – backing vocals (17)
- Angelo Petrucci – backing vocals (17)
- Veronica Petrucci – backing vocals (17)
- Chris Rodriguez – backing vocals (17)
- Micah Wilshire – backing vocals (17)

Choir on "This River"

- Lisa Bevill
- Michael Black
- Lisa Cochran
- Tabitha Fair
- Chris Harris
- Robert White Johnson
- Robin Johnson
- Lisa Keith
- Kim Keyes
- Michael Mellett
- Cindy Morgan
- Nicol Smith

== Production ==
- Jan Mullaney – A&R for Passion Music
- Keith Diamond – producer (1)
- Jonathan Cain – producer (2)
- Peter Bunetta – producer (3)
- Rick Chudacoff – producer (3)
- Michael Omartian – producer (4)
- Desmond Child – producer (5)
- Michael Bolton – producer (6–12, 15–17)
- Guy Roche – producer (6)
- Susan Hamilton – producer (7)
- Walter Afanasieff – producer (8–11, 15, 16)
- Mutt Lange – producer (12–14)
- Tommy Sims – producer (17)
- Bridget Evans O'Lannerghty – production coordinator (17)
- Vlado Meller – remastering at Sony Music Studio Operations (New York City, New York)
- Christopher Austopchuk – art direction
- Timothy White – cover photography
- Louis Levin – direction
- Gemina Aboitiz – stylist
- Lee Hawkins – styling assistant
- Nancy Sprague – hair, make-up
- Steve Milo – personal assistant

=== Tracks 13–17 ===
- Steve Milo – engineer (13, 14), digital editing (13, 14), second engineer (15–17)
- Jan Mullaney – engineer (13, 14, 17), additional engineer (15), additional vocal engineer (16)
- Mike Shipley – mixing (13, 14, 17)
- Dana Jon Chappelle – engineer (15, 16)
- Mick Guzauski – mixing (15, 16)
- David Gleeson – engineer (16)
- Carl Nappa – second engineer (13)
- Glen Marchese – assistant engineer (13, 14)
- Brandon Harris – second engineer (15)
- Craig Silvey – second engineer (15, 16)
- Jen Monnar – second engineer (16)
- Larry Schalit – second engineer (16)
- Brian Vibberts – second engineer (16)
- Steve Bishir – second engineer (17), additional engineer (17)
- Martin Woodlee – second engineer (17)
- Jason Goldstein – assistant engineer (17)
- Danny Duncan – technical assistant (17)

== Charts and certifications ==
=== Weekly charts ===
Chart (1995–96)	Peak position
Australian Albums (ARIA)	6
Austrian Albums (Ö3 Austria)	13
Belgian Albums (Ultratop Flanders)	45
Belgian Albums (Ultratop Wallonia)	32
Dutch Albums (Album Top 100)	26
Finnish Albums (Suomen virallinen lista)	17
German Albums (Offizielle Top 100)	8
Hungarian Albums (MAHASZ)	22
Italian Albums (FIMI)	1
Japanese Albums (Oricon)	28
New Zealand Albums (RMNZ)	8
Norwegian Albums (VG-lista)	6
Swedish Albums (Sverigetopplistan)	13
Swiss Albums (Schweizer Hitparade)	16
UK Albums (Official Charts)	2
US Billboard 200	5

=== Year-end charts ===
Chart (1995)	Position
Australian Albums (ARIA)	20
German Albums (Offizielle Top 100)	93
UK Albums (OCC)	29
US Billboard 200	103

Chart (1996)	Position
Australian Albums (ARIA)	30
UK Albums (OCC)	97
US Billboard 200	65

== Certifications ==
Region	Certification	Certified units/sales
Australia (ARIA)	2× Platinum	140,000^{^}
Canada (Music Canada)	3× Platinum	300,000^{^}
France (SNEP)	Gold	100,000^{*}
Italy (FIMI)	3× Platinum	300,000^{*}
Japan (RIAJ)	Gold	100,000^{^}
New Zealand (RMNZ)	Platinum	15,000^{^}
Norway (IFPI Norway)	Gold	25,000^{*}
Spain (Promusicae)	Platinum	100,000^{^}
Switzerland (IFPI Switzerland)	Gold	25,000^{^}
United Kingdom (BPI)	Platinum	300,000^{^}
United States (RIAA)	3× Platinum	3,000,000^{^}
Summaries
Europe (IFPI)	Platinum	1,000,000^{*}
^{*} Sales figures based on certification alone.^{^} Shipments figures based on certification alone.
