= List of Hot Adult Contemporary number ones of 1991 =

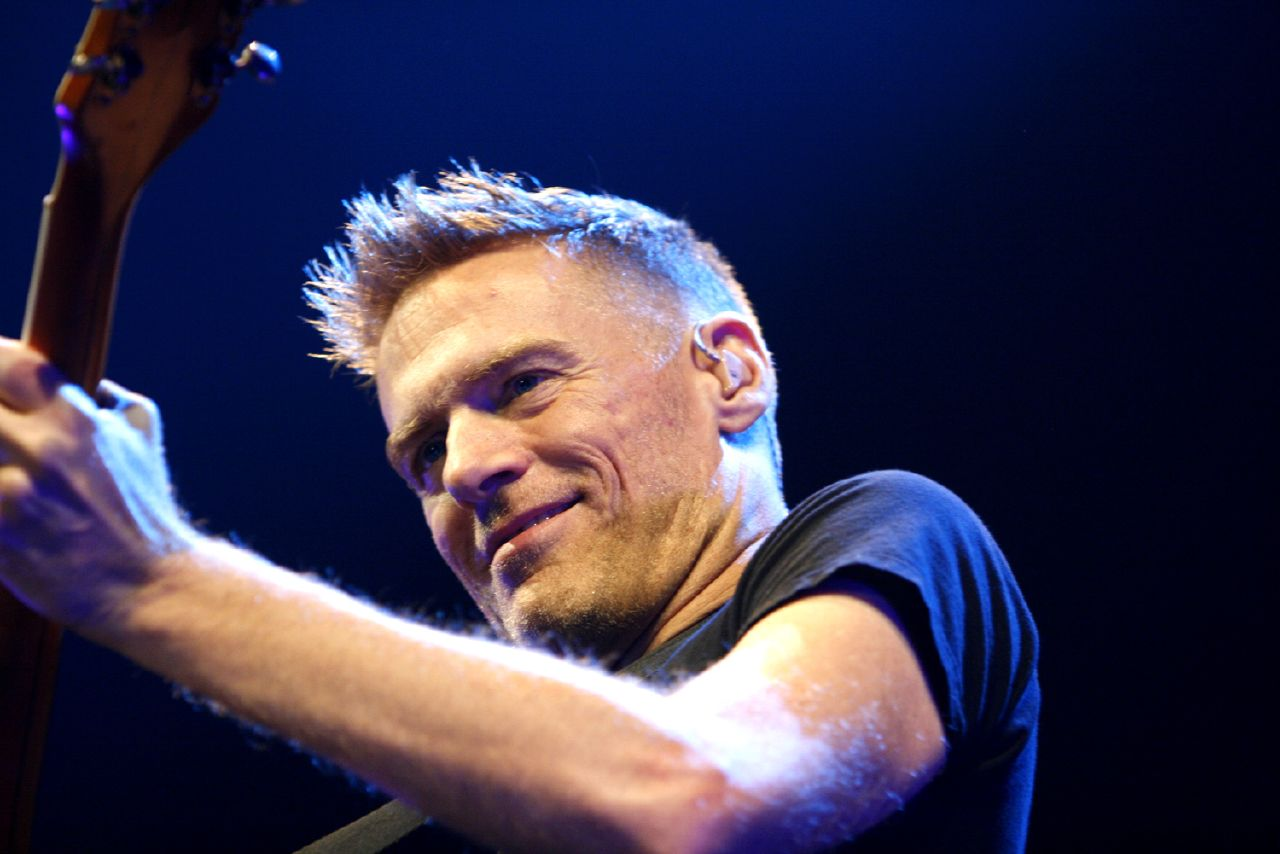
Bryan Adams had the longest-running number one of the year with "(Everything I Do) I Do It for You".

In 1991, Billboard magazine published a chart ranking the top-performing songs in the United States in the adult contemporary music (AC) market. The chart, which in 1991 was published under the title Hot Adult Contemporary, has undergone various name changes during its history but has been published as Adult Contemporary since 1996. In 1991, 18 songs topped the chart based on playlists submitted by radio stations.

In the issue of Billboard dated January 5, the English singer-songwriter Elton John was at number one with "You Gotta Love Someone", its fourth week atop the chart. The song held the top spot for the first two weeks of 1991 before being displaced by "Because I Love You (The Postman Song)" by Stevie B. The year's longest unbroken run at number one was achieved in August and September by the Canadian singer Bryan Adams, whose song "(Everything I Do) I Do It for You" spent eight consecutive weeks in the top spot, the longest run atop the AC chart since Al Stewart spent ten weeks at number one with "Time Passages" in 1978 and 1979. Adams's song, which featured on the soundtrack of the film Robin Hood: Prince of Thieves, also topped Billboard's pop singles chart, the Hot 100, for seven weeks and was ranked by the magazine as the top song of 1991. It also won the Grammy Award for Best Song Written Specifically for a Motion Picture or for Television, as well as being nominated for the Academy Award for Best Song, the first of three Oscar nominations for the singer. Several other songs that topped the AC chart also reached the top spot on the Hot 100, including "The First Time" by Surface and "All the Man That I Need" by Whitney Houston, consecutive AC chart-toppers in February, both of which also reached number one on the Hot R&B Singles listing.

Only two artists achieved more than one AC number one during the year. Amy Grant had two chart-toppers and spent a total of six weeks at number one with "Baby Baby" and "That's What Love Is For", both taken from the album Heart in Motion. Grant had experienced significant success in the contemporary Christian music field since the late 1970s, but had begun to move into the secular market in the late 1980s. Heart in Motion was her first album to be primarily targeted at top 40 radio, and five of its songs reached the top five of the AC chart. Michael Bolton was the only artist to achieve three Hot Adult Contemporary number ones in 1991 and topped the chart for a total of ten weeks with "Love Is a Wonderful Thing", "Time, Love and Tenderness" and "When a Man Loves a Woman", giving him the highest number of weeks atop the chart of any act in 1991. "Love Is a Wonderful Thing" was the only song to be displaced from number one and return to the top spot. The final number one of the year was "Keep Coming Back" by Richard Marx, which spent the final two weeks of the year in the top spot.

== Chart history ==
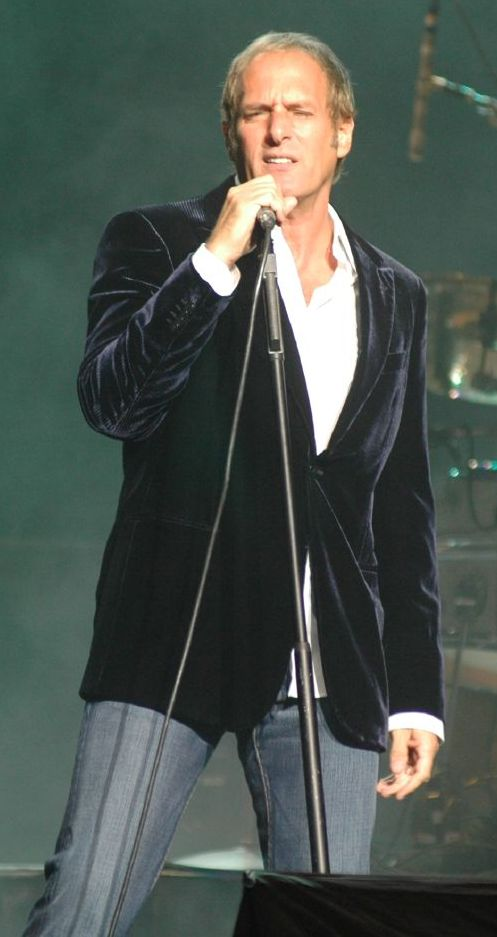
Michael Bolton's three AC number ones was the most achieved by any artist in 1991.

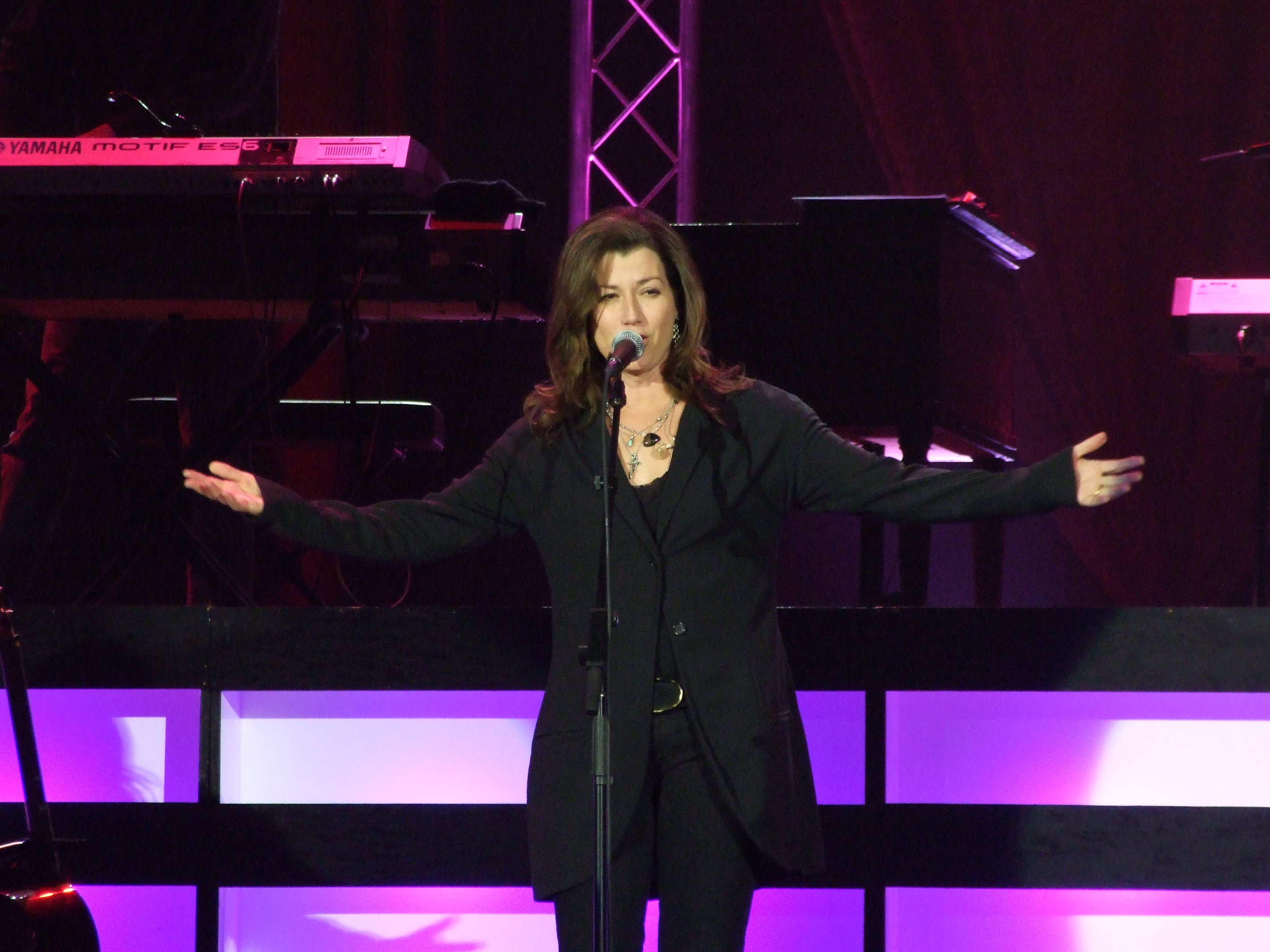
Amy Grant topped the chart with two songs during the year.

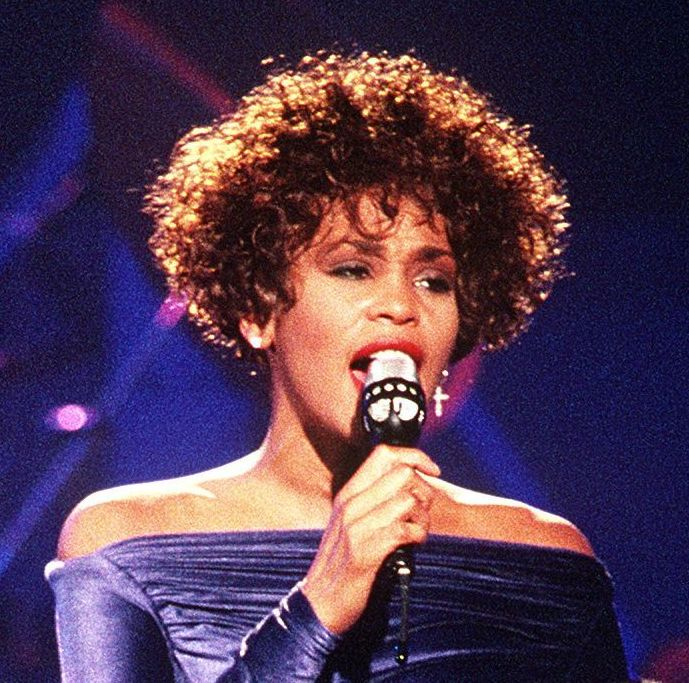
Whitney Houston's song "All the Man That I Need" spent four consecutive weeks at number one.

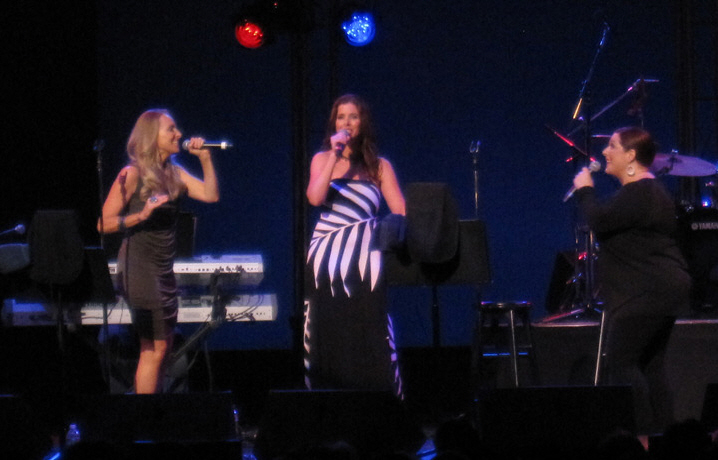
Wilson Phillips topped the chart with "You’re in Love".

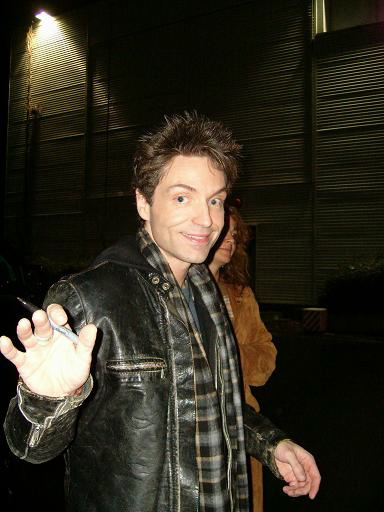
Richard Marx ended the year at number one with "Keep Coming Back".

Chart history
Issue date	Title	Artist(s)	Ref.
January 5	"You Gotta Love Someone"	Elton John	
January 12	"You Gotta Love Someone"	Elton John	
January 19	"Because I Love You (The Postman Song)"	Stevie B	
January 26	"Because I Love You (The Postman Song)"	Stevie B	
February 2	"The First Time"	Surface	
February 9	"The First Time"	Surface	
February 16	"All the Man That I Need"	Whitney Houston	
February 23	"All the Man That I Need"	Whitney Houston	
March 2	"All the Man That I Need"	Whitney Houston	
March 9	"All the Man That I Need"	Whitney Houston	
March 16	"Coming Out of the Dark"	Gloria Estefan	
March 23	"Coming Out of the Dark"	Gloria Estefan	
March 30	"You're in Love"	Wilson Phillips	
April 6	"You're in Love"	Wilson Phillips	
April 13	"You're in Love"	Wilson Phillips	
April 20	"You're in Love"	Wilson Phillips	
April 27	"Cry for Help"	Rick Astley	
May 4	"Baby Baby"	Amy Grant	
May 11	"Baby Baby"	Amy Grant	
May 18	"Baby Baby"	Amy Grant	
May 25	"Love Is a Wonderful Thing"	Michael Bolton	
June 1	"Love Is a Wonderful Thing"	Michael Bolton	
June 8	"I Don't Wanna Cry"	Mariah Carey	
June 15	"Love Is a Wonderful Thing"	Michael Bolton	
June 22	"Love Is a Wonderful Thing"	Michael Bolton	
June 29	"Rush Rush"	Paula Abdul	
July 6	"Rush Rush"	Paula Abdul	
July 13	"Rush Rush"	Paula Abdul	
July 20	"Rush Rush"	Paula Abdul	
July 27	"Rush Rush"	Paula Abdul	
August 3	"(Everything I Do) I Do It for You"	Bryan Adams	
August 10	"(Everything I Do) I Do It for You"	Bryan Adams	
August 17	"(Everything I Do) I Do It for You"	Bryan Adams	
August 24	"(Everything I Do) I Do It for You"	Bryan Adams	
August 31	"(Everything I Do) I Do It for You"	Bryan Adams	
September 7	"(Everything I Do) I Do It for You"	Bryan Adams	
September 14	"(Everything I Do) I Do It for You"	Bryan Adams	
September 21	"(Everything I Do) I Do It for You"	Bryan Adams	
September 28	"Time, Love and Tenderness"	Michael Bolton	
October 5	"Time, Love and Tenderness"	Michael Bolton	
October 12	"Everybody Plays the Fool"	Aaron Neville	
October 19	"Too Many Walls"	Cathy Dennis	
October 26	"Too Many Walls"	Cathy Dennis	
November 2	"When a Man Loves a Woman"	Michael Bolton	
November 9	"When a Man Loves a Woman"	Michael Bolton	
November 16	"When a Man Loves a Woman"	Michael Bolton	
November 23	"When a Man Loves a Woman"	Michael Bolton	
November 30	"That's What Love Is For"	Amy Grant	
December 7	"That's What Love Is For"	Amy Grant	
December 14	"That's What Love Is For"	Amy Grant	
December 21	"Keep Coming Back"	Richard Marx	
December 28	"Keep Coming Back"	Richard Marx	

== See also ==
- 1991 in music
- List of artists who reached number one on the U.S. Adult Contemporary chart
