= The One Thing (album) =

Studio album by Michael Bolton
- Released: November 16, 1993
- Recorded: June – September 1993
- Studios: Out of Pocket Productions (Surrey, England, UK); Passion Studios (Westport, Connecticut); Record Plant (Los Angeles, California); Ocean Way Recording (Hollywood, California); The Enterprise (Burbank, California)
- Length: 51:31
- Label: Columbia
- Producers: Michael Bolton; Robert John "Mutt" Lange; Walter Afanasieff; David Foster

Michael Bolton chronology
The Artistry of Michael Bolotin (1993)	The One Thing (1993)	Greatest Hits (1985–1995) (1995)

Singles from The One Thing
- 1. "Said I Loved You... But I Lied" Released: October 22, 1993; 2. "Soul of My Soul" Released: December 1993; 3. "Completely" Released: March 1994; 4. "Ain't Got Nothing If You Ain't Got Love" Released: April 1994; 5. "Lean on Me" Released: July 1994

Professional ratings
Review scores
Source	Rating
AllMusic	3/5 stars
Chicago Tribune	1/4 stars
The Rolling Stone Album Guide	1.5/5 stars

The One Thing is the ninth album by Michael Bolton, released on November 16, 1993. Although it produced the hit single "Said I Loved You... But I Lied", which reached number 6 in the US, it did not match the sales of his previous three albums. Nevertheless, the album was still a respectable hit on its own, reaching number 3 on the Billboard 200 and being certified triple platinum in the US. It was also certified Platinum in the United Kingdom.

Like his previous album, Bolton co-produced all the tracks and co-wrote all but two songs.

== Track listing ==
No.	Title	Writer(s)	Producer(s)	Length
1.	"Said I Loved You... But I Lied"	Michael Bolton; Robert John "Mutt" Lange	Lange; Bolton	5:07
2.	"I'm Not Made of Steel"	Bolton; Diane Warren; Lange	Lange; Bolton	5:11
3.	"The One Thing"	Bolton; Warren; Desmond Child	Walter Afanasieff; Bolton	5:11
4.	"Soul of My Soul"	Bolton; Warren; Walter Afanasieff	Afanasieff; Bolton	5:42
5.	"Completely"	Warren	David Foster; Bolton	4:25
6.	"Lean on Me"	Bill Withers	Afanasieff; Bolton	5:20
7.	"Ain't Got Nothing If You Ain't Got Love"	Bolton; Lange	Lange; Bolton	5:04
8.	"A Time for Letting Go"	Bolton; Warren	Afanasieff; Bolton	5:38
9.	"Never Get Enough of Your Love"	Bolton; Warren; Afanasieff	Afanasieff; Bolton	5:06
10.	"In the Arms of Love"	Bolton; Warren; Child	Foster; Bolton	4:47
Total length:				51:31

UK bonus track
No.	Title	Writer(s)	Length
11.	"The Voice of My Heart"	Bolton; Lange; Warren; Child	4:47
Total length:			56:18

== Personnel ==
Musicians

- Michael Bolton – vocals
- Phil Nicholas – keyboards (1, 2), programming (1, 2, 7)
- Walter Afanasieff – keyboards (3, 4, 6, 8, 9), synthesizers (3, 4, 6, 8, 9), synth bass (3, 4, 6, 8, 9), drum programming (3, 4, 6, 8, 9), rhythm programming (3, 4, 6, 8, 9), Hammond B3 organ (6)
- Gary Cirimelli – synthesizer programming (3, 4, 6, 8, 9), Macintosh programming (3, 4, 6, 8, 9), digital programming (3, 4, 6, 8, 9)
- Ren Klyce – digital programming (3, 6)
- David Foster – keyboards (5)
- Claude Gaudette – synthesizer programming (5)
- Randy Kerber – keyboards (10)
- Simon Franglen – additional synthesizer programming (10)
- Dann Huff – guitars (1, 2, 7), additional guitars (4), acoustic nylon guitar (4), guitar solo (9)
- Michael Landau – guitars (3, 4, 6, 8, 9)
- Michael Thompson – guitars (5)
- Mutt Lange – rhythm guitar (7)
- John Robinson – drums (5)
- Stephen "Doc" Kupka – baritone saxophone (6)
- Emilio Castillo – tenor saxophone (6)
- David Mann – tenor saxophone (6)
- Lee Thornburg – trombone (6), trumpet (6)
- Greg Adams – trumpet (6)

Music arrangements

- Walter Afanasieff – arrangements (3, 4, 6, 8, 9)
- Michael Bolton – arrangements (3, 4, 8, 9)
- David Foster – arrangements (5), orchestra arrangements (5)
- Jeremy Lubbock – orchestra arrangements (5, 10) conductor (10)
- Joey Melotti – arrangements (6)

Background vocalists

- Mutt Lange – backing vocals (1, 2, 7)
- Bridgette Bryant – backing vocals (3)
- Jim Gilstrap – backing vocals (3, 4, 6, 9)
- Pat Hawk – backing vocals (3, 4, 6, 7, 9)
- Dorian Holley – backing vocals (3, 4, 6, 9)
- Phillip Ingram – backing vocals (3, 4, 9)
- Van Johnson – backing vocals (3, 4, 6, 7, 9)
- Janis Liebhart – backing vocals (3, 4, 6, 7, 9)
- Johnny Britt – backing vocals (6)
- Portia Griffin – backing vocals (6)
- Phil Perry – backing vocals (6)
- Carmen Twillie – backing vocals (6)
- Mona Lisa Young – backing vocals (6)
- Patty Darcy – backing vocals (7)
- Stevie Vann – backing vocals (7)
- Gary Cirimelli – backing vocals (9)
- Skyler Jett – backing vocals (9)
- Claytoven Richardson – backing vocals (9)

== Production ==
- Stephen McNamara – pre-programming (1, 2, 7), second engineer (1, 2, 7)
- Jan Mullaney – pre-programming (1, 2, 7), additional vocal engineer (4, 6, 8)
- Dave Reitzas – vocal engineer, overdub engineer (1, 2, 7), recording (5, 10)
- Dave Bascombe – mixing (1, 2, 7)
- Dana Jon Chappelle – engineer (3, 4, 6, 8, 9), vocal engineer (3, 4, 6, 8), mixing (4, 8, 9), BGV recording (7)
- Mick Guzauski – mixing (3, 6)
- Humberto Gatica – engineer (5)
- Al Schmitt – mixing (5, 10), engineer (10), recording (10)
- Max Hayes – second engineer (1, 2, 7)
- Geoff Hunt – second engineer (1, 2, 7)
- Kyle Bess – second engineer (3, 4, 6, 8, 9)
- Craig Brock – second engineer (3, 4, 6, 8, 9)
- Bill Leonard – second engineer (3, 6)
- Steve Milo – second engineer (3, 4, 6, 8, 9)
- Michael Reiter – second engineer (4, 5, 9, 10)
- Manny Marroquin – second engineer (9)
- Vlado Meller – mastering at Sony Music Studio Operations (New York City, New York)
- Christopher Austopchek – art direction
- June Hong – design
- Timothy White – photography
- Nancy Sprague – grooming
- Genina Aboittz – stylist
- Louis Levin – direction
- Kim Bullock – management for Louis Levin Management
- Jill Tiger – management for Louis Levin Management

== Charts ==
Chart performance for The One Thing
Chart (1993–1994)	Peak position
Australian Albums (ARIA)	1
Austrian Albums (Ö3 Austria)	28
Dutch Albums (Album Top 100)	65
German Albums (Offizielle Top 100)	5
New Zealand Albums (RMNZ)	4
Norwegian Albums (VG-lista)	13
Portuguese Albums (AFP)	1
Swedish Albums (Sverigetopplistan)	8
Swiss Albums (Schweizer Hitparade)	13
UK Albums (Official Charts)	4
US Billboard 200	3

== Certifications ==
Region	Certification	Certified units/sales
Australia (ARIA)	2× Platinum	140,000^{^}
Canada (Music Canada)	3× Platinum	300,000^{^}
Germany (BVMI)	Gold	250,000^{^}
New Zealand (RMNZ)	Platinum	15,000^{^}
Spain (Promusicae)	Gold	50,000^{^}
Switzerland (IFPI Switzerland)	Gold	25,000^{^}
United Kingdom (BPI)	Platinum	300,000^{^}
United States (RIAA)	3× Platinum	3,000,000^{^}
Summaries
Europe (IFPI)	Platinum	1,000,000^{*}
^{*} Sales figures based on certification alone.^{^} Shipments figures based on certification alone.
