= Timeless: The Classics =

Studio album by Michael Bolton
- Released: September 29, 1992
- Recorded: February–June 1992
- Studios: Record Plant and Westlake Studios (Los Angeles, California); Ocean Way Recording, Conway Studios and A&M Studios (Hollywood, California); The Plant (Sausalito, California); The Enterprise (Burbank, California); The Hit Factory (New York City, New York); Passion Studios (Westport, Connecticut)
- Genres: Soul, pop
- Length: 40:05
- Labels: Columbia; 52783
- Producers: Walter Afanasieff; Michael Bolton; David Foster

Michael Bolton chronology
Time, Love & Tenderness (1991)	Timeless: The Classics (1992)	The Artistry of Michael Bolotin (1993)

Singles from Timeless: The Classics
- 1. "To Love Somebody" Released: September 1992; 2. "Drift Away" Released: October 1992; 3. "Reach Out I'll Be There" Released: November 1992

Timeless: The Classics is a 1992 album of cover versions by Michael Bolton. It was #1 on the Billboard charts when it was released. After a rather long chart run, the album has been certified 4× Platinum in the US and has sold over 7 million copies worldwide.

Professional ratings
Review scores
Source	Rating
AllMusic	link
Entertainment Weekly	D link
Los Angeles Times	link
Orlando Sentinel	1/3 stars
Q	link
The Rolling Stone Album Guide	1/5 stars

== Track listing ==
Timeless: The Classics
No.	Title	Writer(s)	Originally Recorded by	Length
1.	"Since I Fell for You"	Buddy Johnson	Ella Johnson	3:09
2.	"To Love Somebody"	Barry Gibb, Robin Gibb	The Bee Gees	4:09
3.	"Reach Out I'll Be There" (featuring The Four Tops)	Lamont Dozier, Brian Holland, Eddie Holland	The Four Tops	3:54
4.	"You Send Me"	Sam Cooke	Sam Cooke	4:00
5.	"Yesterday"	Lennon–McCartney	The Beatles	3:31
6.	"Hold On, I'm Comin'"	Isaac Hayes, David Porter	Sam & Dave	3:15
7.	"Bring It On Home to Me"	Cooke	Sam Cooke	4:27
8.	"Knock on Wood"	Steve Cropper, Eddie Floyd	Eddie Floyd	3:51
9.	"Drift Away"	Mentor Williams	Mike Berry	6:07
10.	"White Christmas"	Irving Berlin	Bing Crosby	3:42
Total length:				40:05

== Production ==
- Michael Bolton – producer
- David Foster – producer (1, 2, 4, 5, 7, 10)
- Walter Afanasieff – producer (3, 6, 8, 9)
- Christopher Austopchuk – art direction
- Matthew Rolston – photography
- Sarah Hall – personal assistant
- Gemina Aboitiz – stylist
- Nancy Sprague – grooming
- Louis Levin – direction
- Jill Tiger – management for Louis Levin Management

Technical

- Vlado Meller – mastering at Sony Music Studio Operations (New York, NY)
- Dave Reitzas – engineer (1, 2, 4, 5, 7), vocal engineer (1, 2, 4, 5, 7, 10), mixing (7)
- Bill Schnee – engineer (1, 2, 4, 5, 7)
- Al Schmitt – orchestra engineer (1, 2, 4, 5, 7), mixing (1, 5, 10), engineer (10)
- Mick Guzauski – mixing (2, 4)
- Dana Jon Chappelle – engineer (3, 6, 8, 9), mixing (3, 6, 8, 9)
- Kyle Bess – recording assistant (1, 2, 4, 5, 7, 10) second engineer (3, 6, 8)
- Craig Brock – recording assistant (1, 2, 4, 5, 7, 10)
- Chris Fogel – recording assistant (1, 2, 4, 5, 7, 10)
- Steve Harrison – recording assistant (1, 2, 4, 5, 7, 10)
- Noel Hazen – recording assistant (1, 2, 4, 5, 7, 10)
- Steve Milo – recording assistant (1, 2, 4, 5, 7, 10)
- Marnie Riley – recording assistant (1, 2, 4, 5, 7, 10)
- Eric Rudd – recording assistant (1, 2, 4, 5, 7, 10) second engineer (3, 6, 8)
- Brian Scheuble – recording assistant (1, 2, 4, 5, 7, 10)
- Brett Swain – recording assistant (1, 2, 4, 5, 7, 10)
- Mark Hensley – second engineer (3, 6, 8)
- Manny LaCarubba – second engineer (3, 6, 8)

== Personnel ==
- Michael Bolton – lead vocals, arrangements (1, 2, 4, 5, 7, 10), rhythm arrangements (1, 2, 5, 7), backing vocals (6)
- David Foster – arrangements (1, 2, 4, 5, 7, 10), rhythm arrangements (1, 2, 5, 7), additional keyboards (2, 5)
- Randy Kerber – acoustic piano (1, 2, 4, 5, 8), Hammond B3 organ (6), organ (7), electric piano (10)
- Greg Phillinganes – organ (2), acoustic piano (7)
- Robbie Buchanan – additional keyboards (2, 5)
- Walter Afanasieff – keyboards (3, 9), synthesizers (3, 9), Hammond B3 organ (3, 8, 9), bass (3, 9), rhythm programming (3, 9), acoustic piano (6), horn arrangements (6, 8)
- Gary Cirimelli – Akai programming (3), Macintosh programming (3, 6, 8, 9), Synclavier programming (3, 9), additional backing vocals (9)
- Ren Klyce – Synclavier programming (3, 9), Akai programming (3, 9)
- Ian Underwood – acoustic piano (10)
- Dean Parks – acoustic guitar (1, 5)
- Michael Thompson – electric guitar (1, 2, 4, 5, 7), guitars (6, 8)
- Vernon "Ice" Black – guitars (3)
- Michael Landau – additional guitars (6, 8), guitars (9)
- Neil Stubenhaus – bass guitar (1, 4, 5, 8)
- Nathan East – bass guitar (2, 7)
- Randy Jackson – bass guitar (6)
- John Robinson – drums (1, 2, 4–8)
- Joel Peskin – saxophone solo (4)
- Portia Griffin – backing vocals (2, 7, 8), additional backing vocals (3, 9)
- Pat Hawk – backing vocals (2, 7, 8), additional backing vocals (3, 9)
- Vann Johnson – backing vocals (2, 7, 8), additional backing vocals (3, 9)
- Janis Liebhart – backing vocals (2, 7, 8), additional backing vocals (3, 9)
- Carmen Twillie – backing vocals (2, 7), additional backing vocals (3)
- Mona Lisa Young – backing vocals (2, 7, 8), additional backing vocals (3, 9)
- The Four Tops – backing vocals (3)
- Yvonne Williams – backing vocals (8), additional backing vocals (9)
- Claytoven Richardson – additional backing vocals (9)
- The PH1 Choir – backing vocals (9)
- Patrick Henderson – choir director and vocal arrangements (9)

Tower Of Power Horn Section (Tracks 6 & 8)

- Stephen "Doc" Kupka – baritone saxophone
- Emilio Castillo – tenor saxophone
- Gary Herbig – tenor saxophone
- Lee Thornburg – trombone, trumpet
- Greg Adams – trumpet, horn arrangements

Orchestra (Tracks 1, 2, 4, 5, 7 & 10)

- Johnny Mandel – orchestra arrangements and conductor (1, 5, 7, 10)
- Jeremy Lubbock – orchestra arrangements and conductor (2)
- David Foster – string arrangements (4)
- Gerald Vinci – concertmaster
- Debbie Datz-Pyle and Patti Zimmitti – contractors
- Donald Ashworth, Jon Clarke, Gary Foster, Glen Garrett, Dan Higgins, Marty Krystall, Jack Nimitz and Bob Sheppard – woodwinds
- Jim Atkinson, Jeff DeRosa, Brian O'Connor, Calvin Smith, Richard Todd and Brad Warnaar – French horn
- Larry Bunker – percussion
- Chuck Domanico, Edward Meares, Buell Neidlinger and Margaret Storer – bass guitar
- Robert Adcock, Jodi Burnett, Larry Corbett, Ronald Cooper, Christine Ermacoff, Marie Fera, Paula Hochholter, Judy Johnson, Anne Karam, Suzie Katayama, Dane Little, Frederick Seykora, Christina Soule and David Speltz – cello
- Gayle Levant – harp
- Denyse Buffum, Brian Dembow, Alan DeVeritch, Roland Kato, Donald McInnis, Cynthia Morrow, Carole Mukogawa, Dan Neufeld, Kazi Pitelka, Harry Shirinian, Linn Subotnick, Ray Tischer and Mihail Zinovyev – viola
- Dixie Blackstone, Mari Botnick, Robert Brousseau, Russ Cantor, Isabelle Daskoff, Assa Drori, Henry Ferber, Ronald Folsom, Armen Garabedian, Berj Garabedian, Harris Goldman, Gwen Heller, Reginald Hill, Bill Hybel, Lisa Johnson, Karen Jones, Kathleen Lenski, Norma Leonard, Rene Mandel, Michael Markman, Betty Moor, Irma Neumann, Donald Palmer, Claudia Parducci, Sheldon Sanov, Haim Shtrum, Robert Sushel, Gerald Vinci and Dorothy Wade – violin

== Charts ==
=== Weekly charts ===
Weekly chart performance for Timeless: The Classics
Chart (1992–1993)	Peak position
Australian Albums (ARIA)	2
Austrian Albums (Ö3 Austria)	25
Canada Top Albums/CDs (RPM)	5
Dutch Albums (Album Top 100)	27
European Albums (European Top 100 Albums)	13
Finnish Albums (Suomen virallinen lista)	11
German Albums (Offizielle Top 100)	42
New Zealand Albums (RMNZ)	9
Norwegian Albums (VG-lista)	10
Swedish Albums (Sverigetopplistan)	14
UK Albums (Official Charts)	3
US Billboard 200	1

=== Year-end charts ===
1992 year-end chart performance for Timeless: The Classics
Chart (1992)	Position
Canada Top Albums/CDs (RPM)	48
European Top 100 Albums (Music & Media)	87
UK Albums (OCC)	7
US Billboard 200	68

1993 year-end chart performance for Timeless: The Classics
Chart (1993)	Position
Australian Albums (ARIA)	50
Canada Top Albums/CDs (RPM)	28
European Albums (European Top 100 Albums)	97
New Zealand Albums (RMNZ)	37
US Billboard 200	11

== Certifications ==
Certifications and sales for Timeless: The Classics
Region	Certification	Certified units/sales
Australia (ARIA)	2× Platinum	140,000^{^}
Canada (Music Canada)	4× Platinum	400,000^{^}
Japan (RIAJ)	Gold	100,000^{^}
New Zealand (RMNZ)	Gold	7,500^{^}
Spain (Promusicae)	Gold	50,000^{^}
Sweden (GLF)	Gold	50,000^{^}
United Kingdom (BPI)	3× Platinum	900,000^{^}
United States (RIAA)	4× Platinum	4,000,000^{^}
^{^} Shipments figures based on certification alone.
