= The Artistry of Michael Bolotin =

Compilation album by Michael Bolton
- Released: March 1993
- Genre: Rock
- Length: 39:01
- Label: RCA
- Producer: Compilation producer: Chick Crumpacker; original recordings produced by Jack Richardson, Joe Cy, Michael Bolton

Michael Bolton chronology
Timeless: The Classics (1992)	The Artistry of Michael Bolotin (1993)	The One Thing (1993)

Professional ratings
Review scores
Source	Rating
Allmusic	2/5 stars

The Artistry of Michael Bolotin is an album by Michael Bolton. The third and final album, using his given name. It is a compilation from his first 2 RCA albums (Michael Bolotin, 1975 and Everyday of My Life, 1976).

== Track listing ==
1. "Rocky Mountain Way" (Joe Walsh, Kenny Passarelli, Rocky Grace, Joe Vitale)
2. "Time Is on My Side" (Norman Meade)
3. "Your Love" (Michael Bolton)
4. "You're No Good" (Clint Ballard Jr.)
5. "It's Just a Feeling" (Bolton)
6. "Take Me As I Am" (Bolton)
7. "Dancing in the Street" (Marvin Gaye, Ivy Hunter, William R. Stevenson Jr.)
8. "These Eyes" (Burton Cummings, Randy Bachman)
9. "If I Had Your Love" (Bolton)
10. "Lost in the City" (Wayne Perkins)
