= Love Is a Wonderful Thing (Michael Bolton song) =

1991 single by Michael Bolton

Single by Michael Bolton

from the album Time, Love & Tenderness
- Released: April 1, 1991
- Genre: R&B
- Length: 4:42 (album version); 4:21 (video edit)
- Label: Columbia
- Songwriters: Michael Bolton; Andrew Goldmark
- Producer: Walter Afanasieff

Michael Bolton singles chronology
"Georgia on My Mind" (1990)	"Love Is a Wonderful Thing" (1991)	"Time, Love and Tenderness" (1991)

Music video
- "Love Is a Wonderful Thing" on YouTube

"Love Is a Wonderful Thing" is a song by American pop music singer Michael Bolton, written by Bolton and Andrew Goldmark and produced by Walter Afanasieff. The song, which peaked at number four on the US Billboard Hot 100, was included on Bolton's seventh album, Time, Love & Tenderness (1991), and released in April 1991 by Columbia Records. It was also successful in Canada, becoming Bolton's third number-two hit, and in Norway, where it reached number seven. The accompanying music video for "Love Is a Wonderful Thing" was directed by Dominic Sena and shot in Phoenix, Arizona.

== Critical reception ==
Pan-European magazine Music & Media wrote, "Yet more substantiation of his nickname the "soul provider". Hit material."

== Plagiarism lawsuit ==
The American R&B group the Isley Brothers wrote a song titled "Love Is a Wonderful Thing" and recorded it for United Artists Records in January 1964. The song was released as a single on a 45 rpm vinyl record on United Artists' Veep label in June 1966, and it reached number 110 on Billboard's Bubbling Under Hot 100 Singles chart. The song was not included on an album until it appeared on The Isley Brothers - The Complete UA Sessions, which was released in 1991.

On February 24, 1992, the Isley Brothers filed a lawsuit for copyright infringement against Bolton, Goldmark and Sony Music Publishing. "When I first heard his version of the song on the radio, I was really pleased," said Ronald Isley. "Then I went out to pick up the record and looked for my credit. I was upset because the credits weren't on there. So we got in touch with his people and then he went into the 'Oh, I didn't know you all had a song like this.' That type of thing."

Bolton claimed he had never heard the Isley Brothers' version. "The song is an original song," said Louis Levin, Bolton's manager. "We view the claim to be without merit and are vigorously defending the matter."

On April 25, 1994, a Los Angeles jury ruled in favor of the Isley Brothers. The jury determined there were five instances in which the Bolton/Goldmark song plagiarized the Isleys' tune. They ruled that 66 percent of the song's profits came from copyright-infringed material and 28 percent of the profits from the album Time, Love & Tenderness were derived from the track. Bolton, Goldmark and Sony Publishing were ordered to turn over more than $5 million in profits from the sales of Bolton's version of the song to the Isley Brothers. It was the largest award in history for plagiarism in the music industry.

Opinions on the verdict were divided. Some, such as Rolling Stone contributor Havelock Nelson, agreed with the jury. "Bolton’s song does bear a slight similarity to the Isleys’—enough to call it a knockoff," Nelson said. "Both titles have a bright, gospelly feel and a similar, repeated hook line." Others, like Michael Walsh of Time, disagreed with the ruling. "The verdict’s an utter travesty rendered by unmusical jurors," Walsh stated. "Aside from the fact that they have the same title, and the melody begins on the third note of the scale, the two songs bear no resemblance in any significant musical way."

Bolton, Goldmark and Sony appealed the verdict, and the court fight continued for nearly seven more years. The case came to a close on January 22, 2001, when the Supreme Court of the United States refused to hear the appeal of a May 2000 decision by the Ninth Circuit Court Of Appeals in San Francisco.

Bolton's attorneys, including Harvard University law professor Alan Dershowitz, had asked the Supreme Court to reject the findings, arguing a national standard should be created to help guide artists and the courts as to what classifies as copyright infringement. The Recording Industry Association of America (RIAA) agreed, and filed a brief with the Supreme Court supporting Bolton in his appeal.

Under the Ninth Circuit ruling, the Isleys were to be paid $4.2 million from Sony Music; $932,924 from Bolton; $220,785 from Goldmark; and the balance from Bolton and Goldmark's music publishing company.

== Personnel ==
- Michael Bolton – lead vocals
- Walter Afanasieff – keyboards, Hammond B-3 organ, synthesizers, synth bass, drums, percussion
- Michael Landau – guitar
- Marc Russo – tenor saxophone solo
- Jerry Hey, Gary Grant, Larry Williams, Dan Higgins – horns
- Shaun Murphy, Jean McClain, Tanya Scarlett, Laura Creamer, Jeanie Tracy, Kitty Beethoven, Claytoven Richardson, Sandy Griffith, Melisa Kary – background vocals
- Ren Klyce, Louis Biancaniello – programming

== Charts ==
=== Weekly charts ===
Chart (1991)	Peak position
Australia (ARIA)	25
Austria (Ö3 Austria Top 40)	26
Belgium (Ultratop 50 Flanders)	31
Canada Top Singles (RPM)	2
Canada Adult Contemporary (RPM)	1
Europe (Eurochart Hot 100)	37
Europe (European Hit Radio)	1
Germany (GfK)	40
Ireland (IRMA)	23
Luxembourg (Radio Luxembourg)	12
Netherlands (Dutch Top 40)	34
Netherlands (Single Top 100)	44
New Zealand (Recorded Music NZ)	12
Norway (VG-lista)	7
Sweden (Sverigetopplistan)	16
Switzerland (Schweizer Hitparade)	28
UK Singles (Official Charts)	23
UK Airplay (Music Week)	1
US Billboard Hot 100	4
US Adult Contemporary (Billboard)	1
US Cash Box Top 100	3

=== Year-end charts ===
Chart (1991)	Position
Canada Top Singles (RPM)	13
Canada Adult Contemporary (RPM)	3
Europe (European Hit Radio)	10
Sweden (Topplistan)	82
US Billboard Hot 100	49
US Adult Contemporary (Billboard)	5
US Cash Box Top 100	18

== See also ==
- List of European number-one airplay songs of the 1990s
