= Time, Love & Tenderness =

Studio album by Michael Bolton
- Released: April 23, 1991
- Recorded: March–December 1990
- Studio: The Plant Studios (Sausalito, California); Record Plant (Los Angeles, California); Conway Studios and Soundhouse Studios (Hollywood, California); The Hit Factory and The Power Station (New York, New York)
- Genre: Adult contemporary, pop
- Length: 44:45
- Label: Columbia
- Producer: Walter Afanasieff; Michael Bolton

Michael Bolton chronology
Soul Provider (1989)	Time, Love & Tenderness (1991)	Timeless: The Classics (1992)

Singles from Time, Love & Tenderness
- 1. "Love Is a Wonderful Thing" Released: April 1991; 2. "Time, Love and Tenderness" Released: July 1991; 3. "When a Man Loves a Woman" Released: October 1991; 4. "Missing You Now" Released: December 1991; 5. "Steel Bars" Released: February 1992

Time, Love & Tenderness is the seventh studio album by American recording artist Michael Bolton. The album was released on April 23, 1991, by Columbia Records; it was produced by Walter Afanasieff and Michael Bolton. To date, the record has sold more than 16 million copies worldwide, becoming the best-selling album of his career.

The album topped the Billboard 200 chart and produced four Top 40 singles: a cover of Percy Sledge's "When a Man Loves a Woman" reached No. 1 on the Billboard Hot 100 chart, "Love Is a Wonderful Thing" reached No. 4, "Time, Love and Tenderness" reached No. 7, and "Missing You Now" reached No. 12. All four singles reached the Top 40 in the UK as well, as did a fifth single released only in the UK, "Steel Bars", which was the result of Bolton's songwriting collaboration with Bob Dylan.

== Controversy ==
In 1964, the American R&B group the Isley Brothers recorded a song titled "Love Is a Wonderful Thing". Not included on an Isley Brothers album until years later, the song was released as a single in 1966 on a 45 rpm vinyl record, and it "bubbled under" the Billboard chart, meaning that it peaked between numbers 101 and 125 on the Hot 100. Bolton's song contained similarities to the song by the Isleys that exceeded the title: in 1994, a jury found songwriters Bolton and Goldmark, along with Sony Music Entertainment (the parent company of Bolton's label, Columbia Records), liable for copyright infringement due to multiple similarities between the two songs and ordered them to pay the Isleys all profits earned from the single plus 28% of the album profits, which amounted to over US$5 million. On May 9, 2000, the 9th Circuit Court of Appeals, an appellate court covering the western regions of the U.S., affirmed the jury's decision, which is one of the largest monetary sums to be awarded in a case such as this. On January 22, 2001, the Supreme Court of the United States declined to review the decision of the appellate court despite Bolton's claims that he had never heard the Isley Brothers recording (although he was a fan of their music) and that he was exercising his right to "independent creation". The decision by the Supreme Court not to hear the case resulted in the original verdict remaining valid.

== Reception ==
Professional ratings
Review scores
Source	Rating
AllMusic	4/5 stars
Chicago Tribune	2.5/4 stars
Robert Christgau	(dud)
Entertainment Weekly	D−
Los Angeles Times	2.5/5 stars
Music & Media	(favorable)
The Rolling Stone Album Guide	1/5 stars
The Windsor Star	C

The massive commercial success of Time, Love & Tenderness is sharply contrasted with its critical reception, marked by mostly negative reviews.

In one of the album's few positive reviews, AllMusic criticized the album as a clone of its predecessor, Soul Provider, particularly deriding the cover of "When a Man Loves a Woman" as the album's "obligatory R&B carbon copy". However, they praised the songwriting of Diane Warren, as well as Bolton's singing and his songwriting on the track "Steel Bars".

The Chicago Tribune gave it one of its few mixed reviews, saying that Bolton's talent as a vocalist is generally outweighed by the mediocre material, but that "When a Man Loves a Woman", "We're Not Makin' Love Anymore", "Missing You Now", and "Love Is a Wonderful Thing" are all strong moments. Los Angeles Times also gave a mixed review, calling the album "commercial" and "glitzy", but praising it as containing Bolton's strongest material to date.

However, Entertainment Weekly thoroughly panned the album, declaring that "Bolton's singing amounts to gimmicks ... that replicate soul mannerisms without a hint of that music's power for re-creating human feeling." They derided the album's R&B covers as lacking sensitivity and the original cuts as being formulaic.

The Rolling Stone Album Guide was also mostly negative, criticizing Bolton's vocals on the album for the same reasons as Entertainment Weekly did.

In his Consumer Guide, Robert Christgau gave the album a "dud" rating, calling it "a bad record whose details rarely merit further thought."

== Track listing ==
Time, Love & Tenderness track listing
No.	Title	Writer(s)	Length
1.	"Love Is a Wonderful Thing"	Michael Bolton, Andrew Goldmark	4:43
2.	"Time, Love and Tenderness"	Diane Warren	5:31
3.	"Missing You Now" (Featuring Kenny G)	Bolton, Walter Afanasieff, Warren	4:33
4.	"Forever Isn't Long Enough"	Bolton, Warren, Desmond Child	4:32
5.	"Now That I Found You"	Bolton, Warren	4:32
6.	"When a Man Loves a Woman" (Percy Sledge cover)	Calvin Lewis, Andrew Wright	3:52
7.	"We're Not Makin' Love Anymore" (Duet with Patti LaBelle) (Barbra Streisand cover)	Bolton, Warren	4:41
8.	"New Love"	Bolton, Warren, Child	4:32
9.	"Save Me"	Bolton, Afanasieff, Goldmark	4:21
10.	"Steel Bars"	Bolton, Bob Dylan	3:28
Total length:			44:45

== Personnel ==
- Michael Bolton – lead vocals, horn arrangements (1), backing vocals (2, 4)
- Walter Afanasieff – keyboards, synthesizers, Hammond B3 organ (1, 4, 6, 10), synth bass (1–5, 7–9), drums (1–5, 7–10), percussion (1–5, 7–10), horn arrangements (1)
- Louis Biancaniello – programming (1, 3, 4, 7, 9)
- Ren Klyce – programming (1–4, 7–10)
- Gary Cirimelli – programming (2, 4, 8, 10), backing vocals (4, 6, 9, 10)
- John Beasley – acoustic piano (6)
- Michael Landau – guitars (1–5, 8–10)
- Chris Camozzi – guitars (6, 7)
- Michael Thompson – guitars (6)
- Randy Jackson – bass guitar (6, 10)
- Jeff Porcaro – drums (6)
- Gigi Gonaway – timbales (2)
- Dan Higgins – saxophones (1)
- Larry Williams – saxophones (1)
- Marc Russo – tenor sax solo (1, 9)
- Kenny G – soprano sax solo (3)
- Gary Grant – trumpet (1)
- Jerry Hey – trumpet (1)
- Kitty Beethoven – backing vocals (1–3, 6, 8–10)
- Laura Creamer – backing vocals (1)
- Sandy Griffith – backing vocals (1–4, 6, 8–10)
- Melissa Kary – backing vocals (1, 4, 6, 8–10)
- Jean McClain – backing vocals (1, 4)
- Shaun Murphy – backing vocals (1, 4)
- Claytoven Richardson – backing vocals (1–4, 6, 8–10)
- Tanya Scarlett – backing vocals (1)
- Jeanie Tracy – backing vocals (1–4, 6, 8–10)
- Larry Batiste – backing vocals (2)
- Chris Hawkins – backing vocals (2)
- Joe Turano – backing vocals (2, 4)
- Vicki Randle – backing vocals (3)
- Terry Brock – backing vocals (4)
- Desmond Child – backing vocals (4)
- Joe Lynn Turner – backing vocals (4)
- Myriam Valle – backing vocals (4)
- Patti LaBelle – lead vocals (7)

Technical credits

- Dana Jon Chappelle – recording engineer, mixing (track 9)
- Michael Christopher – recording engineer
- Michael Gilbert – mix assistant (track 9)
- Mick Guzauski – mixing (tracks 1 and 3–9)
- Mick Higgins – assistant engineer
- Richard Kerr – recording engineer
- Manny Lacarrubba – mixing (tracks 1 and 3–8)
- Matt Lamonica – assistant engineer
- Vlado Meller – mastering at Sony Music Studio Operations (New York, NY)
- Jim Mitchell – assistant engineer
- Devon Rietveld – mixing (tracks 1 and 3–8)
- Marnie Lehmann Riley – assistant engineer
- Roger Talkov – recording engineer
- David Thoener – mixing (2, 10)

Other credits

- Christopher Austopchuk – art direction
- Nancy Danahy – design
- Louis Levin – direction
- Nancy Sprague – hair and make-up
- Timothy White – photography

== Charts ==
=== Weekly charts ===
Chart (1991–1992)	Peak position
Australian Albums (ARIA)	11
Austrian Albums (Ö3 Austria)	4
Dutch Albums (Album Top 100)	8
Finnish Albums (Suomen virallinen lista)	3
German Albums (Offizielle Top 100)	18
New Zealand Albums (RMNZ)	12
Norwegian Albums (VG-lista)	1
Swedish Albums (Sverigetopplistan)	2
Swiss Albums (Schweizer Hitparade)	8
UK Albums (OCC)	2
US Billboard 200	1

=== Year-end charts ===
Chart (1991)	Position
German Albums (Offizielle Top 100)	79
New Zealand Albums (RMNZ)	48
Swiss Albums (Schweizer Hitparade)	25
US Billboard 200	14

Chart (1992)	Position
Dutch Albums (Album Top 100)	84
US Billboard 200	8

Chart (1993)	Position
US Billboard 200	78

=== Decade-end charts ===
Chart (1990–1999)	Position
US Billboard 200	36

== Certifications ==
Region	Certification	Certified units/sales
Australia (ARIA)	Platinum	70,000^{^}
Canada (Music Canada)	7× Platinum	700,000^{^}
Japan (RIAJ)	Gold	100,000^{^}
Netherlands (NVPI)	Gold	50,000^{^}
Spain (Promusicae)	Gold	50,000^{^}
Sweden (GLF)	Gold	50,000^{^}
Switzerland (IFPI Switzerland)	Gold	25,000^{^}
United Kingdom (BPI)	4× Platinum	1,200,000^{^}
United States (RIAA)	8× Platinum	8,000,000^{^}
Summaries
Southeast Asia	—	500,000
^{^} Shipments figures based on certification alone.
