= When a Man Loves a Woman (song) =

1966 single by Percy Sledge

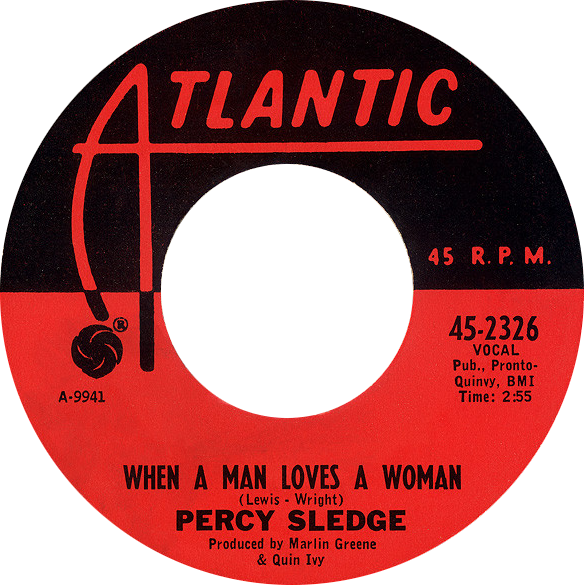

Single by Percy Sledge

from the album When a Man Loves a Woman
- B-side: "Love Me Like You Mean It"
- Released: March 1966
- Recorded: February 17, 1966
- Studio: Norala (Sheffield, Alabama)
- Genre: Southern soul
- Length: 2:54
- Label: Atlantic
- Songwriters: Calvin Lewis, Andrew Wright
- Producers: Marlin Greene, Quin Ivy

Percy Sledge singles chronology
"Warm And Tender Love" (1966)	"When a Man Loves a Woman" (1966)	"Baby, Help Me" (1967)

"When a Man Loves a Woman" is a song written by Calvin Lewis and Andrew Wright and first recorded by the American singer Percy Sledge in 1966 at Norala Sound Studio in Sheffield, Alabama. It made number one on both the US Billboard Hot 100 and Cash Box Top 100, as well as on the Billboard R&B singles chart. Country singer John Wesley Ryles had a minor hit with his version of the song in 1976. Singer and actress Bette Midler recorded the song and had a top-40 hit with her version in 1980. In 1991, Michael Bolton recorded the song; his version peaked at number one on both the Hot 100 and the Billboard Adult Contemporary chart.

== Percy Sledge original version ==
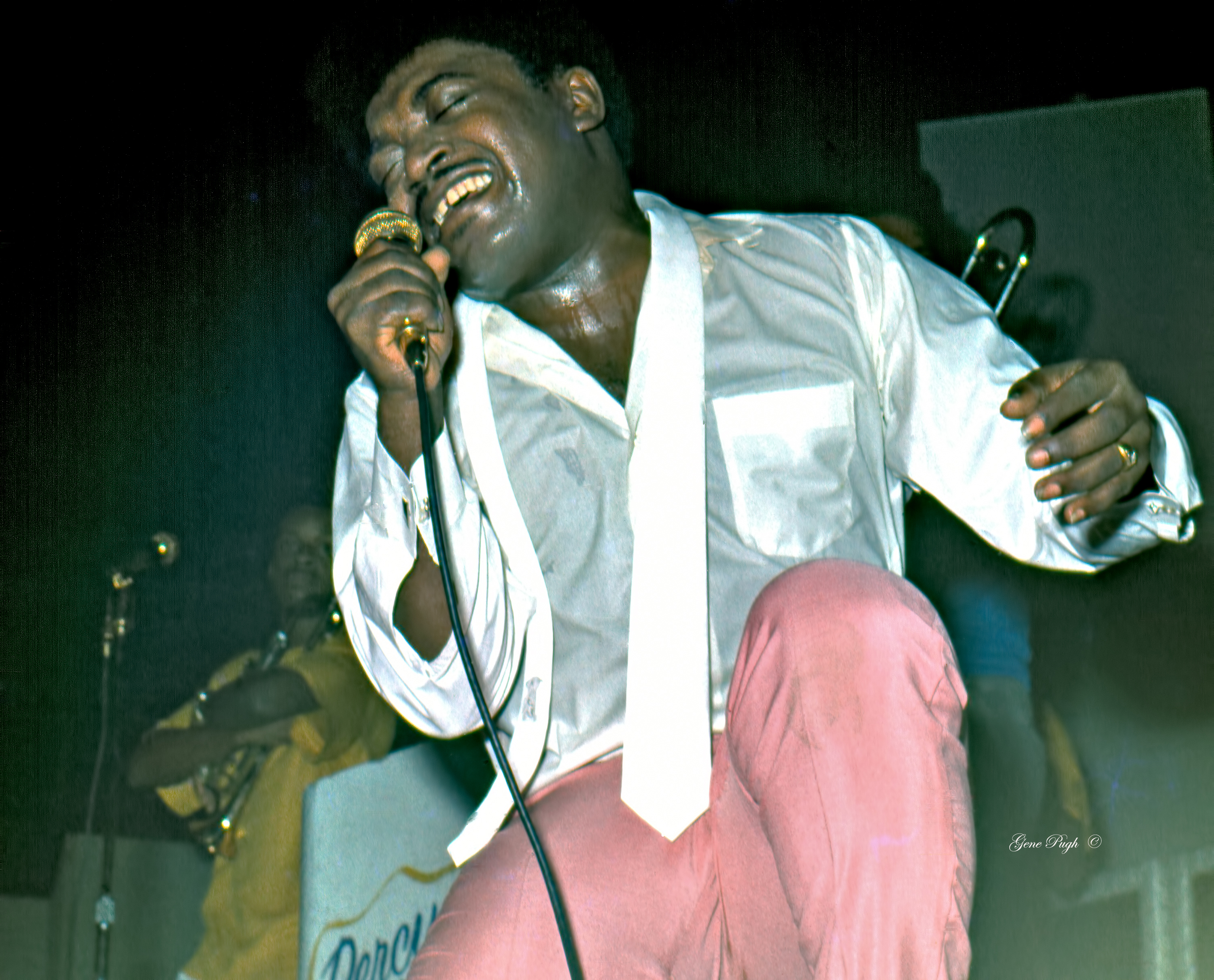
Percy Sledge, 1974

=== Background ===
According to Dan Penn, the song was initially recorded by Percy Sledge at Rick Hall's FAME Studios in Muscle Shoals, Alabama, before being re-recorded at the nearby Norala Studios owned by Quin Ivy. According to Ivy, Sledge was introduced to him by his friend Leroy Wright in Ivy's Tune Town record store. Wright convinced him to audition for Sledge and his band the Esquires.

The sidemen on the recording included Spooner Oldham on Farfisa organ, Marlin Greene on guitar, Albert "Junior" Lowe on bass guitar, and Roger Hawkins on drums. Also on the session were Jack Peck on trumpet; Billy Cofield and Don “Rim” Pollard on tenor saxophones; and backing vocalists Jerry Eddleman, Donna Jean Godchaux, Jeanie Greene, Sandy Posey, and Hershel Wiggington. Songwriters Andrew Wright and Calvin Lewis did not play on the record. Rick Hall arranged a distribution deal with Atlantic Records, but Jerry Wexler asked that the song be re-recorded because the horns were out of tune. According to musician David Hood, "They went back in the studio and changed the horns, got different horn players to play on it. But then the tapes got mixed up and Atlantic put out their original version. So that's the hit."

=== Reception ===
Released by Atlantic Records in April 1966, Sledge's recording reached number one on both the Billboard Hot 100 and R&B singles charts, becoming the first number 1 hit recorded in or around Muscle Shoals. It is also one of seven number 1 hits to debut on the Billboard Hot 100 at number 100. The single was also a top ten hit in the UK, reaching number four on its initial release and peaking at number two in a 1987 run on the UK Singles Chart after it was featured in a Levi's commercial. The Percy Sledge version is listed 53rd in Rolling Stone's 500 Greatest Songs of All Time. Also in 1987, it was reissued in the US to promote the soundtrack album for Platoon.

In 1999, Sledge's 1966 recording was inducted into the Grammy Hall of Fame.

=== Authorship ===
Calvin Lewis and Andrew Wright were members of the Esquires, a band in Sheffield, Alabama, fronted by singer Percy Sledge. According to Wright, "We were set to play a Friday night dance, and we were practicing ... I was messing around on the organ when this riff came up out of nowhere. There was no one in the club but us. I told Calvin to go home and write some words." The next night, they rehearsed the emerging song with Sledge, changed it around, and soon afterward auditioned the song for local businessman and radio DJ Quin Ivy. He liked the song but suggested that some of the words be changed to give a more positive message. Wright said, "We kept some of the phrases, worked on it for several weeks, and spent quite a bit of time in the studio."

Although the writing of the song is credited to Lewis and Wright, Sledge later said that he should have received a co-writing credit. In one story, Sledge said that one night he was upset over a broken relationship and asked Lewis and Wright to play a slow blues over which he improvised lyrics describing his emotions; Quin Ivy was at the show and asked the band to refine the lyrics so that it could be recorded. Sledge said that he allowed Lewis and Wright to take the writing credits because they gave him the opportunity "to sing his heart out".

In another interview, Sledge said:

When I wrote the song at first, it was called "Why Did You Leave Me Baby". And I changed it from that to "When a Man Loves a Woman". I just reversed it. Quin told me that if I was to write some lyrics around that melody and the expression I'd put into "Why Did You Leave Me Baby", he believed it would've been a hit record. He was one of the top disc jockeys at that time. Sure enough, he asked me if I had any lyrics for that. He said, "That's it! Write a story around that title! What a song that would be with that feeling you had!" It was a song that was meant to be. It wasn't just what I had done; it was the musicians, the producer, the background singers, the right time.

=== Charts ===
Chart (1966)	Peak position
Australia (Australian Music Report)	11
Canada Top Singles (RPM)	1
Belgium (Ultratop 50 Flanders)	8
Belgium (Ultratop 50 Wallonia)	4
Finland (Suomen virallinen lista)	21
France (SNEP)	3
Netherlands (Dutch Top 40)	12
Netherlands (Single Top 100)	10
Sweden (Kvällstoppen)	7
Sweden (Tio i Topp)	7
UK Singles (Official Charts)	4
US Billboard Hot 100	1
US Hot Rhythm & Blues Singles (Billboard)	1
US Cash Box Top 100	1
US Record World 100 Top Pops	1
West Germany (Media Control)	13

Chart (1987)	Peak position
Belgium (Ultratop 50 Flanders)	12
Finland (Suomen virallinen lista)	21
France (SNEP)	26
Netherlands (Single Top 100)	62
Switzerland (Schweizer Hitparade)	21
UK Singles (Official Charts)	2
West Germany (GfK)	13

=== Certifications ===
Region	Certification	Certified units/sales
United Kingdom (BPI)	Gold	400,000^{‡}
^{‡} Sales+streaming figures based on certification alone.

== Michael Bolton version ==
"When a Man Loves a Woman"

Single by Michael Bolton

from the album Time, Love & Tenderness
- B-side: "Save Me"
- Released: October 1991
- Genre: R&B
- Length: 3:52
- Label: Columbia
- Songwriters: Calvin Lewis; Andrew Wright
- Producers: Walter Afanasieff; Michael Bolton

Michael Bolton singles chronology
"Time, Love and Tenderness" (1991)	"When a Man Loves a Woman" (1991)	"Missing You Now" (1991)

=== Background ===
"When a Man Loves a Woman" was covered by singer Michael Bolton for his seventh studio album, Time, Love & Tenderness (1991). His version of the song reached number one on the US Billboard Hot 100, Cash Box Top 100 and Billboard Adult Contemporary charts, becoming Bolton's second US number-one hit. Bolton also received a Grammy Award for this song. This version has the distinction of being the last number-one song to chart on the old Billboard Hot 100 charting system that relied on sales and airplay reports before the charts switched to using Nielsen SoundScan statistics. With the Percy Sledge original having reached number one previously, Bolton's version made it the seventh song to top the Hot 100 as recorded by multiple artists.

=== Personnel ===
- Michael Bolton – lead vocals
- Walter Afanasieff – keyboards, Hammond organ, synthesizers
- John Beasley – piano
- Michael Thompson, Chris Camozzi – guitar
- Randy Jackson – bass guitar
- Jeff Porcaro – drums
- Jeanie Tracy, Kitty Beethoven, Claytoven Richardson, Sandy Griffith, Melisa Kary, Gary Cirimelli – background vocals

=== Charts ===
==== Weekly charts ====
Chart (1991–1992)	Peak position
Belgium (Ultratop 50 Flanders)	21
Canada Top Singles (RPM)	4
Canada Adult Contemporary (RPM)	1
Ecuador (UPI)	7
Europe (Eurochart Hot 100)	20
Europe (European Hit Radio)	4
France (SNEP)	34
Germany (GfK)	52
Ireland (IRMA)	12
Luxembourg (Radio Luxembourg)	4
Netherlands (Dutch Top 40)	14
Netherlands (Single Top 100)	17
New Zealand (Recorded Music NZ)	21
Portugal (AFP)	10
Sweden (Sverigetopplistan)	34
UK Singles (Official Charts)	8
UK Airplay (Music Week)	2
US Billboard Hot 100	1
US Adult Contemporary (Billboard)	1
US Cash Box Top 100	1

==== Year-end charts ====
Chart (1991)	Position
Canada Top Singles (RPM)	57
Canada Adult Contemporary (RPM)	26
US Cash Box Top 100	50

Chart (1992)	Position
Brazil (Crowley)	71
Canada Adult Contemporary (RPM)	96
US Billboard Hot 100	54
US Adult Contemporary (Billboard)	37
US Cash Box Top 100	30

=== Release history ===
Region	Date	Format(s)	Label(s)	Ref.
United States	October 1991	7-inch vinyl; cassette	Columbia	
Australia	October 28, 1991	CD; cassette	Columbia	
United Kingdom	October 28, 1991	7-inch vinyl; CD	Columbia	
Japan	November 1, 1991	Mini-CD	Sony	

== Other versions ==
Three versions have made the U.S. Billboard Hot Country Songs charts. One by John Wesley Ryles reached number 72 in 1976; Jack Grayson and Blackjack peaked at number 18 in 1981; and a rendition by Narvel Felts peaked at number 60 in 1987, representing his final chart entry.

In 1979, American actress and singer Bette Midler covered the song for the soundtrack of The Rose, which tells a fictionalized version of Janis Joplin's life story. Midler's version was released as a single the following year and peaked at number 35 on the Billboard Hot 100.

Canadian singer Luba covered the song for her 1987 album Over 60 Minutes with Luba. Luba's version peaked at number 6 on the RPM top singles chart and number 3 on the Adult Contemporary chart.

Australian rock singer Jimmy Barnes released a version of "When a Man Loves a Woman" as the lead single from his 1988 live album Barnestorming. Barnes' version peaked at number 3 on the ARIA Charts and number 11 on the Official New Zealand Music Chart's top singles list.

English singer Joe Cocker covered the song for the 1989 live album Soul Session Live, by "James Brown & Friends". Though not released as a single, Cocker's rendition was nominated for the Grammy Award for Best R&B Song in 1990.

== See also ==
- List of number-one adult contemporary singles of 1991 (U.S.)
