= Said I Loved You... But I Lied =

1993 single by Michael Bolton

Single by Michael Bolton

from the album The One Thing
- B-side: "Soul Provider"
- Released: October 22, 1993
- Length: 5:06
- Label: Columbia
- Songwriters: Michael Bolton; Robert John "Mutt" Lange
- Producers: Michael Bolton; Robert John "Mutt" Lange

Michael Bolton singles chronology
"Reach Out I'll Be There" (1992)	"Said I Loved You... But I Lied" (1993)	"Completely" (1994)

Music video
- "Said I Loved You... But I Lied" on YouTube

"Said I Loved You... But I Lied" is a song by American pop music singer Michael Bolton. The song was co-written and co-produced by Bolton and Robert John "Mutt" Lange. Released in October 1993, by Columbia Records, as the first single from his ninth album, The One Thing (1993), the single topped the American and Canadian adult contemporary charts, reached the top 10 in the United States and in three other countries, and was certified gold by the Recording Industry Association of America (RIAA).

The song earned Bolton a Grammy nomination in the category Best Male Pop Vocal performance at the 37th Grammy Awards. In 2011, Bolton performed a duet version of this ballad for his compilation album, Gems: The Duets Album, with Agnes Monica.

== Chart performance ==
"Said I Loved You... But I Lied" reached the US top 40 in November 1993 and eventually became Bolton's seventh and most recent top-ten hit on the Billboard Hot 100 when it peaked at number six in early 1994. The song also spent 12 weeks at number one on the Billboard Hot Adult Contemporary Tracks chart, the singer's eighth chart-topper on this listing. Outside the United States, the single peaked at number two on the Australian Singles Chart, number three on Canada's RPM 100 Hit Tracks chart, number four on Portugal's AFP chart, number 13 on the New Zealand Singles Chart, and number 15 on the UK Singles Chart. It also reached number one on Canada's RPM Adult Contemporary chart.

== Music video ==
The music video for "Said I Loved You... But I Lied" was shot in Phoenix, Arizona and Alstrom Point, Utah, and was directed by Rebecca Blake.

== Track listings ==
- 7-inch, CD, and cassette single
1. "Said I Loved You... But I Lied" – 5:06
2. "Soul Provider" – 4:26
- 12-inch and maxi-CD single
1. "Said I Loved You... But I Lied" – 5:06
2. "Soul Provider" – 4:26
3. "Time, Love and Tenderness" – 5:31
4. "You Send Me" – 3:59

== Charts ==
=== Weekly charts ===
Weekly chart performance for "Said I Love You... But I Lied"
Chart (1993–1994)	Peak position
Australia (ARIA)	2
Canada Retail Singles (The Record)	1
Canada Top Singles (RPM)	3
Canada Adult Contemporary (RPM)	1
Europe (Eurochart Hot 100)	22
Europe (European Hit Radio)	6
Germany (GfK)	51
Iceland (Íslenski Listinn Topp 40)	28
Ireland (IRMA)	16
Netherlands (Dutch Top 40 Tipparade)	18
Netherlands (Single Top 100 Tipparade)	11
New Zealand (Recorded Music NZ)	13
Peru (UPI)	3
Portugal (AFP)	4
UK Singles (Official Charts)	15
UK Airplay (Music Week)	29
US Billboard Hot 100	6
US Adult Contemporary (Billboard)	1
US Pop Airplay (Billboard)	8
US Cash Box Top 100	5

=== Year-end charts ===
1993 year-end chart performance for "Said I Love You... But I Lied"
Chart (1993)	Position
Canada Top Singles (RPM)	93
Canada Adult Contemporary (RPM)	96

1994 year-end chart performance for "Said I Love You... But I Lied"
Chart (1994)	Position
Australia (ARIA)	31
Brazil (Mais Tocadas)	27
Canada Top Singles (RPM)	20
Canada Adult Contemporary (RPM)	12
US Billboard Hot 100	32
US Adult Contemporary (Billboard)	3
US Cash Box Top 100	38

=== Decade-end charts ===
Decade-end chart performance for "Said I Love You... But I Lied"
Chart (1990–1999)	Position
Canada (Nielsen SoundScan)	6

== Certifications ==
Certifications and sales for "Said I Love You... But I Lied"
Region	Certification	Certified units/sales
United States (RIAA)	Gold	500,000^{^}
^{^} Shipments figures based on certification alone.

== Release history ==
Release dates and formats for "Said I Loved You... But I Lied"
Region	Date	Format(s)	Label(s)	Ref.
United States	October 22, 1993	7-inch vinyl; CD; cassette	Columbia	
United Kingdom	November 1, 1993	7-inch vinyl; CD; cassette	Columbia	
Australia	November 8, 1993	CD; cassette	Columbia	
Japan	November 11, 1993	Mini-CD	Sony	
