= Missing You Now =

1991 single by Michael Bolton

Single by Michael Bolton featuring Kenny G

from the album Time, Love & Tenderness
- Released: December 1991
- Length: 4:33 (album version); 4:40 (music video version)
- Label: Columbia
- Songwriters: Diane Warren; Walter Afanasieff; Michael Bolton
- Producers: Walter Afanasieff; Michael Bolton

Michael Bolton singles chronology
"When a Man Loves a Woman" (1991)	"Missing You Now" (1991)	"Steel Bars" (1992)

Kenny G singles chronology
"Theme from Dying Young" (1991)	"Missing You Now" (1991)	"Forever in Love" (1993)

Music video
- "Missing You Now" on YouTube

"Missing You Now" is a song by American singer-songwriter Michael Bolton. It was released in December 1991 by Columbia Records as the fourth single from his seventh album, Time, Love & Tenderness (1991), and features saxophone player Kenny G. The track was co-produced by Walter Afanasieff, who co-wrote the song with Bolton and Diane Warren.

"Missing You Now" entered the top 20 of the US Billboard Hot 100 chart, peaking at No. 12 in March 1992, and reached No. 1 on the Adult Contemporary chart for three weeks, Bolton's sixth song to do so and Kenny G's first. The song also reached No. 2 on the US Cash Box Top 100, No. 28 on the UK Singles Chart, No. 27 on the Irish Singles Chart, and topped the Canadian RPM 40AC (Adult Contemporary) chart. The music video for "Missing You Now" features actress Teri Hatcher, whom Bolton was reportedly dating at the time.

== Personnel ==
- Michael Bolton: lead vocals, songwriter, producer, arranger
- Diane Warren: songwriter
- Walter Afanasieff: songwriter, producer, arranger, keyboards, Moog bass, synthesizer, drums, percussion
- Louis Biancaniello: additional keyboards, drum programming
- Ren Klyce: Akai AX60, Fairlight CMI, and Synclavier programming
- Kenny G: soprano saxophone
- Michael Landau: guitars
- Claytoven Richardson, Jeanie Tracy, Kitty Beethoven, Sandy Griffith, Vicki Randle: background vocals

== Charts ==
=== Weekly charts ===
Chart (1992)	Peak position
Australia (ARIA)	61
Canada Top Singles (RPM)	8
Canada Adult Contemporary (RPM)	1
Europe (Eurochart Hot 100)	70
Ireland (IRMA)	27
Netherlands (Single Top 100)	84
UK Singles (Official Charts)	28
UK Airplay (Music Week)	26
US Billboard Hot 100	12
US Adult Contemporary (Billboard)	1
US Cash Box Top 100	2

=== Year-end charts ===
Chart (1992)	Position
Brazil (Crowley)	72
Canada Top Singles (RPM)	74
Canada Adult Contemporary (RPM)	9
US Billboard Hot 100	77
US Adult Contemporary (Billboard)	10
US Cash Box Top 100	38

== Release history ==
Region	Date	Format(s)	Label(s)	Ref.
United States	December 1991	7-inch vinyl; cassette	Columbia	
Japan	March 8, 1992	Mini-CD	Sony	
United Kingdom	April 27, 1992	7-inch vinyl; CD; cassette	Columbia	
Australia	June 22, 1992	CD; cassette	Columbia	
