= Time, Love and Tenderness (song) =

1991 single by Michael Bolton

Single by Michael Bolton

from the album Time, Love & Tenderness
- B-side: "That's What Love Is All About"
- Released: 1991
- Length: 5:31
- Label: Columbia
- Songwriter: Diane Warren
- Producers: Walter Afanasieff; Michael Bolton

Michael Bolton singles chronology
"Love Is a Wonderful Thing" (1991)	"Time, Love and Tenderness" (1991)	"When a Man Loves a Woman" (1991)

"Time, Love and Tenderness" is a song written by Diane Warren and performed by American recording artist Michael Bolton. Released by Columbia as a single from his seventh album of the same title (1991), the song reached number seven on the US Billboard Hot 100 chart, becoming Bolton's fifth top-ten single in the United States. It was also the singer's fourth song to top the Billboard Hot Adult Contemporary Tracks chart. Worldwide the song reached number four in Canada, number 27 in Sweden and number 28 in the United Kingdom.

== Critical reception ==
Pan-European magazine Music & Media wrote that "this ear-grabbing semi-ballad [...] will absolutely invoke a positive reaction from your audience."

== Personnel ==
- Michael Bolton – vocals
- Walter Afanasieff – synthesized bass, keyboards, synthesizers, drums, percussion
- Michael Landau – electric guitar
- Gary Cirimelli – Synclavier programming
- Ren Klyce – Akai AX60 and Fairlight CMI programming
- Greg "Gigi" Gonaway – timbales
- Kitty Beethoven, Larry Batiste, Sandy Griffith, Chris Hawkins, Jeanie Tracy, Michael Bolton – backing vocals

== Charts ==
=== Weekly charts ===
Chart (1991)	Peak position
Australia (ARIA)	111
Canada Top Singles (RPM)	4
Canada Adult Contemporary (RPM)	1
Europe (Eurochart Hot 100)	76
Europe (European Hit Radio)	6
Germany (GfK)	74
Sweden (Sverigetopplistan)	27
UK Singles (Official Charts)	28
UK Airplay (Music Week)	4
US Billboard Hot 100	7
US Adult Contemporary (Billboard)	1
US Cash Box Top 100	3

=== Year-end charts ===
Chart (1991)	Position
Canada Top Singles (RPM)	40
Canada Adult Contemporary (RPM)	8
Europe (European Hit Radio)	49
US Billboard Hot 100	62
US Adult Contemporary (Billboard)	22
US Cash Box Top 100	23
