= Claytoven Richardson =

American singer

- Born: Clayton D. Richardson; May 23, 1956 (age 70)
- Origin: Berkeley, California, U.S.
- Genres: R&B, pop, jazz
- Years active: 1979–present
- Labels: Prestige (1979–1980); MCA (1980–1982); Fantasy (1983–1984); Qwest (1985)
- Website: claytoven.com

Claytoven Richardson (born May 23, 1956) is an American singer, instrumentalist, producer, songwriter, and author. His musical career spans nearly three decades, during which he has been awarded several gold, platinum and multi-platinum awards.

== Early life, family and education ==
Clayton D. Richardson was born on May 23, 1956, in Berkeley, California.

Larry Batiste, a childhood friend (and later business partner), accidentally fused Richardson's given name with that of the composer Beethoven to form the name "Claytoven."

== Career ==
In 1979 Claytoven made his recording studio and recording artist debut as a part of the group Bill Summers and Summers Heat. The group recorded one album for Prestige Records and three albums for MCA Records. The group saw moderate success with the songs, "Call It What You Want" and "Jam The Box".

After Summers Heat, Claytoven went on to become a session musician with his first major start singing background vocals for producer Narada Michael Walden on the hit George Benson single "Kisses in the Moonlight". His second recording session was as a guest vocalist and background vocalist on the breakout album "Duotones" for saxophonist, Kenny G. He has since performed on numerous gold and platinum recordings featuring Tevin Campbell, Michael Bolton, Elton John, Peabo Bryson, New Kids on the Block, Ricky Martin, Whitney Houston, Mariah Carey, Jennifer Lopez, Aretha Franklin, Natalie Cole, Celine Dion, and many others.

After being in the music business for some time he realized a need to increase the pool of well trained professional vocalists. So in 2000 Claytoven also stepped into the role of teacher by founding the "Studio Training Workshop for Vocalists", a workshop designed to help aspiring singers pursue a career as a professional recording vocalist by bridging the gap between the academic and professional music worlds. He currently teaches this and other workshops at San Francisco State University Music/Recording Industry Program and for various other music programs across the country. He now works for the City of Oakland running a local teen center, Digital Arts and Culinary Academy (DACA), along with fellow co-director and musician Andrea President.

In his efforts to further create growth in the professional music community, Richardson penned the book The Professional Studio Vocalist (ISBN 1598632795). He has been involved with many educational and literary projects, yet he remains active as a session musician.

== Selected discography ==
=== Artist albums ===
Year	Title	Artist
1979	On Sunshine	Bill Summers & Summers Heat
1980	Call It What You Want	Bill Summers & Summers Heat
1981	Jam the Box	Bill Summers & Summers Heat
1982	Seventeen	Bill Summers & Summers Heat
1983	Private Eye	Private Eye
1985	Nside	Makoto

=== Session work ===
Year	Title	Artist
1982	Keep It Live	The Dazz Band
1983	Love for Love	The Whispers
1984	Tiggi Clay	Tiggi Clay
1986	While the City Sleeps...	George Benson
1986	Duotones	Kenny G
1986	Fizzy Qwick	Fizzy Qwick
1987	Whitney	Whitney Houston
1988	One Moment in Time	Whitney Houston
1989	Through the Storm	Aretha Franklin
1989	Stay with Me	Regina Belle
1989	So Happy	Eddie Murphy
1989	Night With Mr. C	Clarence Clemens
1989	A Collection: Greatest Hits...and More	Barbra Streisand
1990	I'm Your Baby Tonight	Whitney Houston
1990	It's Supposed To Be Fun	Lou Rawls
1991	So Intense	Lisa Fischer
1991	Time, Love & Tenderness	Michael Bolton
1991	Inner Child	Shanice
1991	Christmas	Stephanie Mills
1991	Can You Stop The Rain	Peabo Bryson
1992	Heaven and Earth	Al Jarreau
1993	Duets	Elton John
1993	Soul Dancing	Taylor Dayne
1993	The One Thing	Michael Bolton
1993	The Colour of My Love	Celine Dion
1994	Face The Music	New Kids on the Block
1995	A Very Fine Love	Dusty Springfield
1995	Take Me Higher	Diana Ross
1995	My Cherie	Sheena Easton
1995	Your Heart's in Good Hands	Al Green
1996	Soulful Strut	Grover Washington Jr.
1996	New World Order	Curtis Mayfield
1996	Miracle	Puff Johnson
1997	Butterfly	Mariah Carey
1997	Open Roads	Gary Barlow
1997	Junction Seven	Steve Winwood
1997	Open Roads	Kenny Loggins
1997	Sensational	Michelle Gayle
1998	In & Out of Love	Patti Austin
1998	These Are Special Times	Celine Dion
1998	A Rose Is Still a Rose	Aretha Franklin
1999	Marc Anthony	Marc Anthony
1999	On The 6	Jennifer Lopez
1999	Lara Fabian	Lara Fabian
2000	Sound Loaded	Ricky Martin
2001	Renaissance	Lionel Richie
2002	A New Day Has Come	Celine Dion
2005	Blue Highway	Angela Strehli
2010	Just Charlie	Charlie Wilson
2010	Soulsville	Huey Lewis & the News
2012	Yo	Roberto Fonseca
2013	Memphis	Boz Scaggs
2013	Sammy Hagar & Friends	Sammy Hagar
2015	Brown Eyes	Paris

=== Soundtracks ===
Year	Title
1987	Beverly Hills Cop II
1989	Everybody's All American
1992	The Bodyguard
1993	Mr Wonderful
1994	Street Fighter
1994	Jason's Lyric
1994	Crooklyn
1996	The Associate
1997	A Smile Like Yours
1997	Hercules
1997	In & Out
1997	The Hunchback of Notre Dame
1999	Our Friend Martin
2001	Snow Dogs
2005	Rent
