= Michael Bolton discography =

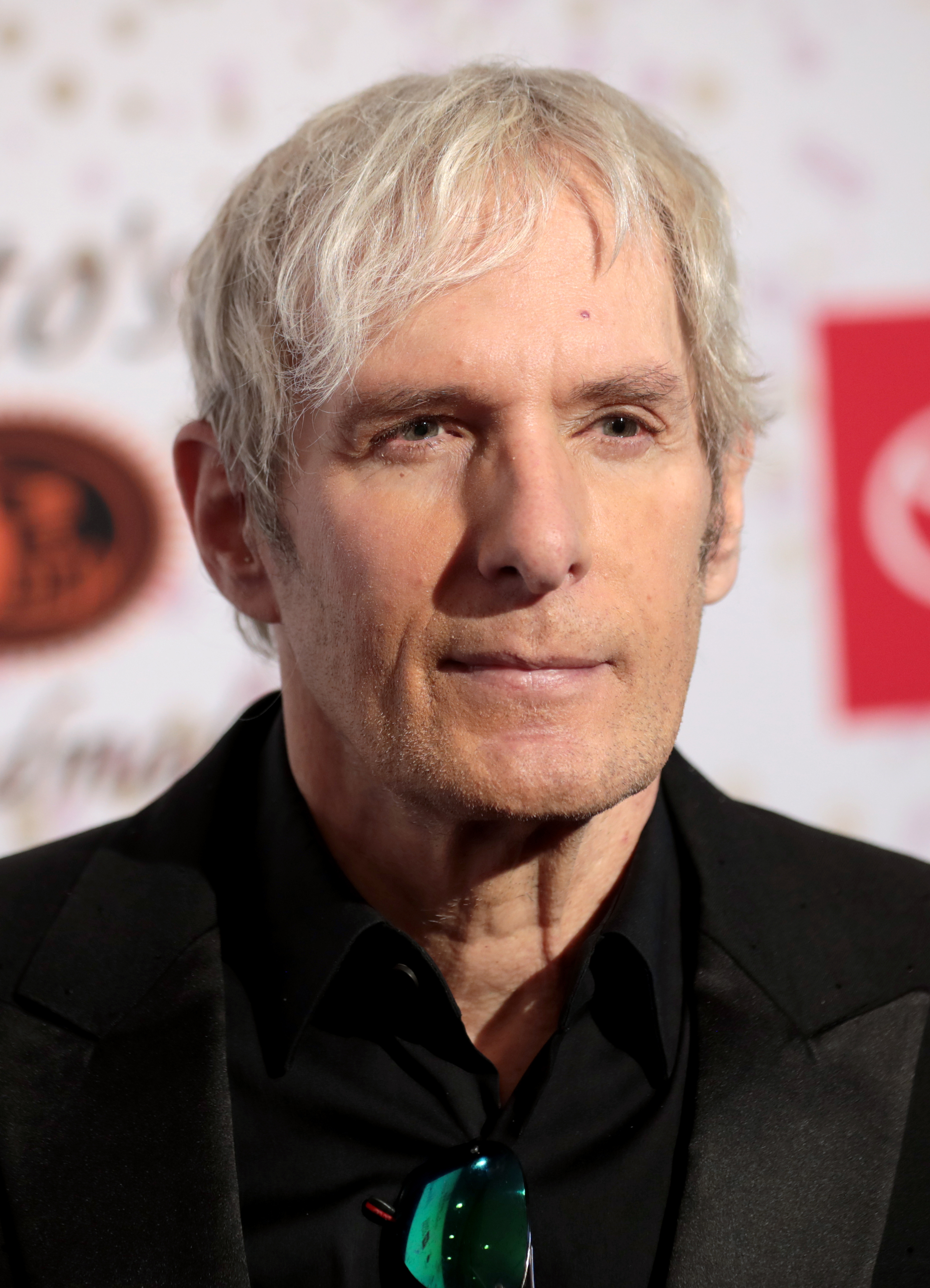
- Bolton in 2022
- Studio albums: 26
- Live albums: 1
- Singles: 35
- Number-one singles: 9*

This article presents the discography of American pop singer Michael Bolton. Since 1975, Bolton has released 26 studio albums and 35 singles. Regarded as the "King of Blue-eyed Soul", Bolton has sold 75 million records worldwide, making him one of the best-selling music artists in history. According to RIAA, Bolton has sold 28 million certified album units in the United States, including six multi-platinum records. Billboard ranked him as the 83rd Greatest artist of all time and has attained 9 No. 1 hits on US Adult Contemporary Chart.

Time, Love & Tenderness remains his biggest-selling album to date, with over 16 million copies sold worldwide. Bolton's second best-seller is Soul Provider, which attained 6× Platinum status in the US and over 12.5 million copies globally. Another big seller is Timeless: The Classics, an album of covers that reached 4× Platinum in the US and sold 7 million copies worldwide.

== Albums ==
=== Studio albums ===
| Year | Album details | Peak chart positions | | | | | | | | | Certifications (sales threshold) |
| Year | Album details | US | AUS | AUT | GER | NOR | NZ | SWE | SWI | UK | Certifications (sales threshold) |
|---|---|---|---|---|---|---|---|---|---|---|---|
| 1975 | Michael Bolotin: Release date: 1975; Label: RCA | — | — | — | — | — | — | — | — | — | |
| 1976 | Everyday of My Life: Release date: 1976; Label: RCA | — | — | — | — | — | — | — | — | — | |
| 1983 | Michael Bolton: Release date: 1983; Label: Columbia | 89 | — | — | — | — | — | — | — | — | US: Gold |
| 1985 | Everybody's Crazy: Release date: 1985; Label: Columbia | — | — | — | — | — | — | 45 | — | — | |
| 1987 | The Hunger: Release date: September 22, 1987; Label: Columbia | 46 | 34 | — | — | 10 | 42 | — | — | 44 | US: 2× Platinum; CAN: Platinum |
| 1989 | Soul Provider: Release date: June 26, 1989; Label: Columbia | 3 | 1 | 25 | 22 | 1 | 6 | 9 | 25 | 4 | WW: 12,500,000; US: 6× Platinum; AUS: 2× Platinum; CAN: 5× Platinum; NZ: Gold; UK: 4× Platinum |
| 1991 | Time, Love & Tenderness: Release date: April 23, 1991; Label: Columbia | 1 | 11 | 4 | 18 | 1 | 12 | 2 | 8 | 2 | WW: 16,000,000; US: 8× Platinum; AUS: Platinum; CAN: 7× Platinum; UK: 4× Platinum |
| 1992 | Timeless: The Classics: Release date: September 29, 1992; Label: Columbia | 1 | 2 | 25 | 42 | 10 | 9 | 14 | — | 3 | WW: 7,000,000; US: 4× Platinum; AUS: 2× Platinum; CAN: 4× Platinum; NZ: Gold; UK: 3× Platinum |
| 1993 | The One Thing: Release date: November 16, 1993; Label: Columbia | 3 | 1 | 28 | 5 | 13 | 4 | 8 | 13 | 4 | US: 3× Platinum; AUS: 2× Platinum; CAN: 3× Platinum; NZ: Platinum; UK: Platinum |
| 1996 | This Is The Time: The Christmas Album: Release date: October 1, 1996; Label: Columbia | 11 | 56 | — | — | — | — | — | — | 93 | US: Platinum; AUS: Gold; CAN: Platinum |
| 1997 | All That Matters: Release date: November 11, 1997; Label: Columbia | 39 | 100 | 30 | 70 | — | — | 56 | 42 | 20 | US: Gold; CAN: Platinum; UK: Silver |
| 1998 | My Secret Passion: The Arias: Release date: January 20, 1998; Label: Sony Classical | 112 | 63 | — | 44 | — | — | — | — | 25 | |
| 1999 | Timeless: The Classics Vol. 2: Release date: November 16, 1999; Label: Columbia | — | — | — | 85 | — | — | — | 80 | 50 | |
| 2002 | Only a Woman Like You: Release date: April 23, 2002; Label: Jive | 36 | 57 | — | 96 | — | — | — | 51 | 19 | |
| 2003 | Vintage: Release date: September 2, 2003; Label: Passion Group (US) UMTV / Universal (Europe) | 76 | — | — | — | — | — | — | — | 23 | |
| 2005 | 'Til the End of Forever: Release date: September 13, 2005; Label: Passion Group | 128 | — | — | — | — | — | — | — | — | |
| 2006 | Bolton Swings Sinatra: The Second Time Around: Release date: May 23, 2006; Label: Concord | 51 | — | — | — | — | — | — | — | 54 | |
| 2007 | A Swingin' Christmas: Release date: October 2, 2007; Label: Concord | — | — | — | — | — | — | — | — | 196 | |
| 2009 | One World One Love: Release date: September 21, 2009; Label: Universal Motown | 166 | — | — | — | — | — | — | — | 19 | |
| 2010 | Live at the Royal Albert Hall: Release date: May 3, 2010; Label: Universal Motown | — | — | — | — | — | — | — | — | — | |
| 2011 | Gems: The Duets Collection: Release date: June 21, 2011; Label: Montaigne / Legacy | 128 | 26 | 75 | 60 | — | — | — | — | 11 | |
| 2013 | Ain't No Mountain High Enough: A Tribute to Hitsville U.S.A.: Release date: February 26, 2013; Label: Montaigne | 38 | 79 | — | — | — | — | — | — | 19 | |
| 2017 | Songs of Cinema: Release date: February 10, 2017; Label: Frontiers | 177 | 81 | — | 90 | — | — | — | — | 46 | |
| 2019 | A Symphony of Hits: Release date: February 8, 2019; Label: Montaigne | 156 | 60 | — | — | — | — | — | — | — | |
| 2023 | Spark of Light: Release date: July 14, 2023; Label: Montaigne, Androver Music | — | — | — | 75 | — | — | — | 85 | — | |
"—" denotes releases that did not chart

=== Compilation albums ===
| Year | Album details | Peak chart positions | | | | | | | | | Certifications (sales threshold) |
| Year | Album details | US | AUS | AUT | GER | NOR | NZ | SWE | SWI | UK | Certifications (sales threshold) |
|---|---|---|---|---|---|---|---|---|---|---|---|
| 1993 | The Artistry of Michael Bolotin: Release date: March 23, 1993; Label: RCA | — | — | — | — | — | — | — | — | — | |
| 1995 | Greatest Hits (1985–1995): Release date: September 19, 1995; Label: Columbia | 5 | 6 | 13 | 8 | 6 | 8 | 13 | 16 | 2 | US: 3× Platinum; AUS: 2× Platinum; CAN: 3× Platinum; UK: Platinum |
| 2001 | Love Songs: Release date: February 6, 2001; Label: Columbia / Legacy | — | — | — | — | — | — | — | — | — | |
| 2002 | The Ultimate Collection: Release date: May 13, 2002 (Europe); Label: Columbia | — | — | — | — | — | — | — | — | — | |
| 2002 | Joy to the World: Christmas mini-album/EP; Release date: June 1, 2002; Label: Sony Music Special Products | — | — | — | — | — | — | — | — | — | |
| 2004 | Said I Love You... The Best of Michael Bolton: Release date: January 19, 2004 (Germany); Label: Sony | — | — | — | — | — | — | — | — | — | |
| 2005 | To Love Somebody – The Best of Michael Bolton: Release date: January 31, 2005 (Germany); Label: Sony BMG | — | — | — | — | — | — | — | — | — | |
| 2005 | The Essential Michael Bolton: Re-release of The Ultimate Collection; Release date: April 25, 2005; Label: Columbia / Legacy | — | — | — | — | — | — | — | — | — | UK: Silver |
| 2005 | The Very Best of Michael Bolton: Release date: October 15, 2005 (Europe); Label: Columbia / Sony BMG | — | — | — | — | — | — | 6 | — | 18 | |
| 2009 | Soul Provider: The Best of Michael Bolton: Release date: March 17, 2009 (Germany); Label: Camden Deluxe / Sony | — | — | — | — | — | — | — | — | — | |
| 2009 | The Ultimate: Release date: September 28, 2009 (UK); Label: Sony | — | — | — | — | — | — | — | — | 20 | |
| 2009 | Time, Love and Tenderness – The Best of Michael Bolton: Release date: November 23, 2009 (Germany); Label: Camden Deluxe / Sony | — | — | — | — | — | — | — | — | — | |
| 2019 | Gold: 3-CD budget compilation; Release date: November 8, 2019; Label: Crimson | — | — | — | — | — | — | — | — | 41 | |
"—" denotes releases that did not chart

== Singles ==
=== 1970s–1980s ===
| Year | Single | Peak chart positions | | | | | | | | | Album |
| Year | Single | US | US AC | AUS | CAN | IRE | NED | NZ | SWE | UK | Album |
|---|---|---|---|---|---|---|---|---|---|---|---|
| 1975 | "Your Love" | — | — | — | — | — | — | — | — | — | Michael Bolotin |
| 1976 | "If I Had Your Love" | — | — | — | — | — | — | — | — | — | Everyday of My Life |
| 1983 | "Fools Game" | 82 | — | — | — | — | — | — | — | — | Michael Bolton |
| 1985 | "Everybody's Crazy" | — | — | — | — | — | — | — | — | — | Everybody's Crazy |
| 1987 | "That's What Love Is All About" | 19 | 3 | 90 | 40 | — | 49 | — | — | 126 | The Hunger |
| 1987 | "(Sittin' On) The Dock of the Bay" | 11 | 19 | 3 | 9 | — | — | 8 | — | 77 | The Hunger |
| 1988 | "Wait on Love" | 79 | — | — | — | — | — | — | — | — | The Hunger |
| 1988 | "Walk Away" | — | 14 | — | 42 | — | — | — | — | — | The Hunger |
| 1989 | "Soul Provider" | 17 | 3 | 119 | 25 | — | 75 | — | — | 129 | Soul Provider |
| 1989 | "How Am I Supposed to Live Without You" | 1 | 1 | 2 | 8 | 2 | 3 | 10 | 9 | 3 | Soul Provider |
"—" denotes releases that did not chart

=== 1990s ===
| Year | Single | Peak chart positions | | | | | | | | | | Album |
| Year | Single | US | US AC | AUS | CAN | GER | IRE | NED | NZ | SWE | UK | Album |
|---|---|---|---|---|---|---|---|---|---|---|---|---|
| 1990 | "How Can We Be Lovers" | 3 | 3 | 3 | 2 | — | 18 | 38 | 27 | 10 | 10 | Soul Provider |
| 1990 | "When I'm Back on My Feet Again" | 7 | 1 | 77 | 2 | — | 20 | — | 35 | — | 44 | Soul Provider |
| 1990 | "Georgia on My Mind" | 36 | 6 | — | 16 | — | 29 | — | 38 | — | 94 | Soul Provider |
| 1991 | "Love Is a Wonderful Thing" | 4 | 1 | 25 | 2 | 40 | 23 | 44 | 12 | 16 | 23 | Time, Love & Tenderness |
| 1991 | "Time, Love and Tenderness" | 7 | 1 | 111 | 4 | 74 | — | — | — | 27 | 28 | Time, Love & Tenderness |
| 1991 | "When a Man Loves a Woman" | 1 | 1 | 100 | 4 | 52 | 12 | 17 | 21 | 34 | 8 | Time, Love & Tenderness |
| 1992 | "Missing You Now" (with Kenny G) | 12 | 1 | 61 | 8 | — | 27 | 84 | — | — | 28 | Time, Love & Tenderness |
| 1992 | "Steel Bars" | 16 air | 7 | 154 | 10 | 57 | 22 | — | — | — | 17 | Time, Love & Tenderness |
| 1992 | "To Love Somebody" | 11 | 1 | 39 | 2 | 61 | 13 | 35 | 32 | — | 16 | Timeless: The Classics |
| 1992 | "Drift Away" | — | — | 104 | — | — | 15 | — | 23 | — | 18 | Timeless: The Classics |
| 1992 | "Reach Out I'll Be There" | 73 air | 8 | — | 27 | 57 | — | — | — | — | 37 | Timeless: The Classics |
| 1993 | "Said I Loved You... But I Lied" | 6 | 1 | 2 | 3 | 51 | 16 | — | 13 | — | 15 | The One Thing |
| 1993 | "Soul of My Soul" | — | — | — | — | 53 | — | — | — | — | 32 | The One Thing |
| 1994 | "Completely" | 32 | 9 | 60 | 24 | — | — | — | — | — | — | The One Thing |
| 1994 | "Ain't Got Nothing If You Ain't Got Love" | 30 air | 13 | — | 16 | 98 | — | — | — | — | — | The One Thing |
| 1994 | "Lean on Me" | — | — | 60 | — | 51 | 21 | — | 36 | — | 14 | The One Thing |
| 1994 | "Once in a Lifetime" | — | 15 | — | 18 | — | — | — | — | — | — | Only You: Music from the Motion Picture |
| 1995 | "Can I Touch You...There?" | 27 | 9 | 18 | 7 | 57 | 15 | — | 22 | 27 | 6 | Greatest Hits (1985–1995) |
| 1996 | "A Love So Beautiful" | — | 13 | 61 | 77 | — | — | — | — | 55 | 27 | Greatest Hits (1985–1995) |
| 1996 | "Soul Provider" (re-issue) | — | — | — | — | — | — | — | — | — | 35 | Greatest Hits (1985–1995) |
| 1996 | "This River" | — | — | — | — | — | — | — | — | — | — | Greatest Hits (1985–1995) |
| 1996 | "I Found Someone" | — | — | — | — | 93 | — | — | — | — | — | Greatest Hits (1985–1995) |
| 1996 | "I Promise You" | — | — | — | — | — | — | — | — | — | — | Greatest Hits (1985–1995) |
| 1996 | "Love Is the Power" | — | 11 | 125 | — | — | — | — | — | — | — | This Is the Time: The Christmas Album |
| 1996 | "Fool for Love (Requiem pour un Fou)" (with Johnny Hallyday) | — | — | — | — | — | — | — | — | — | — | Single only release (France) |
| 1997 | "Go the Distance" | 24 | 1 | 104 | 26 | — | — | — | — | — | 14 | All That Matters |
| 1997 | "The Best of Love" | 65 air | 5 | 130 | — | — | — | — | — | — | 14 | All That Matters |
| 1998 | "Safe Place from the Storm" | — | 18 | — | — | — | — | — | — | — | — | All That Matters |
| 1998 | "Nessun dorma!" | — | — | — | — | — | — | — | — | — | — | My Secret Passion |
"—" denotes releases that did not chart

=== 2000s ===
| Year | Single | Peak chart positions | | | Album |
| Year | Single | US AC | AUS | UK | Album |
|---|---|---|---|---|---|
| 2000 | "Sexual Healing" | 28 | — | — | Timeless: The Classics, Vol. 2 |
| 2001 | "Whiter Shade of Pale" | — | — | — | Timeless: The Classics, Vol. 2 |
| 2002 | "Only a Woman Like You" | 5 | 108 | — | Only a Woman Like You |
| 2002 | "Dance with Me" | 21 | — | 102 | Only a Woman Like You |
| 2003 | "When I Fall in Love" | 17 | — | — | Vintage |
| 2005 | "Hear Me (Tears into Wine)" (with Jim Brickman) | 20 | — | — | Grace |
| 2006 | "'Til the End of Forever" | 32 | — | — | 'Til the End of Forever |
| 2006 | "The Second Time Around" (with Nicollette Sheridan) | — | — | — | Bolton Swings Sinatra |
| 2009 | "Just One Love" | — | — | 153 | One World One Love |
"—" denotes releases that did not chart

=== 2010s–2020s ===
| Year | Single | Peak chart positions | | | | | | | Album |
| Year | Single | US | US AC | AUS | CAN | NOR | SWE | UK | Album |
|---|---|---|---|---|---|---|---|---|---|
| 2010 | "Break Free" (with Irena Jarocka) | — | — | — | — | — | — | — | Małe rzeczy (re-release) |
| 2011 | "Jack Sparrow" (with The Lonely Island) | 69 | — | 64 | 54 | 2 | 6 | 133 | Turtleneck & Chain |
| 2011 | "I'm Not Ready" (with Delta Goodrem) | — | 29 | — | — | — | — | — | Gems: The Duets Collection |
| 2016 | "Song of Love for Lindsey" | — | — | — | — | — | — | — | |
| 2017 | "When a Man Loves a Woman" | — | — | — | — | — | — | — | Songs of Cinema |
| 2017 | "Old Time Rock & Roll" | — | — | — | — | — | — | — | Songs of Cinema |
| 2017 | "Stand by Me" | — | — | — | — | — | — | — | Songs of Cinema |
| 2019 | "How Am I Supposed To Live Without You" | — | — | — | — | — | — | — | A Symphony Of Hits |
| 2022 | "Beautiful World" | — | — | — | — | — | — | — | American Song Contest 2022 |
| 2023 | "Spark of Light" | — | — | — | — | — | — | — | Spark of Light |
| 2023 | "Just the Beginning" | — | — | — | — | — | — | — | Spark of Light |
"—" denotes releases that did not chart

== Music videos ==
| Year | Video | Director | Producer | Production company | Featured in |
|---|---|---|---|---|---|
| 1985 | "Everybody's Crazy" | Wayne Isham | Curt Marvis | The New Company | MTV standard rotation 1985–1987, Rodney Dangerfield's 1986 movie Back to School, and MTV's Beavis and Butt-head episode 142 "Green Thumbs" (October 11, 1995) |
| 1991 | "Love Is a Wonderful Thing" | Dominic Sena | Aris McGarry | Propaganda Films | The video was shown on Pop-Up Video episode 46 |
| 1991 | "Voices That Care" (Various) | David S. Jackson | —N/a | | |

== Other appearances ==
| Year | Song | Album |
|---|---|---|
| 1989 | "One More Time" | Sing: Original Soundtrack |
| 1989 | "Don't Make Me Wait for Love" | Kenny G Live |
| 1991 | "A Dream Is a Wish Your Heart Makes" | Simply Mad About the Mouse |
| 1991 | "Voices That Care" | Single (with various artists) |
| 1994 | "How Am I Supposed to Live Without You" (live version with Kenny G) | Grammy's Greatest Moments Volume II |
| 2011 | "Jack Sparrow" (with The Lonely Island) | Turtleneck & Chain |
| 2013 | "Afterwards (Bring Yo Friends)" (with Kid Cudi featuring King Chip) | Indicud |
| 2016 | "Incredible Thoughts" (with The Lonely Island featuring Justin Timberlake) | Popstar: Never Stop Never Stopping soundtrack |
