= When I'm Back on My Feet Again =

1990 single by Michael Bolton

Single by Michael Bolton

from the album Soul Provider
- B-side: "Walk Away"
- Released: 1990
- Length: 3:47
- Label: Columbia
- Songwriter: Diane Warren
- Producers: Michael Bolton; Guy Roche; Walter Afanasieff

Michael Bolton singles chronology
"How Can We Be Lovers" (1990)	"When I'm Back on My Feet Again" (1990)	"Georgia on My Mind" (1990)

"When I'm Back on My Feet Again" is a song by American singer-songwriter Michael Bolton, released in 1990 by Columbia Records, as the fourth single from his sixth studio album, Soul Provider (1989). The song was written by Diane Warren, who had based its lyricism and other elements on her emotions after the death of her father. She is quoted as saying that "the song wrote itself...I was thinking about my dad who had recently passed away, and it just came pouring out."

The song was produced by Bolton with Guy Roche and Walter Afanasieff. It peaked at No. 7 and 8 on the US Billboard Hot 100 and Cash Box Top 100 charts in August 1990, becoming Bolton's third top-10 hit in the United States. It also spent three weeks atop the Billboard Hot Adult Contemporary Tracks chart, Bolton's second No. 1 on this chart following "How Am I Supposed to Live Without You". Worldwide, "When I'm Back on My Feet Again" peaked at No. 2 in Canada, No. 20 in Ireland, No. 35 in New Zealand, No. 44 in the United Kingdom, and No. 77 in Australia.

== Credits and personnel ==
Musicians

- Michael Bolton: Main Vocal
- Chris Camozzi, Michael Landau: Guitars
- Neil Stubenhaus: Electric Bass
- Diane Warren: Keyboards
- Walter Afanasieff: Keyboards, Synthesized Bass, Drums, Percussion
- Louis Biancaniello: Additional Keyboard Programming
- Dan Shea, Ren Klyce: Additional Synth Programming

Production

- Arranged by Guy Roche
- Produced by Guy Roche, Michael Bolton and Walter Afanasieff
- Production Co-ordination: Doreen Dorian
- Recording Engineers: Guy Roche, Richard Piatt and Terry Christian; assisted by Kevin Becka and Tony Friedman
- Mixed by Mick Guzauski
- Published by RealSongs

== Charts ==
=== Weekly charts ===
Chart (1990)	Peak position
Australia (ARIA)	77
Canada Top Singles (RPM)	2
Canada Adult Contemporary (RPM)	1
Ireland (IRMA)	20
New Zealand (Recorded Music NZ)	35
UK Singles (Official Charts)	44
US Billboard Hot 100	7
US Adult Contemporary (Billboard)	1
US Cash Box Top 100	8

=== Year-end charts ===
Chart (1990)	Position
Canada Top Singles (RPM)	29
Canada Adult Contemporary (RPM)	25
US Billboard Hot 100	88
US Adult Contemporary (Billboard)	21

== See also ==
- List of Hot Adult Contemporary number ones of 1990
