= Over the Rainbow (2007 charity album) =

Compilation album by Various artists
- Released: 4 June 2007
- Recorded: Air Studios, London (3–4 April 2007); Metropolis Studios; Fleetwood Mobile Studios (1 April 2007)
- Label: Universal Classics and Jazz
- Producer: Tolga Kashif

Over the Rainbow is a charity album featuring show tunes recorded by various artists. It was released on 4 June 2007 by Universal Classics and Jazz. The album was conceived by Anneka Rice and produced by Tolga Kashif.

The making of Over the Rainbow was featured in a TV special of Challenge Anneka broadcast by ITV1 on 6 June 2007. £2 of every album sale went to the Association of Children's Hospices. The album launch included a concert held at the Chickenshed theatre featuring performances by children from hospices around the UK and artists featured on the album. The album peaked at no. 1 on the UK Compilation Chart.

== Background ==
Challenge Anneka is a British reality TV show in which presenter Anneka Rice is tasked with accomplishing a project, typically within a short time period, in aid of a charitable cause. The regular series aired between 1989 and 1995 on BBC1. The show was revived by ITV1 for two specials in 2006 and 2007. In March 2007, The Association of Children's Hospices challenged Rice to compile a studio album of newly recorded songs and hold a concert featuring live artists and a choir of children from various hospices around the UK. The album was put together in five days.

== Recording ==
Twelve of the thirteen tracks were recorded especially for the Over the Rainbow project. "New York, New York" by Michael Bolton is the only pre-existing recording, taken from his album Bolton Swings Sinatra: The Second Time Around (2006). McFly recorded their vocals for "You're the One That I Want" on the morning of 1 April 2007 within the Fleetwood Mobile studio in a hotel car park. All other tracks were recorded between 3 and 4 April 2007 at Air Studios.

== Track listing ==
| No. | Title | Writer(s) | Performer(s) | Length |
|---|---|---|---|---|
| 1. | "Somewhere Over the Rainbow" (from The Wizard of Oz) | Harold Arlen; Yip Harburg | Duncan James; Myleene Klass | 3:16 |
| 2. | "You're the One That I Want" (from Grease) | John Farrar | McFly | 3:09 |
| 3. | "Fly Me to the Moon" (from The Rat Pack) | Bart Howard | Jimmy Osmond | 2:08 |
| 4. | "The Way You Look Tonight" (from Swing Time) | Jerome Kern; Dorothy Fields | Curtis Stigers | 2:08 |
| 5. | "Climb Every Mountain" (from The Sound of Music) | Richard Rodgers; Oscar Hammerstein II | Lesley Garrett | 3:27 |
| 6. | "No Matter What" (from Whistle Down the Wind) | Andrew Lloyd Webber; Jim Steinman | Andrea Ross | 3:27 |
| 7. | "Consider Yourself" (from Oliver!) | Lionel Bart | Richard Fleeshman; The Cast of Avenue Q | 3:43 |
| 8. | "Secret Love" (from Calamity Jane) | Sammy Fain; Paul Francis Webster | Cerys Matthews | 3:41 |
| 9. | "Young at Heart" (from Young at Heart) | Johnny Richards; Carolyn Leigh | Gavin Creel | 2:46 |
| 10. | "I Don't Know How to Love Him" (from Jesus Christ Superstar) | Lloyd Webber; Tim Rice | Bonnie Tyler | 3:55 |
| 11. | "The Time of My Life" (from Dirty Dancing) | John DeNicola; Donald Markowitz; Franke Previte | Jermaine Jackson; Jocelyn Brown | 4:36 |
| 12. | "New York, New York" (from New York, New York) | John Kander; Fred Ebb | Michael Bolton | 3:22 |
| 13. | "Talk Through Me" (from The King's Web) | Paul Morrall; Jo Collins | Jo Collins; The Chicken Shed Choir | 3:38 |

== Charts ==
Chart performance for Over the Rainbow
| Chart (2007) | Peak position |
|---|---|
| UK Compilation Chart (Official Charts) | 1 |

== Personnel ==
Credits adapted from liner notes.

- Tolga Kashif – production, keyboards, programming
- Royal Philharmonic Orchestra (tracks 1, 3–11)
- The Rainbow Choir; Catherine Alexander, Nicko Anderson, Ceri & Bethany Astill, Kelly Atkinson, Jonathan Brook, Thomas Blumire, Lewis Cole, Fran Duff, Greg Fears, Charlie Marshall, Rhiannah Munday, Suzanna Ocansey, Sian Tolfree, Harvey Tye (track 1)
- Simon Hanhart – mixing
- Nick Wollage – orchestra engineer
- Tom Lewis – A&R
- Tony Dunne – artist coordinator
- Bekkie Sunley – product manager
- Peacock; Keith Peacock and Stuart Crouch – design and cover illustration
- Scott Wishart – photography
