= Vintage (Michael Bolton album) =

Studio album by Michael Bolton
- Released: September 2, 2003
- Studio: Bullseye Recording Studios (County Durham, UK); Passion Studios (Westport, Connecticut); The Gallery (East Hartford, Connecticut); The Hit Factory (New York City, New York); Barking Doctor Recording (Mount Kisco, New York); Criteria Studios (Miami, Florida); Noise In The Attic (Seal Beach, California)
- Genre: Pop
- Length: 36:06
- Label: Passion Group
- Producer: Michael Bolton; Rudy Pérez

Michael Bolton chronology
Only a Woman Like You (2002)	Vintage (2003)	'Til the End of Forever (2006)

Professional ratings
Review scores
Source	Rating
AllMusic	2.5/5 stars

Vintage is an album by Michael Bolton, released in 2003. The album debuted at No. 76 on the Billboard 200 chart and sold under 250,000 copies in the US.

== Track listing ==
1. "The Very Thought of You" (Ray Noble and His Orchestra cover) – 3:21
2. "All the Way" (Frank Sinatra cover) – 3:33
3. "A Kiss to Build a Dream On" (Louis Armstrong cover) – 3:02
4. "If I Could" (Ray Charles cover) – 3:08
5. "At Last" (Glenn Miller and his Orchestra cover) – 3:37
6. "When I Fall in Love" (Jeri Southern cover) – 3:19
7. "You Don't Know Me" (Eddy Arnold cover) – 3:14
8. "Smile" (Charlie Chaplin cover) – 3:18
9. "Daddy's Little Girl" (The Mills Brothers cover) – 2:12
10. "Summertime" (George Gershwin cover) – 4:32
11. "What Are You Doing the Rest of Your Life?" (Michael Dees cover) – 2:55
12. "God Bless the Child" (Billie Holiday cover; bonus track on Special Edition version) – 3:59

== Personnel ==
=== Performers ===
- Michael Bolton – vocals, rhythm track arrangements, string arrangements (4, 6, 8, 11)
- Clay Perry – acoustic piano, keyboard overdubs, rhythm track arrangements, string arrangements (4, 6, 8, 11)
- Michael Levine – acoustic piano
- Rick Krive – Hammond B3 organ
- Manny López – guitars
- Michael Thompson – guitars
- Dan Warner – guitars
- Julio Hernandez – bass
- Lee Levin – drums
- Ed Calle – saxophones
- Jason Carder – trumpets
- Rafael Ferro – string arrangements (1)
- Rudy Pérez – rhythm track arrangements, string arrangements (4, 6, 8, 11)
- Gary Lindsay – string arrangements (1, 4, 6, 8, 11), string conductor (1, 4, 6, 8, 11)
- Alfredo Oliva – concertmaster (1, 4, 6, 8, 11)
- Miami Symphonic Strings – strings (1, 4, 6, 8, 11)

=== Production ===
- Louis Levin – executive producer, management
- Michael Bolton – executive producer, producer
- Rudy Pérez – producer
- Steve Milo – recording
- Joel Numa – recording, mixing (3, 10)
- Clay Perry – recording
- Bruce Weeden – recording, mixing (1, 2, 4, 6, 8, 11)
- Mick Guzauski – mixing (5, 9)
- David Cole – mixing (7)
- Kent Hertz – assistant engineer
- Rick Howell – assistant engineer
- David Lopez – assistant engineer
- Steve Robillard – assistant engineer
- Bob Ludwig – mastering at Gateway Mastering (Portland, Maine)
- Ronnie Milo – production coordinator
- Mario Patiño – production coordinator
- Betsy Pérez – production coordinator
- Richard Corman – photography
- Jim deBarros – art direction
- Patrick Malloy – design
- Michael Skinner – additional artwork
- Gemina Aboitiz – stylist
- Dan Sharp – hair
- Gilles Grenier – set stylist
