= Only a Woman Like You =

Studio album by Michael Bolton
- Released: April 23, 2002
- Studios: Passion Studios and Le Crib Studios (Westport, Connecticut); Renegade Studios (Chicago, Illinois); The Gentlemen's Club (Miami Beach, Florida); Playroom Studios (Miami, Florida); Emerald Sound Studios and Ocean Way Nashville (Nashville, Tennessee); Headman Sound and Sound Decision Studios (New York City, New York); Barking Doctor Studios (Mount Kisco, New York); Final Approach (Encino, California); The Enterprise (Burbank, California); Conway Studios, Ocean Way Recording, Henson Recording Studios and Capitol Studios (Hollywood, California); The Treehouse (North Hollywood, California); Record Plant, Westlake Audio, The Village Recorder and Dig's Spot (Los Angeles, California); WallyWorld Studios (San Rafael, California); Noise In The Attic (Seal Beach, California); Polar Studios and Maratone Studios (Stockholm, Sweden)
- Genre: Pop
- Length: 55:31 (Japan Bonus Tracks release); 42:55 (Standard version release)
- Label: Jive
- Producers: Billy Mann; Gary Haase; Michael Bolton; Rudy Pérez; Max Martin; Rami; Robert John "Mutt" Lange; Andy Goldmark; Walter Afanasieff; Desmond Child; Richard Marx

Michael Bolton chronology
Timeless The Classics Vol. 2 (1999)	Only a Woman Like You (2002)	Vintage (2003)

Professional ratings
Review scores
Source	Rating
AllMusic	link
Entertainment Weekly	C+ link
People	(favorable) link
The Rolling Stone Album Guide	1.5/5 stars

Only a Woman Like You is an album by Michael Bolton, released in 2002. The album constituted a comeback for Bolton and peaked at No. 36 on the US albums chart.

== Track listing ==
1. "Dance with Me" (Bolton, Gary Haase, Billy Mann) – 3:30
2. "I Wanna Hear You Say It" (Bolton, Mann, Rudy Pérez) – 3:13
3. "Only a Woman Like You" (Robert John "Mutt" Lange, Shania Twain, Max Martin, Rami) – 4:07
4. "All That You Deserve" (Bolton, Andy Goldmark, Wayne Hector) – 3:41
5. "Love with My Eyes Closed" (Walter Afanasieff, Bolton, Mann) – 4:36
6. "To Feel Again" (Bolton, Gary Burr, Desmond Child) – 3:19
7. "The Center of My Heart" (Afanasieff, Bolton, Mann) – 4:49
8. "This Is the Way" (Bolton, Goldmark, Robert John "Mutt" Lange) – 3:36
9. "Simply" (Bolton, Goldmark, Mark Mueller) – 3:26
10. "Slowly" (Bolton, Dan Hill, Richard Marx) – 4:38
11. "I Surrender" (Bolton, Lange, Marx) – 4:01
12. "Eternally" (Bolton, Marx) – 4:46
13. "As" (Stevie Wonder) – 3:41
14. "All for Love"* version of Marcos Vianna's song "Somente Por Amor" (Vianna – Portuguese Lyrics and music, Bolton – English Lyrics) – 4:07; "O Clone" Original Soundtrack, Only released in Brazil.

== Personnel ==
Musicians

- Michael Bolton – vocals
- Gary "Headman" Haase – all other instruments (1), additional programming (1)
- Nemo – keyboard programming (2)
- Clay Perry – keyboard programming (2)
- Mark Portmann – keyboard programming (2)
- Henry Sommerdahl – grand piano (3)
- Chris DeStefano – keyboards (4, 8), bass (4, 8), drum programming (4, 8)
- Andy Goldmark – keyboards (4, 8, 9), bass (4, 8), drum programming (4, 8)
- C.J. Vanston – keyboards (4, 8), bass (4, 8), drum programming (4, 8), keyboard programming (10, 12), programming (13)
- Walter Afanasieff – keyboards (5, 7), bass (5, 7), drum programming (5, 7), rhythm programming (5, 7)
- Robert Conley – programming (5, 7)
- Paul Santo – keyboards (6), programming (6), guitars (6)
- Brett Laurence – keyboards (9)
- Richard Marx – keyboards (11), acoustic piano (12)
- John Blasucci – keyboard programming (11), drum programming (11)
- Richard Hilton – programming (13)
- Nataraj – programming (13)
- Paul Pimsler – electric guitar (1)
- Rudy Pérez – guitars (2)
- Ebsjörn Öhrwall – acoustic guitar (3), electric guitar (3)
- Johan Lindström – steel guitar (3)
- Michael Thompson – acoustic guitar (4), electric guitar (4, 10), guitars (8, 11, 12)
- Michael Landau – electric guitar (5)
- Ike Woods – guitars (6)
- Tomas Lindberg – bass (3)
- Rico Suarez – bass (6)
- Nathan East – bass (9)
- Todd Sucherman – drums (10)
- Rolando Morales-Matos – percussion (1)
- D. Lopez – percussion (5)
- Amir Sosi – tabla (8)
- Jan Bengtsson – flute (3)
- Snyko – strings (3)

Music arrangements

- Michael Bolton – arrangements (1, 4, 5, 7–11)
- Gary Haase – arrangements (1), track arrangements (1)
- Billy Mann – arrangements (1, 2), vocal arrangements (1)
- Rudy Pérez – arrangements (2)
- Henrik Janson – string arrangements (3)
- Ulf Janson – string arrangements (3)
- Andy Goldmark – arrangements (4, 8, 9)
- Walter Afanasieff – arrangements (5, 7)
- Paul Buckmaster – string arrangements (9)
- Richard Marx – arrangements (10–12)
- C.J. Vanston – arrangements (10, 12)

Background vocalists

- Michael Bolton – backing vocals (1, 2, 4–6, 8, 9)
- Nikki Richards – backing vocals (1)
- Mutt Lange – backing vocals (3)
- Marc Nelson – backing vocals (4, 8, 9)
- Skyler Jett – backing vocals (5, 7)
- Conesha Owens – backing vocals (5, 7)
- Claytoven Richardson – backing vocals (5, 7)
- Paul Santo – backing vocals (6)
- Richard Marx – backing vocals (10–12)
- Gene Miller – backing vocals (10, 11)

== Production ==
- Louis Levin – executive producer
- Michael Bolton – executive producer, producer (1, 2, 5–13)
- Gary Haase – producer (1)
- Billy Mann – producer (1, 2)
- Rudy Pérez – producer (2)
- Mutt Lange – producer (3)
- Max Martin – producer (3)
- Rami Yacoub – producer (3)
- Andy Goldmark – producer (4, 8, 9)
- Walter Afanasieff – producer (5, 7)
- Desmond Child – producer (6)
- Richard Marx – producer (10–12)
- Nile Rodgers – producer (13)
- Nataraj – co-producer (13)
- Jackie Murphy – art direction, design
- Nigel Parry – photography

=== Technical ===
- Chaz Harper – mastering at Battery Mastering Studios (New York, NY)
- Gary Haase – recording (1)
- Steve Milo – recording (1, 4–10, 12, 13), vocal recording (11)
- Andy Zulla – mixing (1, 2)
- Joel Numa – recording (2)
- Felipe Tichauer – recording (2)
- Bruce Weedon – recording (2), mixing (2)
- Robert Wellorfors – recording (3)
- Hakon Wollgard – recording (3)
- Kevin Churko – vocal engineer (3), vocal editing (3)
- Max Martin – mixing (3)
- Rami Yacoub – mixing (3)
- David Cole – recording (4, 8–13), mixing (8, 10–13)
- Chris DeStefano – recording (4, 8, 9)
- Frank Wolf – recording (4, 8, 9)
- Mick Guzauski – mixing (4, 5, 7, 9)
- Greg Bieck – recording (5, 7)
- David Gleeson – recording (5, 7)
- David Reitzas – recording (5, 7–10, 12)
- Jules Gondar – recording (6)
- Craig Lozowick – recording (6)
- Carlos Alvarez – mixing (6)
- Brett Laurence – recording (9)
- Matt Prock – recording (12)
- Richard Hilton – recording (13)
- Simon Simantob – recording assistant (2)
- Steve Genewick – recording assistant (4, 8)
- Jimmy Hoyson – recording assistant (4, 8, 12)
- Jason Rankins – recording assistant (4)
- German Villacorta – recording assistant (4, 8)
- Mike Zainer – recording assistant (4)
- Tom Bender – mix assistant (4, 5, 7, 9)
- Pete Krawiec – recording assistant (5, 7)
- Nicholas Marshall – recording assistant (5, 7, 8, 10, 12)
- Nick Thomas – recording assistant (5, 7)
- Conrad Golding – recording assistant (6)
- Dan Gomez – recording assistant (6)
- Greg Landon – recording assistant (6)
- Nathan Malki – recording assistant (6)
- Marcelo Marulanda – recording assistant (6)
- Jay Goin – recording assistant (8, 10, 12)
- John Hendrickson – recording assistant (8)
- Matt Marrin – recording assistant (9)
- Chris Trevett – additional post mixing (9)
- Grayson Sumby – recording assistant (12)
- Alan Ford – recording assistant (13)
- Darrell Herbert – recording assistant (13)
