= How Can We Be Lovers =

1990 single by Michael Bolton

- US retail cassette variant of standard artwork; the US CD edition was promo-only

Single by Michael Bolton

from the album Soul Provider
- B-side: "That's What Love Is All About"
- Released: 1990
- Length: 3:55
- Label: Columbia
- Songwriters: Michael Bolton; Diane Warren; Desmond Child
- Producer: Desmond Child

Michael Bolton singles chronology
"How Am I Supposed to Live Without You" (1989)	"How Can We Be Lovers" (1990)	"When I'm Back on My Feet Again" (1990)

"How Can We Be Lovers" is a song written by American singer and songwriter Michael Bolton, Diane Warren, and Desmond Child and performed by Bolton. Released in 1990 by Columbia Records as the third single from Bolton's sixth studio album, Soul Provider (1989), it peaked at numbers three and four on the US Billboard Hot 100 and US Cash Box Top 100, and number 10 on the UK Singles Chart in May 1990. The song also reached number two in Canada, number three in Australia, number nine in Luxembourg, number 10 in Sweden, and number 18 in Ireland.

== Track listings ==
- US and Australian 7-inch and cassette single; Japanese mini-CD single
1. "How Can We Be Lovers" – 3:55
2. "That's What Love Is All About" – 3:56
- UK 7-inch and cassette single
1. "How Can We Be Lovers" – 3:55
2. "The Hunger" – 4:18
- UK 12-inch single and CD1
1. "How Can We Be Lovers" – 3:55
2. "Fools Game" – 3:50
3. "The Hunger" – 4:18
- UK CD2
1. "How Can We Be Lovers"
2. "(Sittin' On) The Dock of the Bay" (live)
3. "The Hunger"
4. "I Almost Believed You"
- European 7-inch and mini-CD single
1. "How Can We Be Lovers" – 3:55
2. "Call My Name" – 4:15
- European mini maxi-CD single
1. "How Can We Be Lovers" – 3:55
2. "Call My Name" – 4:15
3. "Fools Game" – 3:50

== Personnel ==
- Michael Bolton – lead and background vocals
- Gregg Mangiafico – keyboards
- Bobby Chouinard – drums
- John McCurry – electric and acoustic guitar
- Hugh McDonald – bass guitar
- Eric Rehl – synthesizer
- Myriam Valle, Jon Fiore, Kyf Brewer, Kate McGunnigle, Joe Cerisano, Patty Darcy, Louis Merlino, Bernie Shanahan, Desmond Child – background vocals
- Sir Arthur Payson – engineer, mixing
- Joe Pirrera, Keith Goldstein, Roy Hendrickson, Danny Mormando, Mike Kowiak – assistant engineers
- John Herman – assistant mix engineer
- Steve Savitt – production manager

== Charts ==
=== Weekly charts ===
Chart (1990)	Peak position
Australia (ARIA)	3
Belgium (Ultratop 50 Flanders)	30
Canada Top Singles (RPM)	2
Canada Adult Contemporary (RPM)	11
Europe (Eurochart Hot 100)	28
Ireland (IRMA)	18
Luxembourg (Radio Luxembourg)	9
Netherlands (Dutch Top 40 Tipparade)	8
Netherlands (Single Top 100)	38
New Zealand (Recorded Music NZ)	27
Sweden (Sverigetopplistan)	10
UK Singles (Official Charts)	10
US Billboard Hot 100	3
US Adult Contemporary (Billboard)	3
US Cash Box Top 100	4

=== Year-end charts ===
Chart (1990)	Position
Australia (ARIA)	41
Canada Top Singles (RPM)	41
Sweden (Topplistan)	87
US Billboard Hot 100	52
US Adult Contemporary (Billboard)	34
US Cash Box Top 100	50

== Certifications ==
Region	Certification	Certified units/sales
Australia (ARIA)	Gold	35,000^{^}
^{^} Shipments figures based on certification alone.

== Release history ==
Region	Date	Format(s)	Label(s)	Ref.
United States	1990	7-inch vinyl; cassette	Columbia	
Australia	April 16, 1990	7-inch vinyl; cassette	CBS	
Japan	April 21, 1990	Mini-CD	CBS/Sony	
