= Chickenshed =

British theatre company

Coordinates: 51.64446°N 0.14521°W

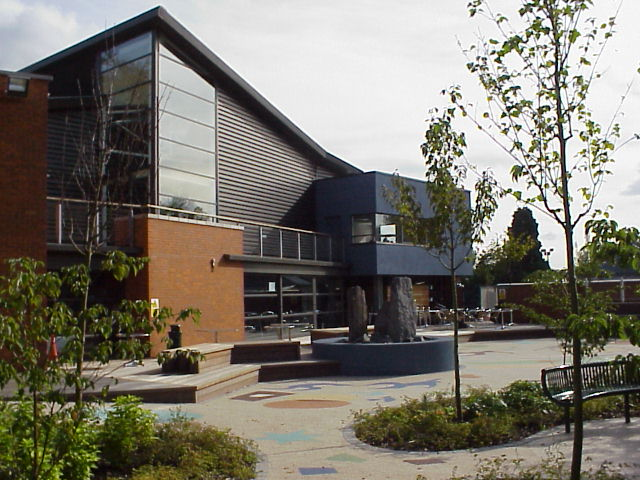
- Chickenshed Theatre
- Type: Charity
- Headquarters: Southgate, London Borough of Enfield, England, UK
- Website: https://www.chickenshed.org.uk/

Chickenshed (also known as Chicken Shed or the Chicken Shed Theatre Company) is a British theatre company based in Southgate in the London Borough of Enfield. It is registered as a charity under the name The Chicken Shed Theatre Trust.

== History ==
Chickenshed was founded by teacher Mary Ward and composer Jo Collins in 1974. Ward and Collins hosted their sessions in a disused chicken shed in Wrotham Park, gifted to them by local landowner Lady Elizabeth Byng. The theatre troupe went by The Lady Elizabeth Theatre Workshop for a while in her honour, but soon the name "Chicken Shed" stuck, and the former was dropped. In the 1980s, the group was joined by John Bull, who ran the local Cheviots Children’s Home, and went on to become their first Managing Director.

Chickenshed has a purpose-built theatre complex in Southgate, which opened in 1994 after a national-scale fundraising effort, supported by Judi Dench and Diana, Princess of Wales. The theatre has four performance spaces: The Rayne Theatre, which can seat up to 292 people, a smaller Studio Theatre, an Amphitheatre and a bar/restaurant that regularly hosts live music and comedy evenings.

In 1996, company founder Mary Ward was appointed MBE for services to the arts, followed in 1999 with a Creative Britons Award to acknowledge her 25 years of work with the theatre, while co-founder Jo Collins was appointed MBE in the 2001 New Year's honours for services to music. Chickenshed has performed at a number of public events, including Queen Elizabeth II's Golden Jubilee celebrations in 2002. A show to commemorate 100 years of J. M. Barrie's classic children's story Peter Pan was staged by the theatre company at the Albery Theatre in London in 2004 to raise funds for Great Ormond Street Hospital.

Since 2000, Chickenshed has established 19 'Sheds' in the UK, Finland, New York, Shanghai and two in Russia. These Sheds have been set up and trained by Chickenshed, but have then gone on to run independently, linked to Chickenshed by a shared vision of inclusive practice and philosophy.

Notable alumni of Chickenshed's membership and education courses include Jamie Demetriou, Miriam-Teak Lee and Natasia Demetriou.

== Education ==
Chickenshed present original productions for young children, families, and adults. Chickenshed's membership programme comprises four children's theatre groups and two youth theatre groups for young people aged 5 to 21 years. They hold weekly theatre workshops for children, young people and adults.

Over 200 students join Chickenshed's BTEC, Foundation Degree and BA courses every year.

== Music ==
The first musical writers for Chickenshed were Jo Collins and Anthony Filby, who together formed Colby Music, through which they published a collection of musicals that Chickenshed performed. The music team has since greatly expanded. In December 1997, Chickenshed released a single, entitled "I Am in Love With the World", performed by children from the theatre. At bookmaker's odds of 4/1, the song was one of the contenders to become the UK Christmas number-one single. However, it reached only No. 15 in the chart, remaining in the Top 75 for six weeks. The song was included on Diana, Princess of Wales: Tribute, a charity album recorded following the death of Diana, Princess of Wales. Diana had been the royal patron of the theatre, along with Judi Dench.

Late 2003 saw the release of The Chicken Shed Album, a compilation that marked the 30th anniversary of the theatre company. Contributors to the album included supporters of the organisation, such as singers Cliff Richard and Emma Bunton, and actors Bob Hoskins and Kenneth Branagh, as well as three tracks by Chicken Shed itself. Jo Collins and Chickenshed recorded a song, "Talk Through Me", for the 2007 show tunes album Over the Rainbow.

In 2023, Chickenshed auditioned for Britain's Got Talent, where they performed their own version of "Wonder" by Naughty Boy and Emeli Sandé. After their performance, Alesha Dixon pressed her Golden Buzzer, sending the group directly through to the semi-finals. Amanda Holden remarked, "It was amazing, the choreography was fantastic [and] you were all in sync", with Alesha adding, "I love every single thing that you stand for and what you represent [as] inclusivity is so important". In their semi-final, they performed "If You're Out There" by John Legend. Dixon described the group as "Incredible ambassadors for young people out there", with Bruno Tonioli adding, "This was a powerful message delivered straight from the heart". They failed to reach the final, however.

=== Discography ===
"Have A Heart At Christmas" (single, 1994)

1. "Have A Heart At Christmas"
2. "Rhapsody In Blue" (featuring Larry Adler)
3. "I'll Build A Stairway To Paradise" (featuring Larry Adler and Issy van Randwyck)

"I Am In Love With The World" (single, 1997)

1. "I Am In Love With the World"
2. "Don't Know If I Believe In Christmas"
3. "Little Tommy"
4. "Chicken Menace"

The Chicken Shed Album (album, 2003)

1. "Watch Me Come Alive" – Cliff Richard
2. "As Far as the Eye Can See" – Gabrielle
3. "I Am In Love With the World" – Chicken Shed
4. "Sometimes" – Emma Bunton
5. "The Wedding Dance" – Dmitry Sitkovetsky
6. "Can I Love Him?" – Sam Brown
7. "Bits and Pieces" – Bob Hoskins
8. "Trail My Soul" – Chicken Shed
9. "Looking For Love" – Richard O'Brien
10. "Will It Happen To Me?" – Barbara Dickson
11. "Elijah" – Kenneth Branagh
12. "First Love" – Chicken Shed
13. "Mad Little Sad Boy" – Kenneth Branagh
14. "Still Waters" – Misty Oldland
15. "We Need Each Other" – Elaine Paige
16. "Dream a We Real Yew" – Kenneth Branagh
