= This Is the Time: The Christmas Album =

This Is The Time: The Christmas Album

Studio album by Michael Bolton
- Released: October 1, 1996
- Studios: WallyWorld Studios (San Rafael, California); Capitol Studios and Ocean Way Recording (Hollywood, California); The Enterprise (Burbank, California); Passion Studios (Westport, Connecticut); The Bennett House (Franklin, Tennessee); Barking Doctor Recording (Mount Kisco, New York); Studio 33 (Hamburg, Germany)
- Genre: Pop
- Length: 43:34
- Label: Columbia
- Producers: Michael Bolton; Walter Afanasieff; David Foster; Johnny Mandel; Keith Thomas

Michael Bolton chronology
Greatest Hits (1995)	This Is The Time: The Christmas Album (1996)	All That Matters (1997)

This Is the Time: The Christmas Album is an album by Michael Bolton, released on October 1, 1996. Bolton's first Christmas release, it contains two new songs: "This Is the Time" (performed with Wynonna Judd), and "Love Is the Power", while the others were covers of traditional Christmas songs. "Ave Maria" was performed with Spanish tenor Plácido Domingo. "White Christmas" was a single off the album Timeless: The Classics, but was also included on this album. The CD was an "enhanced" CD containing additional material viewable on a computer, including a video of "White Christmas", a discography, and a preview of a Bolton CD-ROM which was never released.

The album was released during Christmas time, narrowly missing the top 10 hitting #11. In United States the album was certified platinum.

Professional ratings
Review scores
Source	Rating
AllMusic	link
Chicago Tribune	link
Entertainment Weekly	D link
The Rolling Stone Album Guide	1.5/5 stars

== Track listing ==
1. "Silent Night" (Franz Xaver Gruber, Joseph Mohr) – 4:06
2. "Santa Claus Is Coming to Town" (John Frederick Coots, Haven Gillespie) – 4:06
3. "Have Yourself a Merry Little Christmas" (Ralph Blane, Hugh Martin) – 4:02
4. "Joy to the World" (Lowell Mason, Isaac Watts) – 4:07
5. "Ave Maria" (with Plácido Domingo) (Traditional) – 4:42
6. "The Christmas Song" (Mel Tormé, Robert Wells) – 4:10
7. "O Holy Night" (Adolphe Adam, John Sullivan Dwight) – 4:54
8. "White Christmas" (Irving Berlin) – 3:44
9. "This Is the Time" (with Wynonna Judd) (Michael Bolton, Gary Burr) – 4:06
10. "Love Is the Power" (Walter Afanasieff, Bolton, Diane Warren) – 5:38

== Personnel ==
- Michael Bolton – vocals, arrangements (4, 8)
- Walter Afanasieff – keyboards (1, 4, 7, 10), Synclavier (1), additional programming (1), acoustic nylon guitar (1), arrangements (1, 7), additional bass (2), additional drum programming (2), horn arrangements (2, 4), Hammond B3 organ (4, 7), synth bass (4, 7), drum and rhythm programming (4, 7, 10)
- Dan Shea – keyboards (1, 2), synthesizer and Macintosh programming (1, 4, 7, 10), synth bass (1), drum programming (1, 2), arrangements (1, 5), acoustic piano (2), bass (2), rhythm programming (2), orchestra programming and performer (5), additional drum and rhythm programming (10)
- Mike McKnight – additional synthesizer and Macintosh programming (1), synthesizer and Macintosh programming (4, 7)
- Mike Lang – acoustic piano (3, 6)
- Ian Underwood – synthesizers (3, 6), acoustic piano (8)
- Randy Kerber – electric piano (8)
- Keith Thomas – acoustic piano (9), synthesizer programming (9), guitars (9), drum programming (9), arrangements (9), string arrangements (9)
- Phil Madeira – Hammond B3 organ (9)
- Dann Huff – guitars (1, 2, 4, 7), acoustic guitar (10), electric guitar (10)
- John Chiodini – guitars (3, 6)
- Jerry McPherson – guitars (9)
- Michael Landau – electric guitar (10)
- Dean Parks – acoustic guitar (10)
- Chuck Domanico – bass (3, 6)
- Byron House – bass (9)
- Sol Gubin – drums (3, 6)
- Mark Hammond – drum programming (9)
- Larry Bunker – vibraphone (3, 6), percussion (8)
- Dan Higgins – baritone saxophone (2), tenor saxophone (2)
- Marc Russo – tenor sax solo (2)
- Bill Reichenbach Jr. – trombone (2)
- Gary Grant – trumpet (2)
- Jerry Hey – trumpet (2), horn arrangements (2)
- Sam Bush – violin (9)
- The Nashville String Machine – strings (9)
- Ronn Huff – string arrangements (9), string conductor (9)
- Carl Gorodetzky – string contractor (9)
- Mariah Carey – arrangements (4, 7)
- David Foster – arrangements (8)
- Kitty Beethoven – backing vocals (2)
- Sandy Griffith – backing vocals (2)
- Conesha Owens – backing vocals (2)
- Claytoven Richardson – backing vocals (2)
- Jeanie Tracy – backing vocals (2)
- Placido Domingo – vocals (5)
- Wynonna Judd – vocals (9)
- Ada Dyer – backing vocals (9)
- Chris Rodriguez – backing vocals (9)
- Audrey Wheeler – backing vocals (9)

Orchestra (Tracks 3, 6)

- Johnny Mandel – arrangements and conductor
- Jules Chaikin – contractor
- Leland Bond, Elizabeth Finch, Rick Giovinazzo, Steve Juliani, Suzie Katayama, Frank Macchia and Fred Newman

Horns and Woodwinds

- Bob Efford, Gene Cipriano and Sam Karam – clarinet
- Valarie King, Fred Selden and Jim Walker – flute
- David Duke, William Lane, Mark Taylor and Brad Warnaar – French horn

Strings

- Robert Adcock, Ernie Ehrhardt, Anne Karam, Ray Kelley, Miguel Martinez and Daniel Rothmuller – cello
- Peter Doubrovsky, Arni Eglisson, Christian Kollgaard and Dave Stone – double bass
- Amy Shulman – harp
- Rollice Dale, Jerry Epstein, Peter Hatch, Laura Kuennen-Poper, Michael Ramos, Jimbo Ross, Harry Shirinian and Herschel Wise – viola
- Israel Baker, Mark Baranov, Mark Cargill, Isabelle Daskoff, Yvette Devereaux, Assa Drori, Brian Leonard, Yoko Matsuda, Irma Neumann, Donald Palmer, Bob Sanov, Marc Sazer, Eve Sprecher, Gerald Vinci, Elizabeth Wilson and Shari Zippert – violin

Orchestra on "White Christmas

- Johnny Mandel – arrangements and conductor
- Debbi Datz-Pyle and Patti Zimmitti – contractors
- Gerald Vinci – concertmaster

Horns and Woodwinds

- Donald Ashworth, Jon Clarke, Gary Foster, Dan Higgins, Marty Krystall, Jack Nimitz and Joel Peskin – woodwinds
- Jim Atkinson, Jeff DeRosa, Calvin Smith and Richard Todd – French horn

Strings

- Chuck Domanico, Edward Meares, Buell Neidlinger and Margaret Storer – bass
- Jodi Burnett, Larry Corbett, Ronald Cooper, Christine Ermacoff, Maria Fera, Paula Hochhalter, Anne Karam, Suzie Katayama, Dane Little, Frederick Sekoya and Tina Soule – cello
- Gayle Levant – harp
- Roland Kato, Donald McInnes, Cynthia Morrow, Carole Mukogawa, Kazi Pitelka, Harry Shirinian, Linn Subotnick and Ray Tischer – viola
- Dixie Blackstone, Mari Botnick, Russ Cantor, Isabelle Daskoff, Assa Drori, Henry Ferber, Michael Ferrill, Ronald Folsom, Armen Garabedian, Berj Garabedian, Harris Goldman, Gwenn Heller, Reginald Hill, Lisa Johnson, Norma Leonard, Michael Markman, Betty Moor, Irma Neumann, Donald Palmer, Claudia Parducci, Haim Shtrum, Robert Sushel, Gerald Vinci and Dorothy Wade – violin

Choir (Tracks 4 & 7)

- Walter Afanasieff – arrangements
- Mariah Carey – arrangements (7)
- Nicholas Bearde, Larry Batiste (7), Kitty Beethoven, Darlene Coleman, Tina Gibson, Cynthia Green, Sandy Griffith, Derick Hughes, Miffin "Dooney" Jones (7), Terrance Kelly, Conesha Owens, Anna Lisa Patterson, Claytoven Richardson, Brenda Roy and Jeanie Tracy – singers

== Production ==
- Michael Bolton – producer
- Walter Afanasieff – producer (1, 2, 4, 5, 7, 10)
- Johnny Mandel – producer (3, 6)
- Grace Row – vocal producer for Placid Domingo (5)
- David Foster – producer (8)
- Keith Thomas – producer (9)
- Barbara Stout – production coordinator (1, 2, 4, 5, 7, 10)
- Shaun Shankel – production coordinator (9)
- Louis Levin – direction
- Christopher Austopchuk – art direction
- Timothy White – photography

Technical

- Vlado Meller – mastering
- Tom Ruff – mastering
- Sony Music Studios (New York City, New York) – mastering location
- Dana Jon Chappelle – engineer (1, 2, 4, 5, 7, 10), vocal engineer (1, 2, 5, 7, 10), mixing (1, 2, 7, 10)
- David Gleeson – engineer (1, 2, 4, 5, 7, 10)
- Jan Fairchild – vocal engineer (1–7, 10)
- Dave Reitzas – vocal engineer (1, 2, 4, 5, 7, 8, 10), mixing (3), additional vocal engineer (3, 6)
- John Richards – engineer (3, 6), mixing (6)
- Mick Guzauski – mixing (4, 5)
- Ellen Fitton – vocal engineer for Placido Domingo (5)
- Tim Wood – vocal engineer for Placido Domingo (5)
- Al Schmitt – engineer (8), mixing (8)
- Billy Whittington – recording (9), mixing (9)
- Steve Milo – assistant engineer (3, 5–7)
- Kenny Ochoa – assistant engineer (3)
- Jeff Griffin – assistant engineer (4, 5, 10)
- Steve Kinsey – assistant engineer (4, 5, 10)
- Jen Wyler – assistant engineer (5)
- Dann Thompson – assistant engineer (6)
- David Hancock – assistant engineer (7)
- Shawn McLean – assistant engineer (9)
- Greg Parker – assistant engineer (9)
- Carry Summers – assistant engineer (9)

== Certifications ==
Region	Certification	Certified units/sales
Australia (ARIA)	Gold	35,000^{^}
Canada (Music Canada)	Platinum	100,000^{^}
United States (RIAA)	Platinum	1,000,000^{^}
^{^} Shipments figures based on certification alone.
