= Soul Provider =

Studio album by Michael Bolton
- Released: June 26, 1989
- Recorded: 1987–89
- Studios: Alpha Studios and Ground Control Studios (Burbank, California); Lion Share Studios, Lighthouse Studios, Homelands Studio and Studio Masters (Los Angeles, California); Criterion Studios, The Bunny Hop and Conway Recording Studios (Hollywood, California); The Plant (Sausalito, California); The Hit Factory, Right Track Recording, The Power Station, RPM Studios, Automated Sound Studios, Paradise Studios and Record Plant (New York City, New York)
- Genres: Pop, pop rock, soft rock
- Length: 47:04
- Label: Columbia
- Producers: Peter Bunetta; Rick Chudacoff; Michael Bolton; Desmond Child; Barry Mann; Guy Roche; Michael Omartian; Susan Hamilton; Walter Afanasieff

Michael Bolton chronology
The Hunger (1987)	Soul Provider (1989)	Time, Love & Tenderness (1991)

Singles from Soul Provider
- 1. "Soul Provider" Released: June 1989; 2. "How Am I Supposed to Live Without You" Released: October 1989; 3. "How Can We Be Lovers?" Released: January 1990; 4. "When I'm Back on My Feet Again" Released: April 1990; 5. "Georgia on My Mind" Released: July 1990

Soul Provider is the sixth studio album by American recording artist Michael Bolton. The album was released on June 26, 1989, by Columbia Records/CBS. The album has sold 12.5 million copies worldwide.

Containing five US top 40 hits (including three that reached the top 10), Soul Provider achieved longevity on the charts. The album spent almost four years on the Billboard 200 and peaked at number 3. It was certified 6× Platinum by the Recording Industry Association of America (RIAA).

For the single version of "Georgia on My Mind", CBS edited out Michael Brecker's saxophone solo and replaced it with one by Kenny G.

== Reception ==
Professional ratings
Review scores
Source	Rating
AllMusic	4/5 stars
Robert Christgau	C−
The Rolling Stone Album Guide	2/5 stars

Soul Provider has received generally mixed reviews from critics. AllMusic retrospectively described it as "more of the same", but noted that due to this album, Bolton "was now stoking the romantic fires in bedrooms across America". Robert Christgau gave the album a negative review, declaring Bolton to be "indistinguishable from pop metal except in the wattage of his guitar parts and the shamelessness of his song doctors." The Rolling Stone Album Guide described the album as the beginning of Bolton's descent into overdone and disrespectful covers, though they added that some of the self-penned performances on the album showed potential.

== Track listing ==
Soul Provider track listing
No.	Title	Writer(s)	Producer(s)	Length
1.	"Soul Provider"	Michael Bolton, Andrew Goldmark	Peter Bunetta and Rick Chudacoff	4:28
2.	"Georgia on My Mind"	Hoagy Carmichael, Stuart Gorrell	Bolton and Susan Hamilton	4:58
3.	"It's Only My Heart"	Bolton, Diane Warren	Michael Omartian	4:33
4.	"How Am I Supposed to Live Without You"	Bolton, Doug James	Omartian	4:48
5.	"How Can We Be Lovers?"	Bolton, Warren, Desmond Child	Bolton and Desmond Child	3:55
6.	"You Wouldn't Know Love"	Bolton, Warren	Bolton	3:54
7.	"When I'm Back on My Feet Again"	Warren	Bolton, Guy Roche, Walter Afanasieff	3:47
8.	"From Now On" (featuring Suzie Benson)	Bolton, Dean Pitchford, Eric Kaz	Bolton	4:07
9.	"Love Cuts Deep"	Bolton, Warren, Child	Bunetta and Chudacoff	3:49
10.	"Stand Up for Love"	Bolton, Barry Mann, Cynthia Weil	Bolton, Barry Mann, Omartian	4:44
11.	"Forever Eyes" (bonus track)	Bolton, Bob Halligan Jr.		4:23
Total length:				47:04

== Personnel ==
=== Musicians ===
- Michael Bolton – vocals, backing vocals (5, 6, 10, 11)
- Robbie Buchanan – keyboards (1, 8, 9)
- Brad Cole – keyboards (1, 9)
- Richard Tee – keyboards (2)
- Eric Rehl – additional synthesizers (2), synthesizers (5)
- Michael Omartian – keyboards (3, 4, 11), drums (3), synthesizers (10), backing vocals (10), drum programming (11)
- Gregg Mangiafico – keyboards (5)
- Walter Afanasieff – additional keyboards (5, 7), percussion (5), bass (7), drums (7)
- Phillip Ashley – keyboards (6), additional keyboards (8)
- Guy Roche – additional keyboards (6), arrangements (7)
- Diane Warren – keyboards (7)
- Barry Mann – keyboards (10)
- Dann Huff – guitars (1, 9)
- Steve Lukather – guitars (3, 11), guitar solo (11)
- Michael Landau – guitars (4, 8, 10), additional guitars (7, 11), lead guitar (6)
- John McCurry – electric guitar (5), acoustic guitar (5), rhythm guitar (6)
- Chris Camozzi – guitars (7)
- Schuyler Deale – bass (2)
- Neil Stubenhaus – bass (4, 6, 8–10), additional bass (7)
- Hugh McDonald – bass (5)
- Peter Bunetta – drum programming (1)
- Chris Parker – drums (2)
- John Keane – drums (4, 6, 8, 10)
- Bobby Chouinard – drums (5)
- John Robinson – drums (9)
- Paulinho da Costa – percussion (9)
- Kenny G – saxophone solo (1)
- Michael Brecker – tenor saxophone (2)
- Jerry Peterson – saxophone solo (9)
- Jeff Pescetto – backing vocals (1)
- Sharon Robinson – backing vocals (1)
- Leslie Smith – backing vocals (1)
- Terry Brock – backing vocals (2)
- Jocelyn Brown – backing vocals (2)
- Robin Clark – backing vocals (2)
- Milt Grayson – backing vocals (2)
- Vicki Sue Robinson – backing vocals (2)
- Fonzi Thornton – backing vocals (2)
- Richard Marx – backing vocals (3)
- Joe Turano – backing vocals (3, 6)
- Kyf Brewer – backing vocals (5)
- Joe Cerisano – backing vocals (5)
- Desmond Child – backing vocals (5)
- Patricia Darcy – backing vocals (5)
- John Fiore – backing vocals (5, 6)
- Kate McGunnigle – backing vocals (5)
- Lou Merlino – backing vocals (5)
- Bernie Shanahan – backing vocals (5)
- Myriam Naomi Valle – backing vocals (5, 6)
- Suzie Benson – vocals (8)
- Jeanette Hawes - backing vocals (9)
- Wanda Vaughn – backing vocals (9)
- Syreeta Wright – backing vocals (9)

=== Production ===
- Janet Hinde – production coordination (3, 4)
- Steve Savitt – production manager (5)
- Doreen Dorian – production coordination (7)
- Christopher Austopchuk – art direction
- Glen Erler – photography
- Louis Levin – direction, management

Technical

- Vlado Meller – mastering at CBS Records Studio (New York City, New York)
- Daren Klein – recording (1, 9)
- Mick Guzauski – mixing (1, 7, 8), remix engineer (4)
- Rick Kerr – engineer (2), mixing (2)
- David Albert – engineer (3, 4, 10, 11)
- Terry Christian – engineer (3, 4, 6–8, 10, 11), mixing (3, 4, 10, 11)
- Sir Arthur Payson – recording (5), mixing (5)
- David Frazer – remixing (5)
- Jay Healy – engineer (6, 8)
- David Thoener – mixing (6)
- Richard Piatt – engineer (7)
- Guy Roche – engineer (7)
- Arne Frager – remixing (7)
- Jeff Balding – additional recording (1, 9)
- Gerry E. Brown – additional recording (1, 9), mixing (9)
- Mark Ettel – additional recording (1, 9)
- Gary Wagner – additional recording (1, 9)
- Bryant Arnett – assistant engineer (1, 9)
- Laura Livingston – assistant engineer (1, 9)
- Richard McKernon – assistant engineer (1, 9)
- Marnie Riley – assistant engineer (1, 8, 9)
- Steve Satkowski – assistant engineer (1, 9)
- Tim Leitner – assistant engineer (2)
- Paul Logus – assistant engineer (2)
- Tony Van Horn – assistant engineer (2)
- Michael White – assistant engineer (2)
- Kevin Becka – second engineer (3, 4, 10, 11), assistant engineer (6, 7), additional engineer (8)
- Doug Carlton – second engineer (3, 4, 10, 11)
- Keith Goldstein – assistant engineer (5)
- Roy Hendrickson – assistant engineer (5)
- Mike Krowiak – assistant engineer (5)
- Danny Mormando – assistant engineer (5)
- Joe Pirrera – assistant engineer (5)
- John Herman – assistant mix engineer (5)
- Dary Sulich – assistant engineer (6, 8)
- Rich Travali – assistant engineer (6, 8)
- Tony Friedman – assistant engineer (7)

== Charts ==
=== Weekly charts ===
Weekly chart performance for Soul Provider
Chart (1989–1990)	Peak position
Australian Albums (ARIA)	1
Austrian Albums (Ö3 Austria)	25
Canada Top Albums/CDs (RPM)	5
Dutch Albums (Album Top 100)	5
Finnish Albums (Suomen virallinen lista)	32
German Albums (Offizielle Top 100)	22
New Zealand Albums (RMNZ)	6
Norwegian Albums (VG-lista)	1
Spanish Albums (AFYVE)	15
Swedish Albums (Sverigetopplistan)	9
Swiss Albums (Schweizer Hitparade)	25
UK Albums (Official Charts)	4
US Billboard 200	3

=== Year-end charts ===
1990 year-end chart performance for Soul Provider
Chart (1990)	Position
Australian Albums (ARIA)	10
Canada Top Albums/CDs (RPM)	18
Dutch Albums (Album Top 100)	56
New Zealand Albums (RMNZ)	14
US Billboard 200	3

1991 year-end chart performance for Soul Provider
Chart (1991)	Position
US Billboard 200	53

1992 year-end chart performance for Soul Provider
Chart (1992)	Position
US Billboard 200	89

=== Singles ===
Chart performance for singles from Soul Provider
Release date	Title	US Hot 100	US AC
June 1989	"Soul Provider"	17	3
October 1989	"How Am I Supposed to Live Without You"	1	1
March 1990	"How Can We Be Lovers"	3	3
May 1990	"When I'm Back on My Feet Again"	7	1
August 1990	"Georgia on My Mind"	36	6

== Certifications ==
Certifications for Soul Provider
Region	Certification	Certified units/sales
Australia (ARIA)	2× Platinum	140,000^{^}
Canada (Music Canada)	5× Platinum	500,000^{^}
Netherlands (NVPI)	Gold	50,000^{^}
New Zealand (RMNZ)	Gold	7,500^{^}
Spain (Promusicae)	Gold	50,000^{^}
Sweden (GLF)	Platinum	100,000^{^}
United Kingdom (BPI)	4× Platinum	1,200,000^{^}
United States (RIAA)	6× Platinum	6,000,000^{^}
^{^} Shipments figures based on certification alone.
