= My Secret Passion: The Arias =

Studio album by Michael Bolton
- Released: January 20, 1998
- Studio: Abbey Road Studios (London, England, UK); Passion Studios (Westport, Connecticut); Record Plant (Los Angeles, California); Sony Music Studios and The Hit Factory (New York City, New York)
- Genre: Opera
- Length: 36:33
- Label: Sony Classical
- Producer: Grace Row; Michael Bolton

Michael Bolton chronology
| All That Matters (1997) | My Secret Passion: The Arias (1998) | Timeless: The Classics Vol. 2 (1999) |

Professional ratings
Review scores
| Source | Rating |
|---|---|
| AllMusic | 2.5/5 stars |
| The Rolling Stone Album Guide | 3/5 stars |

My Secret Passion: The Arias is the first classical album by Michael Bolton featuring the Philharmonia Orchestra under the direction of Steven Mercurio. The album includes a duet with Renée Fleming.

Due to both a lack of substantial promotion and criticism that Bolton lacked the range to perform opera, the album peaked on the Billboard Top 200 at No. 112, marking the end of a period of chart success for Bolton.

== Track listing ==
1. "Pourquoi me réveiller?" from Werther by Jules Massenet - 2:57
2. "Nessun dorma" from Turandot by Giacomo Puccini - 3:14
3. "Una furtiva lagrima" from L'elisir d'amore by Gaetano Donizetti - 4:52
4. "M'apparì" from Martha by Friedrich von Flotow - 3:08
5. "Che gelida manina" from La bohème by Giacomo Puccini - 4:49
6. "O soave fanciulla" from La bohème by Giacomo Puccini (Duet with Renée Fleming) - 4:26
7. "Vesti la giubba" from Pagliacci by Ruggero Leoncavallo - 3:14
8. "E lucevan le stelle" from Tosca by Giacomo Puccini - 3:17
9. "Recondita armonia" from Tosca by Giacomo Puccini - 2:24
10. "È la solita storia" from L'arlesiana by Francesco Cilea - 4:42
11. "Celeste Aïda" from Aïda by Giuseppe Verdi - 3:38

== Credits ==
=== Production ===
- Michael Bolton – producer, vocal producer
- Grace Row – producer
- Dave Reitzas – vocal producer, vocal recording, mixing
- Rob Rapley – recording, editing
- Andrew Dudman – assistant engineer
- Steve Milo – assistant engineer, technical coordinator
- Alex Scanell – assistant engineer
- Jim Varvana – assistant engineer
- Brian Vipperts – assistant engineer
- Mark Rogers – technician
- Bob Whitney – editing
- Vlado Meller – mastering at Sony Music Studios
- Alison Booth – project coordinator
- Ronnie Milo – project manager
- Lisa Stevens – project manager
- Bill Schumann – vocal and diction advisor
- Danielle Orlando – diction advisor
- Richard Haney-Jardine – English translator
- Christopher Austopchuk – art direction
- Joel Zimmerman – design
- Tom Woodruff – Illustrations
- Sheila Metzner – photography
- Gemina Aboitiz – stylist
- Ashley Peterson – hair, make-up
- Louis Levin – direction
- Sharon Ainsberg – management for Louis Levin Management
- Julia Tiger – management for Louis Levin Management
