= 'Til the End of Forever =

Studio album with live tracks by Michael Bolton
- Released: September 13, 2005
- Recorded: Live portion recorded August 24–25, 2004
- Genre: Pop
- Length: 77:30
- Label: Passion Group
- Producer: Michael Bolton; David Grow; Gary Haase; Billy Mann; Steve Milo; David Reitzas; Joachem van der Saag

Michael Bolton chronology
The Essential Michael Bolton (2005)	'Til the End of Forever (2005)	Bolton Swings Sinatra (2006)

Professional ratings
Review scores
Source	Rating
AllMusic	3.5/5 stars

'Til the End of Forever is an album by Michael Bolton, released in 2005. The live cuts on this album were recorded during a DVD taping over two nights of concerts (August 24 and 25, 2004) at the Casino Rama, outside Toronto, Canada. The recording has been shown on the HDNet show "HDNet Concerts". A DVD of the concerts was released for sale in Europe in late 2005 and was released for sale in the U.S. in March, 2006, and was titled "The Best of Michael Bolton Live."

The track "Courage In Your Eyes" was written by Bolton as a tribute to Coretta Scott King, and he performed the song in her honor at her funeral. "Til the End of Forever" was the single off the album, and was written by Bolton in honor of his love for his three daughters. "Said I Loved You ... But I Lied" is a reggae-styled remake of Bolton's 1993 hit of the same name.

The album constitutes Bolton's lowest charting album in the US.

== Track listing ==
New studio recordings
No.	Title	Writer(s)	Producer(s)	Length
1.	"I'm Alive"	Billy Mann; Gary Haase	Billy Mann	3:46
2.	"Til the End of Forever"	Michael Bolton; Liz Sharpe	Dave Reitzas; Jochem van der Saag; Michael Bolton	4:44
3.	"Still the Love of My Life"	Bolton; Mann; Eric John Sanicola	Bolton	3:25
4.	"Next Lifetime" (with Liz Sharpe)	Bolton; Sharpe	van der Saag; Reitzas; Bolton	4:24
5.	"Hear Me (Tears Into Wine)" (with Jim Brickman)	Jim Brickman; Tom Douglas; Victoria Shaw	David Grow	3:59
6.	"Courage in Your Eyes"	Bolton	Gary Haase; Bolton	4:12
7.	"Said I Loved You...But I Lied" (Reggae Version)	Robert John "Mutt" Lange; Bolton	Steven Milo; Bolton	4:25

Live in concert
No.	Title	Writer(s)	Length
8.	"Time, Love and Tenderness"	Diane Warren	5:01
9.	"When a Man Loves a Woman"	Calvin Lewis; James Andrew Wright	4:19
10.	"Go the Distance"	Alan Menken; David Joel Zippel	4:57
11.	"Nessun Dorma"	Giuseppe Adami; Giacomo Puccini	3:34
12.	"Dock of the Bay"	Stephen Lee Cropper; Otis Redding	3:54
13.	"To Love Somebody"	Barry Alan Gibb; Robin Hugh Gibb	4:47
14.	"How Can We Be Lovers"	Bolton; Desmond Child; Warren	3:36
15.	"Love Is a Wonderful Thing"	Bolton; Andy Goldmark	4:50
16.	"Soul Provider"	Bolton; Goldmark	4:26
17.	"Steel Bars"	Bolton; Robert Dylan	4:25
18.	"How Am I Supposed to Live Without You"	Bolton; Douglas Thomas James	4:59

== Personnel ==
=== Studio Recordings ===
- Michael Bolton – vocals, backing vocals (1, 3), arrangements (2–4)
- Pete Wallace – keyboard programming (1), guitar programming (1), drum programming (1), arrangements (1)
- Liz Sharpe – acoustic piano (2, 4), backing vocals (2, 4), vocals (4)
- Joachem van der Saag – instruments (2, 4), orchestration (2), backing vocals (2, 4), arrangements (2, 4)
- Jim Brickman – grand piano (5), vocals (5)
- David Delhomme – keyboards (7)
- Michael Landau – guitars (2, 4)
- Chris Camozzi – guitars (7)
- Schuyler Deale – bass (7)
- Land Richards – drums (7)
- Sammy "Tre" Balfour – percussion (7)
- David Reitzas – arrangements (2, 4)
- Eric John Sanicola – arrangements (3)
- Gary Haase – arrangements (6)
- Billy Mann – backing vocals (1, 3), arrangements (1, 3)
- Janis Liebhart – backing vocals (7)
- Sylver Logan Sharp – backing vocals (7)
- Scott Mayo – backing vocals (7)

Technical

- Andy Zulla – mixing (1)
- David Reitzas – engineer (4), mixing (4)
- Joachem van der Saag – engineer (4), mixing (4)
- David Cole – recording (5)
- David Grow – recording (5), mixing (5)
- Steve Milo – recording (5, 7)
- Mick Guzauski – mixing (7)
- Nick Marshall – assistant engineer (2, 4)
- Jared Nugent – assistant engineer (2, 4)
- Ghian Wright – assistant engineer (2, 4)
- Tom Bender – assistant mix engineer (7)

=== Live Recordings ===
- Michael Bolton – lead vocals
- Brian Bec Var – keyboards
- David Delhomme – keyboards
- Jason Delaire – keyboards, saxophone, vocals
- Scott Mayo – keyboards, saxophone, vocals
- Chris Camozzi – guitars
- Schuyler Deale – bass
- Land Richards – drums
- Sammy "Tre" Balfour – percussion
- Janis Liebhart – vocals
