= All That Matters (Michael Bolton album) =

Studio album by Michael Bolton
- Released: November 4, 1997
- Recorded: 1996–97
- Studios: A&M Studios, Conway Studios and Brandon's Way Recording (Hollywood, California); Record Plant and Sierra Alegre Recording Studios (Los Angeles, California); Bananaboat Studios (Burbank, California); The Cave (Malibu, California); Larrabee North (Studio City, California); Soundcastle and Bindu Studio (Santa Monica, California); The Bennett House (Franklin, Tennessee); Masterfonics (Nashville, Tennessee); Right Track Recording, Sony Music Studios, Soundtrack Studios, Clinton Recording Studios, Quad Recording Studios and The Hit Factory (New York City, New York); East Bay Studios (Tarrytown, New York); Barking Dog Recording (Mount Kisco, New York); Studio LaCoCo and Doppler Studios (Atlanta, Georgia); Passion Studios (Westport, Connecticut)
- Genres: R&B, pop rock, adult contemporary, soft rock
- Length: 64:34
- Label: Columbia
- Producers: Walter Afanasieff; Michael Bolton; Barry J. Eastmond; Jamie Houston; Tony Rich; Guy Roche; Keith Thomas

Michael Bolton chronology
This Is The Time: The Christmas Album (1996)	All That Matters (1997)	My Secret Passion: The Arias (1998)

Professional ratings
Review scores
Source	Rating
AllMusic	2.5/5 stars
Entertainment Weekly	C−
The Guardian	2/5 stars
Los Angeles Times	1.5/4 stars
The Rolling Stone Album Guide	2/5 stars

All That Matters is the tenth studio album by American recording artist Michael Bolton, released in 1997 by Columbia Records, and was his first studio album since 1993's The One Thing. Bolton was aided in production by Babyface and Tony Rich, and among the songwriters are Bolton, Diane Warren, Babyface, Lamont Dozier, Gary Burr, and Tony Rich.

Bolton recorded the pop version of "Go the Distance" for the soundtrack to the animated film Hercules. The song was nominated for both the Academy Award for Best Original Song and the Golden Globe Award for Best Original Song, but ultimately lost both to Celine Dion's hit "My Heart Will Go On" from Titanic. "Go the Distance" peaked at #24 on the Billboard Hot 100 chart and went to #1 on the Hot Adult Contemporary Tracks chart, Bolton's ninth song to top this chart. The song was also included on the All That Matters album.

== Track listing ==
No.	Title	Writer(s)	Length
1.	"Safe Place from the Storm"	Michael Bolton, Diane Warren	5:22
2.	"The Best of Love"	Babyface, Bolton	4:19
3.	"Let's Make a Long Story Longer"	Bolton, Jamie Houston	4:39
4.	"A Heart Can Only Be So Strong"	Warren	5:02
5.	"Fallin'"	Tony Rich	3:47
6.	"Forever's Just a Matter of Time"	Bolton, Houston	4:28
7.	"Whenever I Remember Loving You"	Bolton, Gary Burr	4:26
8.	"Show Her the Way"	Bolton, Barry J. Eastmond	4:42
9.	"Why Me"	Babyface, Bolton, Lamont Dozier	4:36
10.	"Can't Get Close Enough to You"	Bolton, Eastmond, Houston	4:46
11.	"Let There Be Love"	Bolton, Houston	5:23
12.	"Pleasure or Pain"	Bolton, Rich, Warren	4:06
13.	"Go the Distance"	Alan Menken, David Zippel	4:40
14.	"When There Are No Words" (bonus track on the UK version)	Bolton, Antonio Jeffries	4:16

== Personnel ==
- Michael Bolton – vocals, backing vocals (1, 7), BGV arrangements (8, 10)
- Derek Nakamoto – keyboards (1–3, 6, 9, 11), keyboard arrangements (2, 3, 6, 9, 11)
- Guy Roche – programming (1), backing vocals (1)
- Walter Afanasieff – keyboards (4, 13), synthesizers (4), bass programming (4), drum programming (4), rhythm programming (4), synth bass (13)
- Dan Shea – additional keyboards (4, 13), additional drum programming (4), additional rhythm programming (4), computer programming (4, 13), sound designer (4)
- Tony Rich – keyboards (5, 12, 14), drums (5, 12, 14), backing vocals (5, 12, 14), bass (12)
- Keith Thomas – acoustic piano (7), synthesizers (7), bass and drum programming (7)
- Barry J. Eastmond – keyboard programming, (8, 10), drum programming (8, 10), BGV arrangements (8, 10)
- Eric Rehl – synthesizer programming (8, 10)
- David Gleeson – Synclavier programming (13)
- Michael Thompson – guitars (1)
- Dann Huff – guitars (2–4, 6, 7, 11, 13), electric guitar (12, 14)
- Dean Parks – guitars (2)
- Kevin Dukes – guitars (3)
- Michael Landau – guitars (4, 13)
- Peter Moore – acoustic guitar (5, 12, 14)
- Don Kirkpatrick – guitars (6)
- Jerry McPherson – guitars (7)
- Ira Siegel – guitars (8), acoustic guitar (10), electric guitar (10)
- Paul Jackson Jr. – guitars (9)
- Reggie Hamilton – bass guitar (2, 3, 6, 9, 11)
- LaMarquis Jefferson – bass guitar (5)
- Brian Borwell – drums (1)
- Rob Chiarelli – drum programming (2, 3, 6, 9, 11)
- Chad Cromwell – live drums (7)
- Mark Hammond – additional drum programming (7)
- Sammy Merendino – additional drum programming (8, 10)
- John Robinson – drums (13)
- Denny Weston Jr. – live percussion (2, 3, 9, 11), live drums (3)
- Terry McMillan – percussion (7)
- Bashiri Johnson – percussion (8, 10)
- Jeremy Lubbock – orchestra arrangement and conductor (13)
- Jesse Levy – orchestra contractor (13)
- Valerie Davis – backing vocals (1)
- Marc Nelson – backing vocals (1, 2, 6, 8, 9)
- Bob Bailey – backing vocals (3)
- Kim Fleming – backing vocals (3)
- Vicki Hampton – backing vocals (3)
- Jamie Houston – backing vocals (3, 9)
- Alex Brown – backing vocals (4)
- Lynn Davis – backing vocals (4)
- Jim Gilstrap – backing vocals (4)
- Phillip Ingram – backing vocals (4)
- Gary Burr – backing vocals (7)
- Lisa Cochran – backing vocals (7)
- Tim Davis – backing vocals (7)
- Sharon Bryant-Gallowey – backing vocals (8, 10)
- Cindy Mizelle – backing vocals (8, 10)
- Audrey Wheeler – backing vocals (8, 10)
- Gordon Chambers – backing vocals (10)
- Philip D. Hunter – backing vocals (11)
- Jean McClain – backing vocals (11)
- Pam Trotter – backing vocals (11)
- Sandy Griffith – backing vocals (13)
- Claytoven Richardson – backing vocals (13)
- Jeanie Tracy – backing vocals (13)
- Tumeko Allen – additional backing vocals (14)

== Production ==
- Louis Levin – executive producer, direction
- Michael Bolton – executive producer, producer, arrangements
- Guy Roche – producer and arrangements (1)
- Jamie Houston – producer and arrangements (2, 3, 6, 9, 11)
- Walter Afanasieff – producer and arrangements (4, 13)
- Tony Rich – producer and arrangements (5, 12, 14)
- Keith Thomas – producer and arrangements (7)
- Barry J. Eastmond – producer and arrangements (8, 10)
- Ronnie Milo – production coordinator
- Barbara Stout – production coordinator (4, 13)
- Pat Dorn – production coordinator (2, 3, 6, 9, 11)
- Kim Gorham – production coordinator (2, 3, 6, 9, 11)
- Irma McLeod – production coordinator (2, 3, 6, 9, 11)
- Shaun Shankel – production coordinator (7)
- Marie Eastmond – production coordinator (8, 10)
- Christopher Austopchuk – art direction
- Kerstin Bach – design
- Naomi Kaltman – photography
- Mel Rau – make-up
- Chris McMillan – hair stylist
- Gemina Aboitiz – wardrobe stylist
- Sharon Ainsburg – management for Louis Levin Management
- Jill Tiger – management for Louis Levin Management

Technical

- Bob Ludwig – mastering at Gateway Mastering (Portland, Maine)
- Dave Reiztas – recording engineer, mixing (4, 5, 10)
- Mario Luccy – engineer (1)
- Steve Milo – engineer (1, 3–12, 14), assistant engineer (2, 13)
- Michael Scott Reiter – engineer (1–3, 6, 8–12), mixing (3, 6, 11)
- Thom Russo – engineer (1)
- Moana Suchard – engineer (1, 6, 12), assistant engineer (1)
- Mick Guzauski – mixing (1, 8, 13, 14)
- Jeff Balding – engineer (2, 4, 6, 12)
- Jon Gass – mixing (2, 12)
- David Gleeson – engineer (4), additional engineer (7, 13)
- John Frye – engineer (5, 12, 14)
- Bill Whittington – engineer (7), mixing (7)
- Barry J. Eastmond – engineer (8, 10)
- Mark Partis – engineer (8, 10)
- Rob Chiarelli – mixing (9)
- Dana Jon Chappelle – engineer (13)
- John Kurlander – orchestra engineer (13)
- Mike Baumgartner – assistant engineer (1, 6, 12)
- Tom Bender – assistant engineer (1, 8)
- John Mooney – assistant engineer (1)
- Dave Reed – assistant engineer (1–3, 6, 9, 11)
- John Aguto – assistant engineer (2, 3, 6, 8–11, 14)
- Kyle Bess – assistant engineer (2)
- Phil Blackman – assistant engineer (2, 3, 6, 9, 11)
- Errin Familia – assistant engineer (2, 3, 6, 9, 11)
- Mark Hagen – assistant engineer (2, 4, 6, 12
- Aaron Lepley – assistant engineer (2, 3, 11)
- Shawn McLean – assistant engineer (2)
- Mike Rew – assistant engineer (3, 6)
- John Saylor – assistant engineer (3, 11)
- Steve Brawley – assistant engineer (4)
- Tyson Leeper – assistant engineer (4)
- Greg Parker – assistant engineer (7)
- Shaun Shankel – digital editing (7)
- Jason Goldstein – assistant engineer (8, 10, 11)
- Brian Vieberts – assistant engineer (8, 10)
- Steve Durkee – assistant engineer (9)
- James Saez – assistant engineer (10)
- Tim Lauber – assistant engineer (11)
- Greg Gasparino – assistant engineer (13)
- Bill Kinsley – assistant engineer (13)
- Glen Marchese – assistant engineer (13)
- Chris Theis – assistant engineer (13)

== Charts ==
Chart performance for All That Matters
Chart (1997)	Peak position
Australian Albums (ARIA)	100
Austrian Albums (Ö3 Austria)	30
German Albums (Offizielle Top 100)	70
Swedish Albums (Sverigetopplistan)	56
Swiss Albums (Schweizer Hitparade)	42
UK Albums (Official Charts)	20
US Billboard 200	39

== Certifications ==
Region	Certification	Certified units/sales
Canada (Music Canada)	Platinum	100,000^{^}
Spain (Promusicae)	Gold	50,000^{^}
United Kingdom (BPI)	Gold	100,000^{^}
United States (RIAA)	Gold	500,000^{^}
^{^} Shipments figures based on certification alone.
