= Timeless: The Classics Vol. 2 =

Studio album by Michael Bolton
- Released: November 16, 1999
- Studio: A&M Studios (Hollywood, California); Enterprise Studios (Burbank, California); Emerald Entertainment (Nashville, Tennessee); Passion Studios (Westport, Connecticut); Right Track Recording (New York City, New York); Barking Doctor Studios (Mount Kisco, New York)
- Genre: Blue-eyed soul
- Length: 50:31
- Label: Columbia
- Producer: Michael Bolton; Phil Ramone; Barry Beckett

Michael Bolton chronology
My Secret Passion: The Arias (1998)	Timeless: The Classics Vol. 2 (1999)	Only a Woman Like You (2002)

Professional ratings
Review scores
Source	Rating
AllMusic	link
Los Angeles Times	link
The Rolling Stone Album Guide	1/5 stars

Timeless: The Classics Vol. 2 is an album of covers by Michael Bolton, released in 1999.

The album is a follow-up to Bolton's 1992 covers album Timeless: The Classics. Unlike that album, however, which reached #1 and ultimately sold over 9 million copies, Vol. 2 failed to chart altogether on the Top 200, becoming Bolton's first album to not chart since 1985's Everybody's Crazy.

== Track listing ==
"Warm and Tender Love" was not included on American releases of the album, which makes "Whiter Shade of Pale" the eleventh and final track on that edition.

Track listing
No.	Title	Writer(s)	Original artist	Length
1.	"Sexual Healing"	Marvin Gaye, Odell Brown, David Ritz	Marvin Gaye	4:37
2.	"Tired of Being Alone"	Al Green	Al Green	3:54
3.	"Let's Stay Together"	Al Green, Willie Mitchell, Al Jackson, Jr.	Al Green	4:29
4.	"My Girl"	Smokey Robinson, Ronald White	The Temptations	3:22
5.	"Ain't No Sunshine"	Bill Withers	Bill Withers	3:34
6.	"(What A) Wonderful World"	Sam Cooke, Lou Adler, Herb Alpert	Sam Cooke	4:05
7.	"Like a Rolling Stone"	Bob Dylan	Bob Dylan	4:51
8.	"I Can't Stand the Rain"	Ann Peebles, Don Bryant, Bernard Miller	Ann Peebles	3:43
9.	"Try a Little Tenderness"	Jimmy Campbell, Reg Connelly, Harry M. Woods	Ray Noble	4:47
10.	"What You Won't Do For Love"	Bobby Caldwell, Alfons Kettner	Bobby Caldwell	4:22
11.	"Warm and Tender Love"	Bobby Robinson	Percy Sledge	3:54
12.	"Whiter Shade of Pale"	Gary Brooker, Keith Reid, Matthew Fisher	Procol Harum	4:44

== Personnel ==
- Michael Bolton – vocals
- Rob Mathes – keyboards and programming (1, 4–6, 8, 10, 12)
- Dave Delhomme – keyboards (1–3, 5–8)
- Greg Phillinganes – keyboards (1–3, 5–8), rhythm arrangements (1–3, 5–8)
- Andre Betts – programming (1)
- Jan Folkson – programming (1, 4–6, 8, 10, 12)
- Tony Harrell – Hammond B3 organ (4, 9, 10, 12), keyboards (4, 9, 10, 12), synthesizers (4, 9, 10, 12)
- John Hobbs – acoustic piano (4, 9, 10, 12), synthesizers (4, 9, 10, 12)
- Dann Huff – electric guitar (1, 7, 9), guitars (4, 12)
- Jeff Mironov – guitars (1–3, 5–8)
- Corrado Sgandurra – guitars (12)
- Michael Thompson – electric guitar (2, 3)
- Blue Miller – acoustic guitar (4, 9, 10, 12)
- Kenny Greenberg – electric guitar (4, 9, 10, 12)
- Steve Lukather – guitars (5, 6, 8, 10)
- Neil Jason – bass (1–3, 5–8), programming (1, 10, 12)
- Michael Rhodes – bass (4, 9, 10, 12)
- Shawn Pelton – drums (1–3, 5–8)
- Eddie Bayers – drums (4, 9, 10, 12)
- Bashiri Johnson – percussion (1–5, 9, 10, 12)
- Dave Koz – alto saxophone (3, 5)
- Michael Brecker – tenor saxophone (6)
- Bob Bailey – backing vocals (1, 3, 5)
- Lisa Cochran – backing vocals (1, 3, 5)
- Melonie Daniels – backing vocals (1, 5–7)
- Kim Fleming – backing vocals (1, 3, 5)
- Vicki Hampton – backing vocals (1, 3, 5)
- Trey Lorenz – backing vocals (1, 5–7)
- Mary Ann Tatum - backing vocals (1, 5–7)
- Lisa Amann – backing vocals (2, 6)
- Michael Mellett – backing vocals (2, 4, 6)
- Wendy Moten – backing vocals (2, 4, 6)
- Nicol Smith – backing vocals (2, 4, 6)
- Chris Rodriguez – backing vocals (4)

== Production ==
- Michael Bolton – producer
- Phil Ramone – producer
- Barry Beckett – producer (4, 9, 10, 12)
- Pete Greene – engineer
- Steve Milo – engineer, studio manager (Passion Studios)
- Dave Reitzas – engineer, mixing (9)
- Eric Schilling – engineer
- Mick Guzauski – mixing (1–8, 10–12)
- Dave Boyer – assistant engineer
- Andrew Felluss – assistant engineer
- Tim Harkins – assistant engineer
- Jason Stasium – assistant engineer
- Tom Bender – mix assistant
- Nick Marshall – mix assistant
- Ted Jensen – mastering at Sterling Sound (New York, NY)
- Jill Dell'Abate – production manager, musical contractor
- Gina Cheshire – Nashville production coordinator (4, 9, 10, 12)
- Christopher Austopchuck – art direction
- Joel Zimmerman – art direction
- Timothy White – photography
- Rebecca Manos – stylist
- Colleen Creighton – hair, make-up
- Louis Levin – direction
- Troy Levin – management for Louis Levin Management
- Jill Tiger – management for Louis Levin Management
- Ronnie Milo – personal assistant
- Allison Wilkie – personal assistant
