= Bolton Swings Sinatra: The Second Time Around =

Studio album by Michael Bolton
- Released: May 23, 2006
- Recorded: March 2005
- Studios: Passion Studios (Westport, Connecticut); Capitol Studios (Hollywood, California); Record Plant and Westlake Studios (Los Angeles, California)
- Genre: Pop
- Length: 41:38
- Label: Concord
- Producers: Michael Bolton; Alex Christensen

Michael Bolton chronology
'Til the End of Forever (2005)	Bolton Swings Sinatra: The Second Time Around (2006)	A Swingin' Christmas (2007)

Professional ratings
Review scores
Source	Rating
Allmusic	link
USA Today	link

Bolton Swings Sinatra: The Second Time Around is an album by Michael Bolton, produced by Alex Christensen, arranged and conducted by Chris Walden. Bolton records songs originally made notable by Frank Sinatra.

== Track listing ==
1. "You Go to My Head" (J. Fred Coots, Haven Gillespie) – 4:03
2. "Fly Me to the Moon" (Bart Howard) – 2:58
3. "For Once in My Life" (Ron Miller, Orlando Burden) – 3:20
4. "Summer Wind" (Hans Bradtke, Henry Mayer, Johnny Mercer) – 2:34
5. "My Funny Valentine" (Lorenz Hart, Richard Rodgers) – 3:52
6. "I've Got You Under My Skin" (Cole Porter) – 3:31
7. "That's Life" (Kelly Gordon, Dean Kay) – 3:17
8. "The Second Time Around" - duet with Nicollette Sheridan (Sammy Cahn, Jimmy Van Heusen) – 4:03
9. "The Girl from Ipanema" (Vinicius de Moraes, Norman Gimbel, Antonio Carlos Jobim) – 3:12
10. "Night and Day" (Porter) – 4:01
11. "They Can't Take That Away From Me" (George Gershwin, Ira Gershwin) – 3:10
12. "Theme from New York, New York" (John Kander, Fred Ebb) – 2:28

== Personnel ==
- Michael Bolton – vocals
- Mike Lang – acoustic piano, Hammond B3 organ, celeste
- Dean Parks – guitars
- Heitor Pereira – guitar solo (9)
- Mike Valerio – bass
- Vinnie Colaiuta – drums
- Luis Conte – percussion
- Jason Delaire – saxophone solo (1, 12)
- Dan Higgins – saxophone solo (3)
- Rick Baptist – trumpet solo (5), flugelhorn solo (6)
- Carmen Twillie – backing vocals (7)
- Terry Wood – backing vocals (7)
- Nicolette Sheridan – vocals (8)

Chris Walden Big Band

- Chris Walden – arrangements and conductor
- Shari Sutcliffe – music contractor
- Ralph Morrison – concertmaster

Horns and Woodwinds

- Jeff Driskill – alto saxophone, flutes
- Kim Richmond – alto saxophone
- Bob Carr – baritone saxophone
- Brandon Fields and Rob Lockart – tenor saxophone
- Michael O'Donovan – bassoon
- Dan Higgins – clarinet
- Earl Dumler – oboe
- Richard Bullock – bass trombone
- Alex Iles, Bob McChesney, Ira Nepus and Arturo Velasco – trombone
- Wayne Bergeron (lead), Ron King, Kye Palmer and Kevin Richardson – trumpet, flugelhorn
- Stephanie O'Keefe, Richard Todd (first), Brad Warnaar and Phil Yao – French horn

Strings

- Ernest Hamilton, Susan Ranney and Mike Valerio – string bass
- Larry Corbett (first), Paula Hochhalter, Steve Richards, Daniel Smith and Rudy Stein – cello
- Gayle Levant Richards – harp
- Robert Becker (first), Denyse Buffum, Matt Funes, Pamela Goldsmith, Jimbo Ross and Evan Wilson – viola
- Eun-Mee Ahn, Darius Campo, Mario DeLeon, Charles Everett, Armen Garabedian, Alan Grunfeld, Peter Kent, Natalie Leggett, Calabria McChesney, Ralph Morrison, Robin Olson, Katia Popov, Michele Richards, Gil Romero, John Wittenberg and Shari Zippert – violin

Percussion

- Bob Zimmitti

== Production ==
- Michael Bolton – producer
- Alex Christensen – producer, mastering
- Steve Genewick – recording
- Al Schmitt – recording, mixing
- Peter Amato – additional engineer
- Steve Milo – additional engineer
- Doug Fenske – assistant engineer
- Rick Fernandez – assistant engineer
- Ryan Kennedy – assistant engineer
- Bruce Monical – assistant engineer
- Bill Smith – assistant engineer
- Paul Smith – assistant engineer
- Brian Warwick – assistant engineer
- Stefan Häfelinger – Pro Tools editing
- Ralf Kessler – mastering
- Pinguin (Hamburg, Germany) – mastering location
- Shari Sutcliffe – project coordinator
- Marysa Brejwo – design
- Naomi Kaltman – front and back cover photography, third page photography
- Jonathan Alcorn – photography production
- Louis Levin – direction
- Charlie Brusco – direction
- Mason Munoz – general manager
