= Michael Bolton =

American singer-songwriter (born 1953)

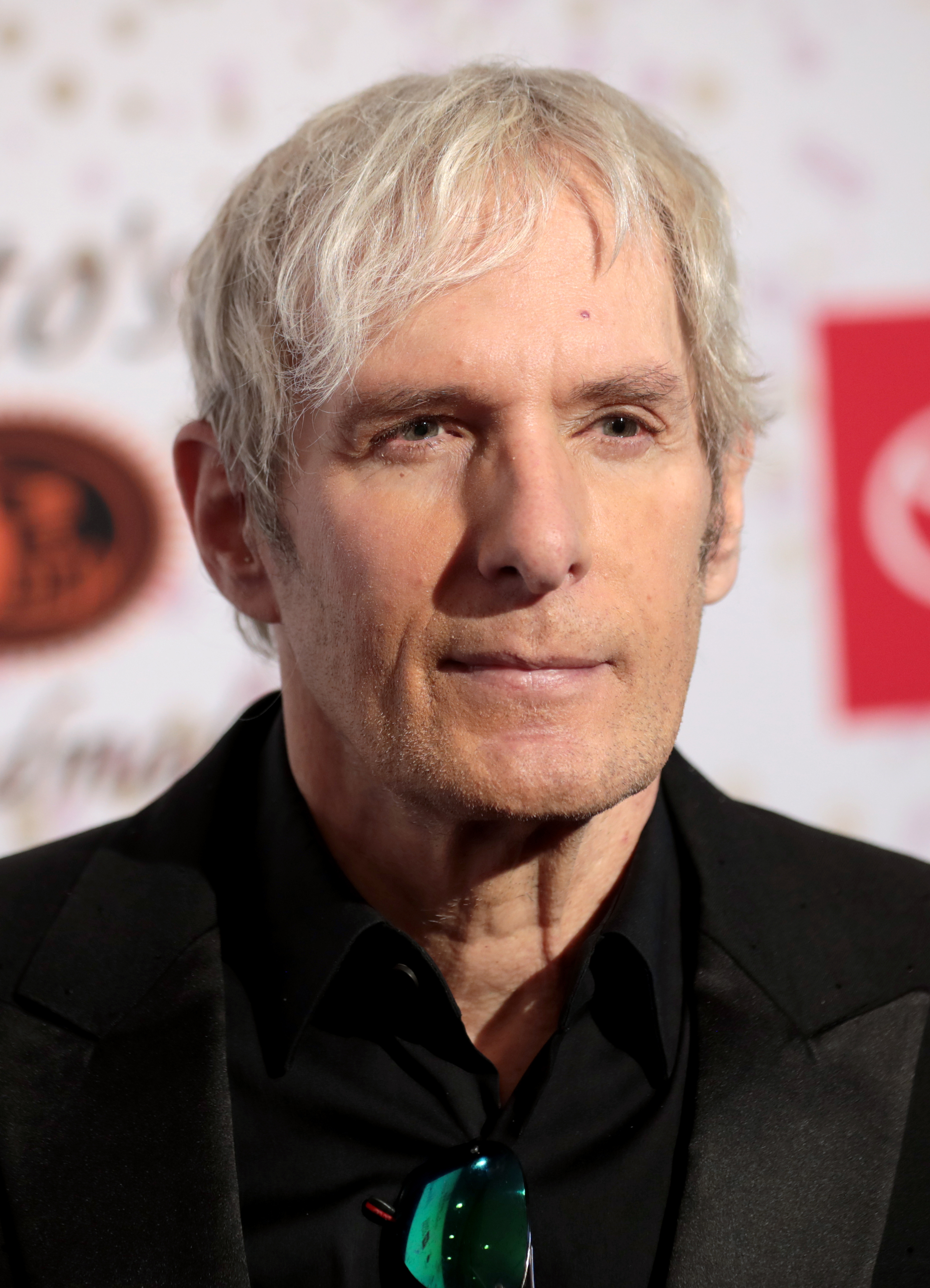
- Bolton in 2022

Background information
- Born: Michael Bolotin; February 26, 1953 (age 73); New Haven, Connecticut, U.S.
- Genres: Pop rock; soft rock; blue-eyed soul; hard rock (early)
- Occupations: Singer; songwriter; musician
- Instruments: Vocals; guitar; piano
- Years active: 1975–present
- Labels: RCA; Columbia; Jive; Concord; Universal Motown
- Formerly of: Blackjack
- Website: michaelbolton.com

Michael Bolotin (born February 26, 1953), known professionally as Michael Bolton, is an American singer and songwriter. Bolton performed in the hard rock and heavy metal music genres from the mid-1970s to the mid-1980s, both on his early solo albums and those he recorded as the frontman of the band Blackjack. His early career also saw him as a successful songwriter, co-writing hits such as "How Am I Supposed to Live Without You" for Laura Branigan, which he later recorded as a solo single.

Bolton achieved peak recognition as a pop ballad singer in the late 1980s and early 1990s with collaborations with songwriters such as Diane Warren and Desmond Child. During that time, he covered such songs as Otis Redding's "(Sittin' On) The Dock of the Bay" and Percy Sledge's "When a Man Loves a Woman". Despite his commercial success in the adult contemporary genre, Bolton faced criticism for being derivative. In 2000, he faced a controversial legal battle with the Isley Brothers over plagiarism, which resulted in a substantial financial settlement.

In later years, he ventured into various other media, including television and film, often appearing as himself. Bolton also participated in Dancing with the Stars and produced the documentary American Dream: Detroit. His personal life includes a long-term relationship and broken engagement with the actress Nicollette Sheridan and a 15-year marriage to Maureen McGuire, with whom he has three daughters. Bolton is also known for his philanthropic efforts, particularly through The Michael Bolton Charities, although he has faced criticism over the way funds raised by the organization have been allocated. He has been recognized for his contributions to music and charity, including receiving a star on the Hollywood Walk of Fame.

Bolton has sold more than 75 million records, and recorded eight top 10 albums and two number-one singles on the Billboard charts, as well as winning six American Music Awards and two Grammy Awards. He has performed with artists including Lucia Aliberti, Patti LaBelle, José Carreras, Tony Cetinski, Ray Charles, Celine Dion, Plácido Domingo, Renée Fleming, Wynonna Judd, B.B. King, The Lonely Island, Luciano Pavarotti, Percy Sledge, and Zucchero.

== Early life ==
Bolton was born Michael Bolotin on February 26, 1953, in New Haven, Connecticut. His father, George, was a local official in the Democratic Party, and his mother, Helen, was a homemaker. He has a brother, Orrin, and a sister, Sandra.

By age 7, Bolton was able to play the saxophone. He began writing songs at age 9. At age 14, he formed a group, the Nomads, that were signed to a singles contract by Epic Records when Bolton was 16. With his parents' permission, he dropped out of high school and left home at age 15 to travel cross country along U.S. Route 66 and pursue music full-time. He took odd jobs, including as Paula Abdul's babysitter.

== Music career ==
=== Hard rock and songwriting ===
Bolton began recording in 1975 at The Church Studio in Tulsa, Oklahoma. This first album was self-titled using his original family name of Bolotin. Early in his musical career, he focused on hard rock, with his band Blackjack once opening for heavy metal artist Ozzy Osbourne on tour. It was rumored that in 1983 Bolton auditioned for, but was denied, the lead vocalist position with Osbourne's former band, Black Sabbath. Bolton later stated this was untrue, saying "That rumor about me auditioning for Black Sabbath was only a rumor, I don't know how on earth it started." In 2004, Bolton's 1980 song "Maybe It's the Power of Love" with Blackjack was sampled by rapper Kanye West for his song "Never Let Me Down".

After anglicizing his family name to Bolton, he gained his first major hit as a songwriter, co-writing "How Am I Supposed to Live Without You" for Laura Branigan, previously best known for singing the pop hit "Gloria". Narrowly missing the Top 10 on the US pop chart, Branigan took the song to number one on the Adult Contemporary chart for three weeks in 1983. The two sought to work with each other again, and their next collaboration was when Bolton co-wrote "I Found Someone" for Branigan in 1985. Her version was only a minor hit, but two years later, Cher resurrected the song, and with it her own singing career. Bolton co-wrote several other songs for both singers. Bolton recorded his own rendition of "How Am I Supposed to Live Without You" in 1988, which reached number one on the Hot 100.

=== Peak success ===
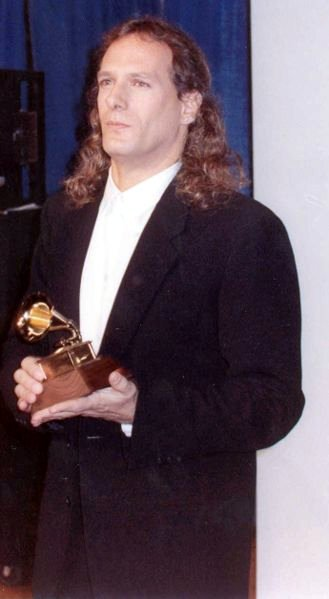
Bolton at the 1990 Grammy Awards

Bolton achieved his greatest success as a pop singer in the late 1980s and early 1990s. He performed songs written by or co-written with major hit songwriters of the era including Diane Warren and Desmond Child (as well as "Steel Bars" penned by Bolton and Bob Dylan), but also had several hits that were remakes of 1960s soul classics. One of his first major hits was his 1987 interpretation of the Otis Redding classic "(Sittin' On) the Dock of the Bay". Redding's widow, Zelma Redding, said she was so moved by Bolton's performance "that it brought tears to my eyes. It reminded me so much of my husband that I know if he heard it, he would feel the same." Always interested in soul music and Motown classics, Bolton had a 1989 hit with a version of "Georgia on My Mind", a song associated with Ray Charles. In 1991, he released the album Time, Love & Tenderness which featured his Grammy Award-winning cover version of "When a Man Loves a Woman", first recorded by Percy Sledge.

From 1987 to 1995, Bolton had four top ten albums and seven top ten songs in the U.S. He had even greater success on the adult contemporary chart, where he had a string of 14 consecutive top ten hits, including eight number ones.

Bolton also had 12 top ten songs in Canada, but was less successful outside of North America with four top ten singles in the UK and a few others in various other European countries.

Bolton's work during the period has been criticized for being derivative, and in 1992, the Isley Brothers filed a lawsuit against Bolton, claiming his 1991 hit song "Love Is a Wonderful Thing" plagiarized their 1966 song of the same name. A fifteen-year legal battle resulted in a $4.2 million payment to the Isleys from Bolton, his co-writer and their publisher. A previous similar lawsuit regarding "How Am I Supposed to Live Without You" had been settled in Bolton's favor.

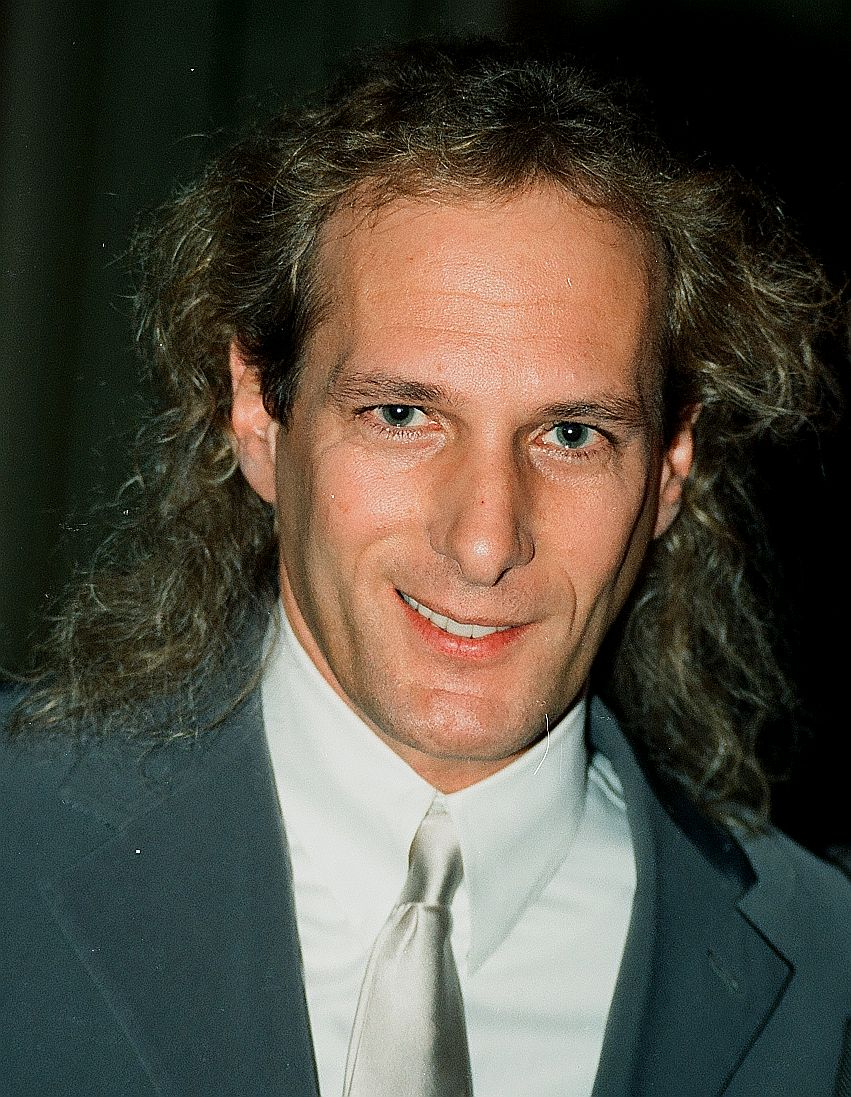
Bolton in 1997

Bolton's last Top 40 single in the US was the 1997 hit "Go the Distance" (from the Disney animated movie Hercules), which peaked at No. 1 on the US adult contemporary chart. He hired conductor Larry Baird, the orchestral musical director, conductor, and arranger for The Moody Blues, Three Dog Night, and Al Jarreau, for his 2001 tour.

=== Later work ===
Bolton's popularity declined in the late 1990s, but he continued to have adult contemporary hits through the mid-2000s. He released albums every year or two through the mid-2010s. His album Only a Woman Like You was released in 2001 with the title song co-written by Shania Twain. In 2006, Bolton and Nicollette Sheridan, his fiancée at the time, sang a duet, "The Second Time Around", for the album Bolton Swings Sinatra. For Over the Rainbow, an album which was recorded in five days, Bolton recorded the song "New York, New York", which was also on his Bolton Swings Sinatra album. This was for an episode of the TV series, Challenge Anneka. The proceeds from the album went to children's hospices across the UK. Bolton released his album One World One Love in the UK on September 21, 2009. The first single, "Just One Love", was released one week earlier. In June 2011, Bolton collaborated with Indian musician A. R. Rahman for a song recorded for Gems – The Duets Collection. In 2013, Bolton released the album Ain't No Mountain High Enough: A Tribute to Hitsville U.S.A., which featured duets with Kelly Rowland, Melanie Fiona and Orianthi.

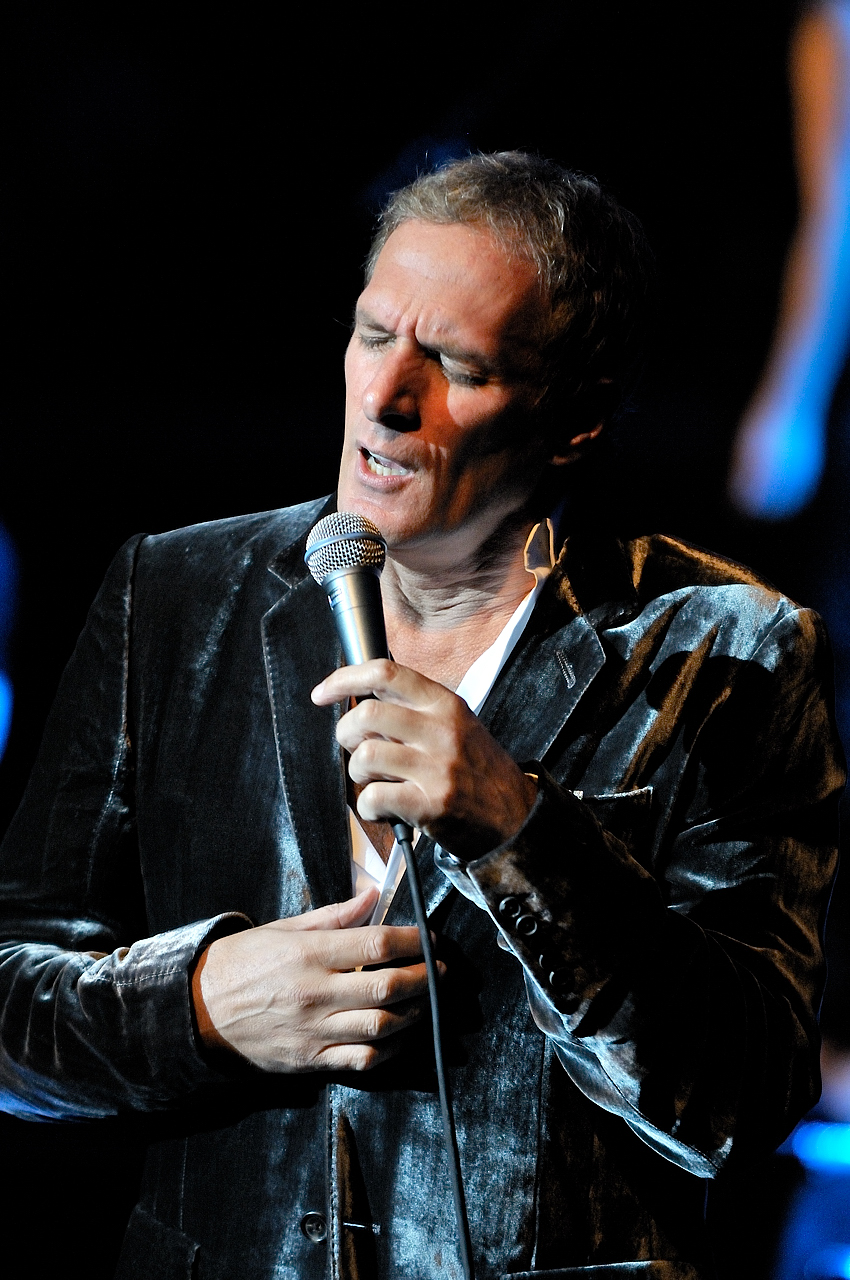
Bolton in Barcelona, Spain, January 2010

In addition to his recordings, Bolton has continued to perform publicly. In March 2007, he toured South Africa for the first time, where he was the headline act at Jacaranda 94.2 FM's two-day concert. He performed a duet entitled "Il Mio Amico" with the Italian singer Anna Tatangelo at the Sanremo Music Festival 2008. The song was originally sung by Tatangelo alone, but the duet version contained English lyrics as well.

In May 2011, Bolton was featured as a guest vocalist in The Lonely Island's song "Jack Sparrow" on their Turtleneck & Chain album. His performance with the comedic hip-hop trio focused on his (intentionally) off-topic chorus and miscommunication with the group, and the video featured him dressed in costumes as Jack Sparrow from Pirates of the Caribbean, Forrest Gump, Erin Brockovich, and Tony Montana from Scarface. He later appeared in the group's 2016 film Popstar: Never Stop Never Stopping, and appears on the film's soundtrack as a guest vocalist on the song "Incredible Thoughts."

Bolton has also performed his music in other media. In August 2006, Bolton was one of Lucy Lawless's duet partners on the Fox Broadcasting Company network's program Celebrity Duets, which Simon Cowell's Syco Productions Company produced for the network. In late 2013 and early 2014, he appeared in Honda commercials in which he sings. In 2015, he sang on an episode of Last Week Tonight with John Oliver concerning the IRS. In the same year, he performed in a Pizza Hut commercial singing Jingle Bells while a family opens up their pizza order. Bolton contributed "Upbeat Inspirational Song About Life" and its reprise to Teen Titans Go! To the Movies, which was released on July 27, 2018. He also voices the Tiger that sings the song in the film.

In 2021, he guest-starred in season six of The Masked Singer where he sang Marvin Gaye & Tammi Terrell "Ain't No Mountain High Enough" with Faith Evans as "Skunk". In 2023, he competed in season nine as "Wolf". After he was eliminated on "DC Superheroes Night", he took the time to promote his upcoming album and did an encore by performing "How Am I Supposed to Live Without You".

Bolton competed in the American Song Contest, representing Connecticut and performing the song Beautiful World, with his first performance in the first week, on March 21, 2022. He made it to the finals, finishing in seventh place.

== Film career ==
Bolton has made several cameo appearances in feature films and television, usually appearing as himself, such as in Meet Wally Sparks (1997), Two and a Half Men (2012), and The Nanny (1998).

In September 2010, Bolton was a contestant on the 11th season of Dancing with the Stars. He and his dance partner Chelsie Hightower were the second couple to be eliminated, on September 28, 2010.

On May 15, 2018, American Dream: Detroit, a documentary produced by Bolton, premiered in the Redford Theatre. Bolton loves Detroit and wanted to highlight its economic comeback. The documentary features interviews with several business moguls, singers and other Detroit natives, including Christopher Ilitch, Jerry Bruckheimer, Francis Ford Coppola, Aretha Franklin, Smokey Robinson, and Alice Cooper.

Although he has been rumored to have appeared as an extra in Dune (1984) as a "spice-eyed" drummer, Bolton has stated in interviews that it is not him.

== Personal life ==
Bolton describes himself as a "rebel Jew". He was raised in a liberal family, and describes his childhood home as having been decorated with both a Hanukkah menorah and a Christmas tree during the holidays. His grandparents kept a kosher household. He left Hebrew school at age 12 when his rabbi forbade him to return unless he stopped joking around. Nevertheless, Bolton became a bar mitzvah at age 13 and has said he maintains some beliefs in Judaism.

Bolton has been a vegetarian since 1970.

In January 2013, Bolton published an autobiography, The Soul of It All: My Music, My Life.

In January 2024, Bolton announced he had undergone emergency surgery for a brain tumor before the December 2023 holidays, and would take a break from touring for the rest of the year. He also added that the surgery had been "a success". In April 2025, Bolton revealed to People magazine in an exclusive interview that his specific diagnosis was glioblastoma. Although surgeons had removed the entire tumor during his emergency surgery, his "short-term memory, speech and mobility have been impacted by his treatments". At over a year past the surgery, Bolton and his healthcare providers were in "monitoring" mode—as the recurrence rate for glioblastoma is around 90 percent—and in the meantime, he chose to remain hopeful, by purposely not receiving a prognosis.

Bolton lives in Westport, Connecticut.

=== Relationships and family ===
Bolton was married to Maureen McGuire from 1975 to 1990. They have three daughters together, each born two years apart: Isa, Holly, and Taryn. He became a grandfather for the first time in October 2010, through his daughter Taryn. As of February 2019, he had six grandchildren.

Bolton was introduced to actress Nicollette Sheridan in 1992 by adult contemporary/jazz saxophonist Kenny G. Bolton and Sheridan dated until breaking up in 1995. They reunited again in 2005 and became engaged in March 2006. However, it was confirmed in August 2008 that they had broken off their engagement.

== Philanthropy ==
In 1993, Bolton established The Michael Bolton Foundation, later renamed The Michael Bolton Charities, to assist women and children at risk from the effects of poverty as well as emotional, physical, and sexual abuse. In the late 1990s, the charity was heavily criticized for the low percentage of contributions that went towards charity work. In 1995 only 15% of the $2.6 million that the foundation raised went to charity, with most of the funds paying for a concert headlined by Bolton.

Bolton and the foundation have had a long-running relationship with former Republican Connecticut Governor John G. Rowland; Rowland steered state funding to Bolton's charity. In 1995, Bolton performed at a fundraiser for Rowland after the foundation received a grant of $300,000 from the state. In 2014, when Rowland was about to be sentenced for honest-services fraud, mail fraud and tax fraud, Bolton wrote a letter in support of Rowland to the judge who was assigned to sentence Rowland. The foundation accepts grant proposals by invitation only.

Bolton also serves as the honorary chairman of Prevent Child Abuse America and the national chairman for This Close for Cancer Research, and he is a member of the boards of the National Mentoring Partnership and the Joe DiMaggio Children's Hospital.

On July 25, 1993, Bolton played against Michael Jordan in a televised charity softball game at the Chicago White Sox stadium, Comiskey Park. Bolton's team, The Bolton Bombers, composed of Bolton and his band, won the game 7–1 against Jordan's team, Jordan's Air Force, which was composed of celebrities including Magic Johnson, Chris Chelios, Ahmad Rashad, Evander Holyfield, Daniel Baldwin, William Baldwin, Mark Harmon, MC Hammer, Tom Selleck, and Stacey King, with Bo Jackson as coach.

In March 2003, Bolton joined with Lifetime Television, Verizon Wireless, and others to lobby on behalf of the National Coalition Against Domestic Violence, promoting legislation to provide more assistance for victims of domestic violence, such as affordable housing options.

Bolton has received the Lewis Hine Award from the National Child Labor Committee, the Martin Luther King Award from the Congress of Racial Equality, and the Ellis Island Medal of Honor from the National Ethnic Coalition of Organizations. The Hollywood Chamber of Commerce recognized Bolton with a star on the Hollywood Walk of Fame for his musical and charitable contributions.

== Discography ==
Since 1975, Bolton has released 24 studio albums and 35 singles. Nine of his singles have peaked at No. 1 on either the Billboard Hot 100 or the Hot Adult Contemporary Tracks charts in the US.

- Michael Bolotin (1975)
- Every Day of My Life (1976)
- Michael Bolton (1983)
- Everybody's Crazy (1985)
- The Hunger (1987)
- Soul Provider (1989)
- Time, Love & Tenderness (1991)
- Timeless: The Classics (1992)
- The One Thing (1993)
- This Is the Time: The Christmas Album (1996)
- All That Matters (1997)
- My Secret Passion (1998)
- Timeless: The Classics Vol. 2 (1999)
- Only a Woman Like You (2002)
- Vintage (2003)
- 'Til the End of Forever (2005)
- Bolton Swings Sinatra (2006)
- One World One Love (2009)
- Gems: The Duets Collection / Duette (2011)
- Ain't No Mountain High Enough–Tribute to Hitsville (2013)
- Songs of Cinema (2017)
- A Symphony of Hits (2019)
- Spark of Light (2023)
- Christmas Time (2023)

== Filmography ==
=== As actor ===
- 1994: The Fresh Prince of Bel-Air as himself (Episode: "Papa’s Got a Brand New Excuse") - Archive footage
- 1997: Meet Wally Sparks
- 1998: The Nanny as himself
- 2002: Snow Dogs (film also features four Michael Bolton songs)
- 2002: High Voltage
- 2008: The Onion Movie
- 2012/14: Two and a Half Men as himself (4 episodes)
- 2015: Glee as himself, episode (Episode: "The Rise and Fall of Sue Sylvester")
- 2016: Popstar: Never Stop Never Stopping
- 2017: Michael Bolton's Big, Sexy Valentine's Day Special
- 2017: Fresh Off the Boat as himself (3 episodes)
- 2018: Teen Titans Go! to the Movies as Tiger
- 2018: Little Big Awesome as himself (Episode: "Friendiversary / Flower Power")
- 2019: Last Week Tonight with John Oliver as himself (Episode: "Compounding Pharmacies")
- 2023: The Masked Singer as Himself/Wolf
- 2023: Clone High as himself
- 2023: Awkwafina Is Nora from Queens as Kevin (2 episodes)
- 2024: Knuckles as Wade's singing voice (Episode: "The Flames of Disaster"; uncredited)

=== As executive producer ===
- 2001: Offside (short)
- 2001: Good Advice
- 2005: Terror at Home: Domestic Violence in America (TV)
- 2008: The Other Side of the Tracks
- 2018: American Dream: Detroit

== See also ==
- List of best selling music artists
- List of artists who reached number one on the Hot 100 (U.S.)
