= Mick Guzauski =

American mixing engineer and sound engineer

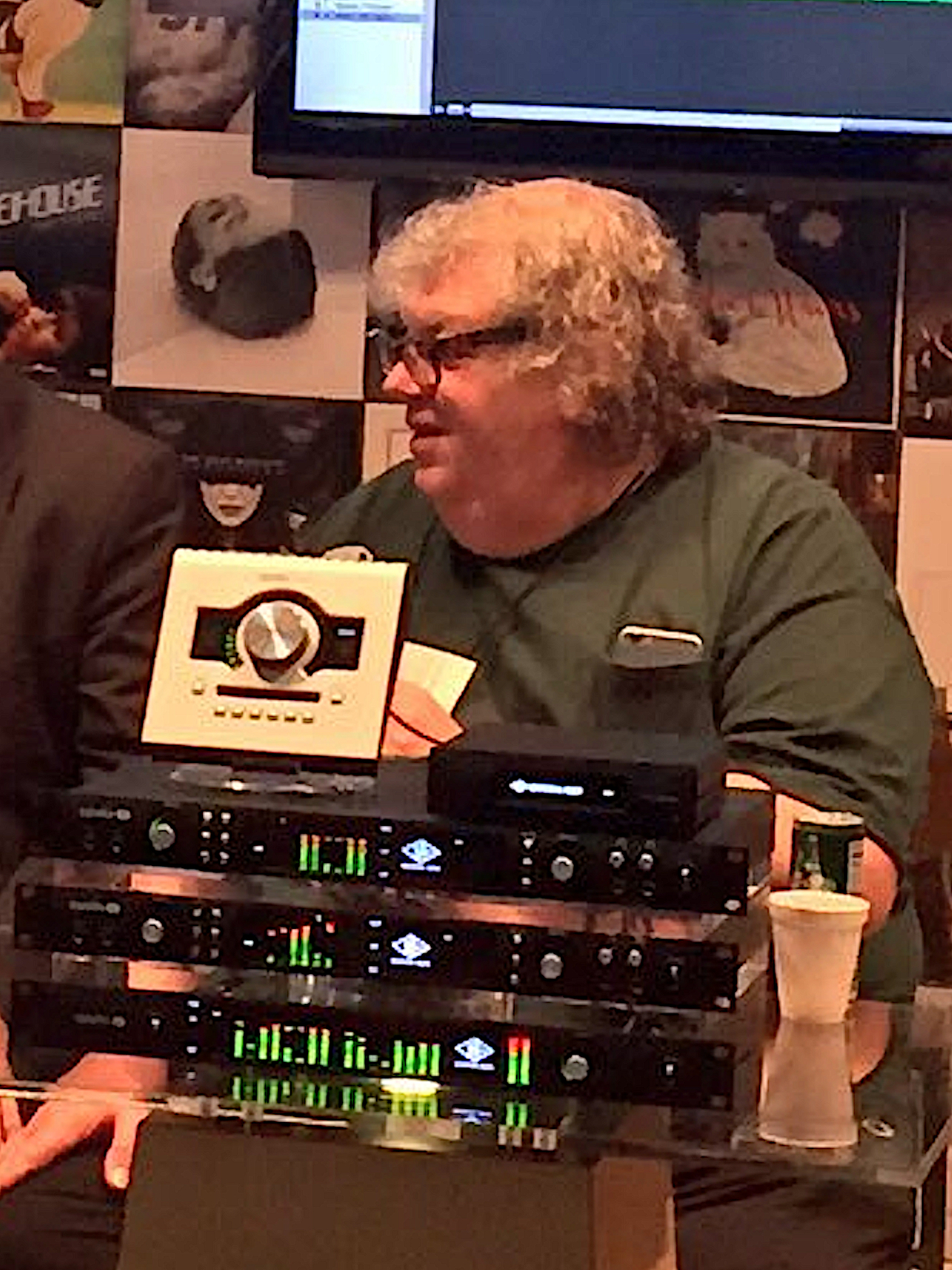
- Mick Guzauski at 2016 NAMM Show (Universal Audio booth)
- Born: Nathan Guzauski; Rochester, New York, U.S.
- Occupations: Mixing engineer; sound engineer
- Years active: 1967–present
- Known for: He won a 2002 Latin Grammy, four 2004 Latin Grammys, and the 2006 Grammy Award for Best Engineered Album, Non-Classical; as of 2001, he had mixed 27 # 1 singles.

Nathan "Mick" Guzauski is an American multi-platinum mixing engineer and sound engineer. He has nine Grammy Awards and eleven nominations.

His work spans a wide range of styles, including jazz, R&B, Latin, rock, pop, easy listening, funk and hip hop. The first Spanish-speaking artist Mick worked with was the Spanish singer "Mónica Naranjo" in 1996 on her multi platinum album "Palabra de Mujer" produced by Cristóbal Sansano . He won a 2002 Latin Grammy for Thalía's "Arrasando", four 2004 Latin Grammys for Alejandro Sanz's "No Es Lo Mismo" (including Best Engineered Album), and the 2006 Grammy Award for Best Engineered Album, Non-Classical, for Eric Clapton's "Back Home." As of 2001, he had mixed 27 # 1 singles. He also won multiple awards for the engineering and mixing of the Daft Punk album Random Access Memories.

== Biography ==
While living in Rochester, New York, Guzauski began his engineering career during the 1960s. In the 1970s, Guzauski was hired by Chuck Mangione. Throughout the 1980s, he primarily worked at Conway Studios. He remained in California before moving to Sony Music Studios during the mid-1990s. In 2001, Guzauski worked with Michael Jackson to create 5.1-channel surround sound remixes of Thriller as well as all his other albums for release on the then new Super Audio CD format yet despite numerous retries the artist never approved any of the mixes. Guzauski also created the Barking Doctor Recording during the mid-1990s.

== Grammy Awards and Nominations ==
Winner – Latin Grammy Award for Best Alternative Music Album

2017 • Jei Beibi

Winner – Grammy Award for Best Urban Contemporary Album

2014 • Girl

Nomination – Grammy Award for Album of the Year

2014 • Girl

Winner – Grammy Award for Album of the Year

2013 • Random Access Memories

Winner – Grammy Award for Best Dance/Electronica Album

2013 • Random Access Memories

Winner – Grammy Award for Best Engineered Album, Non-Classical

2013 • Random Access Memories

Winner – Grammy Award for Record of the Year

2013 • Get Lucky

Winner – Grammy Award for Best pop Instrumental Album

2013 • Steppin’ Out

Winner – Grammy Award for Best Engineered Album, Non-Classical

2006 • Back Home

Winner – Grammy Award for Best Contemporary Blues Album

2007 • The Road To Escondido

Winner – Grammy Award for Best Latin Pop Album

2004 • No Es lo Mismo

Winner – Latin Grammy Award for Record of the Year

2004 • No Es Lo Mismo

Winner – Latin Grammy Award for Album of the Year

2004 • No Es lo Mismo

Winner – Grammy Award for Best Contemporary Blues Album

2008 • The Road to Escondido

Winner – Latin Grammy Award for Best Engineered Album

2004 • No Es lo Mismo

Winner – Latin Grammy Award for Best Male Pop Vocal Album

2004 • No Es lo Mismo

Winner – Latin Grammy Award for Best Engineered Album

2001 • Arrasando

Nomination – Emmy Award for Outstanding Sound Mixing For A Variety Or Music Series Or Special Or Animation

2005 • Eric Clapton Crossroads Guitar Festival (Great Performances)

== Emmy Award nomination ==
Guzauski was nominated in 2005 for an Emmy Award for Outstanding Sound Mixing for a Variety or Music Series or Special or Animation, for his mixing for Eric Clapton in "Great Performances; Eric Clapton Crossroads Guitar Festival" (1972), along with Elliot Scheiner, Ed Cherney, and Neil Dorfsman.

== Select discography ==
(E = engineer; M = mixer)

- Yolanda Adams: Mountain High...Valley Low (1999, M)
- After 7: Reflections (1995, M)
- Christina Aguilera: Mi Reflejo (2000, M), I Turn to You (2000, E/M), Christina Aguilera (1999, M)
- Anastacia: Pieces of a Dream (2005, M)
- Marc Anthony: Mended (2002, M), You Sang to Me (2000, M)
- Tina Arena: Souvenirs (M), In Deep (1997, M)
- Babyface: Everytime I Close My Eyes (1996, M), The Day (1996, M)
- Backstreet Boys: Millennium (1999, M)
- The Bee Gees: Love Songs (2005, M), Still Waters (1997, M)
- George Benson: Starting All Over from Twice the Love(1988, M)
- Michael Bolton: 'Til the End of Forever (2005, M), Timeless: The Classics Vol. 2 (1999, M), All That Matters (1997, M), The One Thing (1993, M), Time, Love & Tenderness (1991, M)
- Boyz II Men: Ballad Collection (2000, M), Extras (1999, M), II (1994, M)
- Brandy: Never Say Never (1998, M)
- Toni Braxton: Un-Break My Heart: The Remix Collection (2005, M), Secrets (1996, M)
- Jim Brickman: Valentine (2002, M), Destiny (1999, M), Visions of Love (1998, M), Picture This (1997, M), Gift (1997, M)
- Sarah Brightman: Harem (2003, M)
- Mariah Carey: Merry Christmas DualDisc (2005, M), Charmbracelet (2002, M), #1s (1998, E/M), Butterfly (1997, M)
- Ray Charles: Thanks for Bringing Love Around Again (2002, E)
- Cher: Chronicles (2005, M), Heart of Stone (1989, E)
- Eric Clapton: Back Home (2005, M), Me and Mr. Johnson (2004, M), One More Car, One More Rider (2002, M), Reptile (2001, M), Riding With the King (2002, M), Pilgrim (1999, M)
- Stanley Clarke: If This Bass Could Only Talk (1988, M), Hideaway (1986, M)
- Natalie Cole: Snowfall on the Sahara (1999, M), Everlasting (1987, E/M)
- Michael Crawford: On Eagle's Wings (1998, M)
- Earth, Wind & Fire: Love Songs (2004, E), Essential Earth, Wind & Fire (2002, E), Millennium (1993, M), Powerlight (1983, E/M)
- Warren Hill: Life Thru Rose Colored Glasses (1998, M), Shelter (1997, M), Truth (1994, M), Devotion (1993, E/M)
- Patti LaBelle: Flame (1997, M), Burnin' (1991, M), Be Yourself (1989, E/M), Winner in You (1986, E)
- Jennifer Lopez: Alive (2002, M), On the 6 (1999, Remixing )
- Monica Naranjo: Palabra de Mujer (1998 M) (Empiezo a Recordarte/ Yo vengo y tù te vas)
- Chuck Mangione: Fun and Games (1979, E), Children of Sanchez (E/M/editing), Feels So Good (1977, E), Chase the Clouds Away (1975, E), Friends and Love (1970, E).
- Brian McKnight: U Turn (2003, M), Superhero & More (2002, M), Superhero (2001, M), Anytime (1997, M)
- Laura Pausini: From the Inside (2002, M)
- Prince: Best of Prince (2006, E/remixing), Hits 2 (1993, E), Hits 1 (1993, remixing), Controversy (1981, E)
- Return to Forever: The Anthology (2008, remixing, M)
- LeAnn Rimes: You Light Up My Life: Inspirational Songs (1997, M)
- Smokey Robinson: One Heartbeat (1987, M), Intimate (1999, M)
- Jessica Simpson: Sweet Kisses (1999, M), Irresistible (2001, M)
- Britney Spears: In the Zone (2003, M)
- Barbra Streisand: Emotion (1984, E), Till I Loved You (1988, E/M), Higher Ground (1997, M), Duets (2002, M)
- Talking Heads: True Stories (1986, mixing assistant), Best of Talking Heads: Once in a Lifetime (1992, M), Talking Heads Brick DualDisc (2005, M), True Stories DualDisc (2006, M)
- Vanessa L. Williams: Sweetest Days (1995, M), Star Bright (1996, M), Next (1997, E/M), Greatest Hits: The First Ten Years (1998, M)
- The Yellowjackets: Live Wires (1991, E/M), Like a River (1992, E/M), Run for Your Life (1993, E), Collection (1995, E/M), Priceless Jazz (1998, E)
- Daft Punk: Random Access Memories (2013, E/M)
- Alicia Keys: It's On Again (2014, M)
- Pharrell Williams: Girl (2014, M), Marilyn Monroe (2014, M), Gust of Wind (2014, M)
- T.I.: Paperwork (2014, M)
- N.E.R.D.: Squeeze Me (2015, M)
- Snoop Dogg: Peaches N Cream (2015, M), So Many Pros (2015, M)
- Tyler, The Creator: Cherry Bomb (2015, M)
- Jamiroquai: Automaton (album) (2017, M)
- Indochine: 13 (album) (2017, M), Singles Collection 1981-2001 (compilation) (2020, M), Singles Collection 2001-2021 (compilation) (2020, M)

== Filmography ==
- Firstborn (1984) (music mixer)
- Asterix and the Big Fight, aka "Astérix et le coup du menhir" (1989) (music mixer)
- Hard to Kill (1990), starring Steven Seagal (music score mixing)
- Love Hurts (1990), starring Jeff Daniels (music recording engineer)
- Out for Justice (1991), starring Steven Seagal (music mixer) (music recordist)
- Diary of a Hitman (1991), starring Forest Whitaker (music mixer)
- Eric Clapton: Live in Hyde Park (1997; TV) (5.1 surround mixer)
- How Stella Got Her Groove Back (1998), starring Angela Bassett (music mixer; music recordist)
- Marc Anthony: The Concert from Madison Square Garden (2000; TV) (sound mixer)
- Eric Clapton: One More Car, One More Rider – Live on Tour 2001 (2002; V) (5.1 surround mixer)
- Eric Clapton: Sessions for Robert J (2004; V) (sound mixer)
- "Great Performances"
  - Eric Clapton's Crossroads Guitar Festival (2004; TV episode) (sound mixer)
  - Cream Reunion Concert (2005; TV episode) (sound mixer)
- Hidden Figures (2016) (additional score mixer)
