= Native Window (album) =

Studio album by Native Window
- Released: June 23, 2009
- Studio: Real 2 Reel Studios, Georgia
- Genre: Progressive rock, pop rock
- Length: 41:13
- Label: StarCity Records (US); Inside Out Music (Europe)
- Producer: Steve Rawls, Native Windows, Jim Gentile

Professional ratings
Review scores
Source	Rating
AllMusic	3.5/5 stars
Classic Rock	8/10 stars

Native Window is the only album of American progressive rock band Native Window. It was released on June 23, 2009. The tracks on the album are all original material composed by the members of the band. The album came about soon after the band formed; it was because Steve Walsh, the lead singer for Kansas, would not write any new material. Phil Ehart, Rich Williams, Billy Greer and David Ragsdale got together to write new songs, and released them under the Native Window name. The song "An Ocean Away" was originally released by Billy Greer's band Seventh Key on their 2004 album The Raging Fire.

== Track listing ==
No.	Title	Writer(s)	Length
1.	"Money"	Michael Alban, Justin Sheehy, Mike Leach, Mark Williams, Kimberly Wilson	4:18
2.	"Still (We Will Go On)"	Wayne Hood, Roxanne Lamendola, Steve Rawls, Keith Ridenour, Douglas Shawe, Native Window	4:23
3.	"Surrender"	Ross Childress, Trevor Hurst	3:23
4.	"The Way You Haunt Me"	Childress, Hurst, Rawls, Native Window	4:01
5.	"The Light of Day"	Ward Abel, Rawls, Native Window	3:30
6.	"Blood in the Water"	Rawls, Native Window	4:44
7.	"An Ocean Away"	Billy Greer, Mike Slamer	3:49
8.	"Miss Me"	Rawls, Native Window	5:15
9.	"Got to Get Out of This Town"	Rawls, Native Window	4:03
10.	"The Moment"	Scott English, Mick Lee	3:47
