= City Boy =

City Boy may refer to:

- City Boy (band), English rock band in the late 1970s
  - City Boy (album), the debut album from City Boy
- "City Boy" (song), a song by Norwegian band Donkeyboy
- City Boy (film), a 1992 PBS/Wonderworks television film based on the novel Freckles
- City Boy: The Adventures of Herbie Bookbinder, 1948 novel by Herman Wouk
- Cityboy, a newspaper column by Geraint Anderson in The London Paper

== See also ==
- "City Boys", a 2023 song by Burna Boy
