= Every Step of the Way (disambiguation) =

Every Step of the Way is a 1988 album by American pianist David Benoit.

Every Step of the Way may also refer to:

- "Every Step of the Way" (song), a Johnny Mathis (1960)
  - A cover by Dickie Rock and The Miami Showband that reached #1 on Irish charts in 1965
- "Every Step of the Way", a John Waite song from his album Mask of Smiles (1985)
- "Every Step of the Way", The Monkees song from their album Pool It! (1987)
- "Every Step of the Way", a Santana song from their album Caravanserai (1972)
- "Every Step of the Way", a McBride & the Ride song from their album Burnin' Up the Road (1990)
- "Every Step of the Way", a Steve Walsh song from his album Schemer-Dreamer (1980)
- "Every Step of the Way", an Ian Hunter song from his album All of the Good Ones Are Taken (1983)
- "Every Step of the Way", a Ferlin Husky song from his album Your Love Is Heavenly Sunshine (1969)
- Every Step of the Way, an album by Peppino D'Agostino (2002)
