= Empty Tremor =

Italian progressive metal band

Empty Tremor was an Italian progressive metal band. They among others released one album on Frontiers Records and two on SG Records.

Their keyboardist Daniele Liverani is also known as a solo artist, as well as the composer of Genius: A Rock Opera. Prior to releasing The Alien Inside, Empty Tremor recruited Oliver Hartmann from At Vance as their new singer.

== Discography ==
- Apocolokyntosys (1997, Rising Sun Productions)
- Eros and Thanatos (2000, Elevate Records)
- The Alien Inside (2004, Frontiers Records)
- Iridium (2010, SG Records)
- Slice of Live (live album, 2015, SG Records)
