= The Three Degrees (song) =

Single by Tara Blaise

from the album Dancing on Tables Barefoot
- Released: August 29, 2005
- Genre: Folk pop
- Label: Spokes Records
- Producer: Olle Romo

Tara Blaise singles chronology
"Paperback Cliché" (2005)	"The Three Degrees" (2005)	"Unbearable Lightness" (2006)

"The Three Degrees" is a single by Irish singer Tara Blaise from her Dancing on Tables Barefoot album, released in 2005.

The single charted at number 9 in Spain.

== Track listing ==
1. "The Three Degrees" (Remix) (3:34)
2. "The Three Degrees" (Album version) (3:56)
3. "Fall for You" (3:31)
