= People of the South Wind =

Single by Kansas

from the album Monolith
- B-side: "Stay Out of Trouble"
- Released: May 1979
- Recorded: January – April 1979
- Genre: Progressive rock, rock
- Length: 3:41
- Label: Kirshner
- Songwriter(s): Kerry Livgren
- Producer(s): Kansas

Kansas singles chronology
"Lonely Wind" (1979)	"People of the South Wind" (1979)	"Reason to Be" (1979)

"People of the South Wind" is a progressive rock single recorded by Kansas and written by Kerry Livgren for their 1979 album Monolith.

== Background ==
The song's lyrics focus on the Kaw people for whom the state of Kansas is named: in the Kansa language, the tribe's name roughly translates as "People of the South Wind". Following the success of previous singles "Carry On Wayward Son", "Point of Know Return", and "Dust in the Wind", "People of the South Wind" became the fourth Top 40 hit for Kansas. After the Monolith tour, the song was not performed live again until the mid-1990s because the band believed fans did not like the album.

Kansas guitarist Rich Williams would call the song the band's "most pop moment": (Rich Williams quote:)"[It] had that constant disco drum beat...We never had done happy sounds like that. We were always a much deeper, minor key, melodic band, unless it was a very grandiose thing like 'Song for America' [which] was more of classical composition....'People of the South Wind' was...more like us doing a disco song by somebody else."

== Structure ==
The song has an upbeat tempo, with the drums playing beats on the eighth note. From 0:00–0:22, the song opens with an instrumental intro. The keyboard has the melody from 0:00-0:12, and the guitar and violin pick it up from 0:13–0:22. The vocals start at 0:23, and the first verse is from 0:23–0:51. The keyboard, bass, and drums provide accompaniment during the first verse. The pre-chorus is from 0:38–0:51, with the guitar joining the accompaniment. The first chorus is from 0:52–1:05. The violin joins in at this point, playing the melody along with the backing vocals. The lead vocals harmonize above the melody. The second verse is from 1:06–1:32, with the keyboard, guitar, bass, and drums providing accompaniment. The second chorus lasts from 1:33–1:47, leading into a guitar solo from 1:48–2:15. The intro from the beginning plays again from 2:16–2:30. The third verse lasts from 2:31–2:57, and the third chorus fades out from 2:58–3:38. "People of the South Wind" takes a greater pop approach than other Kansas songs to appeal to a larger audience. The single brought Kansas modest success, as it peaked at twenty-three on the Billboard Hot 100.

== Reception ==
Cash Box said that "swishing violin, with rock steady, pounding drum and piano, meld with straight-ahead powerhouse lead vocal and harmonies."

== Charts ==
Chart (1979)	Peak position
Canada Top Singles (RPM)	59
US Billboard Hot 100	23

== Music videos ==
Two music videos for the track exist. The song, along with three other tracks from Monolith ("On the Other Side", "Reason to Be", "Away from You"), depict the group performing on stage (except "Reason to Be" which shows the group performing in a cave) where they are looked upon by the figure that appears on the cover to Monolith. A separate video for "People of the South Wind" was also released and has received airplay on channels such as VH1 Classic. This video is essentially the same as the original but omits the scenes involving the Monolith character, giving more focus on the band's performance.
