= Paperback Cliché =

Single by Tara Blaise

from the album Dancing on Tables Barefoot
- Released: July 16, 2005
- Genre: Folk pop
- Label: Spokes Records
- Songwriters: Tara Blaise, John Xavier Hughes
- Producer: Olle Romo

Tara Blaise singles chronology
"Fool for Love" (2004)	"Paperback Cliché" (2005)	"The Three Degrees" (2005)

Remix CD cover

"Paperback Cliché" is the second single by Irish singer Tara Blaise from her Dancing on Tables Barefoot album, released in 2005.

The single charted at number 50 in Spain and at number 2 on Irish Airplay charts.

== Track listing ==
=== CD single ===
1. "Paperback Cliché" (3:27)
2. "A Promise" (3:30)

=== Remix single ===
1. "Paperback Cliché"
2. "Paperback Cliché" (Club remix)
3. "Paperback Cliché" (Album version)
