= 5705 =

5705 may refer to:

- The year 5705 in the 6th millennium
- The Hebrew year 5705
- 5705 Ericsterken, a Main Belt asteroid discovered in 1965
- NGC 5705, a spiral galaxy in the constellation Virgo
- "5.7.0.5.", a 1978 song by the British rock group City Boy
