= Alberto Rigoni =

Italian bassist and composer

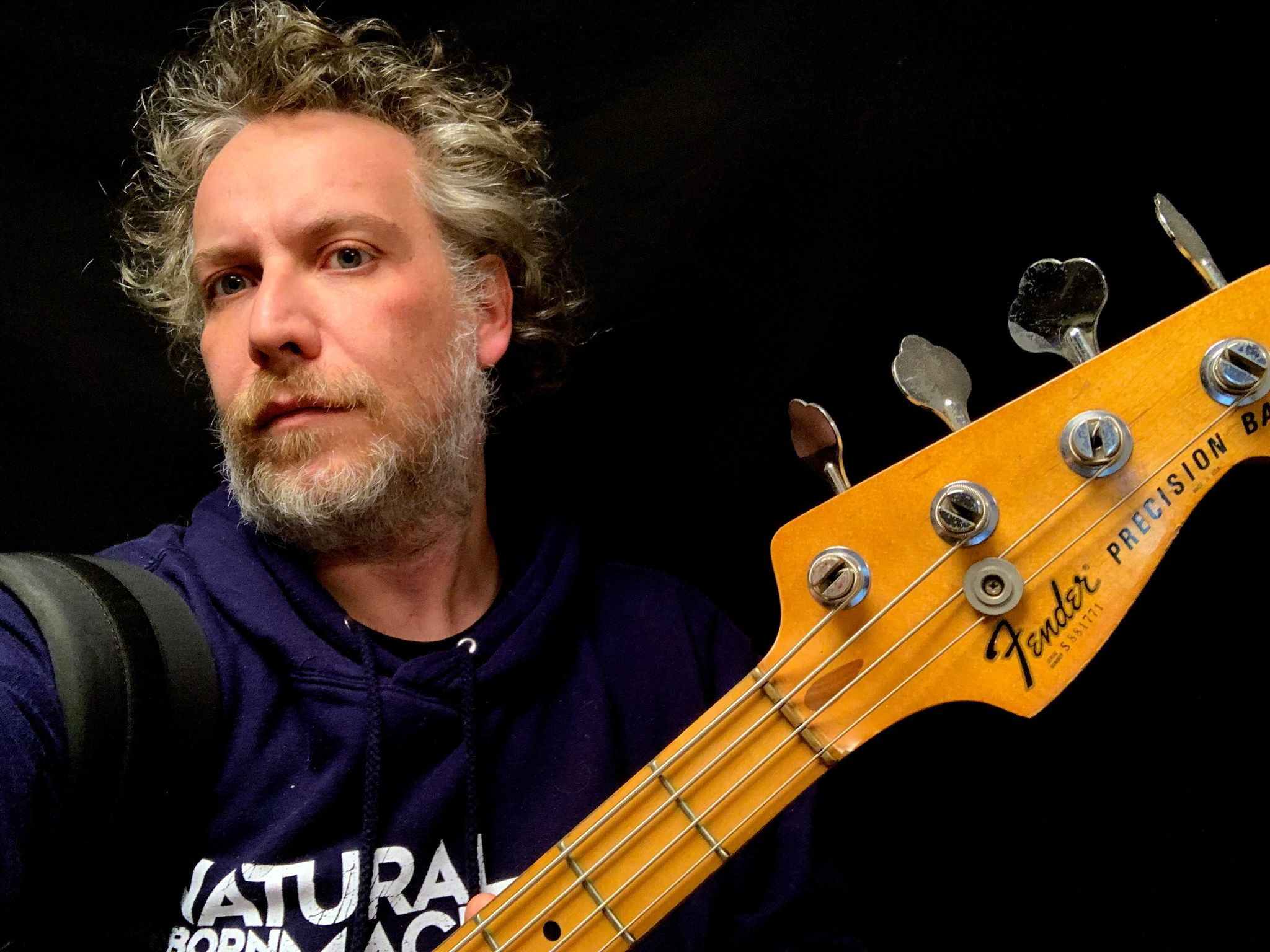
- Rigoni in 2020

Background information
- Born: Montebelluna, Italy
- Genres: Hard rock; progressive rock; heavy metal
- Occupation: Musician
- Instrument: Bass guitar
- Years active: 1998–present
- Labels: Slipstick; Lion; Nightmare; Pride & Joy
- Member of: Twinspirits; Bad As; Bassists Alliance; Natural Born Machine; Burning Black
- Formerly of: Ascra; BADASS
- Website: albertorigoni.net

Alberto Rigoni is an Italian bass guitarist and composer who has recorded solo and as a member of the groups Ascra, Twinspirits, BAD As, Bassists Alliance, and Natural Born Machine. He has also contributed to recordings by a variety of artists. Between 2008 and 2023, Rigoni released thirteen solo albums that have featured guests such as Jordan Rudess, Gavin Harrison, Kevin Moore, Goran Edman, Marco Minnemann, Thomas Lang, Nathan East, Billy Sheehan, and Leland Sklar.

== Career ==
In 1998, together with drummer Enrico Buttol, Rigoni formed the group Ascra, which mainly performed Dream Theater covers. In 2003, he joined the Italian progressive metal group Twinspirits, formed by Daniele Liverani. They released their debut album, The Music That Will Heal the World, in 2007. They have since issued the albums The Forbidden City (2009) and Legacy (2011).

In 2008, Rigoni released his debut solo album, Something Different. He followed it with Rebirth (2011), Three Wise Monkeys (2012), Overloaded (2014), Into the BASS (2015), and BASSORAMA (2016).

In 2016, he founded the metal band BADASS, which featured singer Titta Tani, guitarist Alessio "Lex" Tricarico, and drummer Denis "Denzy" Novello. Their debut album, More Pain, More Gain was released on 1 April 2017 by Lion Music/Cargo Records (UK). In 2018, the band's lineup changed and on 31 November, the group, now known as BAD As, released Midnight Curse through Rockshot Records. They subsequently toured around Europe, opening for Vinnie Moore.

In December 2017, after releasing his seventh solo album, Duality, Rigoni and bassist Jeff Hughell created the studio project Bassists Alliance. Their first album, Crush, features Michael Manning, Adam Nitti, Steve Di Giorgio, Colin Edwin, Mark Mitchell, Scott Reeder, Dmitry Lisenko, Brandino BassMaster, Ryan Martini, Leonid Maksimov, and Tony Grey.

In 2018, Rigoni recorded EvoRevolution with German drummer Marco Minnemann. In 2019, he released his eighth solo album, Prog Injection, featuring Thomas Lang on drums. Odd Times followed a year later and again featured Marco Minnemann, with Alexandra Zerner on guitars and keyboards.

In 2020, BAD As released their third album, Crucified Society, and the same year, Rigoni formed the group Natural Born Machine. In 2021, they released their debut album, Human.

Rigoni has since released the albums For the Love of BASS (2021), Metal Addicted (2021), Songs for Souls (2022), Grains of Sand (2022), and Unexpected Lullabies (2024).

In December 2025, Rigoni joined the Italian metal band Burning Black.

== Discography ==
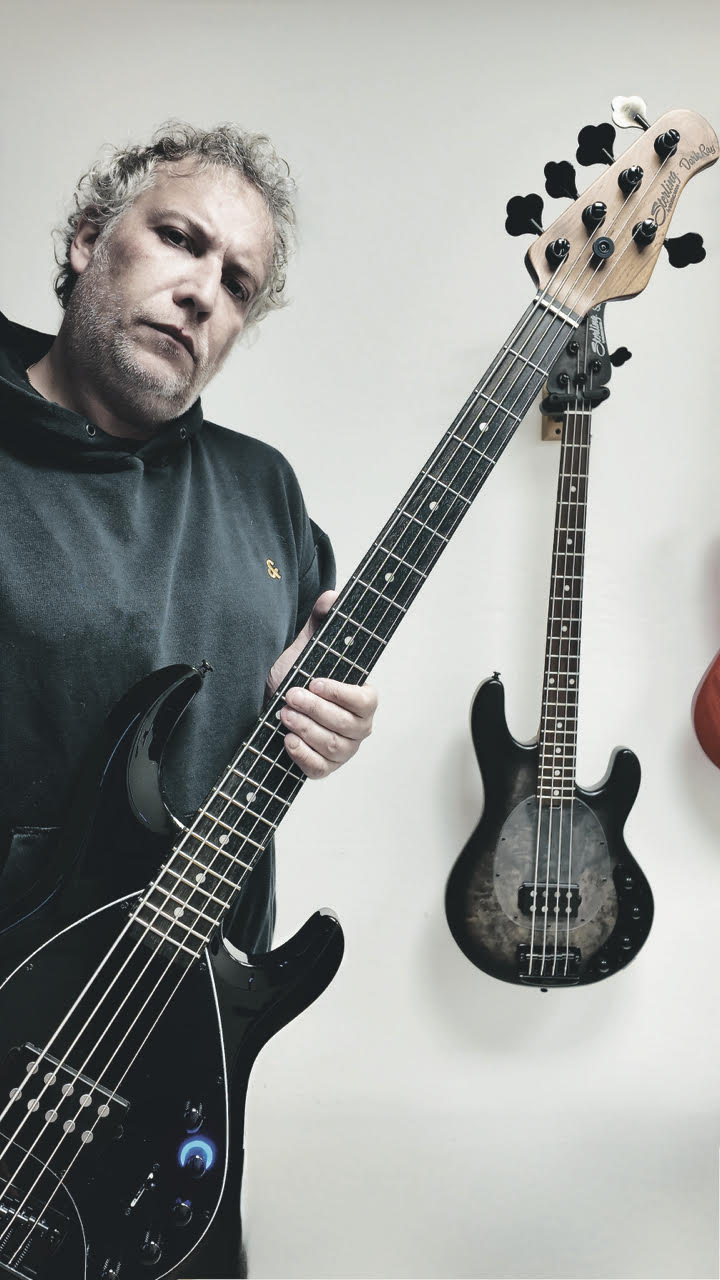
Alberto Rigoni in 2025

=== Solo ===
- Something Different (2008)
- Rebirth (2011)
- Lady and the BASS (Groovy) (EP, 2012)
- Three Wise Monkeys (2012)
- Overloaded (2014)
- Into the BASS (2015)
- BASSORAMA (2016)
- Duality (2017)
- EvoRevolution (feat. Marco Minnemann) (2018)
- Prog Injection (feat. Thomas Lang) (2019)
- Odd Times (feat. Marco Minnemann & Alexandra Zerner) (2020)
- For the Love of BASS (2021)
- Metal Addicted (EP, 2021)
- Songs for Souls (with Jordan Rudess, Jennifer Batten, Mark Zonder, and many more) (2022)
- Grains of Sand (Alberto Rigoni & Michael Manring) (2022)
- Unexpected Lullabies (2024)
- Nemesis Call (2024)
- Dystopia (A Progressive Bass Journey) with Michael Manring and Stuart Hamm (2025)

=== with Twinspirits ===
- The Music That Will Heal the World (2007)
- The Forbidden City (2009)
- Legacy (2011)

=== with BADASS ===
- More Pain, More Gain (2016)

=== with BAD As ===
- Midnight Curse (2019)
- Crucified Society (2020)
- Fight the Demons (2023)

=== with Natural Born Machine ===
- Human (2021)

=== Other appearances ===
- A Step Ahead (Tommy Ermolli) (2009)
- Dragon Fire (Mistheria) (2010)
- Dolcetti Metal Beat (Gianni Rojatti) (2010)
- Obsession (The BASStards) (2011)
- iCanzonissime (Alexia) (2013)
- Warnings (John Jeff Touch) (2014)
- Live at Teatro delle Voci (The Italians) (2016)
- "Meta Funk" (Sunset Groove Society) (2024)
