= Seventh Key (album) =

Studio album by Seventh Key
- Released: May 15, 2001
- Genre: Hard rock, arena rock
- Length: 54:15
- Label: Frontiers
- Producer: Mike Slamer

Seventh Key chronology
Seventh Key (2001)	The Raging Fire (2004)

Professional ratings
Review scores
Source	Rating
AllMusic	3/5 stars

Seventh Key is the first album by the American rock group Seventh Key.

== Track listing ==
All tracks are written by Mike Slamer and Billy Greer, except for where noted.

No.	Title	Writer(s)	Length
1.	"The Kid Could Play"		4:38
2.	"Only the Brave"		5:33
3.	"Missy"	David Manion	4:10
4.	"Surrender"		4:54
5.	"When Love Is Dying"		5:16
6.	"No Man's Land"	Steve Walsh, Steve Morse, Phil Ehart	3:56
7.	"Every Time It Rains"	Morse, Greer	4:14
8.	"Home"		5:35
9.	"Forsaken"	Walsh	5:03
10.	"Prisoner of Love"		5:16
11.	"Broken Home"	Mark Spiro	5:40

== Personnel ==
Seventh Key

- Billy Greer - bass guitar, acoustic guitar, lead vocals
- Mike Slamer - electric and acoustic guitars, producer, engineer, mixing and (Drums under the pseudonym "Chet Wynd")
- David Manion - keyboards
- Terry Brock - background vocals

Guest musicians

- Igor Len - keyboards on "Broken Home"
- Phil Ehart - drums on "No Man's Land" and "Every Time It Rains"
- Steve Walsh - keyboards on "No Man's Land" and "Every Time It Rains"
- Steve Morse - guitar on "No Man's Land" and "Every Time It Rains"
- Rich Williams - guitar on "Missy", "No Man's Land" and "Every Time It Rains"

Production

- Rick Diamond - photography
