= Dancing on Tables Barefoot =

Studio album by Tara Blaise
- Released: (Republic of Ireland) May 31, 2005 (United Kingdom) July 4, 2005; November 2006 (Reissue)
- Genre: Pop, folk
- Label: Spokes Records; DRO/Atlantic (reissue)
- Producer: Olle Romo

Tara Blaise chronology
| Dancing on Tables Barefoot (2005) | Great Escape (2008) |

Singles from Dancing on Tables Barefoot
- 1. "Fool for Love" Released: 2004; 2. "Paperback Cliché" Released: 16 May 2005; 3. "The Three Degrees" Released: 29 August 2005; 4. "Unbearable Lightness" Released: 28 March 2006; 5. "21 Years" Released: October 2006

2006 Reissue cover

Dancing on Tables Barefoot is the debut solo album by Irish singer Tara Blaise released in 2005.

== Background ==
Blaise had previously met John Hughes, the manager of The Corrs, when he was looking for a vocalist to sing on his own album. Hughes signed him to his label, Spokes, and the Corrs' producer, Olle Romo, produced her solo debut. The first single from the album, "Fool for Love," was touted by BBC Radio 2 broadcasters Terry Wogan and Jonathan Ross.

The album was re-issued in 2006 on DRO/Atlantic with four additional songs.

== Critical reception ==
The album received mixed reviews. The Sunday Times praised it: "Pretty much everything here could be a single - and there aren't many albums you can say that about." RTÉ gave the album 3/5 stars, praising Blaise's voice but calling some of the songs "inane." Several reviewers compared Blaise's music to Kate Bush and Joni Mitchell, as well as the Corrs.

== Track listing ==
All songs written by John Hughes and Tara Blaise

1. "The Three Degrees" – 3:53
2. "Superman in a Bottle" – 3:39
3. "Fool for Love" – 3:32
4. "21 Years" – 3:38
5. "Paperback Cliché" – 3:26
6. "Later" – 3:26
7. "For Your Own Good" – 3:44
8. "Feel Free" – 3:58
9. "Radio Star" – 3:14
10. "Ladybird" – 4:17
11. "Little Girl" – 3:10
12. "Unbearable Lightness" – 5:13

=== Re-release ===
1. "21 Years"
2. "Didn't Make the Cover"
3. "The Three Degrees" (Remix)
4. "Paperback Cliché"
5. "Fool for Love"
6. "Fall for You"
7. "Superman in a Bottle"
8. "Feel Free"
9. "Ladybird"
10. "Later"
11. "For Your Own Good"
12. "Primrose"
13. "Unbearable Lightness"
14. "Winter Wonderland" (Bernard Felix, Richard B Smith)

== Personnel ==
- Tara Blaise – Vocals, Background Vocals
- Brian Byrne – String Arrangements
- Anthony Drennan – Guitar
- Jason Duffy – Drums
- Simon Fowler – Sleeve Photo
- John Hughes – Producer
- Irish Film Orchestra – Additional Strings
- Steve MacMillan – Mixing
- Roger Joseph Manning Jr. – Keyboards
- Stephen Marcussen – Mastering
- Tony Molloy – Bass
- Andrew Murray – Production Coordination
- Rob O'Connor – Photography
- Tim Pierce – Guitar
- Olle Romo – Drums, Programming, Producer, Engineer
- Max Surla – String Orchestrations
- Caitriona Walsh – Orchestra Manager
- Lyle Workman – Guitar
