= Song for America (song) =

Single by Kansas

from the album Song for America
- Released: April 1975
- Recorded: 1974
- Genre: Progressive rock
- Length: 10:03 (Album version); 9:08 (The Best of Kansas version); 3:02 (Single edit)
- Label: Kirshner
- Songwriter(s): Kerry Livgren
- Producer(s): Jeff Glixman

Kansas singles chronology
"Bringing It Back" (1975)	"Song for America" (1975)	"It Takes a Woman's Love (To Make a Man)" (1976)

"Song for America" is the title track from the second album of American progressive rock band Kansas. It was written by guitarist and keyboardist Kerry Livgren during the period of heavy touring for the band's first album. The song was released on the 1975 album Song for America, and later released as the band's third single, although it did not chart. It has a symphonic structure, and its lyrics describe America's state before and after colonization.

Livgren wrote the song while looking down at the country from an airplane. He said "I was musing over our relatively young nation."

== Structure ==
The song begins with a 3-minute instrumental overture. It has a symphonic structure. An extended instrumental section is in 9/8 time. The single version lacks most of the instrumental parts, and is cut down to three minutes. This version, which was edited by the record label owner Don Kirshner, is available as a bonus track on the remastered version of the album. The flipside of the 45 featured an instrumental version of the track.

== Reception ==
Cash Box said it features "excellent musicianship and a strong lyric line". Record World said "Not the kind of 100 percent patriotic paean you'd expect the Federal government to commission, but a more believable and dramatic unofficial anthem that carves its own niche into the Bicentennial era."

Classic Rock critic Dave Ling rated "Song for America" as the band's third greatest song. Ultimate Classic Rock critic Eduardo Rivadavia rated it the band's fourth greatest song, saying it "delivers a state-of-the-union address that spans decades, before and after European colonization". Classic Rock History critic Brian Kachejian rated it as the band's seventh greatest song, calling it "Simply stunning music that is timeless."

== Personnel ==
- Kerry Livgren – keyboards
- Steve Walsh – lead vocals, keyboards
- Robby Steinhardt – violin, co-lead vocals
- Dave Hope – bass
- Phil Ehart – drums
- Rich Williams – guitar
