= Tiago Della Vega =

Brazilian guitarist (born 1984)

Tiago della Vega
- Born: 9 March 1984 (age 42); Caxias do Sul, Brazil
- Genres: Instrumental metal, heavy metal
- Instrument: Guitar
- Years active: 2005–present
- Label: SG Records
- Website: www.tiagodellavega.net

Tiago della Vega (born 9 March 1984) is a Brazilian guitarist. Born in Caxias do Sul, Rio Grande do Sul, he began learning to play the acoustic guitar at the age of five. After a year, he realized that the electric guitar was his greatest passion. He started to study electric guitar, practicing 16 hours a day.

Tiago della Vega played with the bands After Dark and Fermatha. At present, he travels around the world playing and doing workshops. He previously held the Guinness World Records title as the fastest guitar player in the world, playing The Flight of the Bumblebee by Nikolai Rimsky-Korsakov at 340 beats per minute at CES in Las Vegas. He broke his previous record on the 9 May 2008 at EM&T in São Paulo.

But in 2017 broke his limits again, becoming the fastest guitarist in the world (approved by the Guinness Book) playing at 750 beats per minute.

In 2012, Rolling Stone Brasil included Vega in their list of 70 Brazilian masters of guitar and acoustic guitar.

He endorses Orange Amps and plays a custom signature Andrellis 7-string guitar which has 24 frets and a Floyd Rose tremolo, the Andrellis TDV.

== Discography ==
- Hybrid (first solo CD – 2009)
- Advent of the Truth (with Fermatha – 2005)
- Believe (with Burning In Hell – 2006)
