= Great Escape (Tara Blaise album) =

Studio album by Tara Blaise
- Released: 2 May 2008
- Genre: Pop, folk
- Label: Spokes
- Producer: Greg French; Olle Romo; Robert John "Mutt" Lange

Tara Blaise chronology
Dancing on Tables Barefoot (2005)	Great Escape (2008)

Singles from Great Escape
- 1. "Fall at the Start" Released: 25 July 2007; 2. "Breathe" Released: 21 March 2008; 3. "Make You" Released: 2008

Great Escape is the second solo album by Irish singer Tara Blaise. It was released on 2 May 2008 (See 2008 in music) by Spokes Records.

== Track listing ==
1. "Make You" - 4:02
2. "Breathe" - 4:12
3. "Great Escape" - 3:44
4. "Taller on the Phone" - 2:34
5. "Let's Talk" - 3:05
6. "Secret Garden Party" - 4:21
7. "Fall at the Start" - 3:30
8. "Rage About It" - 3:38
9. "Rosalie" - 4:10
10. "New Red Shoes" - 4:19

== Singles ==
=== "Fall at the Start" ===
The single cover for "Fall at the Start"

"Fall at the Start" Written By Tara Blaise, Greg French & John Hughes, released on 25 July 2007, was the first single from the album. It was released less than a year after "Twenty One Years", which was the final single from her 2005 debut album Dancing on Tables Barefoot, and nearly one year before the rest of the Great Escape album.

==== Track listing ====
1. "Fall at the Start" (3:28)
2. "Fall at the Start" Featuring Greg French (Acoustic version) (3:19)

=== "Breathe" ===
The single cover for "Breathe"

Written By Tara Blaise, Greg French & John Hughes. On 21 March 2008 the second single, "Breathe", was released. The UK CD single was released on 8 December 2008.

A studio video by Stylorouge for "Breathe" appeared on Tara Blaise's website in October 2008. Also on 7 October Terry Wogan played the song on his morning show, Wake Up to Wogan, and has since aired it a number of times.

==== Track listing ====
1. "Breathe"
2. "Breathe" (Acoustic version)

=== "Make You" ===
The third single was the album's opening track, entitled "Make You", Written By Tara Blaise & Greg French and produced by Robert John "Mutt" Lange.

The song entered RTÉ's Radio 1 Playlist on 5 May. A studio video for "Make You" appeared on Tara Blaise's website in October 2008.
