= The Maisonettes =

British band

- Origin: Birmingham, England
- Genres: Synthpop, psychedelic pop
- Years active: 1982–1984
- Past members: Lol Mason; Mark Tibenham; Nick Parry; Andy Kanavan

The Maisonettes were an English pop band formed by Lol Mason (formerly of City Boy) with Mark Tibenham and drummer Nick Parry, best known for their hit single "Heartache Avenue".

== History ==
The group's debut single, "Heartache Avenue", reached number 7 on the UK Singles Chart in early 1983, reached number 6 on the Irish Singles Chart, topped the UK Independent Chart, and later peaked at number 12 on the Canadian chart and number 97 in Australia. The band's demo was picked up by David Virr, who released "Heartache Avenue" on his own Ready Steady Go! label. The single had been recorded with session backing singers, but to promote the single, they recruited models Denise Ward and Elaine Williams, although these two were later replaced by Carla Mendonça and Elisa Backer (née Richards).

The follow-up single, "Where I Stand", peaked at number 28 on the UK Independent Chart.

In 1984, their album, Maisonettes for Sale, was released in Canada, including "Heartache Avenue" and ten other songs. With no further hits, the group soon disbanded. "Heartache Avenue" was a song about Filton Avenue in Bristol.

In 2004, Heartache Avenue: The Very Best of the Maisonettes was released in the UK by Cherry Red records, containing two unreleased tracks, the original "Heartache Avenue" and a remix, and fifteen other songs.

On 31 July 2019, Laurence "Lol" Edward Mason died at the age of 69 in his home in Harborne from a heart attack, after complications following a kidney transplant.

== Discography ==
=== Albums ===
- Maisonettes for Sale (Ready Steady Go!, 1983)

Compilations

- Heartache Avenue: The Very Best of the Maisonettes (Cherry Red, 2004)

=== Singles ===
Year	Single	Peak chart positions			Certifications
Year	Single	UK	UK Indie	AUS	Certifications
1982	"Heartache Avenue"	7	―	97	BPI: Silver
1983	"Where I Stand"	80	28	―	
1983	"Addicted"	―	―	―	
1983	"This Affair" / "Say It Again" (double A-side)	―	―	―	
1983	"Lifeboat"	―	―	―	
1983	"Hot Club"	―	―	―	
1984	"Two Can Have a Party"	―	―	―	
"—" denotes releases that did not chart or were not released.
