= Streets (band) =

American hard rock band

- Origin: Atlanta, Georgia, United States
- Genres: Hard rock
- Years active: 1982–1985
- Labels: Atlantic, King Biscuit Flower Hour
- Past members: Tim Gehrt; Billy Greer; Mike Slamer; Steve Walsh

Streets was an American hard rock band made up of singer/keyboardist Steve Walsh, guitarist Mike Slamer, bassist Billy Greer, and drummer Tim Gehrt. They formed in 1982 in Atlanta, Georgia, United States.

Steve Walsh had been in the band Kansas and Mike Slamer has been in several other bands, including Britain's City Boy. He was also a session guitarist. Greer and Gehrt were regional players who had seen success with bands in Tennessee and Atlanta, respectively. Gehrt was working with ex-Deep Purple bassist Glenn Hughes when Walsh recruited him for Walsh's first solo effort, Schemer-Dreamer. Walsh had noticed him when one of Gehrt's earlier bands had opened for Kansas. The two became friends and eventually spoke of forming a band together. Slamer had never met Walsh until he showed up for the audition. "I decided that I wanted to move to America," says Slamer. "The kind of music that I wanted to make wasn't being played at all in England, so I came here."

Streets made its debut performance at Charlie Daniels' annual Volunteer Jam in January, 1983. The band played on another band's equipment and only played four songs. The debut LP was released later that year on Atlantic Records.

"We got out there and proved that we could play," said Walsh. "We go out there and we did damn good. We proved to ourselves that we could pull it off and that we were on the right track. Starting over was very humbling. But we got a lot of good feedback to the album. We were playing live every night and being onstage (was) very renewing for us..."

"I wanted to form a democratic band," said Walsh. "I did not want to be a solo singer with a band of sidemen. I like being in a band... I couldn't have done (that project) alone. I needed the help of every musician involved. We were all of equal importance in the creation of the final song."

The band later recorded its second album, Crimes in Mind, in 1985. Soon after, Streets disbanded. A year later, Walsh rejoined Kansas.

== Members ==
- Steve Walsh – lead vocals, keyboards
- Mike Slamer – guitar
- Billy Greer – bass, vocals
- Tim Gehrt – drums, percussion, vocals

== Discography ==
=== Studio albums ===
- 1st (1983)
- Crimes in Mind (1985)

=== Live albums ===
- King Biscuit Flower Hour Presents Streets (1997)
