= 1st (album) =

Studio album by Streets
- Released: October 1983
- Genre: AOR
- Length: 37:45
- Label: Atlantic
- Producer: Neil Kernon

Streets chronology
1st (1983)	Crimes in Mind (1985)

Professional ratings
Review scores
Source	Rating
AllMusic	3.5/5 stars

1st is the debut album by American rock band Streets, released in 1983. The lead single "If Love Should Go" peaked at number 6 on the Billboard Mainstream Rock Airplay chart (then named "Top Rock Tracks") in January 1984.

== Track listing ==
All tracks are written by Steve Walsh except where noted.

No.	Title	Writer(s)	Length
1.	"If Love Should Go"	Mike Slamer, Walsh	4:10
2.	"Move On"		3:50
3.	"One Way Street"		4:49
4.	"Lonely Woman's Cry"		5:40
5.	"Everything Is Changing"		3:12
6.	"Cold Hearted Woman"	Marty Conn	3:25
7.	"So Far Away"		4:02
8.	"Blue Town"	Tim Gehrt, Billy Greer, Slamer, Walsh	3:31
9.	"Fire"	Gehrt, Slamer, Walsh	5:06
Total length:			37:45

== Personnel ==
- Steve Walsh – synthesizer, keyboards, lead vocals
- Billy Greer – bass, vocals
- Mike Slamer – guitar
- Tim Gehrt – percussion, drums, vocals

=== Production ===
- Neil Kernon - engineer, producer, mixing
- Ted Jensen - mastering
- Chuck Fedonczak - assistant engineer
- Bruce Buchhalter - assistant engineer, mixing engineer
- Basic tracks recorded at Axis Studios, GA
- Overdubs and vocals recorded at Electric Lady Studios, New York, NY
- Mastered at Sterling Sound
- Art direction - Karen Katz
- Illustration - Willardson & White Studio

== Charts ==
The album spent 11 weeks on the charts, while the single spent 5 weeks on the pop charts, and twelve weeks on the Mainstream Rock chart.

Album – Billboard (United States)

Year	Chart	Position
1983	Billboard 200	166

Singles – Billboard (United States)

Year	Single	Chart	Position
1983	"If Love Should Go"	Pop Singles	87
1983	"If Love Should Go"	Billboard Hot 100	87
1984	"If Love Should Go"	Mainstream Rock Songs	6
