= Khymera =

Italian and US hard rock band

Khymera is a melodic hard rock and AOR band. The group has released six albums, all on Italian label Frontiers Records/Frontiers Music.

International in its inception, the group was led by Italian keyboardist Daniele Liverani with Steve Walsh as singer. Walsh passed the torch to American bass player Dennis Ward, who took up the vocals in Khymera after their first album.

== Members ==
=== Current Members ===
- Dennis Ward - vocals, bass (2004–present)
- Michael Klein - guitar (2012–present)
- Eric Ragno - keyboards (2014–present)
- Michael Kolar - drums (2012–present)

=== Former Members ===
- Steve Walsh - vocals (2002–2006)
- Uriah Duffy - bass (2002–2004)
- Brian MacLeod - drums (2002–2004)
- Dario Cicconi - drums (2002–2012)
- Tommy Ermolli - guitarist (2002–2012)
- Jim Rykbost - keyboard (2006–2014)
- Daniele Liverani - guitar, keyboard, bass (2002–2018)

== Discography ==
- Khymera (2003)
- A New Promise (2005)
- The Greatest Wonder (2008)
- The Grand Design (2015)
- Master Of Illusions (2020)
- Hold Your Ground (2023)
