= Monolith (Kansas album) =

Studio album by Kansas
- Released: May 1979
- Recorded: January – April 1979
- Studios: Axis Studios and Apogee Studios, Atlanta, Georgia
- Genres: Progressive rock; pop rock
- Length: 41:43
- Labels: Kirshner/CBS, Epic
- Producer: Kansas

Kansas chronology
Two for the Show (1978)	Monolith (1979)	Audio-Visions (1980)

Singles from Monolith
- 1. "People of the South Wind" Released: May 1979; 2. "Reason to Be" Released: August 17, 1979

Monolith is the sixth studio album by American progressive rock band Kansas, released in 1979 (see 1979 in music). The album reached No. 10 on the Billboard album charts, marking their third straight (and last) studio album to reach the top ten.

== Overview ==
Their first studio album to be produced by the band themselves, Monolith would be the third studio album release by Kansas to rank in the Top Ten of the Billboard album chart. However, Monolith would prove to be a commercial disappointment in the face of bad reviews and the lack of a high-impact hit single. The lead single "People of the South Wind" stalled in the Top 30 of the Billboard Hot 100 in August 1979, causing the rush release of "Reason to Be" as the second single: much-likened to Kansas' signature hit "Dust in the Wind", "Reason to Be" would nowhere near approximate that 1978 Top Ten hit's success, the Hot 100 peak of "Reason to Be" being #52.

On their 80-city US tour, the band's set list featured the entire album early in the tour, though by the time the tour ended, about half the songs had been cut from the live set in favor of older numbers. A national broadcast of their show at Alpine Valley, Wisconsin on this tour featured the entire album and is one of the most popular unissued live recordings of the band. Believing that fans didn't like Monolith, they did not perform any of the songs again until the mid-1990s, when they revived "People of the South Wind" and "Reason to Be" briefly. The opening track, "On the Other Side", has since been featured in performances on and off on tours, including for the Device – Voice – Drum DVD, although not appearing on the DVD itself. With the arrival of a revamped lineup over the past 5 years, songs such as "Reason to Be" and "People of the South Wind" have been added to the setlist at various times.

Following the US Monolith tour, the band had its first tour of Japan, in January 1980. The band performed four songs from Monolith on their Japanese tour: "People of the South Wind," "Stay Out of Trouble," "How My Soul Cries Out for You" (the set closer featuring a dramatic performance including a body dropping from the ceiling), and "On the Other Side" (which was released as an edited picture sleeve single in Japan). A special promotional album entitled Kansas Monolith Tour 1980 in Japan was issued to radio stations there to publicize the dates and featured three songs from Monolith and five of their earlier popular songs.

Monolith initially sold about 800,000 copies, obtaining gold status, but ultimately went platinum in the early 1990s. Kerry Livgren donated his platinum record to the Kansas State Historical Society. The album stayed on the Billboard album chart for a total of 24 weeks, and was one of the Top 100 charting albums (#100) for the calendar year 1979.

Even though MTV was still two years away, promotional music videos were produced for four tracks on Monolith: "On the Other Side", "People of the South Wind", "Away from You", and "Reason to Be".

Livgren's lyrics on Monolith were partly influenced by The Urantia Book, of which he was a devotee before his conversion to Christianity.

== Cover art ==
As Phil Ehart, drummer for the band Kansas, shared with Jeb Wright (a legendary rock radio and print interviewer) in a Goldmine interview called "Behind the Paintbrush", Ehart told stories about the artwork for Kansas album covers, including Monolith:

Bruce Wolfe, an artist that did a Levi’s commercial, did that album cover. He had done one of the first animated commercials on television. By the time CBS approached him, he had been doing some album covers. We had sent him the song “People of the South Wind” and he sent back this fricking painting … it was huge. It was not a drawing; it was a real painting of this Indian whose headdress was a space helmet. There were all of these overpasses that were broken and there were a bunch of Indians on the back that looked like they were at a Boy Scout camp or something. He did an incredible job. He took our logo and made it work. It was always a challenge to take that logo and make it look cool. He used the features on it and it really worked. Again, what an icon … it was a 9-foot-tall Native American chief wearing some sort of buffalo robe and a space helmet with horns. The guy must have done a lot of drugs, but we thought it was really cool.

== Release history ==
The album was remastered and reissued in 2011, as a Japanese import vinyl-replica Blu-spec CD (Epic EICP 20078) including the rarity live version of "On the Other Side" previously available only on the 1994 Legacy-issued Box Set. A domestic version of the remaster was released in standard CD format in the US as part of Legacy Recordings' Classic Album Collection series which included all of their Kirshner/CBS studio releases. A Dutch-issued "Music on CD" series released the album on CD in 2016. It was last of the albums with the original lineup to be re-released on vinyl. Three different colored vinyl versions appeared in 2018 and 2019.

== Reception ==
Professional ratings
Review scores
Source	Rating
AllMusic	2/5 stars
MusicHound Rock: The Essential Album Guide	3/5 stars
The Rolling Stone Album Guide	1/5 stars

The album received negative reviews. John Swenson of Rolling Stone, who had previously reviewed Point of Know Return, was far less pleased with Monolith, particularly criticizing the album's pretentiousness ("this band is just an American version of the Moody Blues and Emerson, Lake and Palmer: "serious" music that turns up its nose at rock & roll's expressiveness and substitutes bombast for emotion.") and the awkward hemming and hawing lyrics (citing "And if I seem too inconclusive/It's just because it's so elusive" as an example).

Steve Bond in the Los Angeles Times opined that while Kansas had fulfilled its inaugural promise as heir apparent to prog rock veterans Yes and Emerson Lake & Palmer with their 1977 breakout hit "Carry On Wayward Son", Monolith would indicate that "success [has] bred complacency", the album lacking the "variety and spice" of the band's precedent output: "[Although Kansas'] six members are all solid musicians who can dish out reasonably inventive, attractively textured rock & roll [they] apparently can't resist the temptation to recreate the overblown, showy instrumentals and ponderously empty lyrics symptomatic of those [prog rock veterans] at their worst."

Robert Taylor of AllMusic retrospectively commended the band's fine playing while criticizing an exhaustion of their musical style and an overall lack of direction. He particularly criticized the "juvenile" lyrics and a shifting focus towards mainstream radio.

Record World said of the single "Reason to Be" that "Dramatic vocals and extravagantly produced instrumental colors make a moving statement."

== Track listing ==
Side one
No.	Title	Writer(s)	Length
1.	"On the Other Side"	Kerry Livgren	6:26
2.	"People of the South Wind"	Livgren	3:41
3.	"Angels Have Fallen"	Steve Walsh	6:39
4.	"How My Soul Cries Out for You"	Walsh	5:49

Side two
No.	Title	Writer(s)	Length
5.	"A Glimpse of Home"	Livgren	6:37
6.	"Away from You"	Walsh	4:26
7.	"Stay Out of Trouble"	Walsh, Rich Williams, Robby Steinhardt	4:15
8.	"Reason to Be"	Livgren	3:51

Bonus track on 2011 Japanese import vinyl-replica Blu-spec CD
No.	Title	Length
9.	"On the Other Side" (Live in 1979; previously released on the Legacy Kansas Boxed Set)	6:44

== Personnel ==
Kansas

- Steve Walsh – keyboards, lead and backing vocals
- Robby Steinhardt – violin, backing vocals, lead vocals on "Angels Have Fallen," "How My Soul Cries Out for You," and "Stay Out of Trouble," anvil
- Kerry Livgren – guitars, keyboards
- Rich Williams – guitars
- Dave Hope – bass
- Phil Ehart – drums

Additional musicians

- The O. K. Chorale – background vocals on "Angels Have Fallen"

Production

- Kansas – producer, cover concept
- Brad Aaron, Davey Moiré – engineers, mixing at Capricorn Studios, Macon, Georgia
- Les Horn, Steve Tillisch, David Pinkston – assistant engineers
- Tom Drennon – art direction and design
- Bruce Wolfe – illustration
- Neal Preston – photography

== Charts ==
Chart (1979)	Peak position
Australian Albums (Kent Music Report)	69
Canada Top Albums/CDs (RPM)	18
French Albums (SNEP)	14
Swedish Albums (Sverigetopplistan)	27
US Billboard 200	10

== Certifications ==
Region	Certification	Certified units/sales
Canada (Music Canada)	Gold	50,000^{^}
United States (RIAA)	Platinum	1,000,000^{^}
^{^} Shipments figures based on certification alone.
