= Crimes in Mind =

Studio album by Streets
- Released: March 1985
- Recorded: 1984
- Genre: Hard rock
- Length: 36:38
- Label: Atlantic
- Producer: Beau Hill

Streets chronology
1st (1983)	Crimes in Mind (1985)	King Biscuit Flower Hour Presents Streets (1997)

Professional ratings
Review scores
Source	Rating
AllMusic	3/5 stars

Crimes in Mind is the second and final studio album by Streets. It was released in March 1985.

== Track listing ==
All tracks are written by Mike Slamer and Steve Walsh except where noted.

No.	Title	Writer(s)	Length
1.	"Don't Look Back"	Randy Goodrum, Slamer, Walsh	3:22
2.	"The Nightmare Begins"	Goodrum, Slamer, Walsh	3:16
3.	"Broken Glass"	Goodrum, Slamer, Walsh	3:54
4.	"Hit 'N Run"		3:08
5.	"Crimes In Mind"		3:38
6.	"I Can't Wait"	Walsh	3:46
7.	"Gun Runner"		3:44
8.	"Desiree"		3:50
9.	"Rat Race"	Goodrum, Slamer, Walsh	3:27
10.	"Turn My Head"		4:33

== Personnel ==
- Steve Walsh - synthesizer, keyboard, lead vocals
- Tim Gehrt - percussion, drums, vocals
- Billy Greer - bass, vocals, lead vocals (track 9)
- Mike Slamer - guitar

== Notes ==
Mike Slamer re-cut "The Nightmare Begins" with his band Steelhouse Lane for their 1999 second album Slaves of the New World.

== Charts ==
Chart (1985)	Peak position
US Billboard 200	204
