= Wild Ocean =

Studio album by John Hughes
- Released: 11 October 2004 United Kingdom; 22 October 2004 Ireland
- Recorded: Westland Studio, Dublin; Westmill Lane Studio, Dublin
- Genre: Celtic
- Label: 14th Floor Records; Warner; Spokes
- Producer: John Hughes; Billy Farrell; Anthony Drennan

John Hughes chronology
Wild Ocean (2004)	The Mandela Suite (2009)

Wild Ocean is the debut album by John Hughes, released in October 2004. The album features many well known Irish musicians, such as The Chieftains and The Corrs. It also launched the solo career of Tara Blaise, who co-wrote and provided vocals for two songs on the album.

The album was rereleased in 2009.

== Track listing ==
1. "Deo"
2. "Dancing in the Wind"
3. "The Opus Tree"
4. "Horizon"
5. "Beannacht Leat"
6. "Casa Torres"
7. "Come Away"
8. "Prelude"
9. "Lament"
10. "The Phoenix"
11. "Dreamtime"
12. "Slipstream" (Japan only bonus track)

All tracks written by John Hughes, except tracks 2 and 7, written by John Hughes and Tara Blaise.

== Credits ==
- Tara Blaise − Lead Vocals, Backing Vocals
- Kevin Conneff − Bodhran
- Andrea Corr − Backing Vocals, Tin whistle
- Caroline Corr − Backing Vocals, Drums, Bodhran
- Jim Corr − Backing Vocals, Guitar, Piano
- Sharon Corr − Backing Vocals, Violin
- John Dexter Ensemble − Choir
- Anthony Drennan − Guitar
- Keith Duffy – Bass guitar
- Billy Farrell − Programming, Keyboards
- Finbar Furey − Uilleann pipes
- Brian Furlong − Tin Whistle, Low whistle
- John Hughes − Additional guitar
- Sean Keane − Violin
- Matt Molloy − Flute
- Paddy Moloney − Uilleann pipes, Tin whistle
- Fiachra Trench − Orchestra arranged and conducted by,
- Caitriona Walsh − Orchestra Manager
