= Young Men Gone West =

Studio album by City Boy
- Released: 1977
- Genres: Pop rock, progressive rock
- Length: 41:13
- Labels: Vertigo (Europe); Mercury (USA)
- Producer: Robert John "Mutt" Lange

City Boy chronology
Dinner at the Ritz (1976)	Young Men Gone West (1977)	Book Early (1978)

Young Men Gone West is the third album by British band City Boy. It was released in 1977 on Vertigo Records in Europe and on Mercury Records in the United States and Canada.

== Critical reception ==
Professional ratings
Review scores
Source	Rating
AllMusic	4/5 stars
The Encyclopedia of Popular Music	3/5 stars
Music Week	2/4 stars
The New Rolling Stone Record Guide	2/5 stars

The New Rolling Stone Record Guide wrote that the album "provided the group's finest, liveliest playing and writing, and made tentative steps toward a unique style."

In his regular reviews for Truck & Driver magazine, starting a four of five star review, Shaun Connors wrote, "City Boy are probably most known for their 1978 Top 10 single 5.7.0.5. and little else, but there is so much more to this Midlands 1970s proggy-poprock outfit than the one-hit wonder status they are so unfairly labelled with... As two double-CDs, the first four of seven City Boy albums have been reissued by Cherry Red, this offering by far the most accomplished and listenable of the two."

== Track listing ==
Side 1

1. "Dear Jean (I'm Nervous)" (Lol Mason, Mike Slamer) - 5:33
2. "Bordello Night" (Steve Broughton) - 3:04
3. "Honeymooners" (Lol Mason, Mike Slamer) - 3:55
4. "She's Got Style" (Lol Mason, Max Thomas) - 3:23
5. "Bad for Business" (Lol Mason, Steve Broughton) - 3:33

Note: On American and Canadian issues the two first tracks are in reverse order, i.e. "Bordello Night" before "Dear Jean".

Side 2

1. "Young Men Gone West" (Lol Mason, Max Thomas) - 4:05
2. "I've Been Spun" (Steve Broughton) - 3:19
3. "One After Two" (Lol Mason, Max Thomas) - 3:27
4. "The Runaround" (Lol Mason, Steve Broughton) - 3:16
5. "The Man Who Ate His Car" (Bishton, Max Thomas) - 3:00
6. "Millionaire" (Lol Mason, Steve Broughton) - 4:28

== Personnel ==
- Lol Mason – lead and backing vocals
- Mike Slamer – electric and acoustic 12-string guitars, lead vocals, mandolin
- Steve Broughton – acoustic 6-string guitars, lead and backing vocals
- Max Thomas – keyboards, lead and backing vocals, piano, harmonium, organ, synthesizer
- Chris Dunn – bass guitar, guitar
- Tony Braunagel – drums, percussion

== Cherry Red reissue ==
Cherry Red's Lemon Recordings announced in May 2015 plans to reissue City Boy's first four album releases as double CDs with bonus tracks. Release date was set for 17 July 2015.

Young Men Gone West (disc 1) and Book Early (disc 2) are complemented by two bonus tracks on disc 2. New sleeve notes are provided by Malcolm Dome. Press releases inform these releases are re-mastered from original tapes, and that this is the first official release of these albums on CD.
