= Twinspirits =

Italian progressive metal band

- Origin: Padua, Italy
- Genres: Progressive metal
- Years active: 2002–present
- Label: Lion Music
- Members: Daniele Liverani; Dario Ciccioni; Alberto Rigoni; Tommy Ermolli; Göran Nyström
- Past members: Søren Adamsen

Twinspirits is an Italian progressive metal band from Padua composed of Daniele Liverani, Dario Ciccioni, Alberto Rigoni, Tommy Ermolli, and Göran Nyström. They have released three studio albums: The Music that Will Heal the World (2007), The Forbidden City (2009), and Legacy (2011).

== History ==
Twinspirits was created in 2002 by Daniele Liverani, who had just wrapped up another project, Genius: A Rock Opera, in which he played guitar, bass, and keyboards. Drummer Dario Ciccioni, who had also been part of Genius Rock Opera, again joined Liverani, and they recruited guitarist Tommy Ermolli and bassist Alberto Rigoni. Lastly, they hired Danish singer Søren Adamsen for vocal duties.

The band released their debut album, The Music that Will Heal the World, in June 2007, and planned an Italian tour to support it. For personal reasons, Søren was unable to take part in the tour and left the group a year later. He was replaced by Swedish vocalist Göran Nyström.

Following the tour, Twinspirits began work on their sophomore album, The Forbidden City, which was released on 11 September 2009. After touring Italy once more, Liverani, Ciccioni, and Ermolli formed a side project named Prime Suspect.

A third Twinspirits album, titled Legacy, was released on 18 February 2011. It was well received by the press, with Kenn Jensen of Powerofmetal.dk stating that "Legacy is without a doubt the best album Daniele Liverani has ever written."

== Band members ==
Current

- Daniele Liverani – keyboards
- Dario Ciccioni – drums, percussion
- Alberto Rigoni – bass
- Tommy Ermolli – guitar
- Göran Nyström – vocals

Past

- Søren Adamsen – vocals

== Discography ==
=== Studio albums ===
Year	Title
2007	The Music That Will Heal the World
2009	The Forbidden City
2011	Legacy
