= Essenza =

Italian heavy metal band

- Origin: Italy
- Genres: hard rock, heavy metal
- Years active: 1993 - present
- Labels: SG Records
- Members: Carlo G. Rizzello; Alessandro S. Rizzello; Paolo Colazzo
- Past members: Luca A. Rizzello
- Website: www.essenzamanagement.com

Italy has just produced the new Rush.

— Simon Williams on DSD Magazine

Essenza is a heavy metal band formed in Italy in 1993, led by the guitarist Carlo G. Rizzello and his brother Alessandro (bass player). At the beginning, Luca A. Rizzello played drums in the trio. Since 2003 Paolo Colazzo joins the band as drummer. The first two full lengths of the band were sung in Italian and were strongly influenced by traditional hard rock and rock-blues; later, the band adopted English lyrics and switched to a classic metal style that resembles Black Sabbath, Judas Priest and Iron Maiden mixed to the speed and the heaviness typical of the Megadeth sound.

== Discography ==
=== Albums ===
- 2000 - Suggestioni
- 2002 - Contrasto
- 2009 - Devil's Breath
- 2014 - Blind Gods and Revolutions

=== EP, demo, live ===
- 1996 - Essenza, demo
- 1998 - Algoritmo 60, demo
- 2007 - Dance of liars, EP

=== Official videoclips ===
- 2007 - deep into your eyes
- 2009 - devil's breath
- 2014 - bloody spring

== Members ==
=== Current members ===
- Carlo G. Rizzello – Vocals and Guitars
- Alessandro S. Rizzello - Bass
- Paolo Colazzo - Drums

=== Past members ===
- Luca A. Rizzello – Drums (1993–2003)
