= Shadowman (Steve Walsh album) =

Studio album by Steve Walsh
- Released: June 28, 2005
- Genre: Progressive rock
- Length: 48:54
- Label: 33rd Street Records

Steve Walsh chronology
Glossolalia (2000)	Shadowman (2005)

Professional ratings
Review scores
Source	Rating
Allmusic	3/5 stars

Shadowman is a 2005 solo album by Steve Walsh.

== Track listing ==
1. "Rise" – 5:15
2. "Shadowman" – 6:44
3. "Davey and the Stone That Rolled Away" – 5:54
4. "Keep On Knockin" – 5:53
5. "Pages of Old" – 4:54
6. "Hell is Full of Heroes" – 6:03
7. "After" – 9:58
8. "The River" – 4:13
9. "Faule dr Roane" – 8:12 (2007 re-release bonus track)
10. "Dark Day" – 5:36 (2007 re-release bonus track)

== Personnel ==
- Steve Walsh - keyboards, vocals
- Joel Kosche - guitars, bass
- Joe Franco - drums, electronic percussion
- Michael Romeo - giga symphony
- David Ragsdale - violin on "After" & "Dark Day"
- Matt Still - percussion on "Pages of Old"
