= 5.7.0.5. =

Single by City Boy

from the album Book Early
- B-side: "Bad for Business"
- Released: 1978
- Recorded: 1978
- Length: 3:11
- Label: Mercury (US); Vertigo (UK)
- Songwriters: Lol Mason; Steve Broughton
- Producer: Robert John Lange

City Boy singles chronology
| "Turn On to Jesus" (1978) | "5.7.0.5." (1978) | "What a Night" (1978) |

"5.7.0.5." (also "5-7-0-5") is a song recorded by the British rock group City Boy and written by group members Lol Mason and Steve Broughton. The song was first released as a single in 1978 and then as the first track on the group's fourth album, Book Early (1978).

"5.7.0.5." was City Boy's most successful song, reaching number eight on the UK Singles Chart. The single peaked at number 27 on the U.S. Billboard Hot 100 for the week ending 14 October 1978, and charted in other countries.

The song was first recorded with different lyrics and with the title "Turn On to Jesus", and was released as a single earlier in 1978. However, this single was withdrawn. The new lyrics included part of a phone number as the title and chorus.

== Charts ==
=== Weekly charts ===
Weekly chart performance for "5.7.0.5."
| Chart (1978) | Peak position |
|---|---|
| Australia (Kent Music Report) | 11 |
| Canada (RPM (magazine) | 55 |
| Ireland (IRMA) | 6 |
| New Zealand (Recorded Music NZ) | 21 |
| Norway (VG-lista) | 6 |
| Sweden (Sverigetopplistan) | 11 |
| UK Singles (OCC) | 8 |
| US Billboard Hot 100 | 27 |

=== Year-end charts ===
Year-end chart performance for "5.7.0.5."
| Chart (1978) | Position |
|---|---|
| Australia (Kent Music Report) | 61 |

== Certifications ==
| Region | Certification | Certified units/sales |
|---|---|---|
| United Kingdom (BPI) | Silver | 250,000^{^} |
^{^} Shipments figures based on certification alone.
