= One Week of Days =

Musical duo from Ireland

- Origin: Kilkenny, Ireland
- Genres: Christian rock
- Years active: 2000–present
- Label: Zoe Life Music
- Spinoff of: Kaydee
- Members: Bob Murphy; Jan Murphy
- Website: www.oneweekofdays.com

One Week of Days are a husband and wife duo from Kilkenny, Ireland.

== History ==
Bob and Jan had worked together in other groups including Kaydee. In 2000, the couple married and began recording their album "Who You Really Are" under the name One Week of Days.

One Week of Days have announced that they are currently recording their second album and a pre-release single is due out during 2009.

== Members ==
- Jan Murphy ( Vocals )
- Bob Murphy ( Vocals & Multi-instrumentalist)

== Discography ==
=== Album ===
Who You Really Are

- Released: March, 2002
- Format: CD / Digital Download
- Label: Zoe Life Music
- Writer: Bob and Jan Murphy
- Tracks:
1. Who You Really Are 5:37
2. Holy Love 3:12
3. Morning Star 4:09
4. Am I Preachin'? 3:41
5. Lifegiver 5:13
6. Rescue Me 4:51
7. El Shaddai 6:49
8. Let the Light In 6:17
9. Shake My Day 4:38
10. Song of Songs 6:24
11. You Know Best
- Singles:
  - El Shaddai
