= Kaydee =

- Origin: Kilkenny, Ireland
- Genres: Pop rock
- Years active: 1994–1998
- Label: Lime/EMI
- Past members: Kevin Bruce (1994–1998); Joey Shore (1994–1998); Jan Kealy (1994–1997); Bob Murphy (1994–1997); Tara Egan-Langley (1997–1998); Mark McCorry (1997–1998)

Kaydee were a four-piece pop rock band from Kilkenny, Ireland which existed between 1994 and 1998. One member in particular, Tara Blaise, has gone on to have a successful solo career.

== Biography ==
=== Beginnings ===
In 1994, Jan Kealy, Bob Murphy, Kevin Bruce, and Joey Shore started a band called Kaydee, taking the name from the initials 'K.D.'. The lead singer Jan Kealy had been writing songs since the age of thirteen and in an interview with Radio Kilkenny on 28 June, the guitarist Kevin Bruce cited My Bloody Valentine as one of his influences. The band played many times at the Pumphouse Pub and various other venues in Kilkenny. In 1994 the band sent a demo tape to and played a showcase for EMI, and they were signed by A&R man Thomas Black to their Irish subsidiary Lime Records.

With Lime Records "Cradle" was Kaydee's debut single, released on 20 June 1997 and entered the Irish Singles Chart at No.18. During the same month Kaydee recorded a four-song session for Dave Fanning's show on RTÉ 2fm; it was repeated twice during the year.

=== New singer, to the end ===
Kaydee released their second single, "Falling Down", on 5 September 1997, just before Jan Kealy left the band. In October 1997, Tara Egan-Langley (now better known as Tara Blaise) joined Kaydee on vocals from the Wilde Oscars. By this stage Kaydee had changed bassist as well; Bob Murphy had left in early 1997 and was replaced by Mark McCorry, from Purple Ocean.

The band had already recorded what would become their debut album, with Jan Kealy on vocals, so they re-recorded the vocal tracks using Tara Egan-Langley's voice. The band released their third single, "Mr. Sweeney", on 17 April 1998, followed later by their fourth, "Seven Days" on 3 July 1998. Their debut album Stop! I'm Doing it Again (produced by Paul Staveley O'Duffy) was released on 18 August 1998, along with the re-recorded version of "Cradle" as a single.

Kaydee finally decided to disband in October 1998.

=== Present ===
Tara Blaise has gone on to have a successful solo career. Bob Murphy and Jan Kealy got married in 2000 and now both play in One Week of Days.

== Members ==
- Tara Egan-Langley (vocals)
- Kevin Bruce (guitar)
- Mark McCorry (bass)
- Joey Shore (drums)

=== Former members ===
- Jan Kealy (vocals)
- Bob Murphy (bass)

== Discography ==
=== Album ===
Stop! I'm Doing it Again

- Released: 18 August 1998
- Format: CD
- Label: Lime, EMI
- Producer: Paul Staveley O'Duffy
- Tracks:
1. "Cradle" (3:37)
2. "Mr. Sweeney" (4:34)
3. "Eyes" (3:59)
4. "Sense" (5:26)
5. "Seven Days" (4:14)
6. "Once" (4:08)
7. "The Truth" (5:05)
8. "All I Ever Wanted" (4:03)
9. "Falling Down" (4:37)
10. "Carousel" (4:19)
11. "Time Upon Time" (3:45)
12. "Slow Diving" (4:11)
- Bonus tracks:
13. "Walk Away" (3:07) (Japan edition)
14. "On Broadway" (4:07) (Japan edition)
- Singles:
  - "Cradle"
  - "Falling Down"
  - "Mr. Sweeney"
  - "Seven Days"

=== Singles ===
"Cradle" (Jan vocals) from the album ''Stop! I'm Doing it Again''

- Released: 20 June 1997
- Format: CD
- Label: Lime, EMI
- Producer: Paul O'Duffy
- Chart position: No. 18 Irish Singles Chart
- Tracks:
1. "Cradle" (3:37)
2. "Slow Diving" (4:10)
3. "Scream" (2:46)

"Falling Down" from the album ''Stop! I'm Doing it Again''

- Released: 5 September 1997
- Format: CD
- Label: Lime, EMI
- Producer: Paul O'Duffy
- Tracks:
1. "Falling Down" (3:46)
2. "Cradle" (Unplugged) (3:58)
3. "Found" (3:29)

"Mr. Sweeney" from the album ''Stop! I'm Doing it Again''

- Released: 17 April 1997
- Format: CD
- Label: Lime, EMI
- Producer: Paul O'Duffy
- Tracks:
1. "Mr. Sweeney" (4:34)
2. "Slow Diving" (4:10)
3. "Carousel" (4:19)

"Seven Days" from the album ''Stop! I'm Doing it Again''

- Released: 3 July 1998
- Format: CD
- Label: Lime, EMI
- Producer: Paul O'Duffy
- Tracks:
1. "Seven Days" (4:14)
2. "Walk Away" (3:04)
3. "On Broadway" (4:07)

"Cradle" (Tara vocals) from the album ''Stop! I'm Doing it Again''

- Released: August 1998
- Format: CD
- Label: Lime, EMI
- Producer: Paul O'Duffy
- Tracks:
1. "Cradle" (3:36)
2. "Never Replace (5:06)
3. "Tragic Charm" (3:45)
