= Tara Blaise =

Irish female pop, folk, and rock singer

- Born: Tara Egan-Langley; 1 March 1975 (age 51); London, England
- Origin: Ireland
- Genres: Pop folk
- Occupations: Singer actress
- Years active: 1990s–present
- Labels: Spokes Records; DRO/Atlantic (2006)

Tara Blaise (born 1 March 1975) is an Irish female pop, folk, and rock singer. The eldest of six children, Blaise was born in London, but at the age of three moved with her family to Ireland and grew up in Aughrim County Wicklow.

== Biography ==
=== Early career ===
The daughter of an architect and a speech and drama teacher, Tara was introduced to the world of drama and music at a young age, studying speech and drama up to grade eight in the Royal Irish Academy of Music.

Tara Blaise's singing career began at 16 when she formed a band called Les Legumes with school friends, but it was her stint as a backing singer with Dublin band The Wilde Oscars that first brought her to the attention of the Irish music scene.

After The Wilde Oscars came Igloo, having made a name for themselves on the Irish live circuit, they entered the studio and produced well-received singles. Then when much-vaunted band Kaydee sought her out after their singer quit, Blaise agreed to join. The Kaydee album on EMI was re-recorded to feature Tara's vocals and released to very positive reviews. However, despite regular touring including a Midem showcase and a London live club residency, Kaydee never quite hit the big time.

=== Solo career ===
==== Wild Ocean ====
Having just decided to go solo, Tara received a call from a friend who connected her with John Hughes, (manager of The Corrs, musical director of Alan Parker's film of The Commitments, and former musician with Minor Detail).

John Hughes was in the middle of his own instrumental album (Wild Ocean released in October 2004 by 14th Floor Records/Warner UK) and he was looking for a vocalist/lyricist. They collaborated on one track, 'Dancing in the Wind', and the association worked so well that they recorded another, 'Come Away'. Concurrently, Tara took the time to complete a course in Drama at Dublin's Gaiety School of Acting, finishing in time to add vocals to 'Deo', the first single from the album. Tara also appears in the video for 'Deo', shot in County Antrim, including The Giant's Causeway, and in the video for 'Dancing in the Wind'.

==== Dancing on Tables Barefoot ====
John Hughes offered her an album deal on his own Spokes label, and sent her to Los Angeles to work with Corrs producer Olle Romo, resulting in her debut album Dancing on Tables Barefoot. The first Tara Blaise solo single was 'Fool for Love', featuring only Tara's voice and a string quartet.

Both 'Fool for Love' and followup 'Paperback Cliché' were playlisted by BBC Radio 2 in the UK, and Tara covered much ground with a tour of UK regional radio stations, performing with Corrs guitarist Anthony Drennan.

'Paperback Cliché' was a huge radio hit in Ireland, gaining more than 400 plays, and listed at No 2 in the Irish artist airplay chart, and was featured in the movie Tara Road. The album Dancing on Tables Barefoot was released in the summer of 2005, and described by Hot Press as 'a warm and honest record, lit by a genuine sense of personal adventure, and delivered with feeling and panache in equal measure'. The Sunday Times said 'Pretty much everything here could be a single'.

Live shows in the summer of 2005 included The Isle of Wight Festival (where a video was shot for third single 'The Three Degrees'), T in the Park, the Richmond Festival, Yorks, The Secret Garden, V Festivals in Chelmsford & Staffs and in Ireland the Oxegen Festival (Naas, County Kildare). Blaise headlined London's Bush Hall in September 2005, and had her first headlining Irish tour, culminating in a Dublin show at the Sugar Club in November.

A slightly different version of Dancing on Tables Barefoot was released in Spain in February 2006 on the DRO/Atlantic label, part of the Warner Music Group. Their first single was 'The Three Degrees', which reached number 9 in the Spanish airplay Chart. Tara and guitarist Anthony Drennan made various appearances in Spain to promote the album in early March, returning in late June / early July.

In July 2006 Tara toured Spain in support of the second single 'Paperback Cliché', playing a special acoustic concert in Santiago de Compostela, plus live in-store appearances in FNAC (Madrid) and Discos Castello (Barcelona). Accompanied by Irish guitarists Anthony Drennan and Conor Brady, these appearances prefaced future acoustic shows to be announced.

==== Great Escape ====
In March and April 2007 Tara opened for Michael Ball on his 23-date UK tour. Tara released the single 'Fall at the Start' in June 2007 and featured on 'The Tao of Bergerac', a comedy show by Will Smith and Roger Drew on BBC Radio 4 on 15 August 2007 which was later released. In April and May 2008 Blaise opened for Brian Kennedy on his Irish tour. 'Fall at the Start' is also featured on Blaise's second album Great Escape, which was released in May 2008.

Great Escape currently features two singles 'Breathe', and 'Make You'. 'Make You' is produced by Robert John 'Mutt' Lange, a colleague of Olle Romo, and 'Breathe' was released in March with a UK CD release on 8 December 2008. In October 2008 Blaise's website was redesigned.

In 2009 Tara submitted a song as a potential Irish entry to the Eurovision Song Contest 2009. The song was co-written with Billy Farrell and had input from John Hughes. However, the song did not reach the Irish finals.

In January 2010 Blaise was back in the studio recording with Davey MacManus for his new album.

In March 2012 Blaise released her new self-penned single Our New Horizon.

=== Stage and film acting ===
In April 2006 Blaise appeared as 'Beth' in the first stage production of Jeff Wayne's Musical Version of The War of the Worlds alongside Justin Hayward, Russell Watson, and Chris Thompson. The production toured the UK (including the Royal Albert Hall and Wembley Arena where the DVD was shot) and Ireland 13–30 April 2006 and prior to that Tara opened the show at a special concert in Trafalgar Square.

Blaise is part of the cast of the long-running touring play Seven Deadly Sins Four Deadly Sinners produced by Marc Sinden, and in April 2009 performed at the Holder's Season, Barbados and in July 2010 in Guernsey, Channel Islands.

In 2009 Blaise had a part in The Rivals, a show by Richard Brinsley Sheridan at the Abbey theatre. Blaise worked in the short film Dental Breakdown that was shown at the Corona Cork Film Festival in 2009. Tara also appeared in the 2011 short film 'The Opening', written and directed by Luke McManus. The cast included Valerie O'Connor, Barry Ward, and Mark O'Halloran.

=== Work as a model ===
Blaise is also to be featured in an advertising campaign for the Dublin Make-up brand Face2. In late 2008 Blaise was a model featured in an advertising campaign for Tommy Hilfiger in Ireland.

In 2009 Blaise appeared on the RTÉ show Off the Rails.

=== Award nominations ===
At the 2009 Meteor Awards Blaise was nominated in the category Best Irish Female Artist; she lost to Imelda May.

=== The Voice of Ireland ===
Tara surprisingly auditioned for the first series of reality talent show The Voice of Ireland but failed to attract a single coach despite making it through the initial auditions and securing a place at the blind auditions. Her entry in the competition (Bon Jovi's "Livin' on a Prayer") was criticised in the press, as she previously had a professional recording contract.

== Discography ==
=== Albums ===
Year	Title	Notes
2005	Dancing on Tables Barefoot	Reissued in 2006
2008	Great Escape	

=== Singles ===
Year	Title	Album	Charts
2004	'Fool for Love'	Dancing on Tables Barefoot	
2005	'Paperback Cliché'	Dancing on Tables Barefoot	No. 2 Irish airplay
2005	'The Three Degrees'	Dancing on Tables Barefoot	
2005	'The Three Degrees (Remix)'	Dancing on Tables Barefoot	No. 9 Spain
2006	'Unbearable Lightness'	Dancing on Tables Barefoot	
2006	'Paperback Cliché (Remix)'	Dancing on Tables Barefoot	No. 50 Spain
2006	'21 Years'	Dancing on Tables Barefoot	
2007	'Fall at the Start'	Great Escape	
2008	'Breathe'	Great Escape	
2008	'Make You'	Great Escape	

=== Collaborations ===
Year	Title	Artist	Notes
1997	'Great Motivator'	Igloo	As Tara Egan-Langley
1998	Stop! I'm Doing it Again	Kaydee	As Tara Egan-Langley
1998	Wild Ocean	John Hughes	Tara Blaise is featured vocalist on two tracks, 'Come Away with Me' and 'Dancing in the Wind'. She is also featured in the video for 'Deo'.
