= Seventh Key =

US musical group

- Origin: Jacksonville, Florida, U.S.
- Years active: 2001-present
- Label: Frontiers Records
- Members: Billy Greer; Mike Slamer; David Manion; Terry Brock; Pat McDonald
- Past members: Jamie Thompson

Seventh Key is an American rock band formed by Mike Slamer of City Boy and Streets and Billy Greer of Streets and Kansas. They record and perform live during Greer's downtime from Kansas.

The current lineup consists of Greer on bass and lead vocals, Slamer on guitar, bass, keyboards and drums (under the pseudonym "Chet Wynd"), Pat McDonald on drums, David Manion on keyboard, and Terry Brock on guitar and backing vocals. Jamie Thompson (2004) previously played drums, as well as guest appearances by Robby Steinhardt of Kansas on the violin (2005) and Johnny Greer on the mandolin (2005).

== Discography ==
=== Studio albums ===
- 2001 - Seventh Key
- 2004 - The Raging Fire
- 2013 - I Will Survive

=== Live albums ===
- 2005 - Live in Atlanta

Seventh Key discography
- Studio albums: 3
- Live albums: 1
