= King Biscuit Flower Hour Presents Streets =

Live album by Streets
- Released: 1997
- Recorded: October 28, 1983 at Entertainment City in Pittsburgh, PA
- Genre: Pop, rock
- Length: 61:53
- Label: King Biscuit Flower Hour Records, Inc.

Streets chronology
Crimes In Mind (1985)	King Biscuit Flower Hour Presents Streets (1997)

Professional ratings
Review scores
Source	Rating
AllMusic	2.5/5 stars

King Biscuit Flower Hour Presents Streets is a 1983 recording of a Streets concert. The album features Streets live on their first tour, which was in support of the debut album on Atlantic Records. While the band featured the familiar voice of then ex-Kansas lead singer Steve Walsh, who recorded five Top 40 hits with Kansas up to that point, Streets stuck with original tunes even in a live setting such as this.

== Track listing ==
All tracks are written by Steve Walsh, except where noted.

No.	Title	Writer(s)	Length
1.	"Intro (Live)"		0:22
2.	"If Love Should Go (Live)"	Walsh, Mike Slamer	5:11
3.	"Move On (Live)"		3:53
4.	"One Way Street (Live)"		5:49
5.	"Everything Is Changing (Live)"		4:57
6.	"Cold Hearted Woman (Live)"	Marty Conn	3:33
7.	"So Far Away (Live)"		4:49
8.	"Lonely Woman's Cry (Live)"		5:35
9.	"Shake Down (Live)"		4:55
10.	"Fire (Live)"	Walsh, Slamer, Tim Gehrt	11:46
11.	"I'm Not Alone Anymore (Live)"		5:54
12.	"Streets of Desire (Live)"	Randy Goodrum, Slamer, Walsh	5:09

* - "Shake Down," "I'm Not Alone Anymore" and "Streets of Desire" did not appear on either of the two streets albums.

== Personnel ==
- Mike Slamer - guitar
- Steve Walsh - keyboards, lead vocals
- Billy Greer - bass, backing and lead (6) vocals
- Tim Gehrt - drums

== See also ==
- King Biscuit Flower Hour
