= SG Records =

Italian record label

SG Records was an Italian record label, predominantly producing heavy metal. It was founded in 2008 and is based in Monte San Giusto, Italy. The recent discography includes the last works of the Brazilian guitarist Tiago Della Vega, the Italian heavy-rock trio Essenza, Alex Stornello, Daniele Liverani
