= Olle Romo =

Swedish music producer

- Also known as: Zac Bartel
- Origin: Swedish
- Genres: Rock; pop
- Occupations: Music producer; programmer
- Instrument: Drums

Olle Romö is a Swedish music producer, songwriter, and drummer.

Romo rehearsed with Swedish progressive rock group Kaipa in early 1982; however, he left the group after a few weeks to join Eurythmics, and he was a drummer for them from the since 1984 to 1985. He also worked on onetime Eurythmic Dave Stewart's solo albums in the 1990s and was a part of Stewart's Vegas project with Terry Hall. During his career he has been a programmer for producers such as Robert John "Mutt" Lange; on albums including Shania Twain's Come on Over and Bryan Adams' 18 til I Die. His writing credits include co-writing Runaway Train, performed by Elton John and Eric Clapton.

His production credits include Tara Blaise's Dancing on Tables Barefoot and Great Escape, The Corrs' Borrowed Heaven and David Charvet's Leap of Faith amongst others.
