= Billy Greer =

American musician

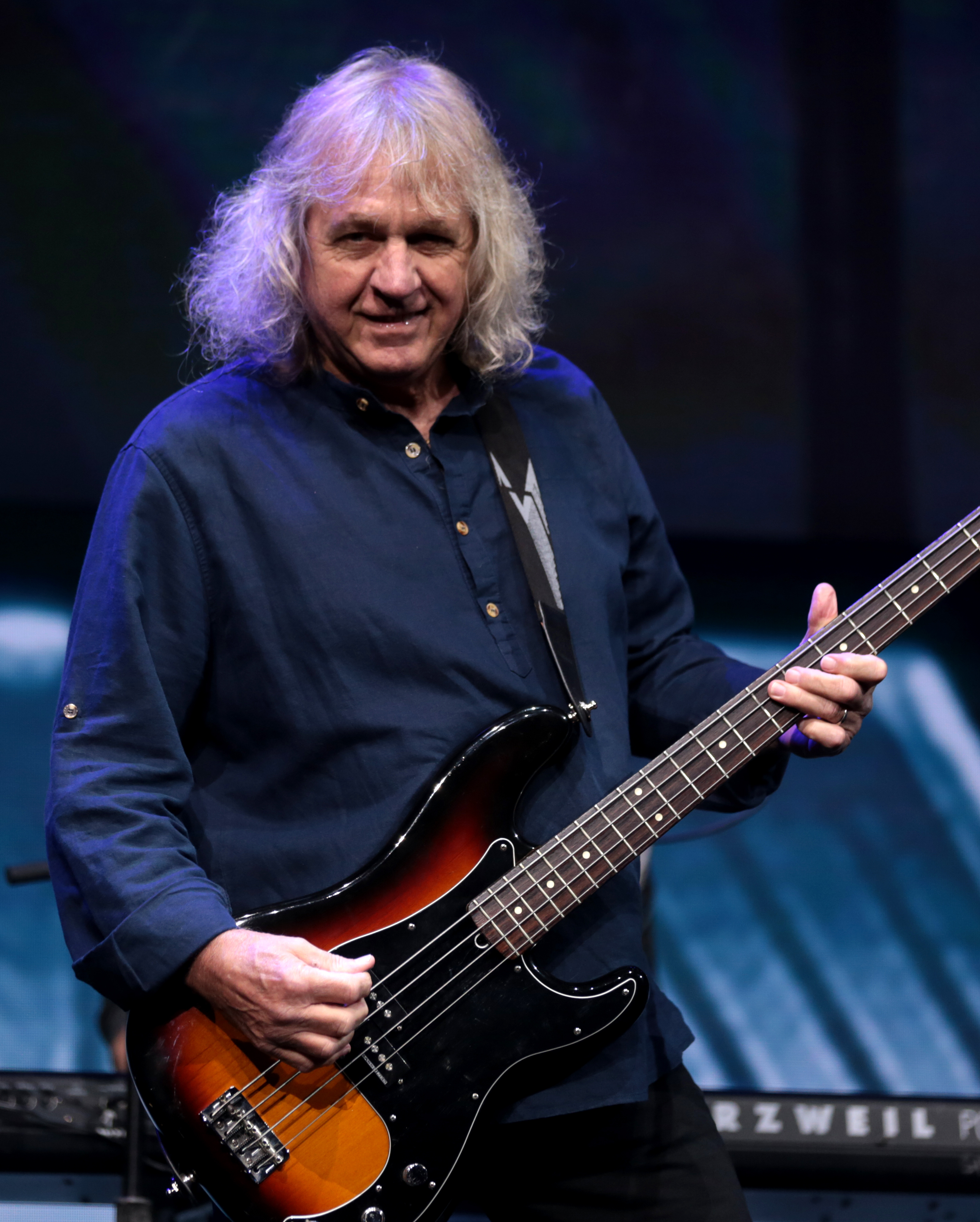
- Greer performing in 2017

Background information
- Born: January 26, 1952 (age 73); Surgoinsville, Tennessee, U.S.
- Genres: Rock, progressive rock
- Occupation: Musician
- Instruments: Bass guitar; vocals
- Website: billygreer.com

Billy Greer (born January 26, 1952) is an American musician who was the bass guitarist for the rock band Kansas from 1985 to 2024. He joined the band when they reformed, making his debut appearance on 1986's Power. He had previously worked with Kansas keyboardist/vocalist Steve Walsh in the band Streets, and works with his own band Seventh Key when not performing with Kansas. He also was a member of the 2009 Kansas side project Native Window along with Kansas members Phil Ehart, Richard Williams, and David Ragsdale.

In addition to performing, Greer manages his son's band 3 Story Fall and produces their music.

== Discography ==
=== Kansas ===
==== Studio albums ====
- Power (1986)
- In The Spirit Of Things (1988)
- Freaks of Nature (1995)
- Always Never the Same (1998)
- Somewhere to Elsewhere (2000)
- The Prelude Implicit (2016)
- The Absence of Presence (2020)

==== Live Albums ====
- Live at the Whisky (1992)
- King Biscuit Flower Hour Presents Kansas (1998)
- Dust in the Wind (2001)
- Device - Voice - Drum (2002)
- There's Know Place Like Home (2009)
- Leftoverture: Live and Beyond (2017)
- Point of Know Return: Live and Beyond (2021)

=== Seventh Key ===
==== Studio albums ====
- Seventh Key (2001)
- The Raging Fire (2004)
- I Will Survive (2013)

==== Live Albums ====
- Live in Atlanta (2005)

=== Streets ===
==== Studio albums ====
- 1st (1983)
- Crimes in Mind (1985)

==== Live Albums ====
- King Biscuit Flower Hour Presents Streets (1997)

=== Native Window ===
==== Studio albums ====
- Native Window (2009)

=== Overland ===
- Epic (2014)
