= Mutt Lange =

South African record producer (born 1948)

- Born: Robert John Lange; 11 November 1948 (age 77); Mufulira, Northern Rhodesia
- Origin: Johannesburg, South Africa
- Genres: Rock; pop; glam metal; pop rock; country pop; country
- Occupations: Record producer; songwriter
- Years active: 1968–present
- Spouses: Stevie Vann (divorced) Olga Anthony (divorced) Shania Twain (m. 1993; div. 2010): Marie-Anne Thiébaud

Robert John "Mutt" Lange (/læŋ/ LANG; born 11 November 1948) is a South African record producer. He is known for his work in rock music as well as co-writing and producing various songs for Shania Twain, his ex-wife. Her 1997 album Come On Over, which Lange produced, is the best-selling country music album, the best-selling studio album by a female act, the best-selling album of the 1990s, and the ninth best-selling album from the United States. He has either been a producer for or worked for artists including AC/DC, Def Leppard, City Boy, the Michael Stanley Band, the Boomtown Rats, Foreigner, Outlaws, Michael Bolton, Heart, the Cars, Bryan Adams, Huey Lewis and the News, Billy Ocean, Celine Dion, Britney Spears, the Corrs, Maroon 5, Lady Gaga, Now United, Nickelback, and Muse.

== Early life ==
Robert John Lange was born in Mufulira, Northern Rhodesia (today Zambia), and grew up in Durban, South Africa. His parents are German. His mother came from a prosperous family, and his father was a mining engineer. Nicknamed "Mutt" at an early age, he grew up a fan of country music, in particular the singer Slim Whitman. While studying at Belfast High School in what is now Mpumalanga province, he started a band in which he played rhythm guitar and sang harmonies.

== Career ==
After his national service (1966–1967), Lange formed the band Sound Reason in 1969, together with James Borthwick, a South African TV, stage, and film actor. In 1971, Lange began the group Hocus, recording one album and releasing five singles.

In 1978, Lange wrote and produced Ipswich Town's FA Cup Final single "Ipswich Get That Goal", his connection with the club due to their South Africa-born player Colin Viljoen. The song is derived from a previous recording, "Give That Thang to Me" by Paul Jones (1977), with some parts rearranged and new lyrics. Beginning production work in 1976, his first major hits came in October 1978 with the UK No. 1 single "Rat Trap" for the Boomtown Rats, followed in July 1979 with AC/DC's hard rock album Highway to Hell (No. 8 UK, No. 17 US). He produced a total of five albums for UK band City Boy from 1976 to 1979.

He produced two more albums with AC/DC, including Back in Black (1980), which is, as of 2026, the second-best-selling album of all time. He also worked with rock group Foreigner on 4, and with Def Leppard on their hit albums, High 'n' Dry, Pyromania, Hysteria and Adrenalize, co-writing most of the songs. After Hysteria, Lange bowed out of working with Def Leppard. In 1999, he returned to working with them in a more limited role, co-writing three tracks for their album Euphoria, which spawned the single "Promises", a Number 1 hit on the mainstream rock charts.

In 1991, he produced Bryan Adams's Waking Up the Neighbours, including co-writing "(Everything I Do) I Do It for You" for the Kevin Costner film Robin Hood: Prince of Thieves which – with 16 consecutive weeks at the top from 7 July to 26 October 1991 – holds the record for the longest number of consecutive weeks at Number 1 in the UK singles chart. Lange produced the single "Make You" from the album Great Escape by Irish singer Tara Blaise which was released in May 2008. In the 2001 television film Hysteria – The Def Leppard Story, actor Anthony Michael Hall portrayed Lange.

== Personal life ==
Lange is a strict vegetarian and a follower of the egalitarian teachings of Sant Mat. He has not given an interview for decades and prefers to live a secluded life, primarily in La Tour-de-Peilz, Switzerland.

Lange met Stevie Vann when the two attended the same school in Northern Rhodesia in the early 1960s, and the two reconnected a few years later while attending Belfast High School in South Africa. They played together in a short-lived band named Hocus, and later married and emigrated to the United Kingdom in the 1970s. The marriage broke down in the 1970s. While married, Lange started a five-year relationship with Oonagh O'Reilly, an Irish-born co-worker. In 1979, he married actress Olga Anthony.

After hearing Shania Twain's music, he got in touch with her, and they spent many hours on the phone. They finally met six months after the initial contact and were married on 28 December 1993. Lange is a teetotaler and, as a result, they had non-alcoholic champagne at their wedding. Lange had the song "(Everything I Do) I Do It for You" performed as a sign of his dedication to Twain. In August 2001, their son was born.

On 15 May 2008, a spokesman for his employer Mercury Nashville announced that Twain and Lange were separating, after Lange had an affair with Twain's then-best friend and secretary Marie-Anne Thiébaud, with whom he reportedly continued the relationship and moved to Switzerland. Lange and Twain divorced in June 2010. On 1 January 2011, Twain married Frédéric Thiébaud, the former husband of Marie-Anne. Lange subsequently married Marie-Anne.

In 2011, Lange purchased Coronet Peak Station located on the mountain and ski field of the same name in Queenstown, New Zealand on South Island. In 2014, he protected 53,000 hectares (130,000 acres) of his land as Queen Elizabeth II National Trust covenant; this is the largest private conservation covenant in New Zealand.

== Discography ==
=== Produced albums ===
Albums on which Lange produced a majority of the tracks:

- Hocus – "The Swan"/"He", 1972
- Richard Jon Smith – Superstar Smith, 1974
- Spider – Spider, 1975
- City Boy – City Boy, 1976
- City Boy – Dinner at the Ritz, 1976
- Kevin Coyne – In Living Black and White, 1976
- Mallard – In a Different Climate, 1976
- Graham Parker – Heat Treatment, 1976
- Supercharge – Local Lads Make Good, 1976
- The Motors – 1, 1977
- City Boy – Young Men Gone West, 1977
- Clover – Love on the Wire, 1977
- Clover – Unavailable, 1977
- Supercharge – Horizontal Refreshment, 1977
- The Boomtown Rats – The Boomtown Rats, 1977
- The Rumour – Max, 1977
- Savoy Brown – Savage Return, 1978
- Michael Stanley Band – Cabin Fever, 1978
- City Boy – Book Early, 1978
- Outlaws – Playin' to Win, 1978
- The Boomtown Rats – A Tonic for the Troops, 1978
- Deaf School – English Boys/Working Girls, 1978
- City Boy – The Day the Earth Caught Fire, 1979
- The Records – Shades in Bed, 1979
- Supercharge – Body Rhythm, 1979
- The Boomtown Rats – The Fine Art of Surfacing, 1979
- AC/DC – Highway to Hell, 1979
- Tycoon – Tycoon, 1979
- Broken Home – Broken Home, 1980
- AC/DC – Back in Black, 1980
- Foreigner – 4, 1981
- Def Leppard – High 'N' Dry, 1981
- AC/DC – For Those About to Rock We Salute You, 1981
- Def Leppard – Pyromania, 1983
- The Cars – Heartbeat City, 1984
- Def Leppard – Hysteria, 1987
- Romeo's Daughter – Romeo's Daughter, 1988
- Billy Ocean – Tear Down These Walls, 1988
- Bryan Adams – Waking Up the Neighbours, 1991
- Def Leppard – Adrenalize (executive producer), 1992
- Michael Bolton – The One Thing, 1993
- Stevie Vann – Stevie Vann, 1995
- Shania Twain – The Woman in Me, 1995
- Bryan Adams – 18 til I Die, 1996
- Shania Twain – Come on Over, 1997
- The Corrs – In Blue, 2000
- Shania Twain – Up!, 2002
- Shania Twain – Greatest Hits, 2004
- Nickelback – Dark Horse, 2008
- Maroon 5 – Hands All Over, 2010
- Muse – Drones, 2015
- Ashley Clark – Ashley Clark, 2015

=== Produced album tracks ===
Albums on which Lange produced at least one track:

- Jessica Jones – "Sunday, Monday, Tuesday", 1972
- Stephen – "Right On Running Man", 1974/5
- Graham Parker and the Rumour – The Parkerilla, 1978
- XTC – "This Is Pop" (single version), 1978
- Roman Holliday – Fire Me Up (executive producer), 1984
- Billy Ocean – Suddenly (executive producer), 1984
- Billy Ocean – Love Zone (executive producer), 1986
- Billy Ocean – Greatest Hits, 1989
- Bryan Adams – So Far So Good, 1993
- Tina Turner – What's Love Got to Do with It, 1993
- Michael Bolton – Greatest Hits, 1995
- Celine Dion – All the Way... A Decade of Song, 1999
- Backstreet Boys – Backstreet's Back, 1997
- Backstreet Boys – Millennium, 1999
- Bryan Adams – The Best of Me, 1999
- Britney Spears – Oops!... I Did It Again, 2000
- Celine Dion – A New Day Has Come, 2002
- Bryan Adams – Room Service, 2004
- Various artists – Music from and Inspired by Desperate Housewives, 2005
- Anne Murray – Anne Murray Duets: Friends & Legends, 2007
- Bryan Adams – 11, 2008
- Tara Blaise – Great Escape, 2008
- Lady Gaga – Born This Way, 2011
- Zander Bleck – Bring It On, 2012
- Bryan Adams – So Happy It Hurts, 2022
- Crossbone Skully - Evil World Machine, 2024
- Crossbone Skully - Thunder Love (feat Phil Collen), 2026
- Crossbone Skully - Condemned To Rock-n-Roll, 2026

=== Album tracks written or co-written ===
- Britney Spears – "Don't Let Me Be the Last to Know" from Oops!...I Did It Again, 2000
- Bryan Adams – "I Will Always Return", "You Can't Take Me" and "This Is Where I Belong" from Spirit: Stallion of the Cimarron, 2002
- Bryan Adams – "So Far So Good" from Anthology, 2005
- Bryan Adams and Sarah McLachlan – "Don't Let Go" from Spirit: Stallion of the Cimarron, 2002
- Bryan Adams, Rod Stewart, and Sting – "All for Love" from The Three Musketeers: Original Motion Picture Soundtrack, 1993
- Bryan Adams – "So Happy it Hurts" from So Happy It Hurts, 2021
- Bryan Adams – "On the Road" from So Happy It Hurts, 2021
- Bryan Adams – "Kick Ass" from So Happy It Hurts, 2021
- Jessica Andrews – "I'll Take Your Heart" from Heart Shaped World, 1999
- Backstreet Boys – "If You Want It to Be Good Girl (Get Yourself a Bad Boy)" from Backstreet's Back, 1997
- Backstreet Boys – "It's Gotta Be You" from Millennium, 1999
- Blackhawk – "I'm Not Strong Enough to Say No" from Strong Enough, 1995
- Michael Bolton – "Only a Woman Like You" from Only a Woman Like You, 2002
- Michael Bolton – "Said I Loved You...But I Lied" from The One Thing, 1993
- Claude François – "Stop, Stop, Stop" and "Without Your Love I Can't Live" from Bordeaux Rosé, 1978
- Clout – "Don't Stop" from Substitute, 1978
- Billy Ray Cyrus – "Only God (Could Stop Me Loving You)" from Storm in the Heartland, 1994
- Celine Dion – "If Walls Could Talk", from: "All the Way... A Decade of Song", 1999
- Dana – "Without Your Love (I Can't Live)" – track produced by Barry Blue from The Girl Is Back, 1979
- Def Leppard – All songs on Pyromania, 1983
- Def Leppard – All songs on Hysteria, 1987
- Def Leppard – "Ring of Fire" and "I Wanna Be Your Hero" from Retro Active, 1993
- Def Leppard – "Promises", "All Night" and "It's Only Love" from Euphoria, 1999
- Dionne Warwick – "Without Your Love" – track produced by Richard Landis from Finder of Lost Loves, 1985
- Claude François – "Without Your Love I Can't Live" and "Stop, Stop, Stop" from Chante En Anglais - Bordeaux Rosé, 1978
- Dobie Gray – "All I Wanna Do Is Make Love to You" from Dobie's self-titled album, 1979
- Girls Next Door – "Without Your Love" from What a Girl Next Door Could Do, 1987
- Heart – "All I Wanna Do Is Make Love to You" and "Wild Child" from Brigade, 1990
- Heart – "Will You Be There (In the Morning)" from Desire Walks On, 1993
- Huey Lewis and the News – "Do You Believe in Love" from Picture This, 1982
- Huey Lewis and the News – "It Hit Me Like a Hammer" from Hard at Play, 1991
- Lonestar – "You Walked In" from Crazy Nights, 1997
- Loverboy – "Lovin' Every Minute of It" from Lovin' Every Minute of It, 1985
- Reba McEntire – "I'll Take Your Heart" from Moments and Memories: The Best of Reba, 1998
- Miss Willie Brown – "You're All That Matters to Me", 2012
- PJ Powers – "(Let That) River Roll" from Thandeka Talk to Me, 2001
- Starship – "I Didn't Mean to Stay All Night" from Love Among the Cannibals, 1989
- Carrie Underwood – "Who Are You" from Blown Away, 2012
- Celtic Woman – "Walk Beside Me", 2015
- Romeos Daughter – "Don't Break My Heart", "I Cry Myself to Sleep at Night", "Wild Child", "Heaven in the Backseat", 1988
- Eddie Money – "Heaven in the Backseat", 1991
- The Corrs – "Breathless", 2000
- Shania Twain – All songs on The Woman in Me (except "Leaving Is the Only Way Out"), Come on Over, and Up!
- Zander Bleck – "Bring It On", 2012
- Radioactive – "Move It", 2022
- Radioactive – "Reset" and "Open Spaces", 2024
- Leah Martin-Brown - "Boys", 2024
- Crossbone Skully - "I'm Unbreakable" from Evil World Machine, 2024
- Crossbone Skully - "The Last Night On Earth" from Evil World Machine, 2024

== Grammy Awards ==
- 1991 – (Everything I Do) I Do It for You by Bryan Adams – Best Song Written Specifically for a Motion Picture or for Television
- 1995 – The Woman in Me by Shania Twain – Best Country Album
- 1998 – You're Still the One by Shania Twain – Best Country Song
- 1999 – Come on Over by Shania Twain – Best Country Song
- 2016 – Drones by Muse – Best Rock Album
