= City Boy (album) =

Studio album by City Boy
- Released: 1976
- Studio: The Manor, Phonogram Studios
- Genre: Progressive pop, progressive rock, glam rock, pop rock
- Length: 45:34
- Label: Vertigo (original UK release); Mercury (original US release); Polydor (original Canadian release); Renaissance Records (2008 reissue); Cherry Red (2015 reissue)
- Producer: Robert John "Mutt" Lange

City Boy chronology
City Boy (1976)	Dinner at the Ritz (1976)

Professional ratings
Review scores
Source	Rating
AllMusic	4/5 stars
Record Mirror	3.5/5 stars

City Boy is the debut album from the English rock band City Boy.

== Track listing ==
No.	Title	Writer(s)	Length
1.	"(Moonlight) Shake My Head and Leave"	Steve Broughton, Lol Mason, Max Thomas	4:25
2.	"Deadly Delicious"	Lol Mason, Mike Slamer	4:39
3.	"Surgery Hours (Doctor Doctor)"		3:04
4.	"Sunset Boulevard"	Steve Broughton, Lol Mason, Max Thomas	6:17
5.	"Oddball Dance"	Chris Dunn, Lol Mason, Mike Slamer, Max Thomas	5:04
6.	"5000 Years/Don't Know Can't Tell"		8:40
7.	"The Hap-Ki-Do Kid"		3:12
8.	"The Greatest Story Ever Told"		4:46
9.	"Haymaking Time"		5:27
Total length:			45:34

== Musicians ==
- Lol Mason – lead vocals, percussion
- Mike Slamer – lead and rhythm guitars, backing vocals
- Steve Broughton – rhythm and 12-string guitars, lead vocals, mandolin, percussion
- Max Thomas – keyboards, backing vocals, 12-string guitar
- Chris Dunn – bass, backing vocals, acoustic guitar
- Roger Kent – drums, percussion

== Personnel ==
- Mick Glossop – Engineer
- Robert John "Mutt" Lange – Producer

== Cherry Red reissue ==
Cherry Red's Lemon Recordings announced in May 2015 plans to reissue City Boy's first four album releases as double CDs with bonus tracks. Release date is set for 17 July 2015.

City Boy (disc 1) and Dinner At The Ritz (disc 2) (City Boy's second album) are complemented by six bonus tracks on disc 1. New sleeve notes are provided by Malcolm Dome.

Press releases inform these releases are re-mastered from original tapes, and that this is the first official release of these albums on CD.
