= City Boy (band) =

English rock band (1974–1982)

- Origin: Birmingham, England
- Genres: Art rock; pop rock; progressive rock; progressive pop; art pop; glam rock
- Years active: 1974–1982
- Labels: Phonogram; Vertigo; Mercury; Atlantic
- Past members: Lol Mason; Steve Broughton (Lunt); Max Thomas; Chris Dunn; Roger Kent; Mike Slamer; Roy Ward

City Boy were an English rock band formed in the mid-1970s. They were originally called Sons of Doloyne, then Back in the Band, and finally City Boy. They featured strong melodies, clever lyrics, complex vocal arrangements, and heavy guitars. The band consisted of Lol Mason (lead vocals), Steve Broughton (lead vocals, guitar), Max Thomas (keyboards, vocals), Chris Dunn (bass, acoustic guitar), Roger Kent (drums), Mike Slamer (lead guitar), and later, Roy Ward (drums, vocals). Their most popular songs were "5.7.0.5.", "What a Night", "The Day the Earth Caught Fire", and "Speechless".

== History ==
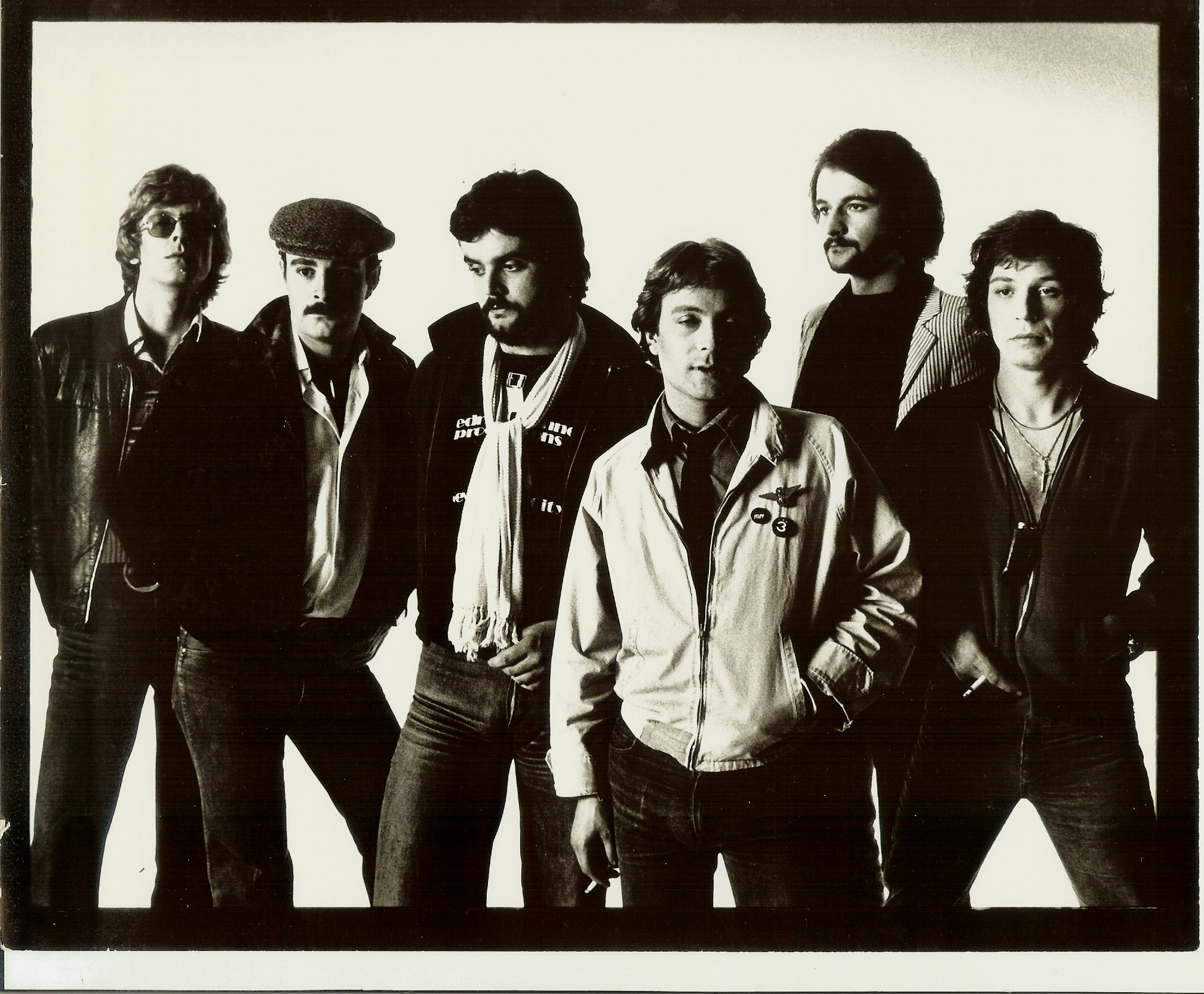
City Boy lineup, ca. 1978, left-to-right: Max Thomas, Chris Dunn, Lol Mason, Steve Broughton, Mike Slamer, Roy Ward

Lol Mason and Steve Broughton (Lunt) met at 7 years of age, at school in Birmingham. They remained friends throughout the years and started writing and recording their early songs in their mid to late teens. In the early 1970s, Mason and Broughton started playing in a few acoustic clubs around the Midlands. At one of these clubs they met guitarist Chris Dunn, who became a third member. Soon thereafter they enlisted Lol Mason's friend, Max Thomas, to play 12-string guitar and bongos. The four of them toured the folk clubs for a while, until around late 1974/early 1975, when they made the decision to turn electric and added Mike Slamer (guitar) and Roger Kent (drums) to the lineup. Soon afterwards they secured a recording contract with Vertigo, a new sub-label of Phonogram Records, and changed their name from Back in the Band, to City Boy.

City Boy's first five albums were produced by Robert John "Mutt" Lange, who was recommended to them by Phonogram A&R guy Chris Peers, and their debut album entitled City Boy, was the first full album that Mutt produced after relocating to the UK from South Africa. Lange became the de facto seventh member of the band, helping Chris Dunn hone his bass guitar skills and assisting with vocal arrangements. "Shake My Head and Leave", City Boy's first single off their eponymously titled debut album, was released in 1975. Their next single, "The Hap-Kido Kid" earned them an appearance on BBC's Top of the Pops.

City Boy's follow up album, Dinner at the Ritz, garnered a positive review from the NME, which wrote, "Not even the highest ballyhoo of praise could do justice to City Boy's masterwork, Dinner At The Ritz...you hear a composing style which has been influenced by, respectfully, Lennon and McCartney, novelist Ian Fleming, and Noel Coward. Very English...but very strange."

Chart success, however, still eluded City Boy. Roger Kent left the band before their third album, Young Men Gone West, and was temporarily replaced, for immediate recording purposes, by session drummer and ex-Crawler member, Tony Braunagel. Despite showing commercial growth this album also failed to supply the hit single they needed. Before the next album, Book Early, Roy Ward became the band's permanent drummer. Book Early yielded the international hit single, "5.7.0.5.", which reached the top 10 in the UK Singles Chart. The single peaked at No. 27 on the U.S. Billboard Hot 100, and was a major hit in many European territories. In support of this album, they toured extensively in Europe and the United States, where they played 66 gigs, 56 of which were with Hall & Oates.

In 1979, City Boy parted ways with their US label, Mercury Records, and signed with Atlantic Records for the US and Canada. Their first album under this new deal, The Day the Earth Caught Fire, received strong reviews and produced a minor hit with the title song. The album marked an early recording appearance by Huey Lewis, who played harmonica on the second track, "It's Only the End of the World". They continued to tour heavily in Europe, the US and Canada. However, this album would prove to be the last album with the six-man lineup.

In December 1979, original members Broughton and Dunn parted ways with the band. The remaining members of the group went on to release their next album, Heads Are Rolling, as a quartet in 1980. The soft rock track "Speechless" made the band briefly popular in the Philippines. Their final album, It's Personal from 1981, failed to attract any attention. Unable to secure a recording contract with any of the major labels, the band split up in 1982.

== After City Boy ==
After the split, Lol Mason formed the Maisonettes and in 1983 had a top ten UK hit with "Heartache Avenue". In 1984, after the breakup of The Maisonettes, Mason concentrated on script writing and, along with his friend Dave Smith, won a Radio Times Comedy Award for their first script, Total Accident. A few years later, Mason's six-part Radio 4 series, Richard Barton: General Practitioner, a hat-tip to his father's hit series Dick Barton: Special Agent, proved to be a big success. Lol's father was Edward J. Mason, the creator and original scriptwriter of The Archers, the UK's longest running radio serial. Coincidentally, Chris Dunn's father, Leslie Dunn, was an actor in The Archers for 27 years and Steve Broughton's aunt also had a recurring part in the show.

Laurence Edward "Lol" Mason died on 30 July 2019 at the age of 69 at his home in Harborne, Birmingham, from a heart attack, after complications following a kidney transplant.

Steve Broughton (Lunt) moved to New York and became a songwriter and producer, under the names Stephen Broughton Lunt and Steve Lunt. He co-wrote Cyndi Lauper's hits "She Bop" and "The Goonies 'R' Good Enough", which was written for the Steven Spielberg movie, The Goonies. He has written and/or produced songs for Britney Spears, Cyndi Lauper, Nick Carter, Aaron Carter, Joan Jett, Jefferson Starship, Peter Frampton, Felix Cavaliere, Brenda K Starr, Junior, and Stacy Lattisaw. He later became Vice President of A&R at Jive Records, where for almost 10 years he was instrumental in the early career of Britney Spears. He was also the responsible A&R executive for *NSync, Justin Timberlake, Backstreet Boys, Nick Carter, Aaron Carter, and Laura Izibor.

After Jive Records, Steve Broughton went on to work as Vice President of A&R at Atlantic Records, where he produced and developed the career of the best selling a cappella group, Straight No Chaser. Broughton recently won 3 awards at the Independent Music Awards in New York, for his writing and production work on Seth Glier's fifth album, Birds.

Mike Slamer went on to record and work as a session musician and staff composer after a stint with American band Streets fronted by Kansas vocalist Steve Walsh in the early to mid-1980s. They recorded two albums for Atlantic Records, 1st and Crimes in Mind. Later with bass player Billy Greer (ex-Streets and ex-Kansas), he formed the band Seventh Key.

Chris Dunn moved back to the UK in 1982 and worked for Zomba on various projects including the Shape Up And Dance roadshow, and was personal manager to Jive Records artists Tight Fit, who had a number one hit with the remake of "The Lion Sleeps Tonight", where Roy Ward was also lead session singer. Dunn then took over managing Battery Studios in London. He went on to found Dreamhire Professional Audio Rentals in the UK and then relocated to the US in 1988 to set up Dreamhire locations in New York and Nashville. He bought out Dreamhire from BMG after they had taken over ownership of Zomba in 2001, and announced his intention to close the business in an interview dated 15 August 2016.

Roy Ward went on to release a remake of Del Shannon's "Runaway" under his band name Tokyo Charm in 1982.

== Selected discography ==
=== Studio albums ===
Year	Album	Chart positions	
Year	Album	US	AUS
1976	City Boy	177	—
1976	Dinner at the Ritz	170	—
1977	Young Men Gone West	—	—
1978	Book Early	115	68
1979	The Day the Earth Caught Fire	—	—
1980	Heads Are Rolling	—	—
1981	It's Personal	—	—
"—" denotes releases that did not chart.

=== Compilation albums ===
- Anthology (2001)
- Anthology (2008)
- Ten Best (2015)
- BBC Live (2015)

=== Singles ===
Year	Title	Peak chart positions			
Year	Title	UK	US	AUS	CAN
1975	"(Moonlight) Shake My Head and Leave"	―	―	―	―
1976	"The Hap-ki-do Kid"	―	―	―	―
1976	"Surgery Hours (Doctor, Doctor)"	―	―	―	―
1976	"Haymaking Time" (US only)	―	―	―	―
1977	"She's Got Style"	―	―	―	―
1977	"I've Been Spun"	―	―	―	―
1977	"The Runaround"	―	―	―	―
1977	"The Violin" (US only)	―	―	―	―
1977	"Turn On to Jesus"	―	―	―	―
1978	"5.7.0.5."	8	27	11	55
1978	"What a Night"	39	―	―	―
1979	"The Day the Earth Caught Fire"	67	―	―	―
1979	"Summer in the Schoolyard" (Scandinavia only)	―	―	―	―
1980	"Mr. Shoes" (Philippines only)	―	―	―	―
1980	"Speechless" (Philippines only)	―	―	―	―
1980	"Heads Are Rolling"	―	―	―	―
1980	"Need a Little Loving"	―	―	―	―
1980	"You're Leaving Me" (US only)	―	―	―	―
1981	"Lovers"	―	―	―	―
"—" denotes releases that did not chart or were not released in that territory.

=== Non-album B-sides ===
- "B.I.T.S." (1975) (sample edits of songs from the first album)
- "Teleulah" (1975)
- "Medicine" (1978)

=== Reissues ===
The German label Bear Tracks reissued the debut album in 1990 on both CD and LP. In 1993, Bear Tracks reissued The Day The Earth Caught Fire and Heads Are Rolling on CD.

In 1998, the first four City Boy albums were reissued in two double-CD sets by Renaissance Records.

In 2004, Renaissance Records reissued the compilation album Anthology.

In 2008, City Boy's first six albums were reissued on CD, for the first time as individual releases, by Renaissance Records. They also re-released the compilation album Anthology, with new cover art.

In October 2009, Renaissance Records released City Boy's seventh and final studio album, It's Personal (1981), for the very first time on CD.

In 2015, Cherry Red's Lemon Recordings reissued the first four albums, again in two double-CD sets, this time remastered from the original master tapes with added bonus tracks and new liner notes.
