= Steve Walsh (musician) =

American singer (born 1951)

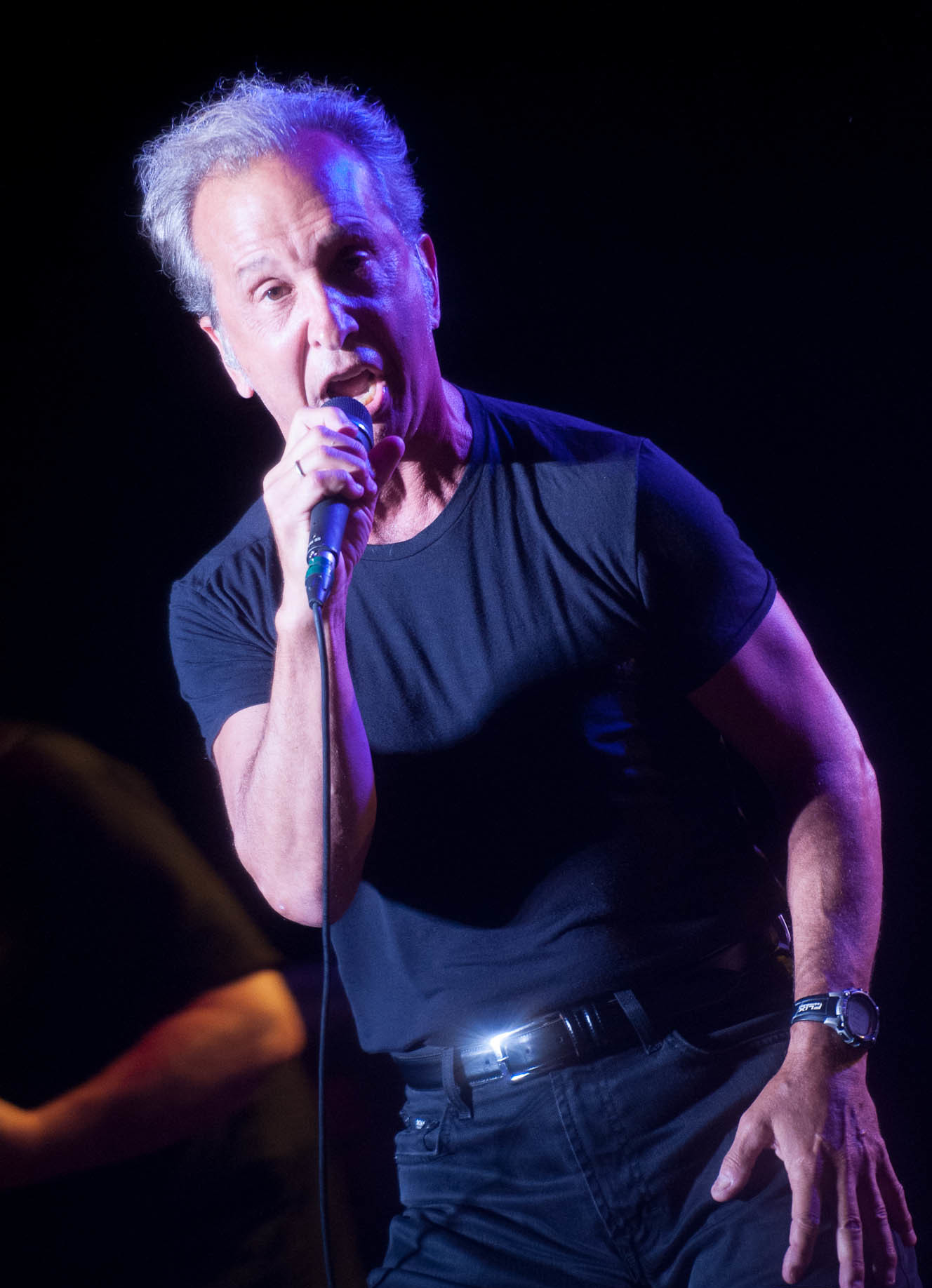
- Walsh performing with Kansas in 2012

Background information
- Born: June 15, 1951 (age 75); St. Joseph, Missouri, U.S.
- Origin: Atlanta, Georgia, U.S.
- Genres: Progressive rock; hard rock
- Occupations: Musician; singer; songwriter
- Instruments: Vocals; keyboards; percussion
- Years active: 1973–present
- Formerly of: Kansas; Streets
- Website: stevewalshrocks.com

Steve Walsh (born June 15, 1951) is an American musician, singer, and songwriter, best known for his work as a longtime member of the progressive rock band Kansas. He retired from the band in 2014. He sings lead on four of Kansas' best-known hits: "Carry On Wayward Son", "Dust in the Wind", "Point of Know Return", and "All I Wanted", the last two of which he co-wrote.

In 2026, Loudwire ranked him as the 7th greatest progressive rock singer of all time.

== Career ==
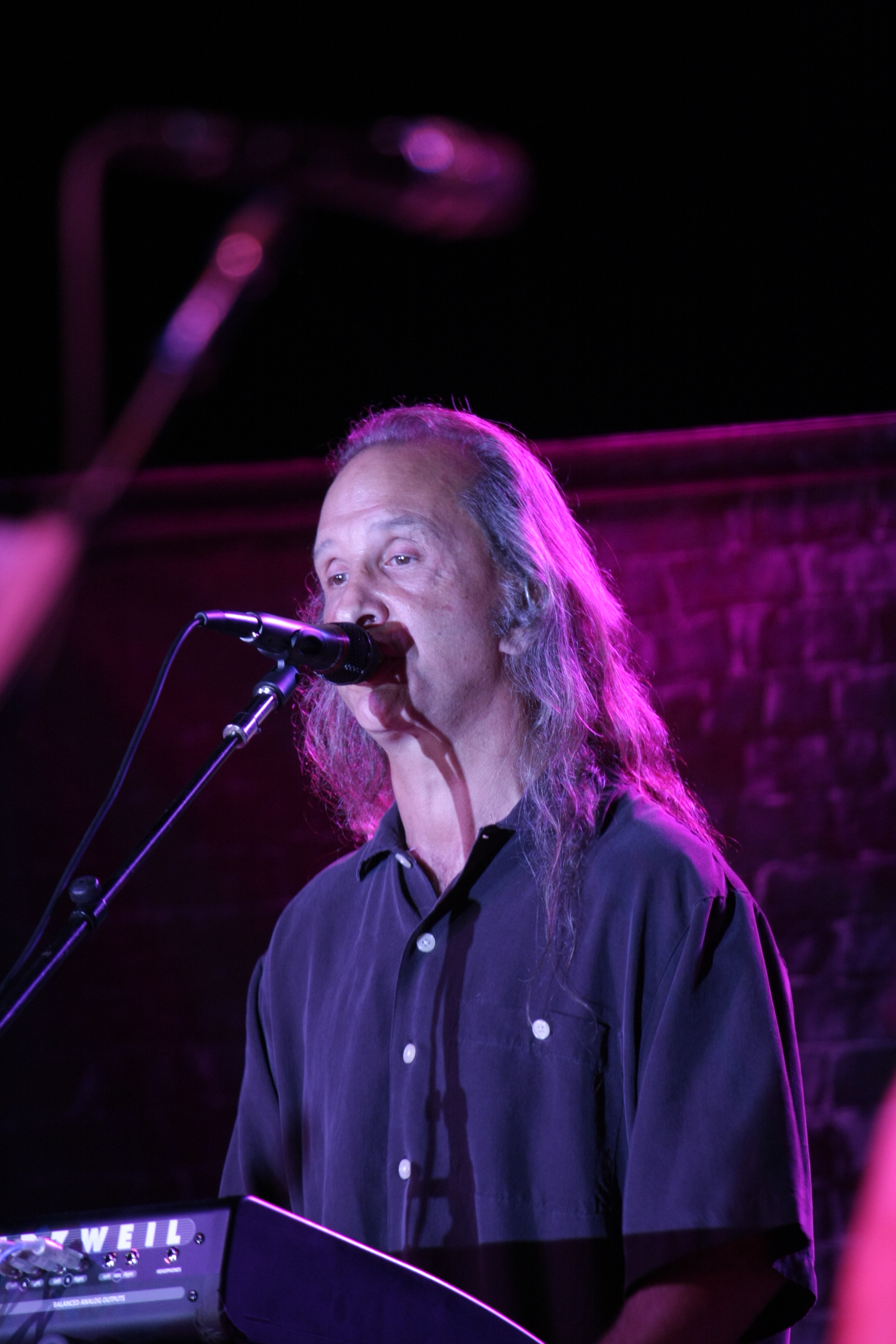
Walsh in 2008

Walsh was in a number of local Topeka groups prior to his joining Kansas, most notably the group White Clover that had reformed after its members had been in 2 earlier bands named Kansas that had split up. White Clover was signed to Don Kirshner's label and the band reverted to the name Kansas (the 3rd line up under this name).

During Walsh's time with the band, Kansas recorded two commercially successful albums, 1976's Leftoverture and 1977's Point of Know Return. With Kansas, Walsh has released 12 studio albums, six live albums, and numerous singles. He has released four solo albums thus far. In 1978 he was invited, along with Kansas drummer Phil Ehart, to play on Steve Hackett's second solo album Please Don't Touch. He sang on two of the LP's songs, "Narnia" and "Racing in A". Hackett released "Narnia" as a single, but not before Walsh's management insisted that Hackett re-cut the track with another vocalist so as not to confuse Kansas fans into believing the track was a new Kansas release. John Perry sang the "Narnia" vocal for the single release version.

Walsh left Kansas after 1980's Audio-Visions due to creative differences with the band's primary songwriter Kerry Livgren. Earlier in 1980, he released his first solo album, Schemer-Dreamer, which included bandmates Livgren, Rich Williams and Phil Ehart, as well as guitarist Steve Morse (who in 1985 joined the revamped Kansas). It contains the song "Every Step of the Way". In 1982 he formed a rock band called Streets with guitarist Mike Slamer, which released the albums 1st in 1983 and Crimes in Mind in 1985 before disbanding.

As a guest vocalist, Walsh has appeared on numerous other artists' recordings.

Kansas replaced Walsh with vocalist John Elefante until their split in 1984, but reformed in 1986 with Walsh as lead singer. He remained with the band until his retirement in 2014.

Walsh released his second solo album Glossolalia in 2000. In 2003 he and Daniele Liverani formed the band Khymera. Walsh sang lead vocals on their first self-titled album. Adding to this album were Billy Greer and former Streets bandmate Mike Slamer. His third solo album Shadowman followed in 2005 (reissued in 2007 with bonus tracks), with the collaboration of Joe Franco on drums, Joel Kosche on guitars and bass, and David Ragsdale on the re-issued version of the album's bonus tracks.

On June 30, 2014, Walsh announced he would retire from Kansas after 41 years.

In 2015, Walsh contributed vocals to the Radioactive album, F4UR, which was released on April 7 that year, and he sang lead on the song "The Piper".

In November 2017, Walsh released a collaborative "solo" album between himself and Tommy Denander on the Escape Music label, entitled Black Butterfly.

== Discography ==
Solo

- (1980) Schemer-Dreamer
- (2000) Glossolalia
- (2005) Shadowman
- (2007) Dark Day & Faule Dr Roane (single releases available only via MP3 download)
- (2017) Black Butterfly

Streets

- (1983) 1st
- (1985) Crimes in Mind
- (1997) King Biscuit Flower Hour Presents Streets or Live-Shakedown

Contributions

- (1978) Steve Hackett – Please Don't Touch
- (1980) Kerry Livgren – Seeds of Change
- (1983) Paul Barrére – On My Own Two Feet
- (1990) Blonz – Blonz
- (1993) Jeff Watson – Around the Sun
- (2000) Vince DiCola – In-Vince-ible!
- (2000) Christmas Collection with Father Rodgers – Remember the One
- (2001) Seventh Key – Seventh Key
- (2001) Trent Gardner – Leonardo – The Absolut Man
- (2001) The December People – Sounds Like Christmas
- (2002) Explorers Club – Raising the Mammoth
- (2002) Daniele Liverani – Genius – A Rock Opera
- (2003) Saint James Parish – Come Home for Christmas
- (2003) Khymera – Khymera
- (2006) Moonstone Project – Time to Take a Stand
- (2010) Joel Kosche – Fight Years
- (2010) Roswell Six – Terra Incognita: A Line in the Sand
- (2015) Radioactive – F4UR
- (2022) LALU – Paint the Sky

Kansas

Studio albums

- (1974) Kansas
- (1975) Song for America
- (1975) Masque
- (1976) Leftoverture
- (1977) Point of Know Return
- (1979) Monolith
- (1980) Audio-Visions
- (1986) Power
- (1988) In the Spirit of Things
- (1995) Freaks of Nature
- (1998) Always Never the Same
- (2000) Somewhere to Elsewhere

Live albums

- (1978) Two for the Show
- (1992) Live at the Whisky
- (1998) King Biscuit Flower Hour Presents Kansas
- (2002) Device, Voice, Drum (CD/DVD)
- (2009) There's Know Place Like Home (CD/DVD)

Compilations

- (1984) The Best of Kansas
- (1992) Carry On
- (1994) The Kansas Boxed Set
- (1999) The Best of Kansas [expanded]
- (1999) Definitive Collection
- (2002) The Ultimate Kansas
- (2004) Sail On: The 30th Anniversary Collection
- (2006) Works in Progress
