= Mike Slamer =

British guitarist (born 1954)

- Also known as: Chet Wynd
- Origin: United Kingdom
- Genres: Hard rock; glam metal; pop rock; progressive rock
- Occupation: Musician
- Instrument: Guitar
- Label: Atlantic

Michael Chetwynd Slamer (/ˈsleɪmər/ SLAY-mər; born 8 July 1954) is a British guitarist.

== Biography ==
Slamer started his career playing in the UK prog-rock band City Boy. Since then, he has worked as a staff composer for various movies and TV series, has been a session guitarist for numerous recording artists, and played in several bands. He provided the guitar solos on Warrant's first two albums, Dirty Rotten Filthy Stinking Rich and Cherry Pie. He also contributed two solos on a Kix record. The songs were “Scarlet Fever” and “Walking Away.”

He at different times cooperated with two members of the progressive rock band Kansas. With Steve Walsh he formed Streets, and with Billy Greer he created the band Seventh Key. Streets released two albums on the Atlantic label, 1st (1983) and Crimes in Mind (1985). A live Streets album was released on the BMG label in 1997 and features a concert for the King Biscuit Flower Hour radio show from 1983. Slamer was also credited as a co-writer for the Kansas song "Refugee" from The Prelude Implicit (2016).

Slamer has also released two albums with the group Steelhouse Lane, plus a solo album entitled Nowhere Land, with former Strangeways member Terry Brock on vocals (2006).

Slamer released an album entitled Devil's Hand with Last in Line vocalist Andrew Freeman (December 2018).

== Discography ==
=== with City Boy ===
- 1976: City Boy
- 1977: Dinner at the Ritz
- 1977: Young Men Gone West
- 1978: Book Early
- 1979: The Day the Earth Caught Fire
- 1980: Heads Are Rolling
- 1981: It's Personal
- 2001: Anthology (compilation)

=== with Streets ===
- 1983: 1st
- 1985: Crimes in Mind
- 1997: King Biscuit Flower Hour Presents Streets or Live-Shakedown

=== with Shopan Entesari ===
- 1996: Cutting Edge Rock

=== with Overland ===
- 2014: Epic

=== with Steelhouse Lane ===
- 1998: Metallic Blue (Avex Trax) (guitar)
- 1999: Slaves of the New World (Escape Music Ltd.) (producer, guitar)

=== Chris Thompson and Mike Slamer ===
- 2001: Won't Lie Down (CD) (guitar)

=== with Seventh Key ===
- 2001: Seventh Key (with Billy Greer) (CD) (producer, guitar)
- 2004: The Raging Fire (with Billy Greer) (CD)
- 2005: Seventh Key Live in Atlanta (with Billy Greer) (CD and DVD)
- 2013: I Will Survive (with Billy Greer) (CD)

=== with Devil's Hand ===
- 2018: Devil's Hand (with Andrew Freeman) (CD) (producer, guitar)

=== Album credits ===
Kix

- 1985: Midnite Dynamite (guitar)

Angry Anderson

- 1990: Blood from Stone (CD) (guitar)

Steve Walsh

- 2000: Glossolalia (CD) (guitar)

Terry Brock

- 2010: Diamond Blue (CD) (producer, guitar)

=== As solo artist (Slamer) ===
- 2006: Nowhere Land (Frontiers Records)
