= Minor Detail (band) =

Irish new wave band

- Origin: Blackrock, Dublin, Ireland
- Genres: Synthpop, new wave
- Years active: 1981–1987
- Labels: Polydor
- Members: John Hughes; Willie Hughes
- Past members: Des Moore; Ray Shulman; Paul McAteer; Morgan Fingleton

Minor Detail were an Irish new wave and synthpop band from Blackrock, Dublin, Ireland.

== Career ==
Minor Detail was headed by brothers John and Willie Hughes. Their lyrical themes were positive and covered topics such as romance and peace. Their self-titled debut album was produced by Bill Whelan (later of Riverdance fame), and they became one of the first Irish bands to secure a recording contract with an American label. However, they were short-lived, splitting in 1984, but reunited for a brief period in 1986–87. In 1991, John Hughes would discover the Corr siblings during an audition for The Commitments and would soon become the Corrs' manager.

== Discography ==
=== Albums ===
- Minor Detail (Polydor POLD 5113, UK 1983)

=== Singles ===
- "Canvas of Life"/"I'll Always Love You" (Polydor, 1983) IRE #25, US #92
- "Canvas of Life"/"Ask the Kids" (Casablanca/Polystar, Japan 1983)
- "Canvas of Life"/"Hold On" (Polydor PRD 218?, US 1983)
- "Canvas of Life"/"Hold On"/"Take It Again" (Japan)
- "Take It Again"/"Living in the 20th Century" (Polydor POSP 679, 1983)
- "She's Back"/"Wait" (RCA MD1, IRL 1986)
