= Daniele Liverani =

Italian musician

Daniele Liverani is an Italian keyboardist and guitarist.

He has been a member of progressive metal bands Twinspirits and Empty Tremor and melodic hard rock band Khymera, and founded the project Genius: A Rock Opera.

With Khymera and Twinspirits member Tommy Ermolli, Liverani released The Cosmic Year under the project name Cosmics in 2008. Liverani also played on Tommy Ermolli's solo project.

His eponymous Daniele Liverani project has released several albums on labels such as Lion Music Frontiers Records, and SG Records.

== Solo discography ==
- Viewpoint (1999)
- Daily Trauma (2004, Frontiers Records)
- Eleven Mysteries (2012, Lion Music)
- Fantasia (2014, SG Records)
- An Innocent Challenge (2016, Lion Music)
- Worlds Apart (2019)
- Incomplete (2021)
