= Schemer-Dreamer =

Studio album by Steve Walsh
- Released: January 26, 1980
- Studio: Axis Sound Studios and Apogee Studios, Atlanta, Capricorn Studio, Macon, Georgia
- Genre: Arena rock
- Length: 37:33
- Label: Kirshner/CBS, Epic
- Producer: Steve Walsh, Brad Aaron, Davey Moiré

Steve Walsh chronology
Schemer-Dreamer (1980)	Glossolalia (2000)

Singles from Schemer-Dreamer
- 1. "Schemer-Dreamer/That's All Right" / "Just How It Feels" Released: 1980; 2. "Every Step of the Way" / "You Think You Got It Made" Released: 1980

Schemer-Dreamer is the first solo album by Steve Walsh, the original keyboardist/vocalist of the progressive rock band Kansas. It was released in 1980. Although this is his solo album, it features other members of Kansas including Kerry Livgren, Phil Ehart, and Rich Williams, as well as future Kansas member Steve Morse.

== Reception ==
Professional ratings
Review scores
Source	Rating
AllMusic	3/5 stars
Record Mirror	3.5/5 stars

In their retrospective review, AllMusic sarcastically suggested that the self-aggrandizing front cover of Schemer-Dreamer "very well could be the greatest album cover in rock history." They criticized the music itself as "a big, loud, dumb arena rock record, one that sounds completely tied to its year, if not month, of release", but also avouched that "it's kind of fun because of that".

== Track listing ==
All tracks are written by Steve Walsh, except where noted.

Side one
No.	Title	Length
1.	"Schemer-Dreamer/That's All Right" (S. Walsh / Arthur "Big Boy" Crudup)	5:22
2.	"Get Too Far"	4:26
3.	"So Many Nights"	4:19
4.	"You Think You Got It Made" (S. Walsh, Marie Walsh)	4:16

Side two
No.	Title	Length
5.	"Every Step of the Way"	8:30
6.	"Just How It Feels"	3:39
7.	"Wait Until Tomorrow"	6:01

== Personnel ==
Musicians

- Steve Walsh - keyboards, lead vocals, vibes, drums (track 3)
- Jeff Lux - electric guitar, acoustic guitar, vibraphone, flute, background vocals
- David Bryson - electric guitar (track 2)
- Kerry Livgren - guest electric guitar (track 4)
- Rich Williams - guest electric and acoustic guitars (track 1)
- Steve Morse - guest electric guitar (track 7)
- Merle McLain - bass (tracks 1, 2, 3, 7)
- Duane Buckler - bass guitar (track 4, 5)
- Turner Gaugh - bass (track 6)
- Tim Gehrt - drums (tracks 1, 2, 4, 5, 6)
- Phil Ehart - guest drums (track 7)
- Vic Hancock - handclaps
- Allen Sloan - violin, viola (track 6)
- Skip Lane - saxophone (track 7)
- Cecil Welch - trumpet (track 7)

Production

- Brad Aaron, Davey Moiré - co-producers, engineers
- David Pinkston, Les Horn - assistant engineers
- George Marino - mastering at Sterling Sound, New York
- Tom Drennon - art direction and design
- Will Weston III - cover illustration
- Marie Walsh, Chuck Sillery - photography
